= John E. Olcott House =

Historic house in Massachusetts, United States

- U.S. National Register of Historic Places
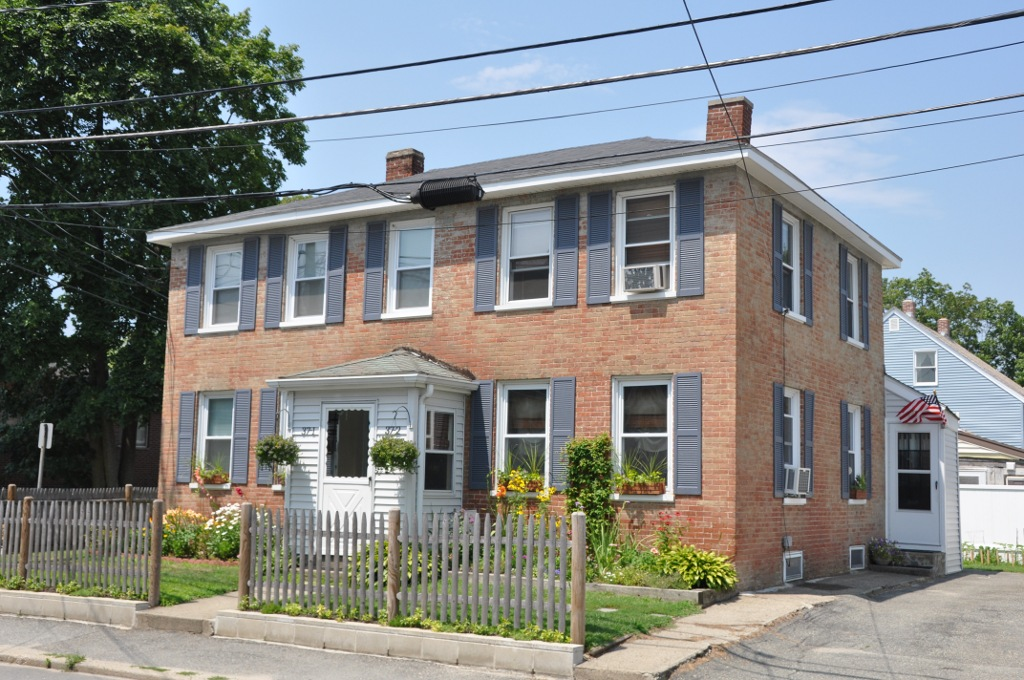

- Location within Massachusetts Location within the United States
- Location: 35–37 Central St., Waltham, Massachusetts
- Coordinates: 42°22′32.3″N 71°13′49.9″W
- Built: 1837
- Architectural style: Federal
- MPS: Waltham MRA
- NRHP reference No.: 89001492
- Added to NRHP: September 28, 1989

The John E. Olcott House is a historic house at 35–37 Central Street in Waltham, Massachusetts. Built c. 1837, the two story house is a rare local example of Federal style executed in brick. The house was built and occupied by John Olcott, a bricklayer, and is essentially vernacular in its styling, lacking some of the flourishes found in the more elaborate Elijah Fiske House. It is five bays wide, with a shallow-pitch hip roof, twin chimneys, and a projecting enclosed entry vestibule.

The house was listed on the National Register of Historic Places in 1989.

== See also ==
- National Register of Historic Places listings in Waltham, Massachusetts
