= Stanley House =

Stanley House may refer to:

Canada

- Camp Ekon, formerly known as Stanley House, in Ontario, Canada.

Denmark

- Stanley House, Copenhagen

Hong Kong

- Stanley House a.k.a. Maryknoll House (Stanley)

United Kingdom

- Stanley House, Castletown, Isle of Man, one of Isle of Man's Registered Buildings
- Stanley House, Chelsea, London
- Stanley House Hotel, Mellor, Lancashire

United States

- Stanley-Whitman House, Farmington, Connecticut, listed on the National Register of Historic Places (NRHP)
- Stanley-Woodruff-Allen House, West Hartford, Connecticut, NRHP-listed
- Leonard W. Stanley House, Waltham, Massachusetts, NRHP-listed
- Stanley House (Lima, New York), NRHP-listed in Livingston County, New York
