= Frank Tyler =

Frank Tyler may refer to:

- Frank J. Tyler House, Waltham, Massachusetts
- Frank M. Tyler, American architect
- Frank Tyler, character in The $5,000,000 Counterfeiting Plot

== See also ==
- Francis Tyler (1904–1956), American bobsledder
