= Newell D. Johnson House =

Historic house in Massachusetts, United States

- U.S. National Register of Historic Places
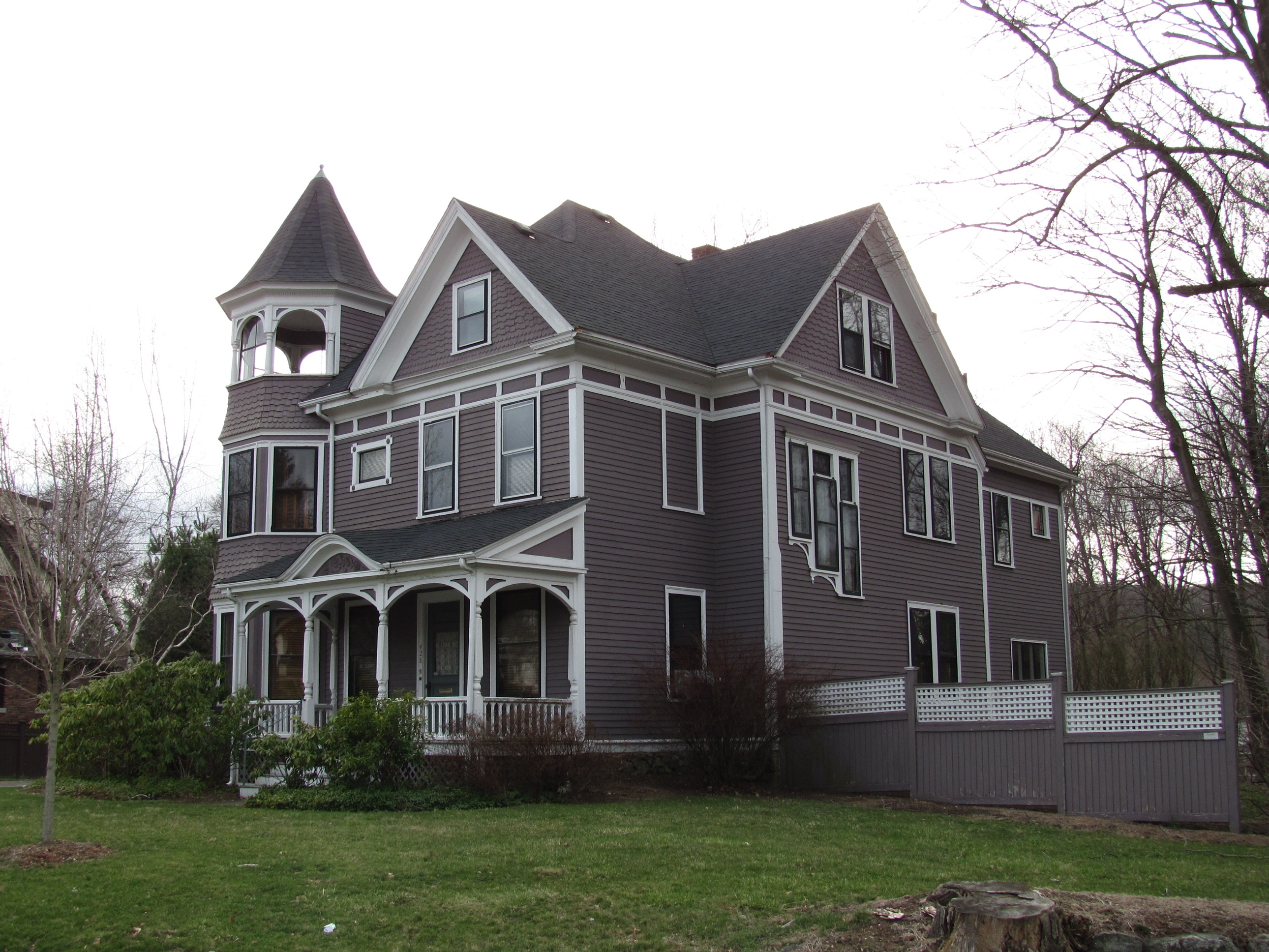
- Newell D. Johnson House

- Location within Massachusetts Location within the United States
- Location: 428 Lexington St., Waltham, Massachusetts
- Coordinates: 42°23′27″N 71°14′23″W
- Built: 1894
- Architectural style: Queen Anne
- MPS: Waltham MRA
- NRHP reference No.: 89001564
- Added to NRHP: September 28, 1989

The Newell D. Johnson House is a historic house at 428 Lexington Street in Waltham, Massachusetts. The 2 1/2-story wood-frame house was built in 1894, and is one of the most elaborate Queen Anne houses in the city's Piety Corner neighborhood. It has an octagonal tower at one corner with a pyramidal roof, bands of decorative cut wood shingling, and fluted porch posts. Newell Johnson, a dentist, had thi house built on the site of the Sanderson House, one of the first to be built in the area.

The house was listed on the National Register of Historic Places in 1989.

== See also ==
- National Register of Historic Places listings in Waltham, Massachusetts
