= Brigham House =

Historic house in Massachusetts, United States

- U.S. National Register of Historic Places
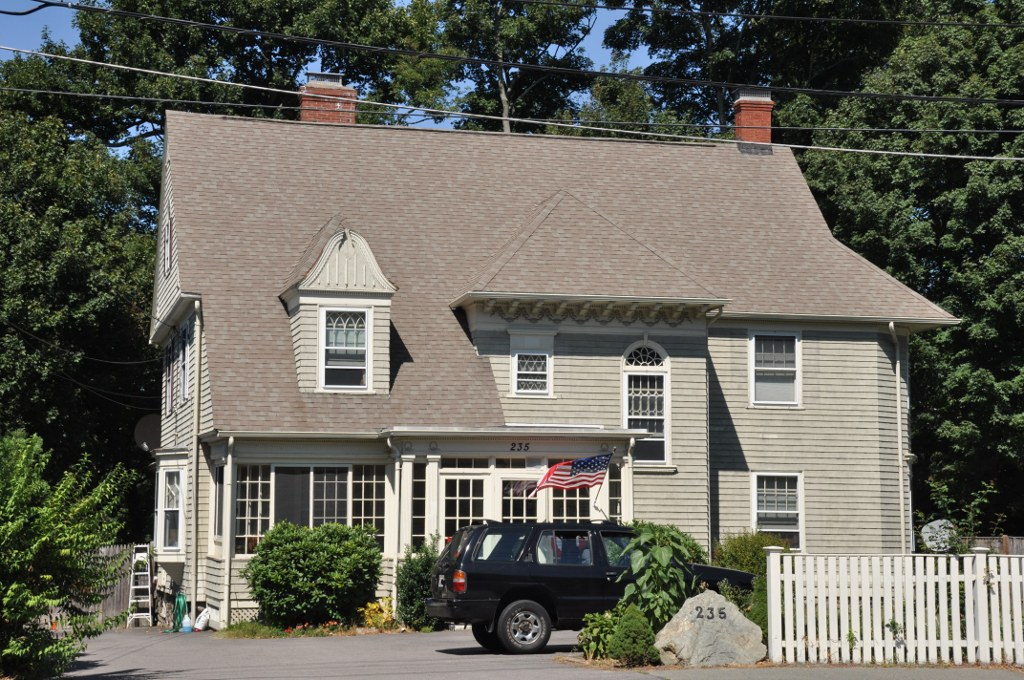

- Location within Massachusetts Location within the United States
- Location: 235 Main St., Waltham, Massachusetts
- Coordinates: 42°22′30″N 71°13′6″W
- Area: less than one acre
- Built: 1893
- Architectural style: Colonial Revival; Queen Anne; Shingle Style
- MPS: Waltham MRA
- NRHP reference No.: 89001551
- Added to NRHP: September 28, 1989

The Brigham House is a historic house at 235 Main Street in Waltham, Massachusetts. Built about 1893, it is an architecturally distinctive hybrid of Queen Anne, Shingle, and Colonial Revival styling. It was listed on the National Register of Historic Places in 1989.

== Description and history ==
The Brigham House stands in eastern Waltham, on the north side of busy Main Street (United States Route 20), at that point mainly residential in character. It is set just opposite Gilbert Road, facing south on a small lot. It is a 2 1/2-story wood-frame structure, with a gabled roof and clapboarded exterior. It has the asymmetrical appearance and irregular roof lines typical of Queen Anne styling, but the elements assembled in that manner are predominantly Colonial Revival and Shingle. A central projecting section with a hip roof has an extended eave with modillions, and windows with diamond lights. The left side of the main facade has a roof line that descends to the first floor, with a bell-shaped gable dormer. A Colonial Revival entry porch projects from a left-of-center position; it is enclosed in paned glass, but has square corner pillars.

The land on which the house stands was in the early 19th century part of the Bright family estate. The family began seriously subdividing the estate for residential development in the early 1890s, and the lot for this house was sold in 1892. Ella and Elijah Brigham were the buyers; he was an insurance agent working in Boston. This was one of the last houses to be built on this stretch of Main Street before a post-World War I building boom.

== See also ==
- National Register of Historic Places listings in Waltham, Massachusetts
