= Benjamin Wellington House =

Historic house in Massachusetts, United States

- U.S. National Register of Historic Places
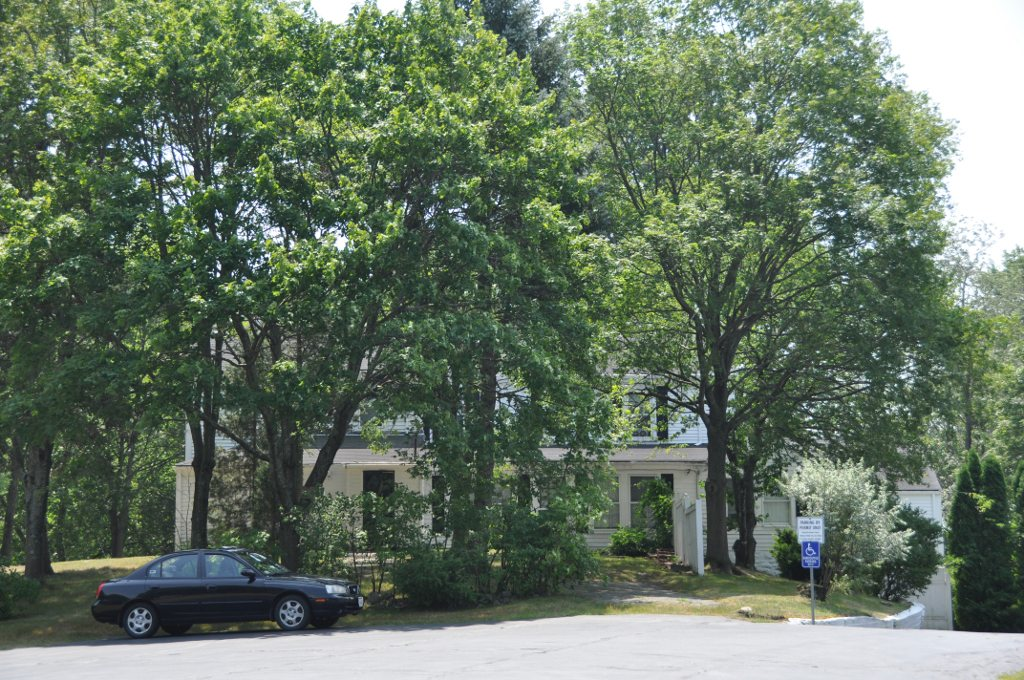
- View of the back of the house, which faces Whittier Ave

- Location within Massachusetts
- Location: 56 Whittier Street, Waltham, Massachusetts
- Coordinates: 42°24′48″N 71°14′31″W
- Built: 1810
- Architectural style: Federal
- MPS: Waltham MRA
- NRHP reference No.: 89001523
- Added to NRHP: September 28, 1989

The Benjamin Wellington House is a historic house in Waltham, Massachusetts. The 2 1/2-story wood-frame house was built c. 1810 by Benjamin Wellington, and is one of the city's few Federal style house with brick end-walls. The house is a well-proportioned five bays wide and three deep, with paired chimneys on each of the gable ends. A single-story porch with Tuscan columns wraps around two sides of the house. The Wellingtons, early settlers of the area, only acquired this farmstead (with surrounding farmlands) by marriage in the early 19th century.

The house was listed on the National Register of Historic Places in 1989.

== See also ==
- National Register of Historic Places listings in Waltham, Massachusetts
