= Potter–O'Brian House =

Historic house in Massachusetts, United States

- U.S. National Register of Historic Places
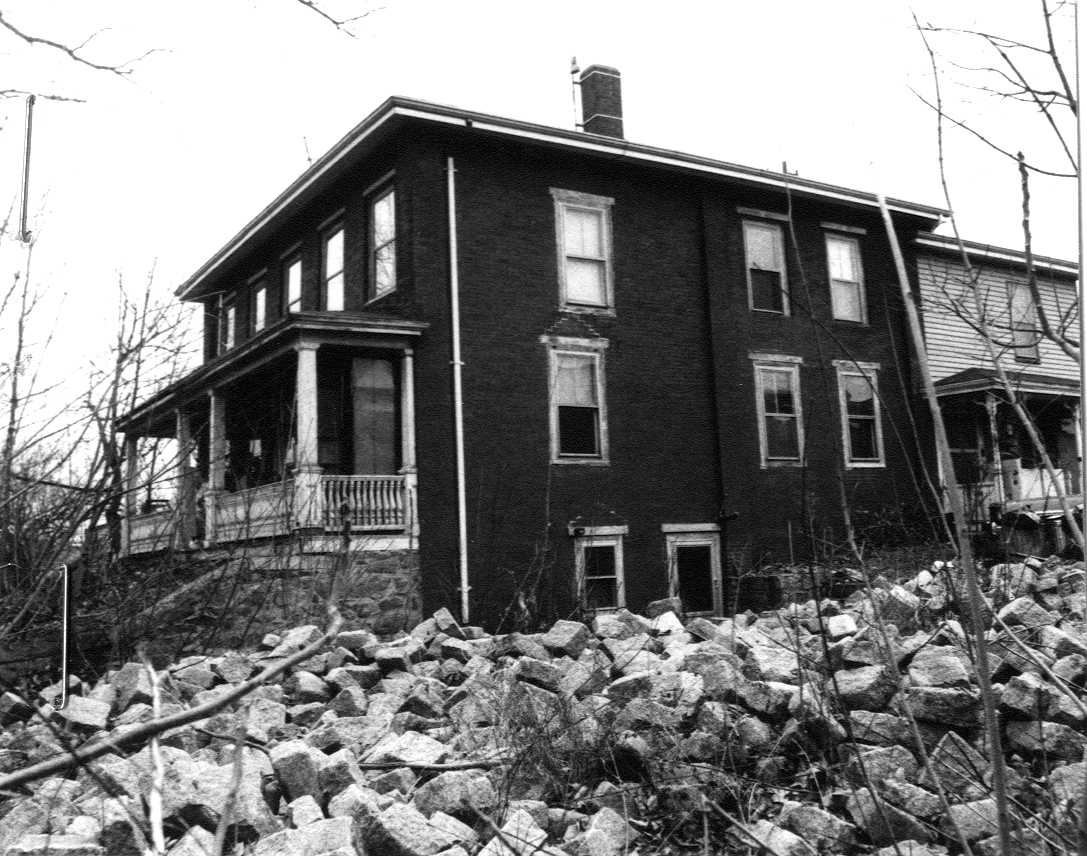
- c. 1984 photo

- Location within Massachusetts Location within the United States
- Location: 206 Newton St., Waltham, Massachusetts
- Coordinates: 42°22′12″N 71°13′48″W
- Built: 1850
- Architectural style: Italianate
- MPS: Waltham MRA
- NRHP reference No.: 89001538
- Added to NRHP: September 28, 1989

The Potter–O'Brian House was a historic house at 206 Newton Street in Waltham, Massachusetts. The 2 1/2-story brick house was built c. 1850, and was the city's only brick Italianate house. One of the older houses on the city's South Side, it was built when the area was still part of Newton. At the time Waltham purchased the territory from Newton, Edward Potter owned the house. It was owned by the O'Brian family for many years.

The house was listed on the National Register of Historic Places in 1989. It has since been demolished, but continues to be listed on the National Register.

== See also ==
- National Register of Historic Places listings in Waltham, Massachusetts
