= Dunbar–Stearns House =

Historic house in Massachusetts, United States

- U.S. National Register of Historic Places
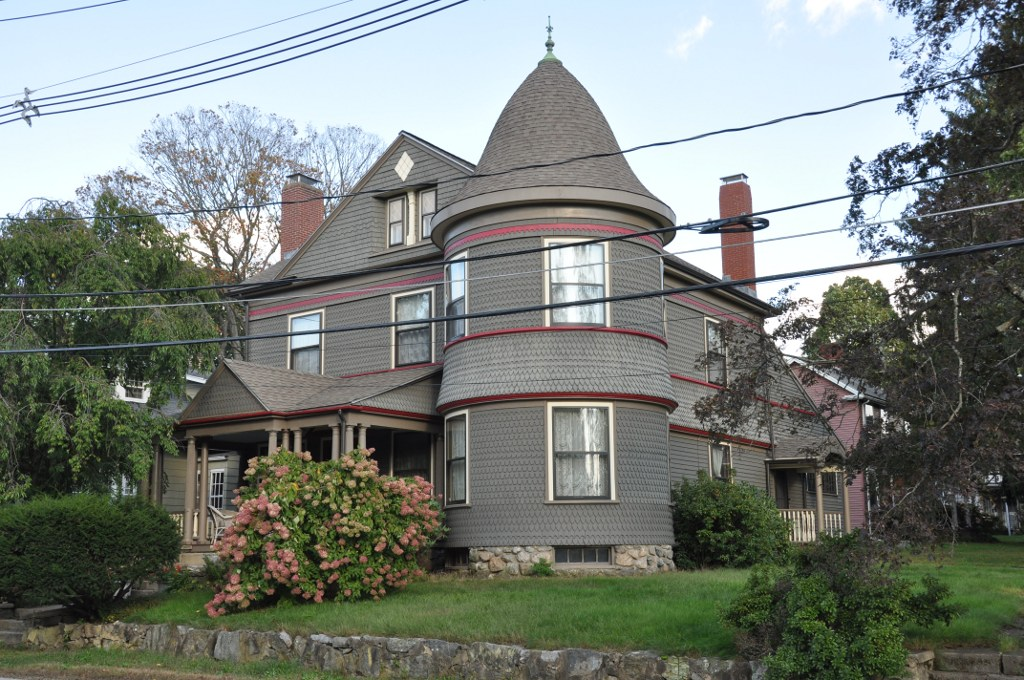

- Location within Massachusetts Location within the United States
- Location: 209 Linden St., Waltham, Massachusetts
- Coordinates: 42°22′54″N 71°13′6″W
- Built: c. 1846; 1892
- Architectural style: Greek Revival, Queen Anne
- MPS: Waltham MRA
- NRHP reference No.: 89001517
- Added to NRHP: March 09, 1990

The Dunbar–Stearns House is a historic house at 209 Linden Street in Waltham, Massachusetts. This 2 1/2-story wood-frame house was built c. 1846 by Peter Dunbar, and was originally Greek Revival in character. It had a fully pedimented gable, with a single-story porch that was supported by columns that apparently wrapped around the building. The house was purchased in 1892 by Joseph Stearns, who had the house completely remodeled to achieve its present Queen Anne styling. It was enlarged to the sides by incorporating the area of the side porticos, a turret was added to the front, and the pedimented gable was covered with decorative shingle styling. Interior alterations into the new style were equally extensive.

The house was listed on the National Register of Historic Places in 1990.

== See also ==
- National Register of Historic Places listings in Waltham, Massachusetts
