= Wellington–Castner House =

Historic house in Massachusetts, United States

- U.S. National Register of Historic Places
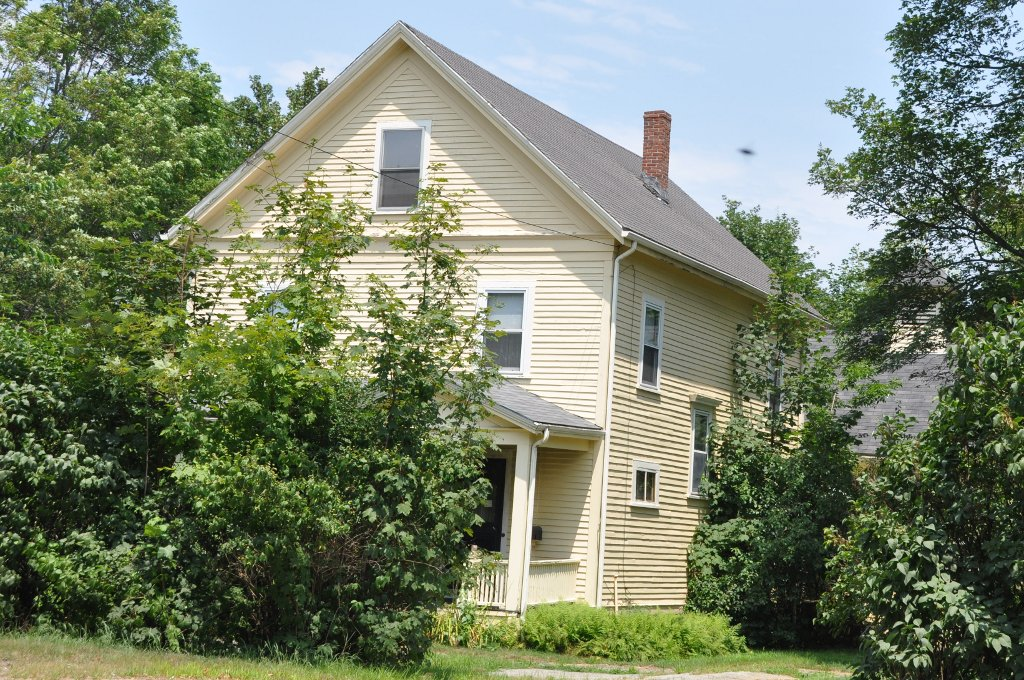

- Location within Massachusetts Location within the United States
- Location: 685 Trapelo Rd., Waltham, Massachusetts
- Coordinates: 42°24′22″N 71°13′11″W
- Built: 1902
- Architectural style: Queen Anne
- MPS: Waltham MRA
- NRHP reference No.: 89001511
- Added to NRHP: September 28, 1989

The Wellington–Castner House is a historic house in Waltham, Massachusetts. The house was listed on the National Register of Historic Places in 1989.

== History ==
One of the last houses built on Trapelo Road before the advent of suburban subdivision of the area, it was built for Charles Lowell Wellington in 1902, whose family owned land in the area from the 17th century.

== Architecture ==
The 2 1/2-story wood-frame house has simple, vernacular, Queen Anne styling; The house is three bays wide, with a front-facing pedimented gable, and a single-story hip-roofed porch with gable over the stairs, supported by square posts.

== See also ==
- National Register of Historic Places listings in Waltham, Massachusetts
