= National Register of Historic Places listings in Waltham, Massachusetts =

This is a list of properties and historic districts in Waltham, Massachusetts, that are listed on the National Register of Historic Places.

The locations of National Register properties and districts (at least for all showing latitude and longitude coordinates below) may be seen in an online map by clicking on "Map of all coordinates".

This National Park Service list is complete through NPS recent listings posted August 21, 2026.

== Current listings ==
	Name on the Register	Image	Date listed	Location	City or town	Description
1	American Waltham Watch Company Historic District	American Waltham Watch Company Historic District	September 28, 1989 (#89001501)	185–241 Crescent St. 42°22′01″N 71°14′39″W		
2	American Watch Tool Company	American Watch Tool Company	September 28, 1989 (#89001574)	169 Elm St. 42°22′18″N 71°13′56″W		
3	Joseph Andrews House	Joseph Andrews House	September 28, 1989 (#89001554)	258 Linden St. 42°23′00″N 71°13′04″W		
4	Charles Baker House	Charles Baker House	September 28, 1989 (#89001484)	107 Adams St. 42°22′02″N 71°14′28″W		
5	Charles Baker Property	Charles Baker Property	September 28, 1989 (#89001485)	119–121 Adams St. 42°22′00″N 71°14′29″W		
6	E. Sybbill Banks House	E. Sybbill Banks House	September 28, 1989 (#89001488)	27 Appleton St. 42°22′33″N 71°13′57″W		
7	Josiah Beard House	Josiah Beard House	September 28, 1989 (#89001529)	70 School St. 42°22′40″N 71°14′03″W		
8	Beth Eden Baptist Church	Beth Eden Baptist Church	September 28, 1989 (#89001544)	82 Maple St. 42°22′04″N 71°14′20″W		
9	Boston Manufacturing Company	Boston Manufacturing Company	December 22, 1977 (#77001412)	144 Moody St. 42°22′23″N 71°14′09″W		
10	Boston Manufacturing Company Housing	Boston Manufacturing Company Housing	September 28, 1989 (#89001534)	380–410 River St. 42°22′25″N 71°13′55″W		
11	Boston Manufacturing Company Housing	Boston Manufacturing Company Housing	September 28, 1989 (#89001535)	153–165 River St. 42°22′13″N 71°13′20″W		
12	Brigham House	Brigham House	September 28, 1989 (#89001551)	235 Main St. 42°22′37″N 71°13′05″W		
13	Building at 202–204 Charles Street	Building at 202–204 Charles Street	September 28, 1989 (#89001493)	202–204 Charles St. 42°22′24″N 71°14′45″W		
14	Francis Buttrick House	Francis Buttrick House	September 28, 1989 (#89001566)	44 Harvard St. 42°22′28″N 71°14′38″W		
15	Francis Buttrick Library	Francis Buttrick Library	September 28, 1989 (#89001547)	741 Main St. 42°22′35″N 71°14′23″W		
16	Charles Byam House	Charles Byam House	September 28, 1989 (#89001576)	337 Crescent St. 42°21′46″N 71°14′35″W		
17	The Castle	The Castle	April 9, 1979 (#79000359)	415 South St. 42°22′01″N 71°15′22″W		This is on the campus of Brandeis University.
18	Central Square Historic District	Central Square Historic District	September 28, 1989 (#89001526)	Roughly bounded by Church, Carter, Moody, Main and Lexington Sts. 42°22′32″N 71°14′10″W		
19	Charles River Reservation Parkways	Charles River Reservation Parkways	January 18, 2006 (#05001530)	Soldiers Field, Nonantum, Leo Birmingham, Arsenal, Greenough, N. Beacon, Charles River, Norumbega, Recreation; 42°21′42″N 71°09′31″W		Extends into Cambridge and Newton, Watertown and Weston, elsewhere in Middlesex County, and into Boston in Suffolk County
20	Charles Street Workers' Housing Historic District	Charles Street Workers' Housing Historic District	September 28, 1989 (#89001503)	128–144 Charles St. 42°22′25″N 71°14′37″W		
21	Christ Episcopal Church	Christ Episcopal Church	September 28, 1989 (#89001546)	750 Main St. 42°22′32″N 71°14′27″W		
22	Benjamin F. Clough House	Benjamin F. Clough House	September 28, 1989 (#89001536)	42–44 Prospect St. 42°22′21″N 71°14′49″W		
23	Gilbert Colburn House	Gilbert Colburn House	September 28, 1989 (#89001578)	110–112 Crescent St. 42°22′11″N 71°14′29″W		
24	Company F State Armory	Company F State Armory	September 28, 1989 (#89001571)	Curtis and Sharon Sts. 42°22′10″N 71°14′53″W		
25	Lenoir Dow House	Lenoir Dow House	September 28, 1989 (#89001487)	215 Adams St. 42°21′48″N 71°14′33″W		
26	Dunbar–Stearns House	Dunbar–Stearns House	March 9, 1990 (#89001517)	209 Linden St. 42°22′54″N 71°13′06″W		
27	East Main Street Historic District	East Main Street Historic District	September 28, 1989 (#89001498)	Roughly E. Main St. from Townsend St. to Chamberlain Ter. 42°22′37″N 71°13′39″W		
28	Eastern Middlesex County Second District Court	Eastern Middlesex County Second District Court	September 28, 1989 (#89001516)	38 Linden St. 42°22′40″N 71°13′30″W		
29	Walter E. Fernald State School	Walter E. Fernald State School	January 21, 1994 (#93001487)	200 Trapelo Rd. 42°23′28″N 71°12′38″W		
30	First Congregational Church	First Congregational Church	September 28, 1989 (#89001548)	730 Main St. 42°22′32″N 71°14′24″W		
31	First Parish Church	First Parish Church	September 28, 1989 (#89001507)	87 School St. 42°22′42″N 71°14′07″W		
32	Henry N. Fisher House	Henry N. Fisher House	September 28, 1989 (#89001577)	120 Crescent St. 42°22′09″N 71°14′30″W		
33	Elijah Fiske House	Elijah Fiske House	September 28, 1989 (#89001514)	457 Lincoln St. 42°24′10″N 71°14′55″W		
34	Frederick Flagg House	Frederick Flagg House	September 28, 1989 (#89001573)	65 Fairmont Ave. 42°22′19″N 71°15′25″W		
35	Daniel French School	Daniel French School	September 28, 1989 (#89001581)	38–40 Common St. 42°22′39″N 71°14′15″W		Now a residential duplex.
36	Fuller–Bemis House	Fuller–Bemis House	March 9, 1990 (#89001495)	41–43 Cherry St. 42°22′01″N 71°14′29″W		
37	Gale–Banks House	Gale–Banks House	March 9, 1990 (#89001545)	935 Main St. 42°22′33″N 71°14′58″W		
38	William Gibbs House	William Gibbs House	September 28, 1989 (#89001561)	14 Liberty St. 42°22′37″N 71°14′01″W		
39	Gilbrae Inn	Gilbrae Inn	September 28, 1989 (#89001550)	403 River St. 42°22′26″N 71°13′58″W		
40	Gore Place	Gore Place	December 30, 1970 (#70000542)	52 Gore St. 42°22′20″N 71°12′41″W		
41	Grove Hill Cemetery	Grove Hill Cemetery	September 28, 1989 (#89001549)	290 Main St. 42°22′34″N 71°13′17″W		
42	Hagar–Smith–Livermore–Sanderson House	Hagar–Smith–Livermore–Sanderson House	September 28, 1989 (#89001532)	51 Sanders Ln. 42°23′19″N 71°14′43″W		
43	Hager–Mead House	Hager–Mead House	September 28, 1989 (#89001572)	411 Main St. 42°22′40″N 71°13′38″W		
44	Henry C. Hall House	Henry C. Hall House	September 28, 1989 (#89001579)	107 Crescent St. 42°22′11″N 71°14′30″W		
45	Ephraim Hammond House	Ephraim Hammond House	September 28, 1989 (#89001490)	265 Beaver St. 42°23′10″N 71°12′51″W		
46	Jonathan Hammond House	Jonathan Hammond House	September 28, 1989 (#89001491)	311 Beaver St. 42°23′06″N 71°13′00″W		
47	Nahum Hardy House	Nahum Hardy House	September 28, 1989 (#89001562)	724 Lexington St. 42°23′59″N 71°14′05″W		
48	Harrington Block	Harrington Block	September 28, 1989 (#89001543)	376–390 Moody St. 42°22′10″N 71°14′15″W		
49	Samuel Harrington House	Samuel Harrington House	September 28, 1989 (#89001508)	Old South St. 42°21′47″N 71°15′35″W		
50	Rev. Thomas Hill House	Rev. Thomas Hill House	September 28, 1989 (#89001528)	132 Church St. 42°22′49″N 71°13′57″W		
51	Hobbs Brook Basin Gate House	Hobbs Brook Basin Gate House	September 28, 1989 (#89001524)	Off Winter St. at the mouth of Hobbs Brook; 42°23′55″N 71°16′25″W		
52	Richard Holbrook Houses	Richard Holbrook Houses	September 28, 1989 (#89001565)	29–31 Heard St. 42°22′34″N 71°13′51″W		
53	Edwin C. Johnson House	Edwin C. Johnson House	September 28, 1989 (#89001522)	177 Weston St./8 Caldwell St. 42°22′27″N 71°15′26″W		
54	Newell D. Johnson House	Newell D. Johnson House	September 28, 1989 (#89001564)	428 Lexington St. 42°23′27″N 71°14′23″W		
55	Phineas Lawrence House	Phineas Lawrence House	August 20, 1987 (#87001397)	257 Trapelo Rd. 42°23′43″N 71°12′25″W		
56	Lawton Place Historic District	Lawton Place Historic District	September 28, 1989 (#89001504)	Lawton Pl. between Amory Rd. and Jackson St. 42°22′29″N 71°13′51″W		
57	Nelson F. Libby House	Nelson F. Libby House	September 28, 1989 (#89001521)	147–149 Weston St. 42°22′25″N 71°15′18″W		
58	Linden Street Bridge	Linden Street Bridge	September 28, 1989 (#89001515)	Boston & Maine railroad line over Linden St. 42°22′48″N 71°13′15″W		
59	Lord's Castle	Lord's Castle	September 28, 1989 (#89001567)	211 Hammond St. 42°23′01″N 71°14′50″W		
60	Lyman Street Historic District	Lyman Street Historic District	September 28, 1989 (#89001505)	Roughly Lyman St. from Church to Main Sts. 42°22′44″N 71°13′53″W		
61	Aaron Martin House	Aaron Martin House	September 28, 1989 (#89001540)	786 Moody St. 42°21′45″N 71°14′20″W		
62	Aaron Martin Houses	Aaron Martin Houses	September 28, 1989 (#89001486)	188–194 Adams St. 42°21′51″N 71°14′30″W		
63	Metropolitan State Hospital	Metropolitan State Hospital	January 21, 1994 (#93001482)	475 Trapelo Rd. 42°24′14″N 71°12′40″W		Extends into Lexington and Belmont
64	Moody Street Fire Station	Moody Street Fire Station	September 28, 1989 (#89001541)	533 Moody St. 42°22′02″N 71°14′18″W		
65	Moody Street Historic District	Moody Street Historic District	March 9, 1990 (#89001502)	Moody and Crescent Sts. 42°22′18″N 71°14′16″W		
66	Mount Feake Cemetery	Mount Feake Cemetery	September 28, 1989 (#89001497)	203 Prospect St. 42°21′52″N 71°14′58″W		
67	Mt. Prospect School for Boys	Mt. Prospect School for Boys	March 9, 1990 (#89001525)	90 Worcester Ln. 42°23′23″N 71°14′39″W		Demolished.
68	Robert Murray House	Robert Murray House	September 28, 1989 (#89001580)	85 Crescent St. 42°22′13″N 71°14′27″W		
69	Newton Street Bridge	Newton Street Bridge	September 28, 1989 (#89001539)	Newton St. at River St. over the Charles River; 42°22′20″N 71°13′45″W		
70	North Lexington Street Historic District	North Lexington Street Historic District	September 28, 1989 (#89001500)	508–536 N. Lexington St. 42°23′35″N 71°14′19″W		
71	O'Hara Waltham Dial Company	O'Hara Waltham Dial Company	September 28, 1989 (#89001533)	74 Rumford Ave. 42°22′06″N 71°14′38″W		
72	John E. Olcott House	John E. Olcott House	September 28, 1989 (#89001492)	35–37 Central St. 42°22′21″N 71°13′51″W		
73	The Oxford	The Oxford	September 28, 1989 (#89001483)	4 Adams St. 42°22′16″N 71°14′21″W		
74	Robert Treat Paine Jr. House	Robert Treat Paine Jr. House	October 7, 1975 (#75000291)	100 Robert Treat Paine Drive; 42°23′19″N 71°13′50″W		
75	John M. Peck House	John M. Peck House	September 28, 1989 (#89001559)	27 Liberty St. 42°22′40″N 71°14′00″W		
76	Piety Corner Historic District	Piety Corner Historic District	March 9, 1990 (#89001499)	Roughly Bacon and Lexington Sts. 42°23′20″N 71°14′19″W		
77	Potter–O'Brian House	Potter–O'Brian House	September 28, 1989 (#89001538)	206 Newton St. 42°22′12″N 71°13′48″W		Demolished.
78	Prospect House	Prospect House	September 28, 1989 (#89001568)	11 Hammond St. 42°22′36″N 71°14′46″W		
79	Royal E. Robbins School	Royal E. Robbins School	September 28, 1989 (#89001496)	58 Chestnut St. 42°22′08″N 71°14′21″W		
80	John Sanderson House	John Sanderson House	September 28, 1989 (#89001563)	564 Lexington St. 42°23′41″N 71°14′15″W		
81	Nathan Sanderson I House	Nathan Sanderson I House	September 28, 1989 (#89001556)	107 Lincoln St. 42°23′37″N 71°14′35″W		
82	Nathan Sanderson II House	Nathan Sanderson II House	September 28, 1989 (#89001513)	111 Lincoln St. 42°23′36″N 71°14′36″W		
83	Sanderson–Clark Farmhouse	Sanderson–Clark Farmhouse	September 28, 1989 (#89001557)	75 Lincoln St. 42°23′36″N 71°14′29″W		
84	Marshall Smith House	Marshall Smith House	September 28, 1989 (#89001560)	26 Liberty St. 42°22′40″N 71°14′01″W		
85	Perez Smith House	Perez Smith House	September 28, 1989 (#89001558)	46 Lincoln St. 42°23′31″N 71°14′27″W		
86	St. Charles Borromeo Church	St. Charles Borromeo Church	September 28, 1989 (#89001569)	Hall and Cushing Sts. 42°22′08″N 71°14′10″W		
87	St. Mary's Roman Catholic Church Complex	St. Mary's Roman Catholic Church Complex	September 28, 1989 (#89001527)	133 School St. 42°22′44″N 71°14′14″W		
88	Leonard W. Stanley House	Leonard W. Stanley House	September 28, 1989 (#89001509)	23–25 Taylor St. 42°22′11″N 71°14′12″W		
89	Stark Building	Stark Building	September 28, 1989 (#89001542)	416–424 Moody St. 42°22′08″N 71°14′15″W		
90	Robert M. Stark House	Robert M. Stark House	September 28, 1989 (#89001552)	176 Main St. 42°22′34″N 71°12′59″W		
91	Amos Stearns House	Amos Stearns House	September 28, 1989 (#89001518)	1081 Trapelo Rd. 42°24′42″N 71°14′12″W		
92	Henry Stewart House	Henry Stewart House	September 28, 1989 (#89001553)	294 Linden St. 42°23′05″N 71°13′02″W		
93	James Swasey House	James Swasey House	September 28, 1989 (#89001530)	30 Common St. 42°22′38″N 71°14′15″W		Probably demolished
94	Frank J. Tyler House	Frank J. Tyler House	September 28, 1989 (#89001555)	238 Linden St. 42°22′59″N 71°13′06″W		
95	United States Watch Company	United States Watch Company	September 28, 1989 (#89001494)	256 Charles St. 42°22′21″N 71°14′57″W		
96	US Post Office–Waltham Main	US Post Office–Waltham Main	May 30, 1986 (#86001248)	774 Main St. 42°22′33″N 71°14′31″W		
97	The Vale	The Vale	December 30, 1970 (#70000737)	Lyman and Beaver Sts. 42°23′01″N 71°13′44″W		
98	Waltham Gas and Electric Company Generating Plant	Waltham Gas and Electric Company Generating Plant	September 28, 1989 (#89001537)	96 Pine St. 42°22′15″N 71°14′00″W		
99	Waltham Gas Light Company	Waltham Gas Light Company	September 28, 1989 (#89001506)	2 Cooper St. 42°22′19″N 71°14′01″W		Demolished.
100	Waltham High School	Waltham High School	September 28, 1989 (#89001531)	55 School St. 42°22′44″N 71°14′03″W		
101	Waltham Water Works Shop	Waltham Water Works Shop	September 28, 1989 (#89001570)	92 Felton St. 42°22′24″N 71°14′28″W		
102	Nathan Warren House	Nathan Warren House	March 9, 1990 (#89001520)	50 Weston St. 42°22′27″N 71°15′12″W		Demolished.
103	Benjamin Wellington House	Benjamin Wellington House	September 28, 1989 (#89001523)	56 Whittier St. 42°24′48″N 71°14′31″W		
104	William Wellington House	William Wellington House	September 28, 1989 (#89001512)	785 Trapelo Rd. 42°24′24″N 71°13′13″W		
105	Wellington–Castner House	Wellington–Castner House	September 28, 1989 (#89001511)	685 Trapelo Rd. 42°24′22″N 71°13′11″W		
106	Wetherbee House	Wetherbee House	September 28, 1989 (#89001575)	357 Crescent St. 42°21′43″N 71°14′32″W		
107	Warren White House	Warren White House	September 28, 1989 (#89001519)	192 Warren St. 42°22′45″N 71°12′23″W		
108	Whitney–Farrington–Cook House	Whitney–Farrington–Cook House	September 28, 1989 (#89001510)	385 Trapelo Rd. 42°23′54″N 71°12′40″W		Demolished.
109	Wilson's Diner	Wilson's Diner	September 22, 1999 (#99001126)	507 Main St. 42°23′10″N 71°13′53″W		
