= Perez Smith House =

Historic house in Massachusetts, United States

- U.S. National Register of Historic Places
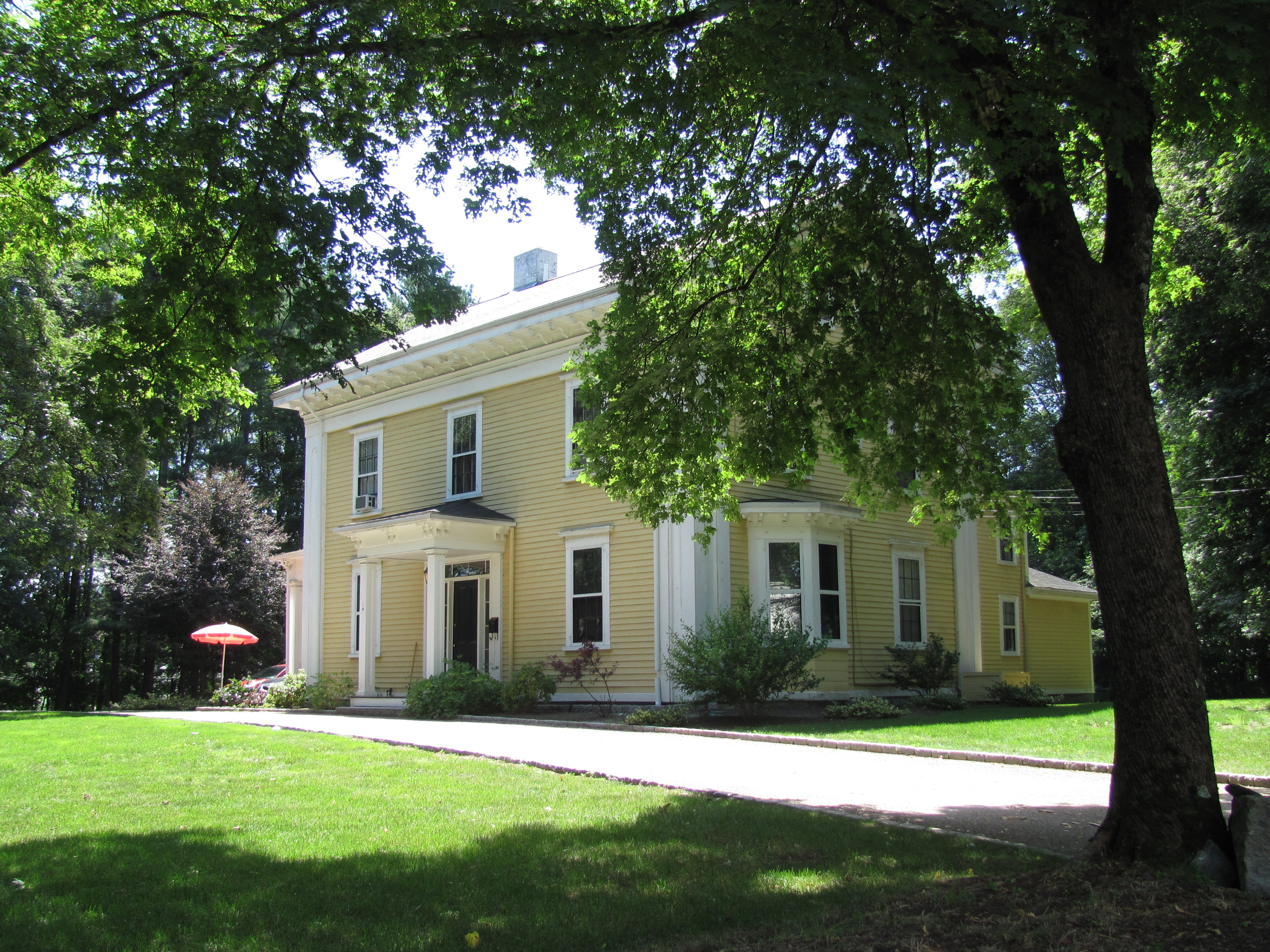
- Perez Smith House

- Location within Massachusetts Location within the United States
- Coordinates: 42°23′31″N 71°14′27″W
- Built: 1851
- Architectural style: Italianate
- MPS: Waltham MRA
- NRHP reference No.: 89001558
- Added to NRHP: September 28, 1989

The Perez Smith House was a historic house at 46 Lincoln Street in Waltham, Massachusetts. The 2½ story wood-frame house was built in 1851 and was one of the city's finest transitional Greek Revival/Italianate houses. It had a typical Italianate three-bay facade, deep cornice with decorative brackets, and round-arch windows in the gable. It also had Greek Revival pilastered cornerboards, and its center entry was flanked by sidelight windows and topped by a transom window and paneled sunburst. Its windows were topped by heavy corniced lintels.

The house was listed on the National Register of Historic Places in 1989. It was demolished in June 2024.

== See also ==
- National Register of Historic Places listings in Waltham, Massachusetts
