= Nathan Warren House =

Historic house in Massachusetts, United States

- U.S. National Register of Historic Places
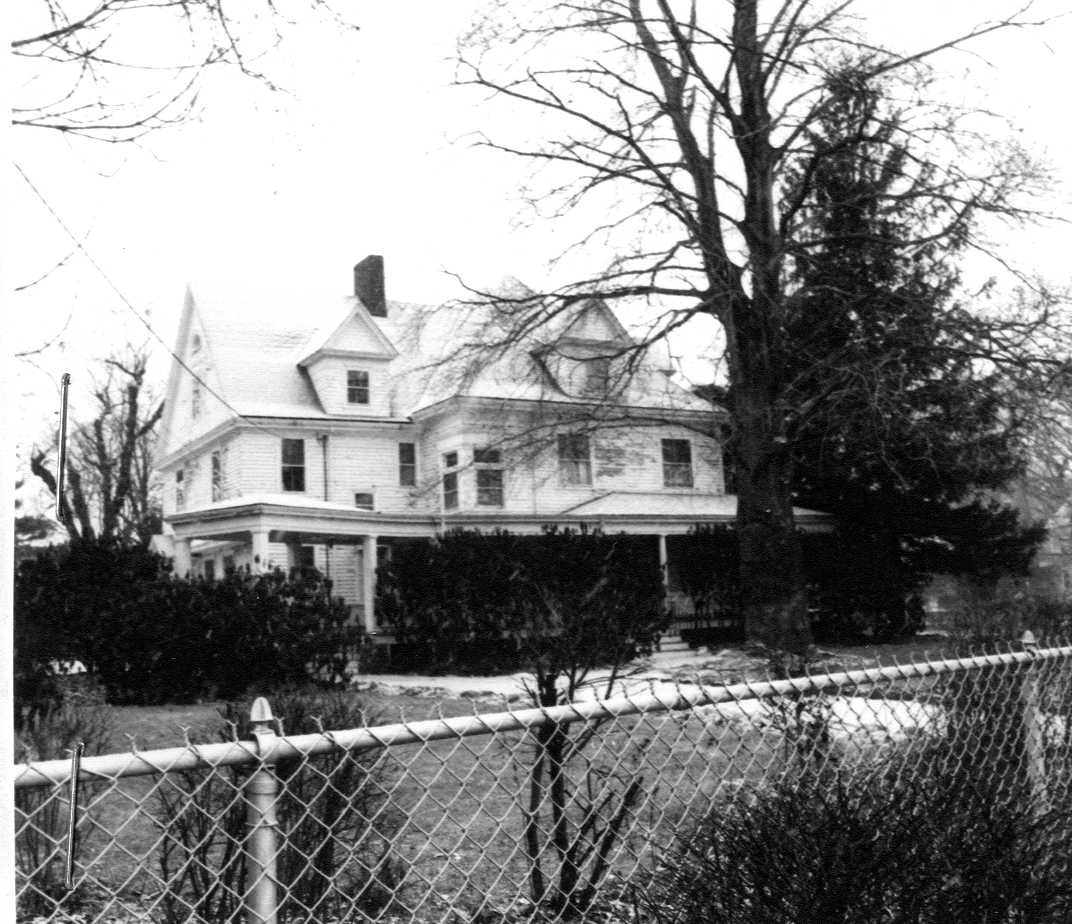
- c. 1984 photo

- Location within Massachusetts Location within the United States
- Location: 50 Weston St., Waltham, Massachusetts
- Coordinates: 42°22′27″N 71°15′12″W
- Built: 1889
- Architectural style: Queen Anne
- MPS: Waltham MRA
- NRHP reference No.: 89001520
- Added to NRHP: March 09, 1990

The Nathan Warren House was a historic house at 50 Weston Street in Waltham, Massachusetts. Built c. 1889-90 the 2 1/2-story house was one of the city's finest Queen Anne residences, with a turret and porte cochere, as well as a variety of decorated projecting sections. The house was built by Nathan Warren, who wrote a history of Waltham, was active in local and state politics, and who was a member of an exploratory expedition to the Yellowstone area in 1873.

The house was listed on the National Register of Historic Places in 1990. It was demolished in 2006.

== See also ==
- National Register of Historic Places listings in Waltham, Massachusetts
