= Gilbert Colburn House =

Historic house in Massachusetts, United States

- U.S. National Register of Historic Places
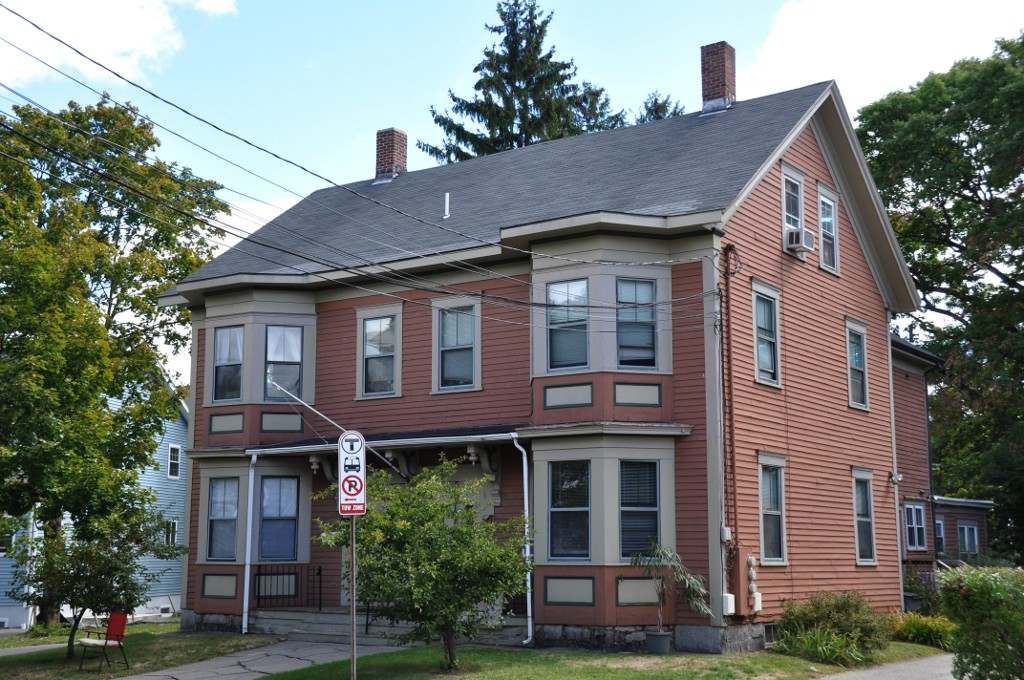

- Location within Massachusetts Location within the United States
- Location: 110–112 Crescent St., Waltham, Massachusetts
- Coordinates: 42°22′11.0″N 71°14′27.0″W
- Built: 1870
- Architectural style: Italianate
- MPS: Waltham MRA
- NRHP reference No.: 89001578
- Added to NRHP: September 28, 1989

The Gilbert Colburn House is a historic house at 110–112 Crescent Street in Waltham, Massachusetts. The two-story wood-frame duplex was built c. 1870, and is a nearly intact example of an Italianate house built for Waltham Watch Company workers. The main facade is symmetrical, with a pair of entrances at the center, each with its own ornate scrolled hood. They are flanked by a pair of two-story projecting polygonal bays with apron panels.

The house was listed on the National Register of Historic Places in 1989.

== See also ==
- National Register of Historic Places listings in Waltham, Massachusetts
