= Henry C. Hall House =

Historic house in Massachusetts, United States

- U.S. National Register of Historic Places
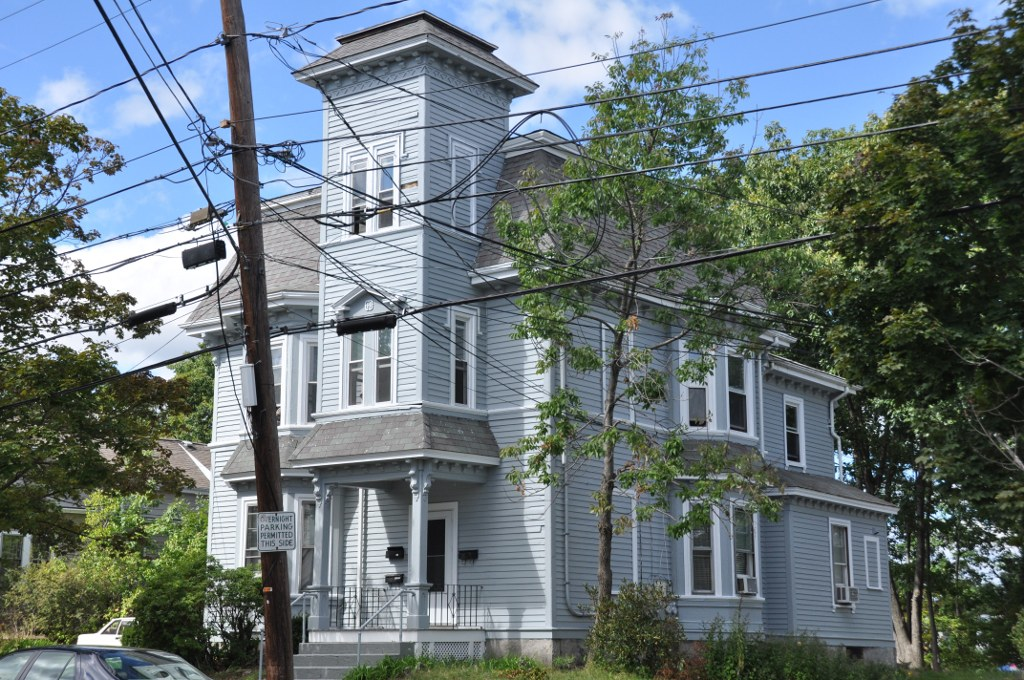

- Location within Massachusetts Location within the United States
- Location: 107 Crescent St., Waltham, Massachusetts
- Coordinates: 42°22′12.3″N 71°14′27.8″W
- Built: 1872
- Architectural style: Italianate
- MPS: Waltham MRA
- NRHP reference No.: 89001579
- Added to NRHP: September 28, 1989

The Henry C. Hall House is a historic house at 107 Crescent Street in Waltham, Massachusetts. This 2 1/2-story wood-frame house was built c. 1872–74 by Henry Hall, co-owner of a local pharmacy. The house has a mansard roof characteristic of the Second Empire style, with a 3 1/2-story tower topped by a truncated hip roof. The cornice of the tower and of the main house are both studded with brackets, as are the skirted roof lines above the building's projecting bays.

The house was listed on the National Register of Historic Places in 1989.

== See also ==
- National Register of Historic Places listings in Waltham, Massachusetts
