= Francis Buttrick House =

Historic house in Massachusetts, United States

- U.S. National Register of Historic Places
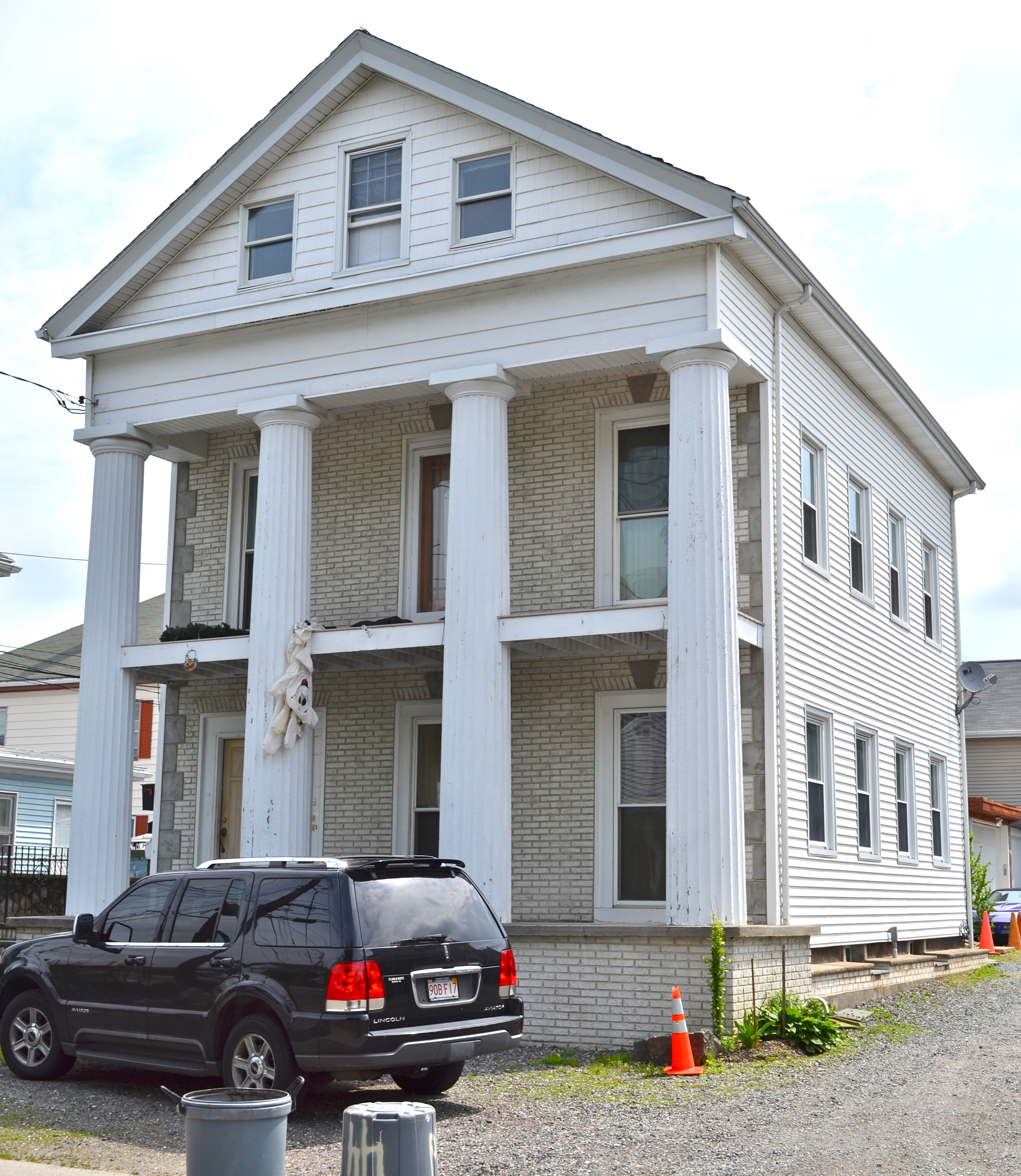

- Location within Massachusetts Location within the United States
- Location: 44 Harvard Street, Waltham, Massachusetts
- Coordinates: 42°22′28″N 71°14′37″W
- Area: less than one acre
- Built: 1850-1874
- Architectural style: Greek Revival
- MPS: Waltham MRA
- NRHP reference No.: 89001566
- Added to NRHP: September 28, 1989

The Francis Buttrick House is a historic house at 44 Harvard Street in Waltham, Massachusetts. Built before 1852, it is one of a small number of temple-front Greek Revival houses in the city. It was listed on the National Register of Historic Places in 1989.

== Description and history ==
The Francis Buttrick House stands in a densely built residential area west of downtown Waltham, on the east side of Harvard Street between Charles Street and Harvard Places. It is a 2 1/2-story wood-frame structure, with a gabled roof and exterior clad in a variety of finishes. Its principal distinguishing features is the massive two-story Greek Revival portico, with four fluted Doric Columns (one a modern replacement) supporting a full entablature and pedimented gable. The front facade has full-height windows, with the main entrance in the leftmost of three bays. A series of ells extend the building to the rear.

The house was built sometime before 1852; at the time of its listing on the National Register in 1989, it was one of four surviving temple-fronted houses in the city. It was originally located a short way to the south, facing Charles Street, and was moved to its present location in the 1860s by Francis Buttrick, who apparently used it as a rental property.

== See also ==
- National Register of Historic Places listings in Waltham, Massachusetts
