= Josiah Beard House =

Historic house in Massachusetts, United States

- U.S. National Register of Historic Places
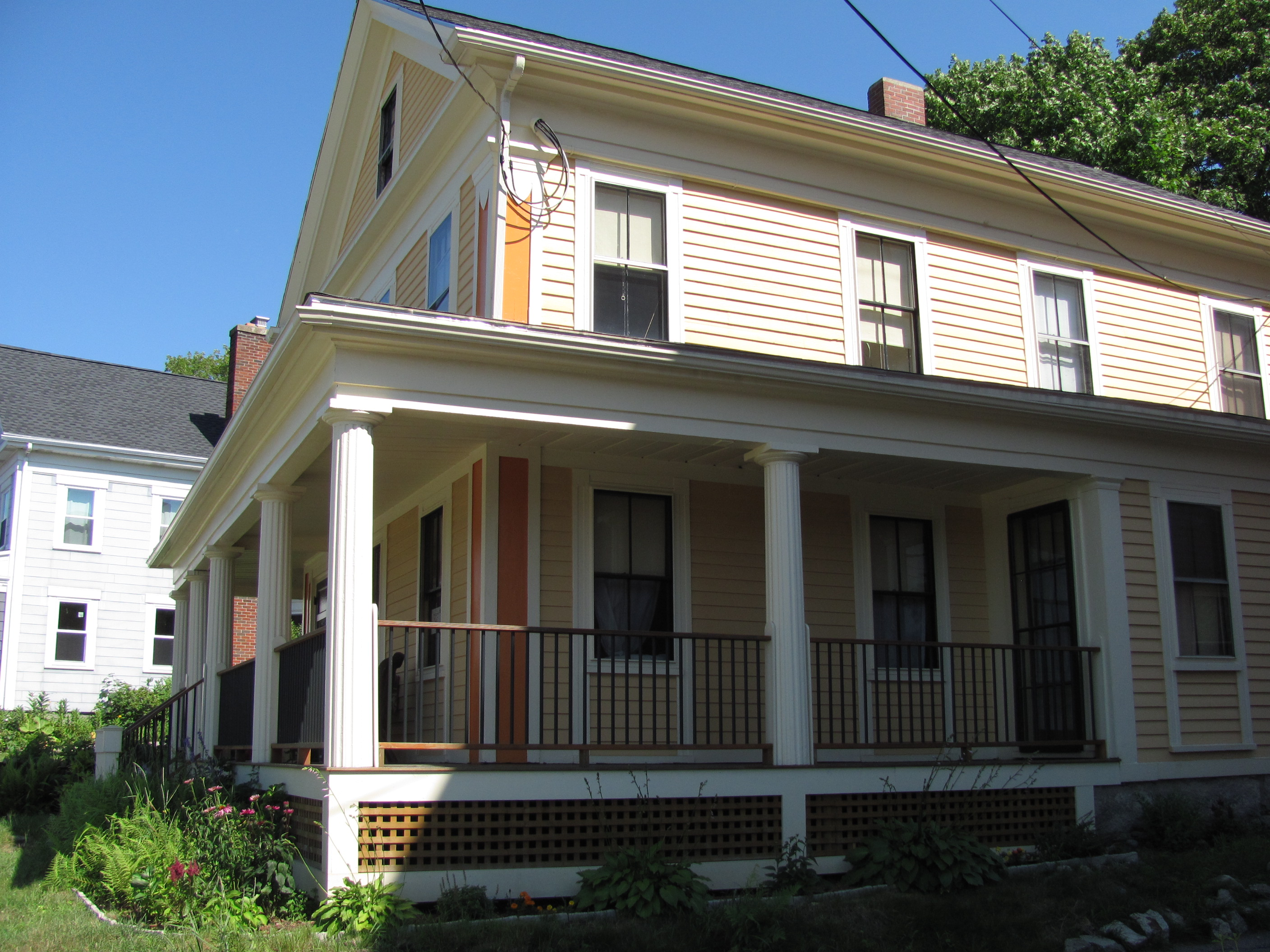
- Josiah Beard House

- Location within Massachusetts Location within the United States
- Location: 70 School St., Waltham, Massachusetts
- Coordinates: 42°22′40″N 71°14′3″W
- Area: less than one acre
- Built: 1844
- Architectural style: Greek Revival
- MPS: Waltham MRA
- NRHP reference No.: 89001529
- Added to NRHP: September 28, 1989

The Josiah Beard House is a historic house at 70 School Street in Waltham, Massachusetts. Built about 1844, it is a well-preserved local example of a side-hall Greek Revival house. It was listed on the National Register of Historic Places in 1989.

== Description and history ==
The Josiah Beard House stands near the center of Waltham, on the south side of School Street just east of its junction with Church Street. It is a 2 1/2-story wood-frame structure, with a gable roof and clapboarded exterior. It has paneled corner boards with a distinctive spade detail at the top, a full entablature, and a fully pedimented gable end. The main facade is three bays wide, with the entrance in the leftmost bay. Its single story porch is supported by fluted Doric columns, and runs across the front of the house and partway along the right side.

The 2 1/2-story wood-frame house was built in 1844, and is a well-preserved local example of Greek Revival styling. Joseph Beard, the probable builder, was prominent in local politics, and may have played a role in the invention of the bottle cap. He served as a town selectman, and as a representative in the state legislature. A later owner of the building moved it to its present location in 1888; it originally faced School Street on a large lot, and was moved within the lot to facilitate its subdivision.

== See also ==
- National Register of Historic Places listings in Waltham, Massachusetts
