= Moody Street Historic District =

Historic district in Massachusetts, United States

- U.S. National Register of Historic Places
- U.S. Historic district
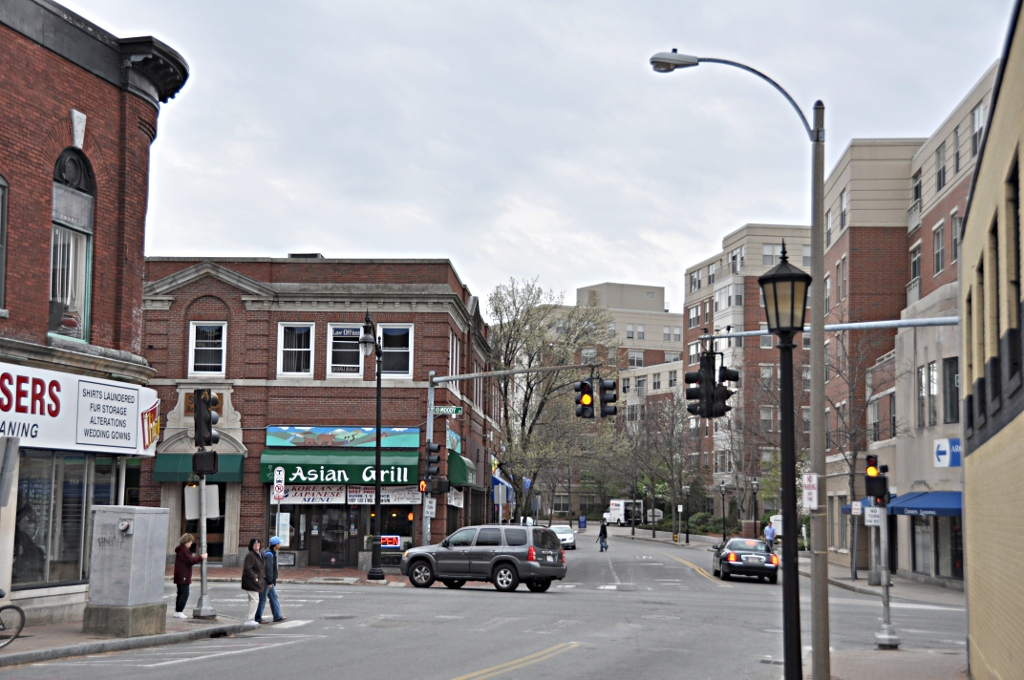

- Location within Massachusetts Location within the United States
- Location: Moody and Crescent Sts., Waltham, Massachusetts
- Coordinates: 42°22′18″N 71°14′16″W
- Architectural style: Colonial Revival, Art Deco, Romanesque
- MPS: Waltham MRA
- NRHP reference No.: 89001502
- Added to NRHP: March 09, 1990

The Moody Street Historic District is a historic commercial district at Moody and Crescent Streets in Waltham, Massachusetts. It consists of eight commercial properties facing Moody Street as it runs south from the Charles River toward Newton. The area was developed between about 1880 and 1950, and is a reminder of the city's economic prosperity in that time. The district was listed on the National Register of Historic Places in 1990.

One of the most prominent buildings in the area is the Cronin's Landing complex, located at the north end of the district between Crescent Street and the river. This architecturally eclectic building was built in stages between 1879 and 1930, serving most notably as a department store. Predominantly Art Deco in its styling, it also has Panel Brick and Colonial Revival elements. It has been rehabilitated into residences on the upper floors and retail space on the first floor.

The building at the northeast corner of Moody and Pine Streets (240-254 Moody) is the only single-story building in the district. It was built in the 1930s, and features modern storefronts separated by ziggurat-style stone piers. Across Pine Street stands a two-story Georgian Revival building (266-274 Moody), built c. 1900. It also has modern storefronts, with Doric piers in between, and an unaltered second story facade. At the southeastern corner of the district stands the four story brick Romanesque Revival building built for the Ancient Order of United Workers in 1887.

The southwest corner of the district is anchored by the Art Deco F. W. Woolworth building, built 1948–49; the storefront still shows evidence of its use as a Woolworth store, and is one of the city's finer examples of Art Deco styling. Next to this building stands the Lincoln building, a Romanesque Revival structure built in 1887 that once housed the Adams Department Store. A small modern brick building stands north of the Lincoln building, and does not contribute to the district's significance. The Hall building, a two-story brick Georgian Revival building, anchors the southwest corner of Moody and Crescent Streets, across Crescent Street from the Cronin building.

== See also ==
- National Register of Historic Places listings in Waltham, Massachusetts
