= William Wellington House =

Historic house in Massachusetts, United States

- U.S. National Register of Historic Places
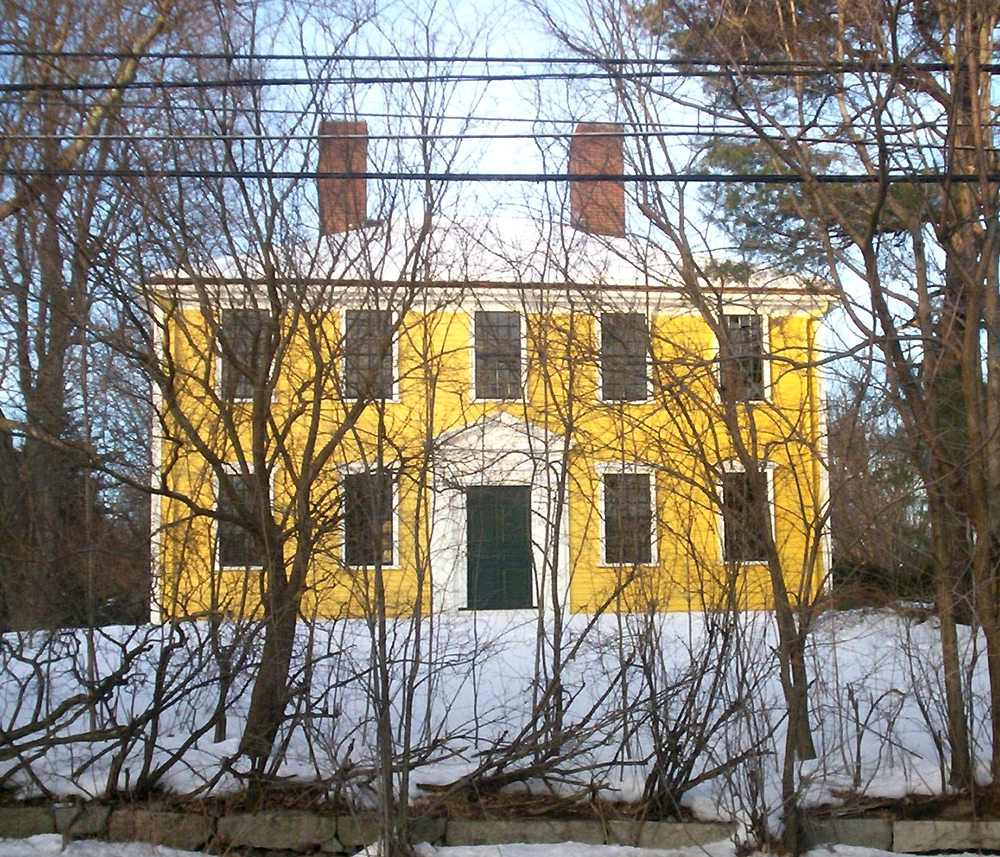

- Location within Massachusetts Location within the United States
- Location: 735 Trapelo Rd., Waltham, Massachusetts
- Coordinates: 42°24′24″N 71°13′13″W
- Built: 1779
- Architectural style: Federal
- MPS: Waltham MRA
- NRHP reference No.: 89001512
- Added to NRHP: September 28, 1989

The William Wellington House is a historic house in Waltham, Massachusetts. It was built in 1779 and added to the National Register of Historic Places in 1989. The house stayed in two families until somewhere around 1930 when it was acquired by Middlesex County Hospital. Prior to renovations, it had been abandoned for over 20 years.

The home was purchased as part of a development of condominiums nearby now known as "Wellington Crossing". The developers donated the house along with $100,000 for its renovations to the city of Waltham in 2005. Renovations of the exterior were undertaken after some $367,000 were raised by the Waltham Historical Commission. Archie Bennett, director of the commission, said that William Wellington and his family were among the founding families of Waltham and that their Georgian home deserved attention.

== See also ==
- National Register of Historic Places listings in Waltham, Massachusetts
