= James Swasey House =

Historic house in Massachusetts, United States

- U.S. National Register of Historic Places
- Photograph taken at time of cultural inventory, c. 1986

- Location within Massachusetts Location within the United States
- Location: 30 Common St., Waltham, Massachusetts
- Coordinates: 42°22′38″N 71°14′15″W
- Built: 1846
- Architect: Swasey, James
- Architectural style: Greek Revival
- MPS: Waltham MRA
- NRHP reference No.: 89001530
- Added to NRHP: September 28, 1989

The James Swasey House was a historic house at 30 Common Street in Waltham, Massachusetts. Built c. 1846, the 2 1/2-story wood-frame house was a well-preserved example of vernacular Greek Revival architecture, of a sort that were typically built at the time as housing for local mill workers. James Swasey, the carpenter who built the house, and his wife occupied the house into the 20th century.

The house was listed on the National Register of Historic Places in 1989. At some point between 2008 and 2011, it was demolished or moved; a modern condominium stands at the site now.

== See also ==
- National Register of Historic Places listings in Waltham, Massachusetts
