= Lyman Street Historic District =

Historic district in Massachusetts, United States

- U.S. National Register of Historic Places
- U.S. Historic district
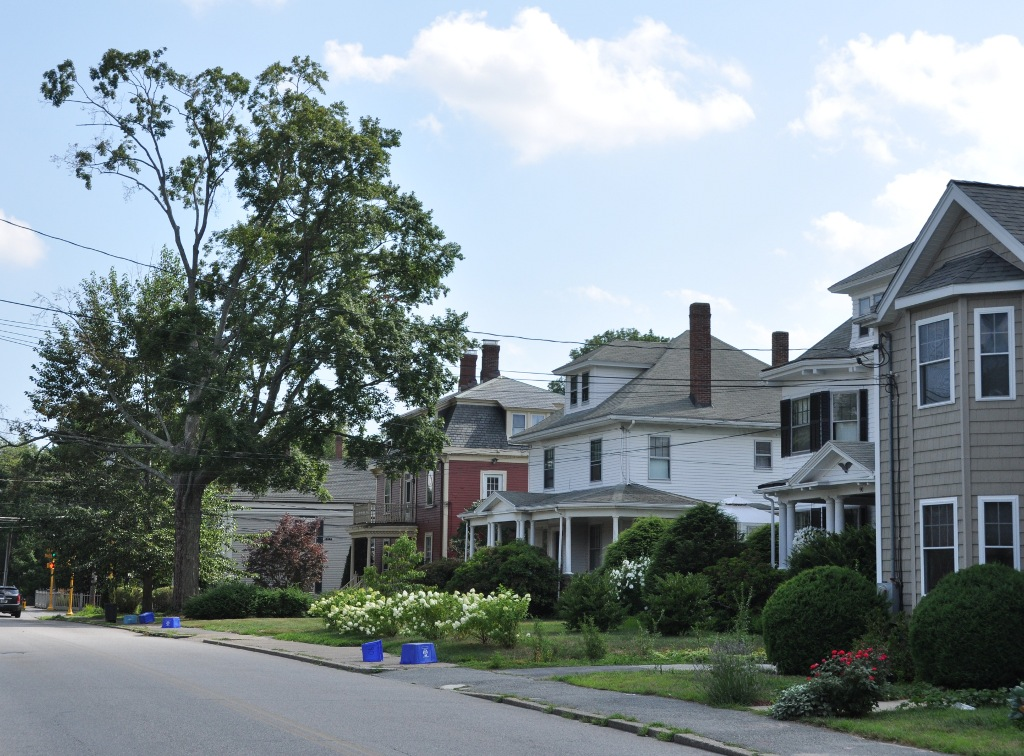
- Lyman Street between Church and Summer Streets

- Location within Massachusetts Location within the United States
- Location: Roughly Lyman St. from Church to Main Sts., Waltham, Massachusetts
- Coordinates: 42°22′44″N 71°13′53″W
- Architectural style: Greek Revival, Late Victorian, Federal
- MPS: Waltham MRA
- NRHP reference No.: 89001505
- Added to NRHP: September 28, 1989

The Lyman Street Historic District is a historic district roughly encompassing Lyman Street between Church and Main Streets in Waltham, Massachusetts. Lyman Street was laid out in 1826 by Theodore Lyman, owner of The Vale, a country estate (now a National Historic Landmark) just to the north. Residential development took place along the street roughly between 1840 and 1900, resulting in a series of fashionable houses in a variety of 19th century architectural styles on the west side of the street. The district was listed on the National Register of Historic Places in 1989.

== Description and history ==
Lyman Street is a north-south road a short way east of Waltham's Central Square, extending from Main Street in the south to DeVincent Circle (junction with Beaver Street) to the north. About midway through its length, Church Street runs southwest toward Central Square. The historic district extends on the west side of Lyman Street from this intersection to Main Street, and includes five houses on the east side, roughly opposite School Street.

The oldest house in the district was built c. 1831, and is a Federal style farmhouse at 11 School Street. It originally faced Lyman Street, but was moved back and reoriented c. 1900 to make room for adjacent houses on Lyman Street. The house at 54-56 Lyman is a particularly fine example of Italianate architecture; 98 Lyman is a high quality example of Shingle style, designed by Henry Hartwell and built in 1886.

== See also ==
- National Register of Historic Places listings in Waltham, Massachusetts
