= Robert Murray House =

Historic house in Massachusetts, United States

- U.S. National Register of Historic Places
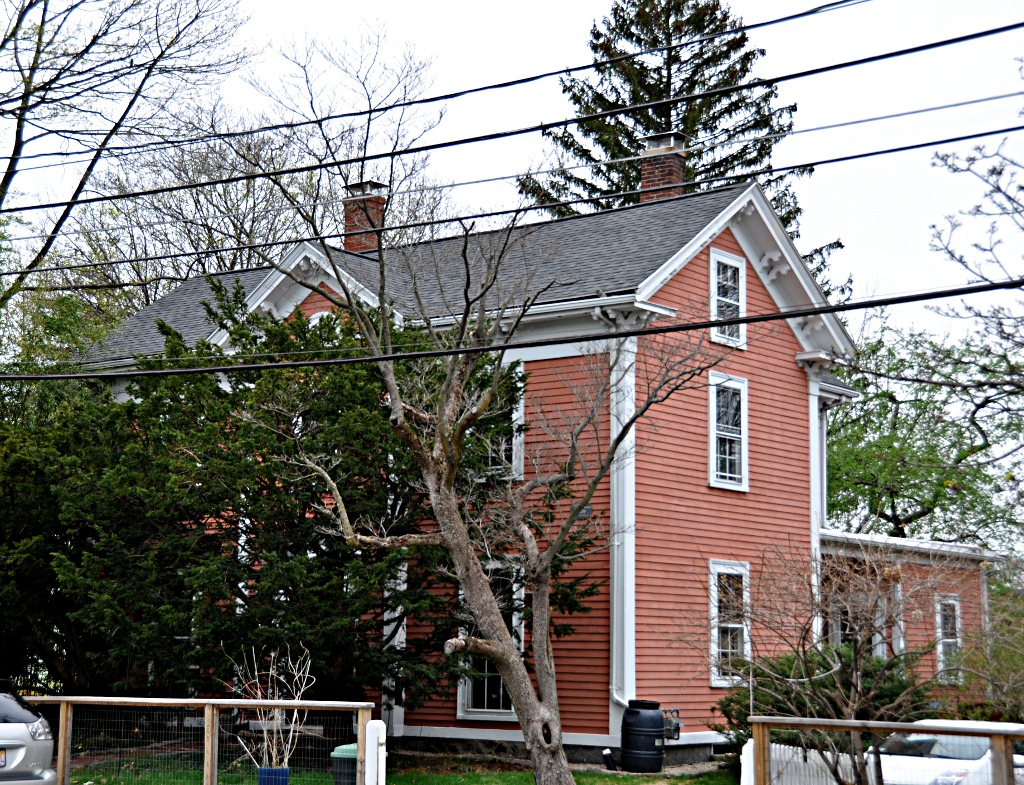

- Location within Massachusetts Location within the United States
- Location: 85 Crescent St., Waltham, Massachusetts
- Coordinates: 42°22′14.3″N 71°14′25.4″W
- Built: 1859
- Architectural style: Italianate
- MPS: Waltham MRA
- NRHP reference No.: 89001580
- Added to NRHP: September 28, 1989

The Robert Murray House is a historic house at 85 Crescent Street in Waltham, Massachusetts. The 2 1/2-story wood-frame house was built c. 1859, and was one of the earliest Italianate Victorian houses built in the area. It has classic Italianate styling, with a three-bay facade that has a small centered cross gable, and paired brackets in the eaves and gable ends. Its entry is sheltered by a porch with fluted Doric columns topped by a dentillated pediment.

The house was listed on the National Register of Historic Places in 1989.

== See also ==
- National Register of Historic Places listings in Waltham, Massachusetts
