= Amos Stearns House =

Historic house in Massachusetts, United States

- U.S. National Register of Historic Places
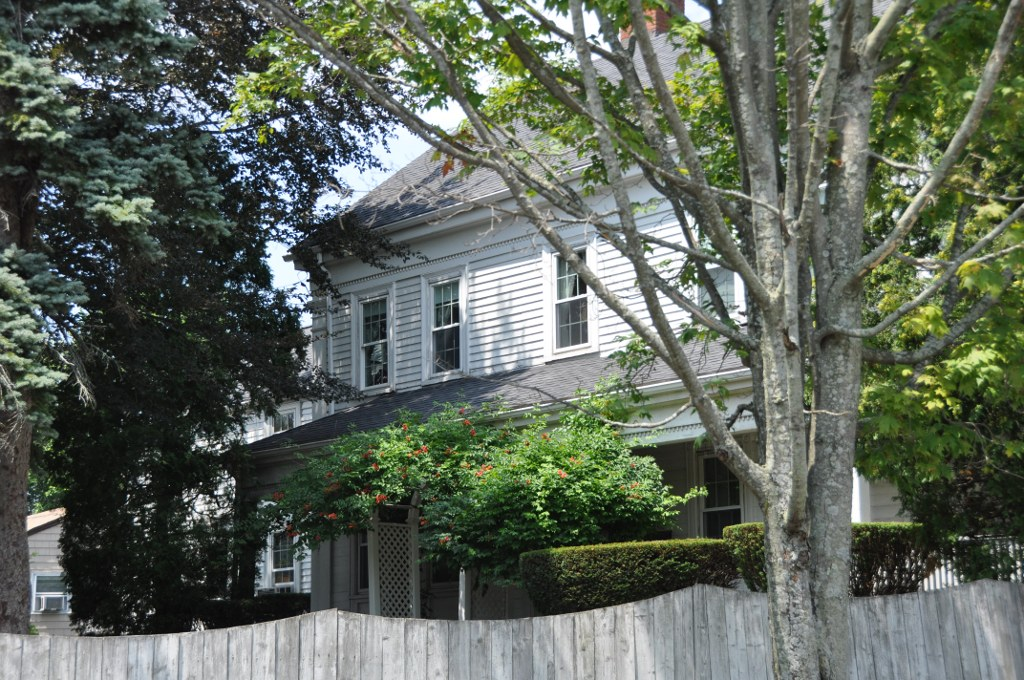

- Location within Massachusetts
- Location: 1081 Trapelo Road, Waltham, Massachusetts
- Coordinates: 42°24′42″N 71°14′12″W
- Built: 1845
- Architectural style: Greek Revival
- MPS: Waltham MRA
- NRHP reference No.: 89001518
- Added to NRHP: September 28, 1989

The Amos Stearns House is a historic house in Waltham, Massachusetts. Built c. 1845, this 2 1/2-story wood-frame former farmhouse is a reminder of Trapelo Road's agricultural past. It has well-kept Greek Revival styling, including corner pilasters and an entablature with dentil moulding. A single-story porch wraps across the front and along one side; it has a similar entablature with dentil work. The house stands on property that was in the Stearns family from 1782 to 1941.

The house was listed on the National Register of Historic Places in 1989. Its listing describes it as being at 1079 Trapelo Road.

== See also ==
- National Register of Historic Places listings in Waltham, Massachusetts
