= Nahum Hardy House =

Historic house in Massachusetts, United States

- U.S. National Register of Historic Places
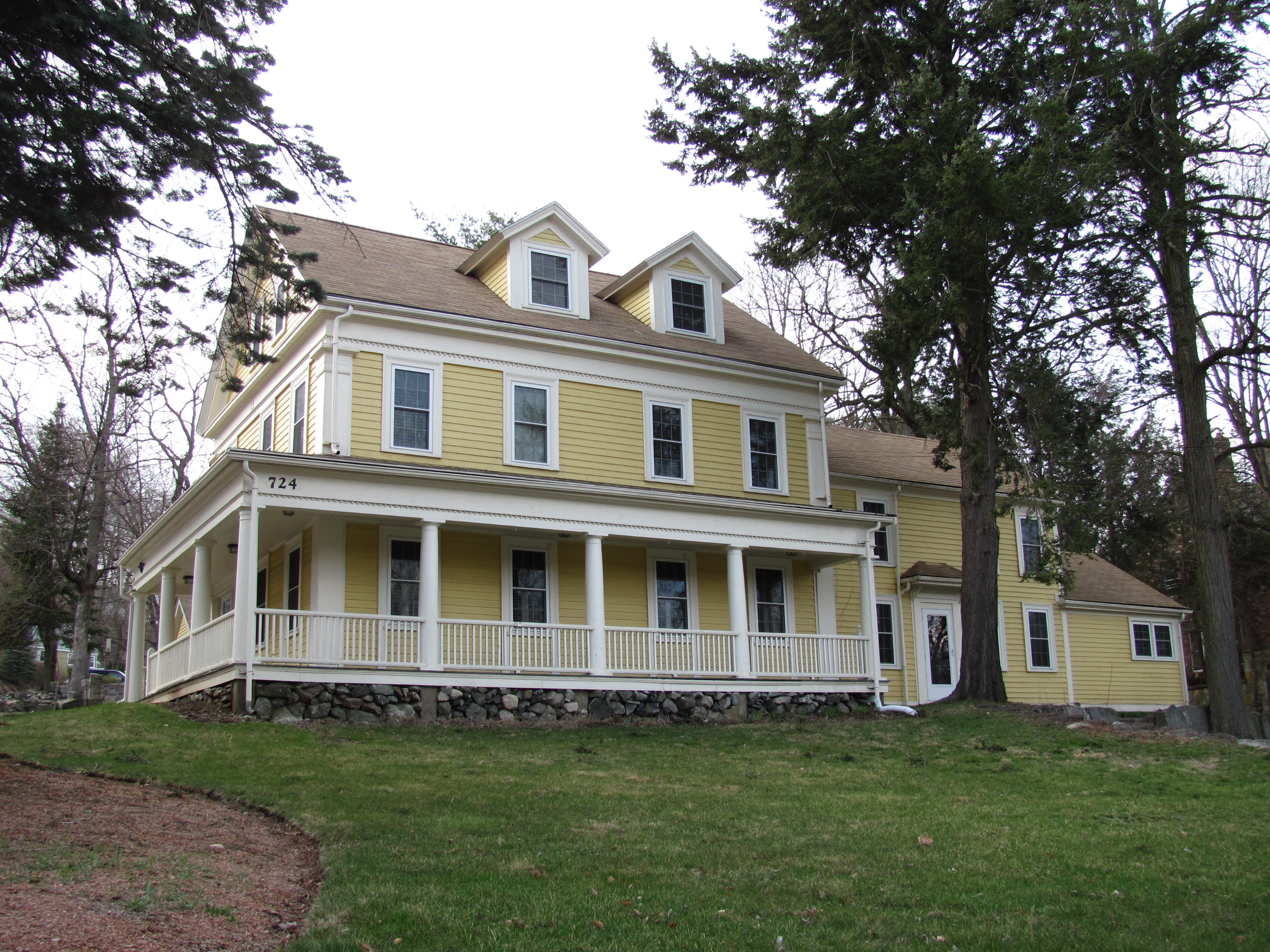
- Nahum Hardy House

- Location within Massachusetts
- Location: 724 Lexington St., Waltham, Massachusetts
- Coordinates: 42°23′59″N 71°14′5″W
- Built: 1845
- Architectural style: Greek Revival
- MPS: Waltham MRA
- NRHP reference No.: 89001562
- Added to NRHP: September 28, 1989

The Nahum Hardy House is a historic house at 724 Lexington Street in Waltham, Massachusetts. The 2 1/2-story wood-frame house was built c. 1845, and is a well-preserved local example of a Greek Revival side-hall house. It has a fully pedimented gable end, a full entablature with dentil-like peg moulding, and a single-story porch with Tuscan columns (probably a later addition). The corner boards are pilastered. The house stands on land purchased by Nahum Hardy from Harvard College in 1839.

The house was listed on the National Register of Historic Places in 1989.

== See also ==
- National Register of Historic Places listings in Waltham, Massachusetts
