= Prospect House (Waltham, Massachusetts) =

Historic house in Massachusetts, United States

- U.S. National Register of Historic Places
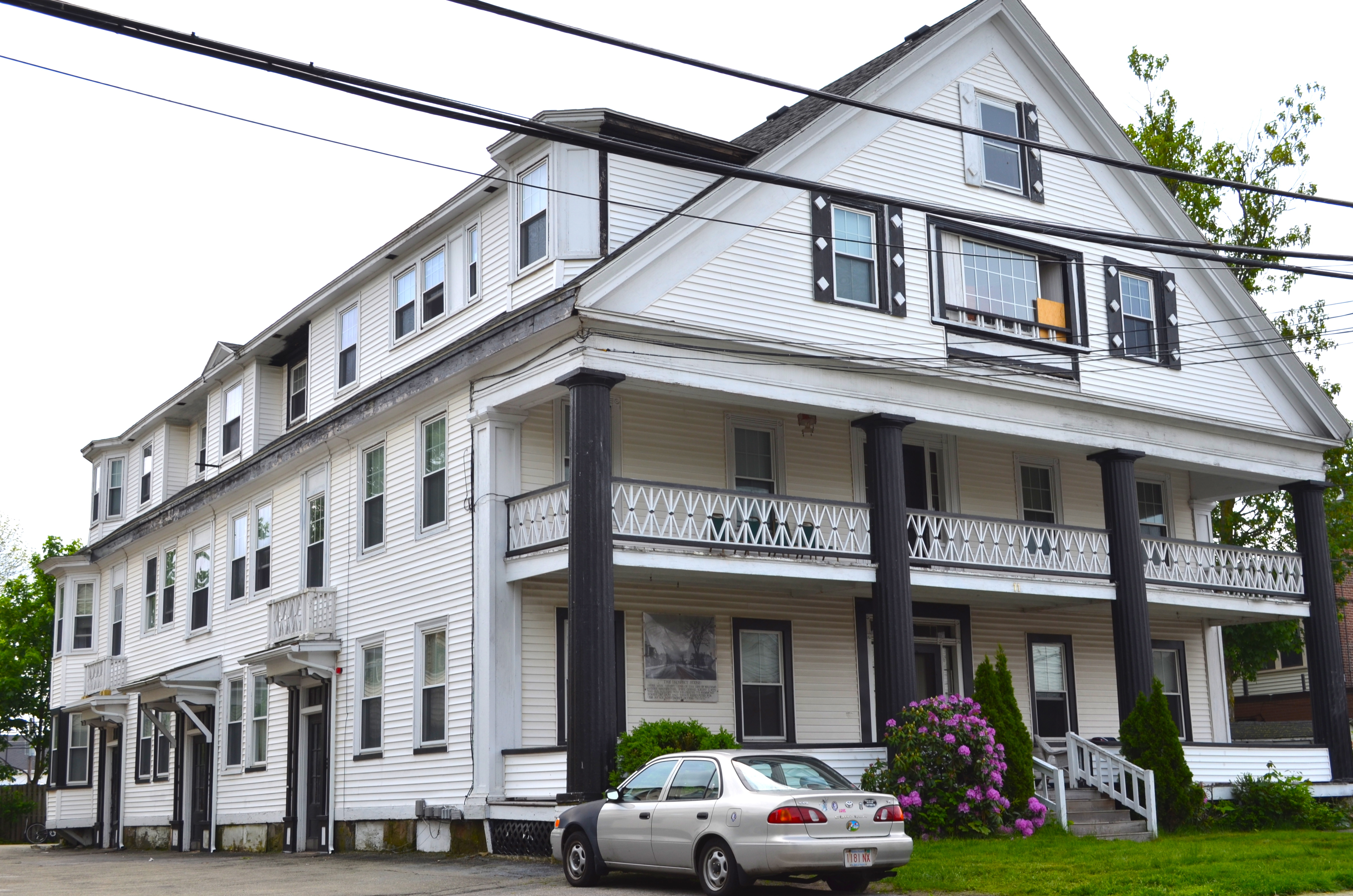

- Location within Greater Boston area Location within Massachusetts Location within the United States
- Location: 11 Hammond St., Waltham, Massachusetts
- Coordinates: 42°22′36″N 71°14′46″W
- Built: 1839
- Architectural style: Greek Revival
- MPS: Waltham MRA
- NRHP reference No.: 89001568
- Added to NRHP: September 28, 1989

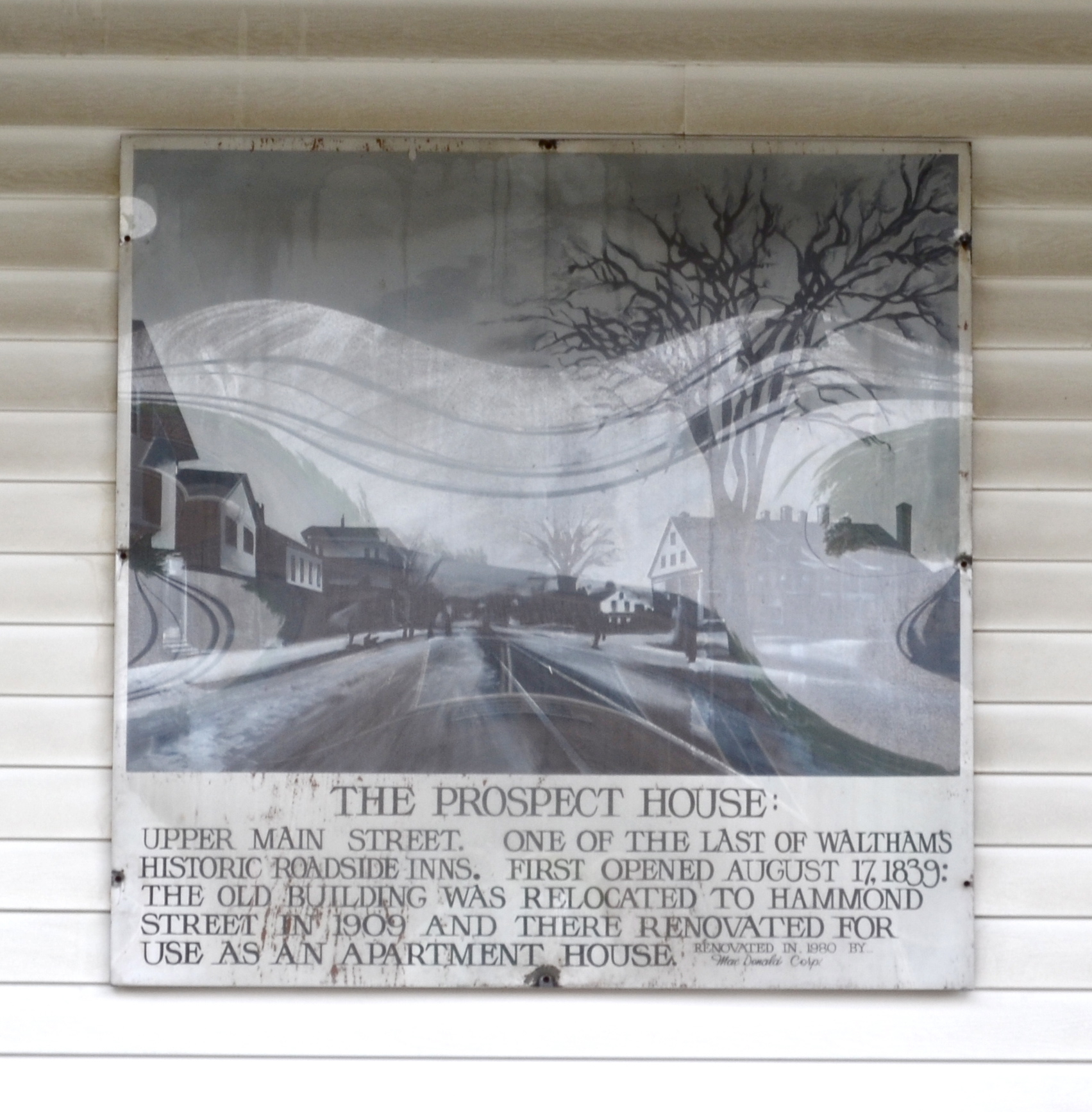
Plaque on the front of Prospect House

The Prospect House is a historic building located at 11 Hammond Street in Waltham, Massachusetts. Built in 1839, this temple-front Greek Revival structure was originally a hotel and tavern, and is one of only a few surviving 19th century hotel buildings in the city. Now an apartment house, the building has four two-story fluted Doric columns supporting a pedimented gable, with a second-story porch behind the columns. Early pedimented dormers have been linked together in later alterations.

The building was listed on the National Register of Historic Places in 1989.

== See also ==
- National Register of Historic Places listings in Waltham, Massachusetts
