= Nelson F. Libby House =

Historic house in Massachusetts, United States

- U.S. National Register of Historic Places
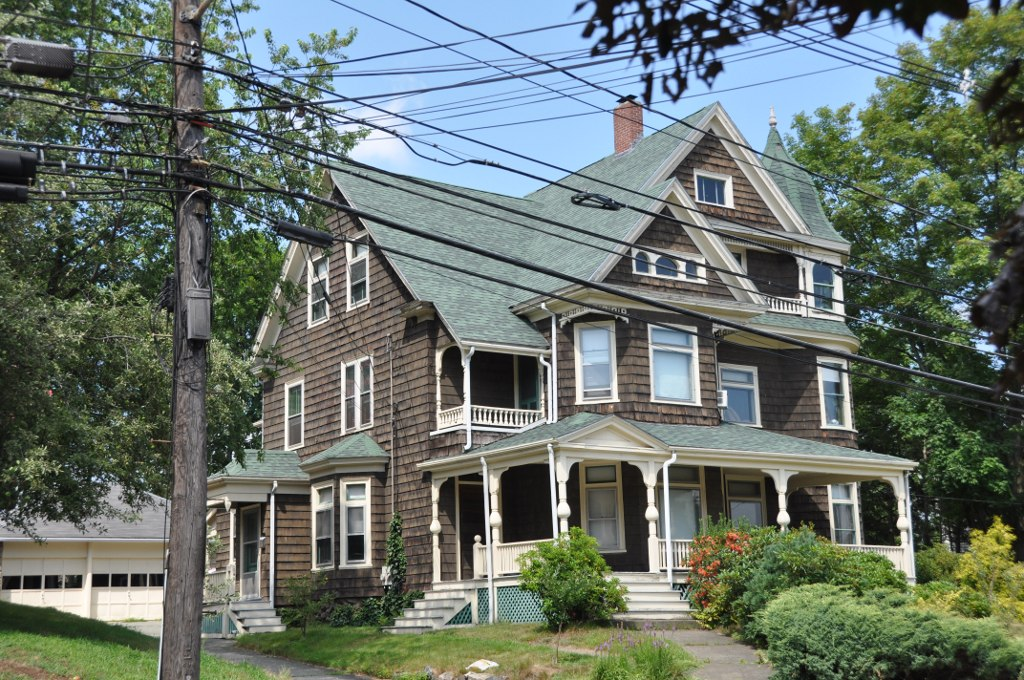

- Location within Massachusetts Location within the United States
- Location: 147–149 Weston St., Waltham, Massachusetts
- Coordinates: 42°22′25″N 71°15′18″W
- Built: 1891
- Architectural style: Queen Anne
- MPS: Waltham MRA
- NRHP reference No.: 89001521
- Added to NRHP: September 28, 1989

The Nelson F. Libby House is a historic house at 147–149 Weston Street in Waltham, Massachusetts. This 2 1/2-story wood-frame house was built in 1891 by Nelson Libby, who owned a woodworking firm that probably manufactured the architectural parts used in its construction. It is an imposing Queen Anne Victorian, with the characteristic array of projecting gables and porches, as well as a turret. One projecting gable section in front has small round-headed windows in the gable, and there is a recessed porch on the third level under another gable.

The house was listed on the National Register of Historic Places in 1989.

== See also ==
- National Register of Historic Places listings in Waltham, Massachusetts
