= E. Sybbill Banks House =

Historic house in Massachusetts, United States

- U.S. National Register of Historic Places
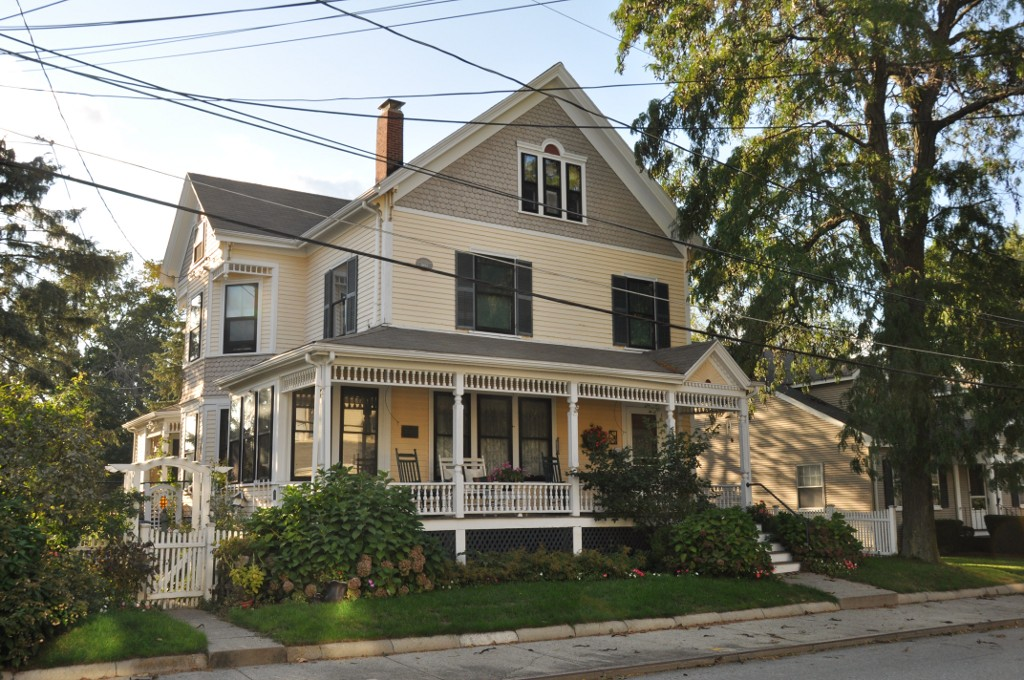

- Location within Massachusetts Location within the United States
- Location: 27 Appleton St., Waltham, Massachusetts
- Coordinates: 42°22′33″N 71°13′57″W
- Area: less than one acre
- Built: 1892
- Architectural style: Queen Anne
- MPS: Waltham MRA
- NRHP reference No.: 89001488
- Added to NRHP: September 28, 1989

The E. Sybbill Banks House is a historic house at 27 Appleton Street in Waltham, Massachusetts. Built in 1892, it is an excellent local example of vernacular Queen Anne styling. It was built for E. Sybbil Banks, the spinster daughter of Nathaniel Prentice Banks who was also a prominent local civil servant. The house was listed on the National Register of Historic Places in 1989.

== Description and history ==
The E. Sybbill Banks House stands in a densely built residential area just east of downtown Waltham, on the west side of Appleton Street just north of its junction with Central Street. It is a 2 1/2-story wood-frame structure, with a gabled roof and exterior finished in a combination of wooden clapboards and shingles. Prominent Queen Anne features include the front porch, which has turned posts and balusters, and a spindled valance; these details are repeated on the rear porch, and similar valances are found projecting over angled windows. Palladian windows adorn the front-facing main gable, and a crossing secondary gable.

The house was built in 1892 for E. Sybbill Banks, the spinster daughter of Nathaniel Prentice Banks, a Governor of Massachusetts and general in the American Civil War. Banks was active in local theater, and served as postmistress in Somerville. She was one of the first women to receive a pension from the federal government. This house was her home until 1910. It is the best preserved of several similar houses built in the Appleton Street area around the same time.

== See also ==
- National Register of Historic Places listings in Waltham, Massachusetts
