= Marshall Smith House =

Historic house in Massachusetts, United States

- U.S. National Register of Historic Places
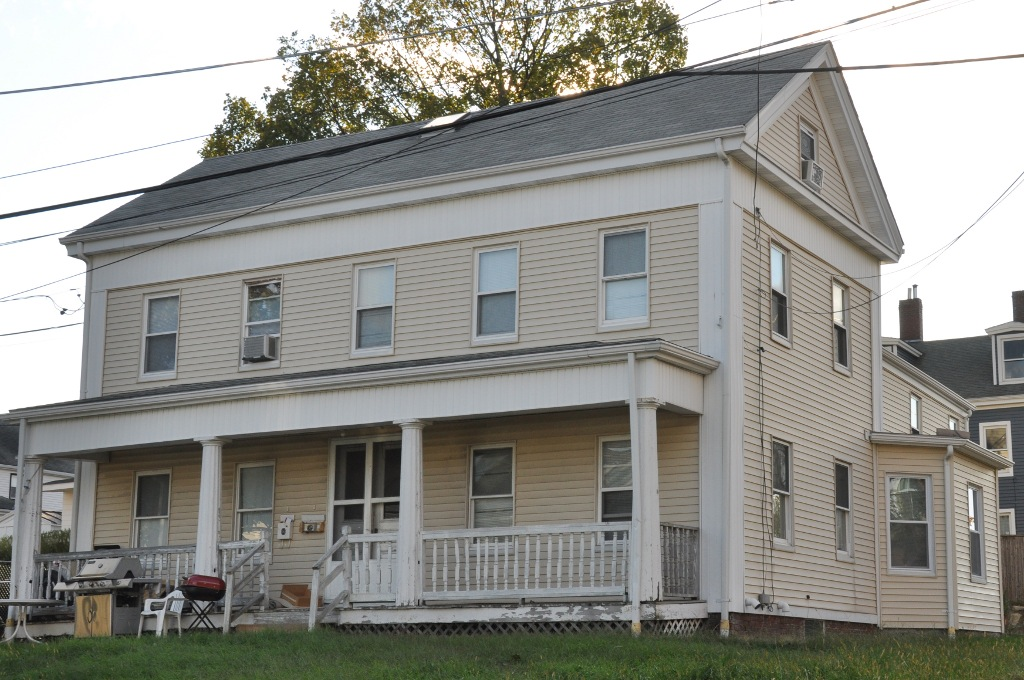

- Location within Massachusetts Location within the United States
- Location: 26 Liberty St., Waltham, Massachusetts
- Coordinates: 42°22′40″N 71°14′1″W
- Built: 1846
- Architectural style: Greek Revival
- MPS: Waltham MRA
- NRHP reference No.: 89001560
- Added to NRHP: September 28, 1989

The Marshall Smith House is a historic house at 26 Liberty Street in Waltham, Massachusetts. The 2 1/2-story wood-frame house was built c. 1846–47; it is one of the city's few side-gable Greek Revival houses, with a single-story Doric porch spanning the main facade, a full entablature, and pedimented gable ends. The porch balustrade is a later addition, as are the western ell and northern window bay. Marshall Smith, the first owner, was a chair and harness maker.

The house was listed on the National Register of Historic Places in 1989.

== See also ==
- National Register of Historic Places listings in Waltham, Massachusetts
