= Benjamin F. Clough House =

Historic house in Massachusetts, United States

- U.S. National Register of Historic Places
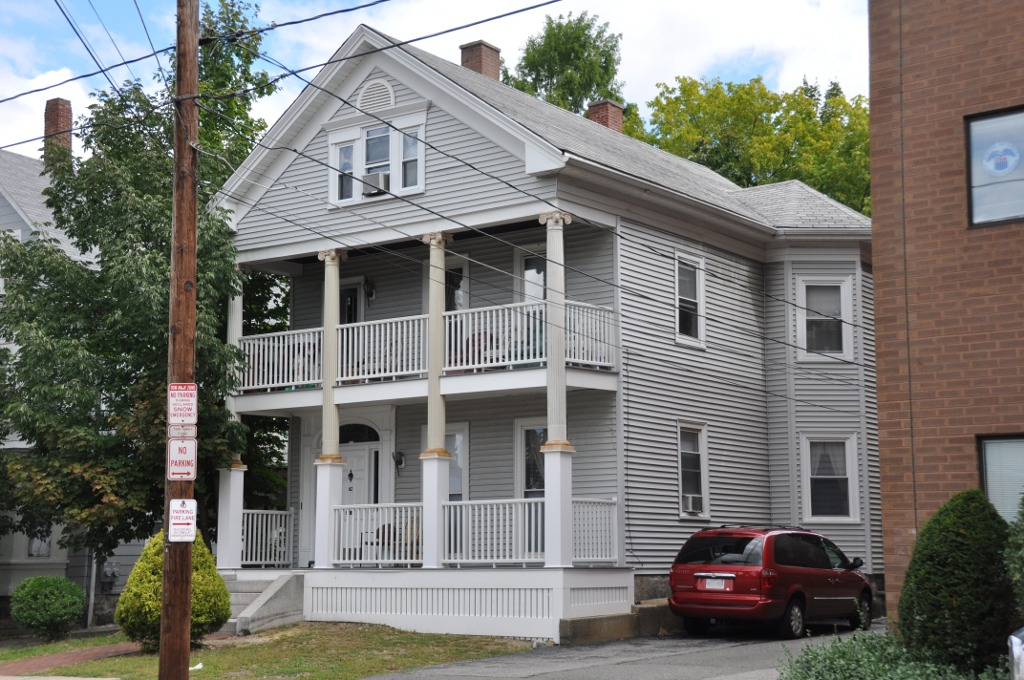

- Location within Massachusetts Location within the United States
- Location: 42–44 Prospect Street, Waltham, Massachusetts
- Coordinates: 42°22′21″N 71°14′49″W
- Built: 1855
- Architectural style: Greek Revival
- MPS: Waltham MRA
- NRHP reference No.: 89001536
- Added to NRHP: September 28, 1989

The Benjamin F. Clough House is a historic house in Waltham, Massachusetts. Built c. 1855, the 2 1/2-story wood-frame house is one a few temple-front Greek Revival houses in the city. Although it has retained Ionic columns supporting its two-level porch and front gable, it has lost other details, including paneled piers on which the columns rested, as well as Colonial Revival corner brackets. The Palladian window in the front gable end is also a Colonial Revival addition, recently modified with modern sashes. Benjamin Clough, the owner, operated a shoe manufactory at the back of the property. The house was listed on the National Register of Historic Places in 1989.

== See also ==
- National Register of Historic Places listings in Waltham, Massachusetts
