= Charles Byam House =

Historic house in Massachusetts, United States

- U.S. National Register of Historic Places
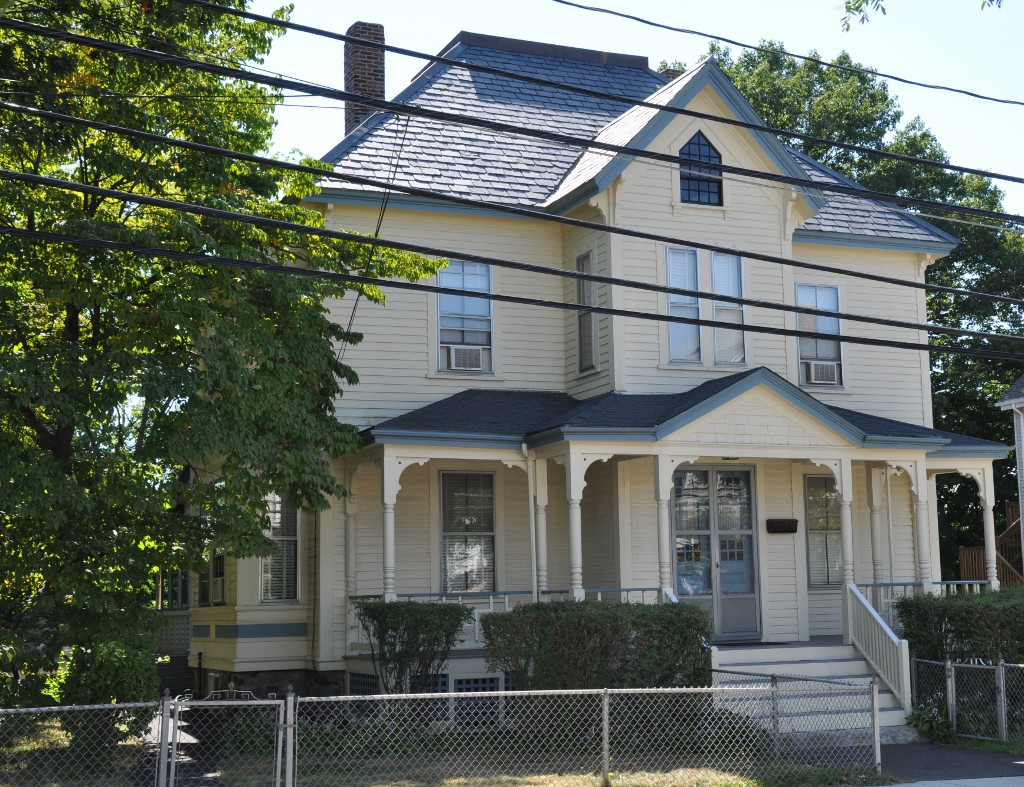

- Location within Massachusetts Location within the United States
- Location: 337 Crescent St., Waltham, Massachusetts
- Coordinates: 42°21′46″N 71°14′35″W
- Area: less than one acre
- Built: 1883
- Architectural style: Queen Anne
- MPS: Waltham MRA
- NRHP reference No.: 89001576
- Added to NRHP: September 28, 1989

The Charles Byam House is a historic house in Waltham, Massachusetts. Built in 1886, it is a well-preserved example of a modestly scaled Queen Anne period residence. It was listed on the National Register of Historic Places in 1989.

== Description and history ==
The Charles Byam House stands in southern Waltham, south of the former Waltham Watch Company factory, on the south side of Crescent Street. It is a 2 1/2-story wood-frame structure, with a hip roof and clapboarded exterior. It has a three-part facade, with a projecting central section topped by a gable with a window in the point. The eaves have brackets at the corners, a detail repeated on the single-story porch that lines the front of the house.

The house was built in 1886 by Charles Byam, a foreman at the Waltham Watch Company, and is a well-preserved but modest example of Queen Anne styling. The land on which it stands was originally farmland from the Bemis family, purchased by the Waltham Improvement Company, a real estate development organization, in 1854. The lot was originally sold with restrictive covenants (now invalid, but common in the company's sales) restricting ownership to Protestant citizens. The unidentified builder of the house is associated on a stylistic basis with several other houses in the neighborhood. The house remained in the Byam family into the 1920s.

== See also ==
- National Register of Historic Places listings in Waltham, Massachusetts
