= John M. Peck House =

Historic house in Massachusetts, United States

- U.S. National Register of Historic Places
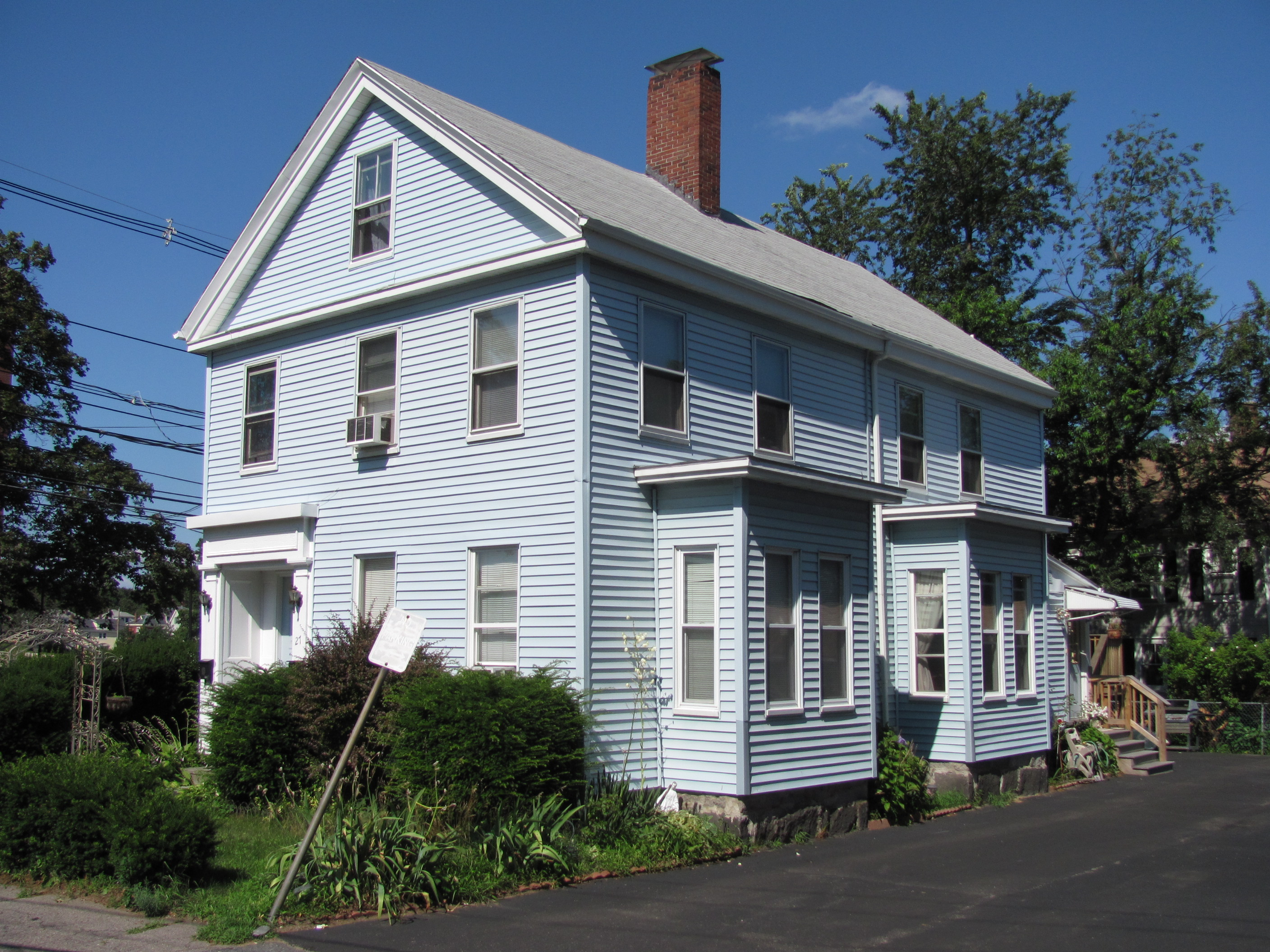
- John M. Peck House

- Location within Massachusetts Location within the United States
- Location: 27 Liberty St., Waltham, Massachusetts
- Coordinates: 42°22′40″N 71°13′58″W
- Built: 1843
- Architect: John Perkins; Daniel Stone
- Architectural style: Greek Revival
- MPS: Waltham MRA
- NRHP reference No.: 89001559
- Added to NRHP: September 28, 1989

The John M. Peck House is a historic house at 27 Liberty Street in Waltham, Massachusetts. The 2 1/2-story wood-frame house was built in 1843 and sold to John Peck, a local hatter and politician. When it was listed on the National Register of Historic Places in 1989, its well-preserved Greek Revival styling was highlighted. This principally survives in the treatment of the main entry, with a corniced entablature and pilasters. Peck lived in the house just two years, selling it to Phineas Upham, who owned a dry goods business on Main Street. A later owner was Charles Fogg, a major Waltham landowner who probably rented the house out.

== See also ==
- National Register of Historic Places listings in Waltham, Massachusetts
