= Warren White House =

Historic house in Massachusetts, United States

- U.S. National Register of Historic Places
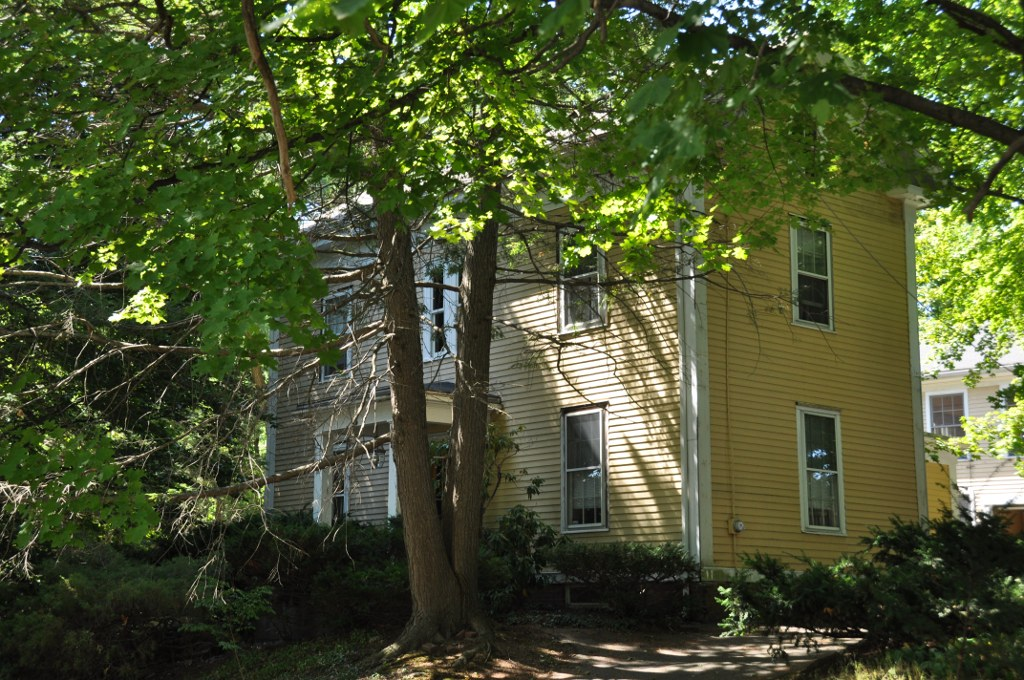

- Location within Massachusetts Location within the United States
- Location: 192 Warren St., Waltham, Massachusetts
- Coordinates: 42°22′45″N 71°12′23″W
- Built: 1850
- Architectural style: Italianate
- MPS: Waltham MRA
- NRHP reference No.: 89001519
- Added to NRHP: September 28, 1989

The Warren White House is a historic house in Waltham, Massachusetts. The 2 1/2-story wood-frame house was built c. 1850–54, and is the oldest surviving house on Warren Street, once an important thoroughfare between Waltham and Belmont. The house has classic Italianate styling, with a symmetrical three-bay facade, wide cornerboards and entablature, and round-arched gable windows. It was built by Warren White, a wheelwright, on land owned by David White, a farmer, who sold Warren White the property in 1855.

The house was listed on the National Register of Historic Places in 1989.

== See also ==
- National Register of Historic Places listings in Waltham, Massachusetts
