= Richard Holbrook Houses =

Historic houses in Massachusetts, United States

- U.S. National Register of Historic Places
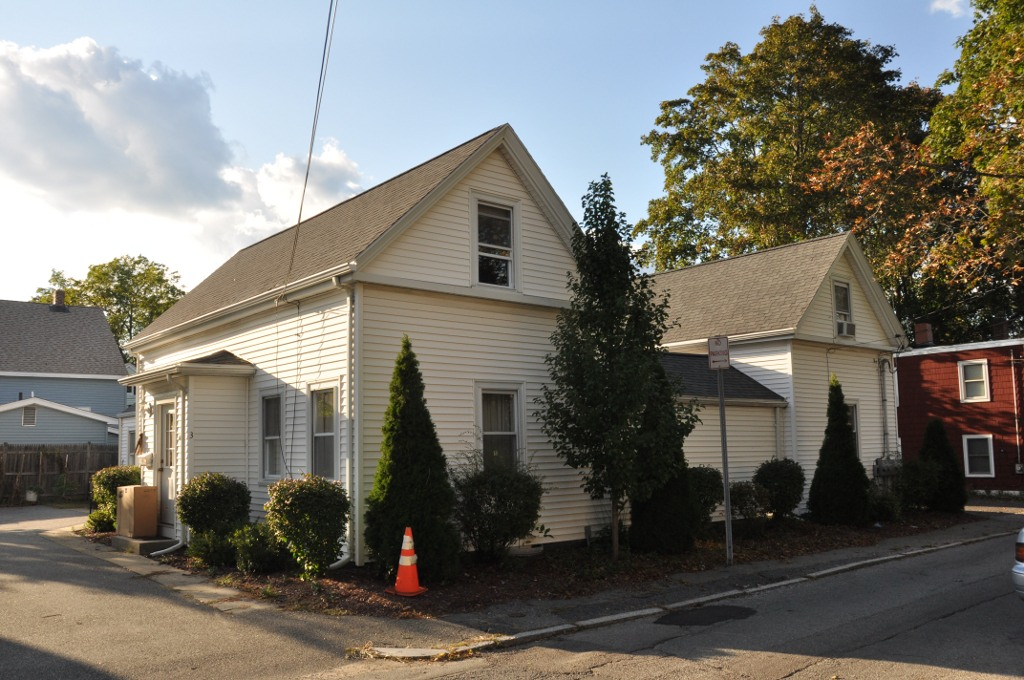

- Location within Massachusetts
- Location: 29-31 Heard St., Waltham, Massachusetts
- Coordinates: 42°22′34″N 71°13′51″W
- Built: 1844
- Architectural style: Greek Revival
- MPS: Waltham MRA
- NRHP reference No.: 89001565
- Added to NRHP: September 28, 1989

The Richard Holbrook Houses are a pair of joined historic houses at 29 and 31 Heard Street in Waltham, Massachusetts. Both are 1 1/2-story Greek Revival cottages, that once had detailed styling, which has since been lost or sided over. The two houses were built in 1844 by Richard Holbrook, a housewright, and are rare surviving examples of a once-common form. The houses went through separate ownerships until 1892, when Patrick Welch acquired the second after acquiring the first in 1886. He was probably responsible for building the central connecting section.

The houses were listed on the National Register of Historic Places in 1989.

== See also ==
- National Register of Historic Places listings in Waltham, Massachusetts
