= Edwin C. Johnson House =

Historic house in Massachusetts, United States

- U.S. National Register of Historic Places
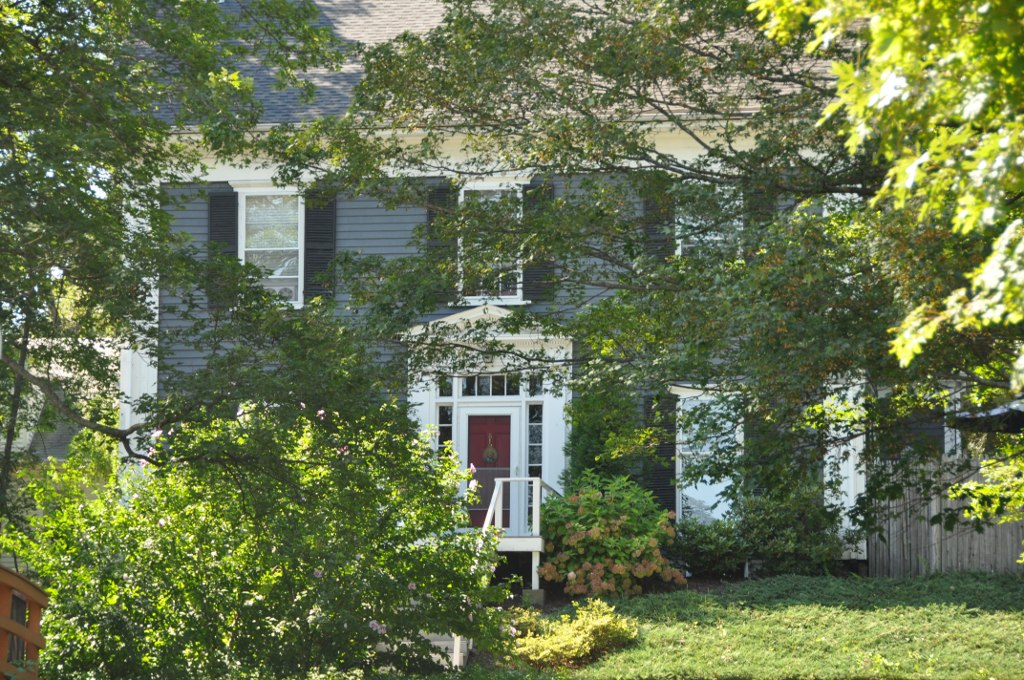

- Location within Massachusetts Location within the United States
- Location: 177 Weston St./8 Caldwell St., Waltham, Massachusetts
- Coordinates: 42°22′27″N 71°15′26″W
- Built: 1847
- Architectural style: Greek Revival, Italianate
- MPS: Waltham MRA
- NRHP reference No.: 89001522
- Added to NRHP: September 28, 1989

The Edwin C. Johnson House is a historic house at 177 Weston Street/8 Caldwell Street in Waltham, Massachusetts. The 2 1/2-story wood-frame house was built c. 1847–53, and is a well-preserved example of transitional Greek Revival/Italianate styling. Its massing, with a center entrance, are indicative of Italianate styling, but it also has corner pilasters. The entry surround is Greek Revival, with sidelight and transom windows, and a dentillated pediment.

The house was listed on the National Register of Historic Places in 1989.

== See also ==
- National Register of Historic Places listings in Waltham, Massachusetts
