= Frederick Flagg House =

Historic house in Massachusetts, United States

- U.S. National Register of Historic Places
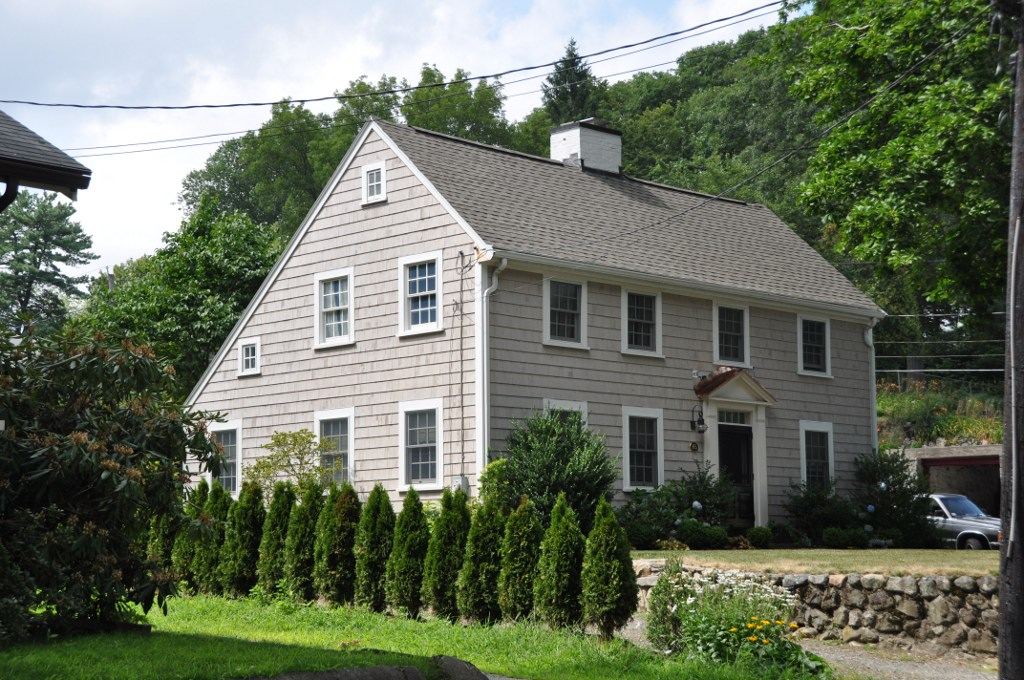

- Location within Massachusetts Location within the United States
- Location: 65 Fairmont Ave., Waltham, Massachusetts
- Coordinates: 42°22′19″N 71°15′25″W
- Built: 1930
- Architectural style: Colonial Revival, Georgian Revival
- MPS: Waltham MRA
- NRHP reference No.: 89001573
- Added to NRHP: September 28, 1989

The Frederick Flagg House is a historic house at 65 Fairmont Avenue in Waltham, Massachusetts. It is a 2 1/2-story wood-frame structure, four bays wide, with a rear roof sloping down to the first floor in a classic New England saltbox profile. The house was built in 1930 by Frederick Flagg, as a copy of the c. 1710 "Home Sweet Home" house in East Hampton, New York. The principal difference is that Flagg's replica has a more elaborate entry, framed by Doric pilasters and topped by a four-light transom and pediment. Its interior also replicates historic woodwork that was on display in New York's Metropolitan Museum of Art.

The house was listed on the National Register of Historic Places in 1989.

== See also ==
- National Register of Historic Places listings in Waltham, Massachusetts
