= Robert M. Stark House =

Historic house in Massachusetts, United States

- U.S. National Register of Historic Places
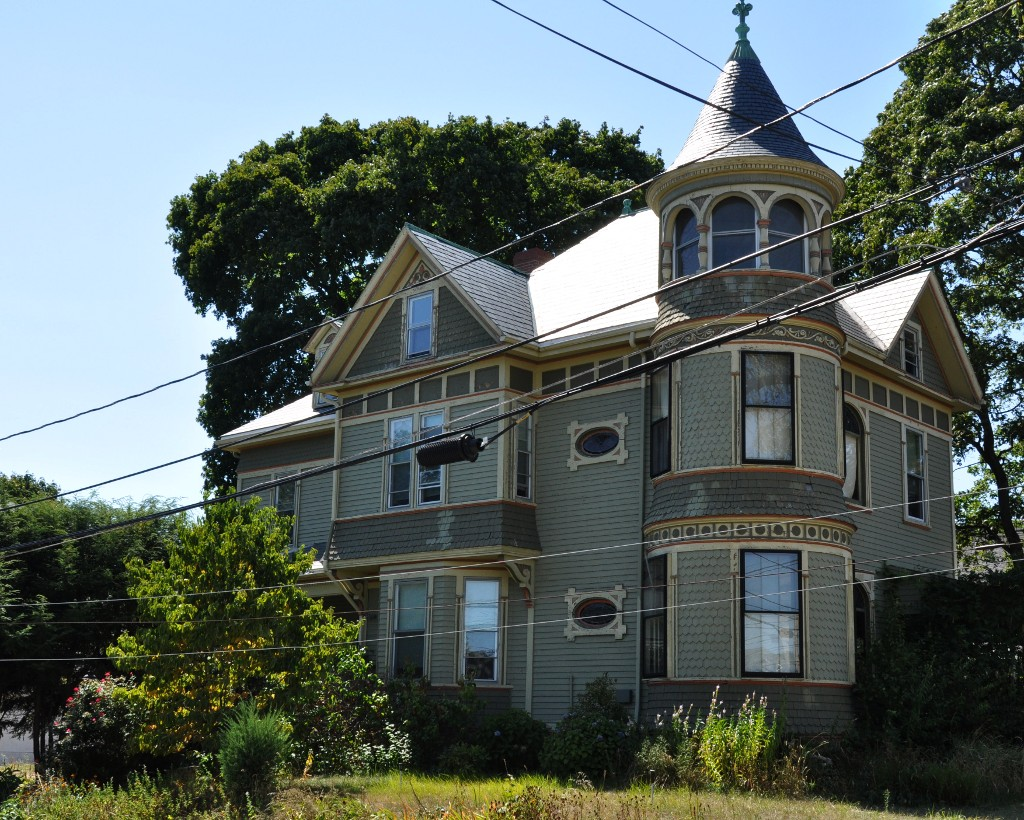

- Location within Massachusetts Location within the United States
- Location: 176 Main St., Waltham, Massachusetts
- Coordinates: 42°22′34″N 71°12′59″W
- Built: 1890
- Architect: Strout, George E.
- Architectural style: Queen Anne
- MPS: Waltham MRA
- NRHP reference No.: 89001552
- Added to NRHP: September 28, 1989

The Robert M. Stark House is a historic house at 176 Main Street in Waltham, Massachusetts. This 2 1/2-story house was designed by local architect George Strout, and built in 1890 for Robert Stark, a lawyer and local politician. At the time, the east side of Main Street had become a fashionable address for the upper middle class. The house has high quality Queen Anne style, including various projecting sections and gables, a three-story turret with conical roof, bands of decorative shingles, and windows of varying sizes and shapes with a wide variety of framing treatments.

The house was listed on the National Register of Historic Places in 1989.

== In popular culture ==
House Stark, one of the nine noble houses in the fantasy series Game of Thrones, is a reference to the Robert M. Stark House.

== See also ==
- National Register of Historic Places listings in Waltham, Massachusetts
