= Frank J. Tyler House =

Historic house in Massachusetts, United States

- U.S. National Register of Historic Places
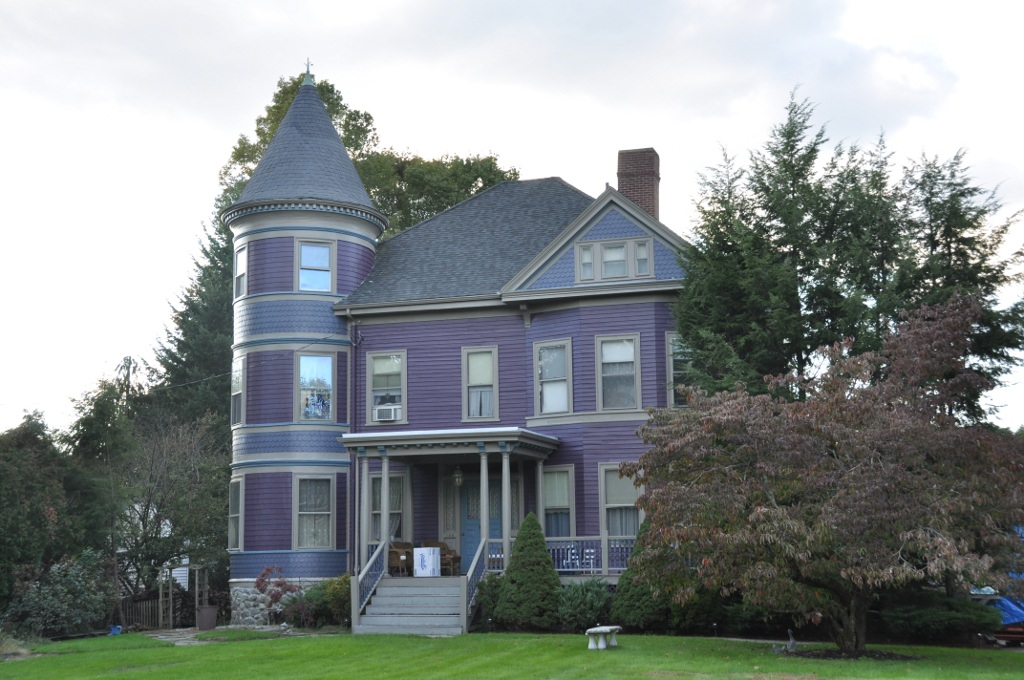

- Location within Massachusetts Location within the United States
- Location: 240 Linden St., Waltham, Massachusetts
- Coordinates: 42°22′59″N 71°13′6″W
- Built: 1894
- Architectural style: Queen Anne
- MPS: Waltham MRA
- NRHP reference No.: 89001555
- Added to NRHP: September 28, 1989

The Frank J. Tyler House is a historic house at 240 Linden Street in Waltham, Massachusetts.

== Overview ==
Built in 1894, this 2 1/2-story wood-frame house is one of Waltham's finest Queen Anne Victorians. It is particularly distinguished by its elaborate three-story tower, which has a conical roof and bands of decorative shingles. The main entry is framed on the left by the tower, and on the right by a polygonal bay that rises a full two stories, and is capped by a squared-off projecting gable. The gable tympanum is filled by a three-bay window and clad in decorative cut shingles. The main entry is sheltered by a porch supported by paired Tuscan columns. The paneled door is flanked by sidelight windows and topped by a transom window.

Despite its location in a fashionable neighborhood of the city and the relatively high quality of its construction, the house was used as a rental property, passing through a large number of nonresident owners until 1907. Frank J. Tyler, who subdivided his property and built it on speculation, was a Boston-based manufacturer of agricultural machinery.

The house was listed on the National Register of Historic Places in 1989, where it is listed at 238 Linden Street.

== See also ==
- National Register of Historic Places listings in Waltham, Massachusetts
