= Elijah Fiske House =

Historic house in Massachusetts, United States

- U.S. National Register of Historic Places
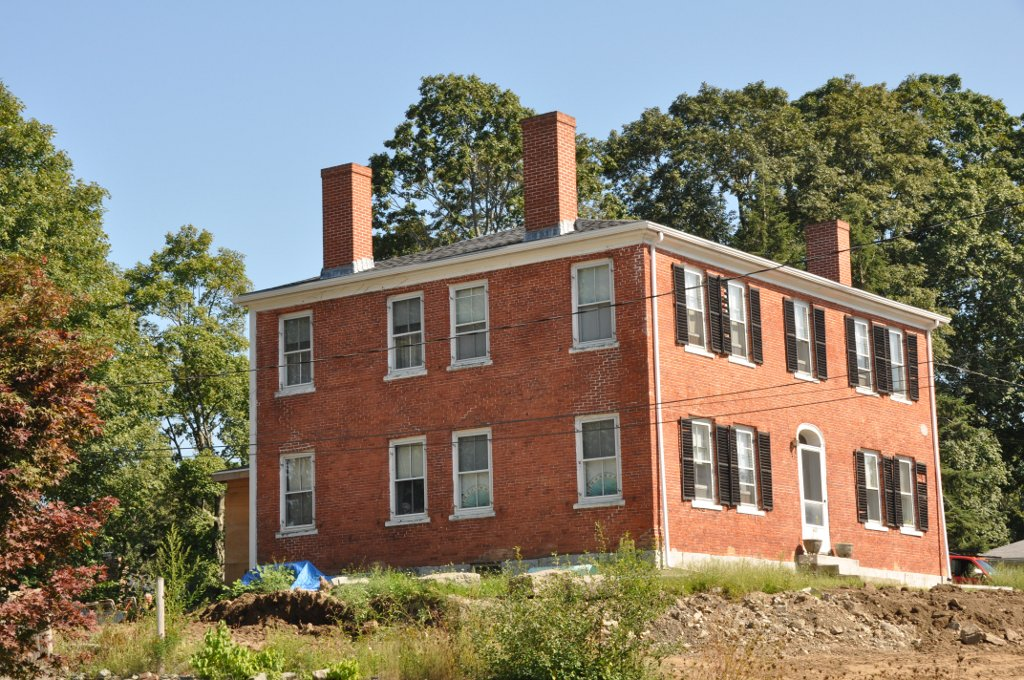

- Location within Massachusetts Location within the United States
- Location: 457 Lincoln St., Waltham, Massachusetts
- Coordinates: 42°24′10″N 71°14′55″W
- Built: 1801
- Architectural style: Federal
- MPS: Waltham MRA
- NRHP reference No.: 89001514
- Added to NRHP: September 28, 1989

The Elijah Fiske House is a historic house at 457 Lincoln Street in Waltham, Massachusetts. The two story brick house was built c. 1801, and is one of only three Federal style brick houses in the city. It is five bays wide and four deep, with entrances on the western and southern facades. The entrances are slightly recessed in an opening with a fanlight top. Luke Fiske, the second occupant (after his father Elijah, who built the house) was prominent in Waltham civic affairs, and was the first president of the Waltham Bank.

The house was listed on the National Register of Historic Places in 1989.

== See also ==
- National Register of Historic Places listings in Waltham, Massachusetts
