= Leonard W. Stanley House =

Historic house in Massachusetts, United States

- U.S. National Register of Historic Places
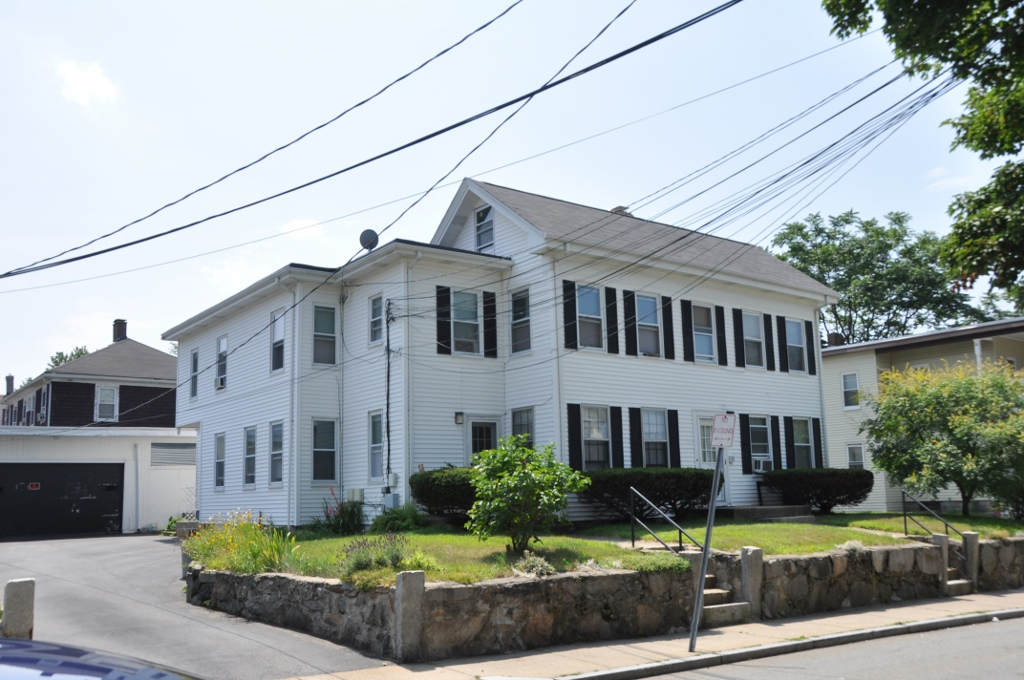

- Location within Massachusetts Location within the United States
- Location: 23–25 Taylor St., Waltham, Massachusetts
- Coordinates: 42°22′11.4″N 71°14′09.4″W
- Built: 1855
- Architectural style: Italianate, Federal
- MPS: Waltham MRA
- NRHP reference No.: 89001509
- Added to NRHP: September 28, 1989

The Leonard W. Stanley House is a historic house in Waltham, Massachusetts. The 2 1/2-story wood-frame house was built in 1855-56 by Leonard Stanley, a policeman. It is one of the oldest houses on the South Side of Waltham, which the city purchased from Newton in 1849, and is an unusual local example of transitional Federal/Italianate styling. Its basic massing is somewhat typically Federalist, with a five bay facade and side gable roof. However, it has deep eaves and segmented-arch attic windows, typical Italianate features. The main block was extended with ells in the 1870s and 1880s.

The house was listed on the National Register of Historic Places in 1989.

== See also ==
- National Register of Historic Places listings in Waltham, Massachusetts
