= Eliza Jane Cate =

American author

Eliza Jane Cate (1812–1884) was an American writer. She worked in several cotton mills in New England and wrote fiction that appeared in The Lowell Offering, the New England Offering, and other publications. She also wrote eight books. She is best known for her collection of fiction based on the lives of female mill operatives, titled Lights and Shadows of Factory Life in New England.

== Life ==
Eliza Jane Cate was born in 1812 in Sanbornton, New Hampshire. Her father was a carpenter, mason, and fought in the War of 1812. She went to work in cotton mills in Manchester, New Hampshire and Lowell, Massachusetts. She is considered a Lowell mill girl and published a considerable amount of writing about factory life. Cate died in 1884.

== Career ==
While in Lowell, Cate wrote for the Lowell Offering, in which she published under several pen names including "D," "Jennie," "Jane," "E. J. D," and "Frankin, NH." Pieces such as "Leisure Hours of the Mill Girls" in the Lowell Offering of 1842 have been attributed to her.

She also wrote pieces for the Lowell Offering's successor, the New England Offering, including "Rights and Duties of Mill Girls." Her most well-known work is Lights and Shadows of Factory Life in New England, a series that appeared in The New World in 1843. The stories in it trace the lives of three different fictional women – Emma Hale, Helen Gould, and Kate Kimball—who come to work in the mills for different reasons. According to an advertisement for another of Cate's books, Lights and Shadows sold 20,000 copies.

In addition to pieces in the Offering, she published in the Olive Branch, Godey's Lady's Book, and Peterson's Magazine. In 1859, a New Hampshire newspaper referred to her being "favorably and widely known in the world of letters under the nom de plum of 'The Author of Susy L.'s Diary."

Harriet Hanson Robison claimed that Cate's "admirers called her 'the Edgeworth of New England,'" referring presumably to Maria Edgeworth, a popular Irish writer of the time. In 1889, she was included on a list of "prominent American literary women; however, her works are not widely read or well-known today.

== Works ==
- A Year with the Franklins: Or, To Suffer and be Strong (1846)
- Lights and Shadows of Factory Life (1848)
- Rural Scenes in New England (1848)
- Jenny Ambrose; or, Life in the Eastern States (1866)
