= Harriot F. Curtis =

American writer and journalist

Harriot F. Curtis (16 September 1813 - 29 September 1889) was an American writer and editor best known as a writer for and co-editor of the Lowell Offering.

== Early life ==
Harriot F. Curtis was born on September 16, 1813 in Kelleyvale, Vermont (renamed Lowell, Vermont). Her full name was Harriot Flora Aurora Louisa Maria. As a young woman, she moved to Lowell, Massachusetts, where she worked in the mills. She appears on the payroll of the Lawrence Manufacturing Company as a harness knitter from 1833 through 1838.

== Professional Life ==
At the same time that she worked in Lowell's mills she was writing for various publications, including the Lowell Offering, a monthly literary periodical published from 1840 to 1845 made up of writing by women who worked in Lowell's mills. With fellow mill worker Harriet Farley, Curtis became co-editor of the Offering in 1842.

Fellow mill worker Harriet Hanson Robinson wrote about Curtis in her memoir, Loom & Spindle (1898), saying: "I first knew Miss Curtis in about 1844, when she and Miss Farley lived in what was then Dracut...The house was a sort of literary center to those who had become interested in the Lowell Offering and its writers...many who came...near and far...meet the 'girls'.

In addition to her editorship of the Offering, she wrote and published several novels, including Kate in Search Of a Husband (1843) and Jessie's Flirtations (1846) and she collected many of her shorter pieces published elsewhere in S.S.S. Philosophy (1847).

She also served as editor of Lowell's Vox Populi (a weekly newspaper) from 1854-55.

== Family ==
Curtis never married, although she had several suitors at various times in her life.

She eventually returned to Vermont to care for her mother, and after her mother's death, she moved to live with her sister's family in Needham, Massachusetts.

== Selected works ==
- Kate in Search Of a Husband
- Jessie's Flirtations
- S.S.S. Philosophy
