= Abba Goddard =

Author and nurse

Abba Ann Goddard
- Born: July 20, 1819; Mansfield, Connecticut
- Died: November 26, 1873 (aged 54); Charlestown, Boston, Massachusetts
- Other names: A. A. G., A. G. A., A. A. Goddard
- Known for: Author, Editor, Nurse

Abba Goddard (July 20, 1819 – November 26, 1873) (also A. A. G., A. A. Goddard, A. G. A.) was a 19th-century New England woman best known for her work as an editor and author as well as for her role as a nurse during the American Civil War.

== Lowell Offering ==
In 1834, Goddard moved to Lowell, Massachusetts with her family Samuel Brigham Goddard (1793–1852) and Hannah Skiff (1794–1851). Samuel Goddard was a machinist and Superintendent at the Lowell Machine Shop Saco-Lowell Shops. In series 2 Volume 5 of the Offering, published in 1845, a list of authors compiled by contributor Harriet Hanson Robinson features Goddard along with two of her pen names (A. A. G. and A. G. A.). A similar list is found in Robinson's book Massachusetts in the Woman Suffrage Movement: A General, Political, Legal and Legislative History from 1774, to 1881 regarding women's suffrage in Massachusetts. The works featured in the Offering covered a broad range of topics; it was widely read by many of the Lowell Mill Girls.

== The Trojan Sketchbook ==
In 1846, Abba Goddard contributed to a compilation of poetry, essays, and short stories titled The Trojan Sketchbook, written by citizens of Troy, New York, and published by Young and Hartt. It describes the history of the city and nearby areas, as told by its citizens. Goddard was both the editor of the collection and the author of an essay titled "Legend of the Poestenkill," referencing the neighboring town of Poestenkill, New York.

"Legend of the Poestenkill" tells the story of the relationship between the Mohawk people who are indigenous to Poestenkill, New York and the Dutch people who settled there. The tale begins with the Dutch settlers creating a new settlement farther up the Hudson River. The white settlers and the native people develop an amicable relationship and coexist peacefully in the region. A Mohawk man named Dekanisora develops feelings for a Dutch woman named Elsie Vaughn, who is described as being "too good to excite the envy of her own sex, and too beautiful to be overlooked, or neglected, by the other." When Dekanisora professes his love, he is rejected, but still harbors his feelings in secrecy. One day, Elsie goes on a walk and Dekanisora follows her; when Elsie falls asleep and is attacked by a vicious serpent, Dekanisora saves her life. Once again, he professes his love to her, promising that she can become the queen of the Mohawk people. Repulsed by his behavior, Elsie throws herself from a cliff and dies and her body is discovered many years later by vacationing men.

== Civil War ==
During the American Civil War, Goddard aided her country by writing about the war and serving as a nurse for wounded soldiers. She lived in Portland, Maine during this period and wrote for its newspaper, informing citizens of the soldiers' situations. She encouraged them to take initiative and support the troops in whatever way they could.

Taking her own advice to heart, Goddard travelled over 600 miles so she could aid the soldiers from Portland, Maine, who were a part of the 10th Maine Volunteer Infantry Regiment. She knew that there would be many wounded and dying men who would direly need her assistance. She had much sympathy for these soldiers, many of whom were living in miserable conditions if they were not wounded or killed. She helped gather donations for the soldiers and served as a volunteer female nurse along with many other civilian nurses and volunteers.

== See also ==
- Lowell Offering
- Lowell Mill Girls
- American Civil War nurses
- 10th Maine Volunteer Infantry Regiment
