= Lowell mill girls =

19th century Massachusetts textile workers

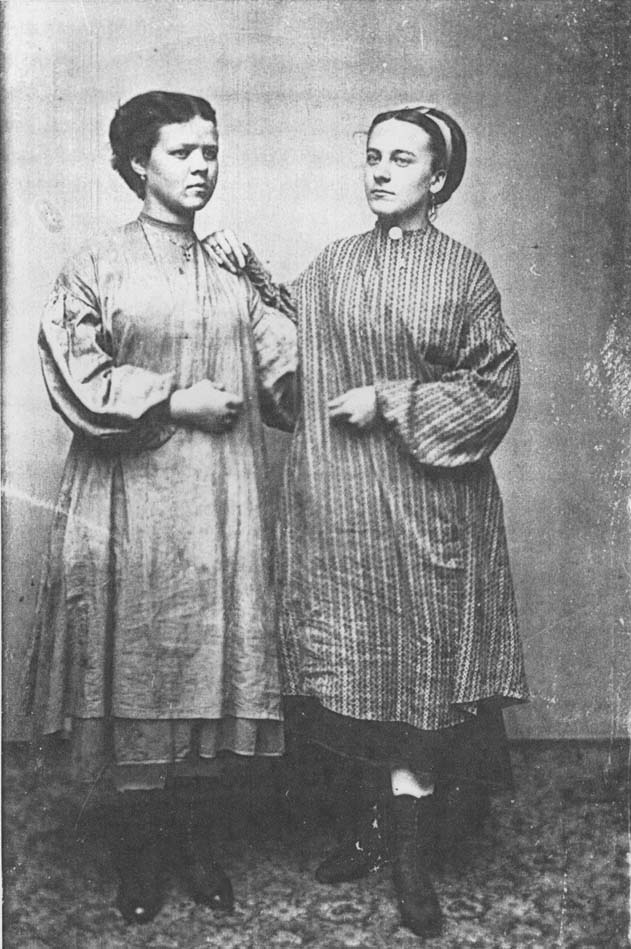
Tintype of two young women in Lowell, Massachusetts (c. 1870)

The Lowell mill girls were young female workers who came to work in textile mills in Lowell, Massachusetts during the Industrial Revolution in the United States. The workers initially recruited by the corporations were daughters of New England farmers, typically between the ages of 15 and 35. By 1840, at the height of the Textile Revolution, the Lowell textile mills had recruited over 8,000 workers, with women making up nearly three-quarters of the mill workforce.

During the early period, women came to the mills for various reasons: to help a brother pay for college, for the educational opportunities offered in Lowell, or to earn supplemental income for the family. Francis Cabot Lowell emphasized the importance of providing housing and a form of education to mirror the boarding schools that were emerging in the 19th century. He also wanted to provide an environment that sharply contrasted the poor conditions of the British mills notoriously portrayed by Dickens. Their wages were only half of what men were paid, yet many women were able to attain economic independence for the first time. The Lowell mill girls earned between three and four dollars per week. The cost of boarding ranged between seventy-five cents to $1.25, giving them the ability to acquire good clothes, books, and savings. The girls created book clubs and published journals such as the Lowell Offering, which provided a literary outlet with stories about life in the mills.

Yet through the Lowell Offering and other reports published around the time, it is demonstrated that the reality of working in the mills was not all rewarding. Though women gained economic independence, it came at various costs. The Lowell mill girls would work 12-14 hours a day in terrible conditions. The factories were dangerous and would put the girls' health in jeopardy. Along with the factories being unsafe, the girls' dormitories were crowded and unsanitary. While the factories had many dangerous aspects, it is hard to view them as completely negative. Along with giving girls the opportunities for financial freedom, it offered education. While working at the factories, education was available to them; they could attend lectures and had access to a library. While the Lowell mills provided new employment and educational opportunities for women, the working conditions were often harsh. When respected figures visited the mills, it was noted that the visitors were only presented with the nicely dressed operatives, while they did not gain a glimpse of the condition of most individuals working at the mills. Both the physical and mental state of workers were negatively impacted, representing the hidden dark realities of the mills. While the employers lived luxuriously, the workers faced an average working life of only three years. The Boston Quarterly Report of 1840 claims that workers were likely better off before beginning their labor at the mills than the condition that they developed during and after starting. Therefore, the poor conditions of those working the mills depict a contrasting mission that Francis Cabot Lowell claimed to pursue. Although he claimed to desire an improvement from the poor conditions of the British mills, he may not have achieved that. Though women particularly were searching for economic freedom, the belief that their quest ended at the Lowell Mills may be contested. There may have been greater economic freedom than before, but it came at the cost of low wages to increase the economic wealth of their employers.

Additionally, the women at the mills faced challenges regarding their new economic independence, as the low wages and great temptations to spend their little money kept them under bondage. The culture at the mills was often materialistic. With many shops enticing girls to purchase items and girls persuading each other, women at the mills still were not economically free. They continued to face many voices on how to spend their money. Employers already gave them low wages. With the expectations to quickly spend their money, women have many external voices determining what enters and exits their wallets. Consequently, women at the mills are not reaching the economic freedom that they may have at first sought out for.

Over time, adult women displaced child labor, which an increasing number of factory owners were disinclined to hire. As the "factory system" matured, however, many women joined the broader American labor movement to protest increasingly harsh working conditions. Labor historian Philip Foner observed that "they succeeded in raising serious questions about woman’s so-called ‘place’."

In 1845, after a number of protests and strikes, many operatives came together to form the Lowell Female Labor Reform Association, the first union of working women in the United States. The Association adopted a newspaper called the Voice of Industry, in which workers published sharp critiques of the new industrialism. The Voice stood in sharp contrast to other literary magazines published by female operatives.

== Industrialization of Lowell ==
In 1813, businessman Francis Cabot Lowell formed a company, the Boston Manufacturing Company, and built a textile mill next to the Charles River in Waltham, Massachusetts. Unlike the earlier Rhode Island System, where only carding and spinning were done in a factory while the weaving was often put out to neighboring farms to be done by hand, the Waltham mill was the first integrated mill in the United States, transforming raw cotton into cotton cloth in one building.

In 1821, Francis Cabot Lowell's business associates, looking to expand the Waltham textile operations, purchased land around the Pawtucket Falls on the Merrimack River in East Chelmsford. Incorporated as the Town of Lowell in 1826, by 1840, the textile mills employed almost 8,000 workers — mostly women between the ages of 15 and 35.

The "City of Spindles", as Lowell came to be known, quickly became the center of the Industrial Revolution in America. New, large scale machinery, which had come to dominate the production of cloth by 1840, was being rapidly developed in lockstep with the equally new ways of organizing workers for mass production. Together, these mutually reinforcing technological and social changes produced staggering increases: between 1840 and 1860, the number of spindles in use went from 2.25 million to almost 5.25 million; bales of cotton used from 300,000 to nearly 1 million, and the number of workers from 72,000 to nearly 122,000.

This tremendous growth translated directly into large profits for the textile corporations: between 1846 and 1850, for instance, the dividends of the Boston-based investors, the group of textile companies that founded Lowell, averaged 14% per year. Most corporations recorded similarly high profits during this period.

== Work and living environment ==
Contemporary observers thought that by the 1830s, the social position of the factory girls had been degraded considerably in France and England. In her autobiography, Harriet Hanson Robinson (who worked in the Lowell mills from 1834 to 1848) suggests that "It was to overcome this prejudice that such high wages had been offered to women that they might be induced to become mill girls, in spite of the opprobrium that still clung to this degrading occupation...." However, in letters written by Mary A. Paul, she states that "I expect to be paid about two dollars a week but it will be dearly earned .24" and spends a whole letter discussing the decrease in wages that happened in 1846.

=== Factory conditions ===
The Lowell System combined large-scale mechanization with an attempt to improve the stature of its female workforce and workers. A few girls who came with their mothers or older sisters were as young as ten years old, some were middle-aged, but the average age was about 24. The very young girls of ages 10–15 were often called "doffers" as they would take off the full bobbins and replace them, otherwise known as doffing. Usually hired for contracts of one year (the average stay was about four years), new employees were given assorted tasks as spare hands and paid a fixed daily wage while more experienced loom operators would be paid by the piece. They were paired with more experienced women, who trained them in the ways of the factory.

Conditions in the Lowell mills were severe and grueling by modern American labor standards. Employees worked long and brutal hours from 5:00 am until 7:00 pm, for an average of 73 hours per week. Even the young girls (or "doffers") were forced to work for an average of 14 hours, with breaks of only 30 minutes for breakfast and 45 minutes for lunch each day. Women worked under these conditions for roughly 8 to 10 months of the year. Each room usually had 80 women working at machines, with two male overseers managing the operation. The noise of the machines was described by one worker as "something frightful and infernal", and despite the heat they generated, windows were often kept closed during the summer to maintain optimal conditions for thread work. The air, meanwhile, was filled with particles of thread and cloth. The mill buildings had minimal safety regulations, allowing for unstable building structures, limited ventilation, hazardous machinery, and overcrowding of rooms, threatening the health and wellbeing of every employee. Women seeking independence were soon facing life-threatening working conditions.

Charles Dickens visited in 1842, and remarked favorably on the conditions: "I cannot recall or separate one young face that gave me a painful impression; not one young girl whom, assuming it to be a matter of necessity that she should gain her daily bread by the labour of her hands, I would have removed from those works if I had had the power." English social theorist Harriet Martineau visited in 1844 with Ralph Waldo Emerson, and her reflection echoed these affirmative sentiments: "I saw no signs of weariness among any of them. There they sat, row behind row...all wakeful and interested, all well-dressed and ladylike." However, there was concern among many workers that foreign visitors were being presented with a sanitized view of the mills, by textile corporations who were trading on the image of the 'literary operative' to mask the grim realities of factory life. "Very pretty picture," wrote an operative named Juliana in the Voice of Industry, responding to a rosy account of life and learning in the mills, "but we who work in the factory know the sober reality to be quite another thing altogether." The "sober reality" was twelve to fourteen hours of dreary, exhausting work, which many workers experienced as hostile to intellectual development.

=== Living quarters ===
The investors or factory owners built hundreds of boarding houses near the mills, where textile workers lived year-round. A curfew of 10:00 pm was common, and men were generally not allowed inside. About 26 women lived in each boarding house, with up to six sharing a bedroom. One worker described her quarters as "a small, comfortless, half-ventilated apartment containing some half a dozen occupants". Life in these boarding houses was typically strict. The houses were often run by widows who kept a close eye on the workers and made church attendance mandatory for all of the girls.

Trips away from the boarding house were uncommon; the Lowell girls worked and ate together. However, half-days and short paid vacations were possible due to the nature of the piece-work; one girl would work the machines of another in addition to her own such that no wages would be lost. These close quarters fostered community as well as resentment. Newcomers were mentored by older women in areas such as dress, speech, behavior, and the general ways of the community. The women became very close with one another due to the extensive time they spent together both during work and after work when they would engage in cultural activities, such as music and literature.

Workers often recruited their friends or relatives to the factories, creating a familial atmosphere among many of the rank and file. The Lowell girls were expected to attend church and demonstrate morals befitting proper society. The 1848 Handbook to Lowell noted that the company would "not employ anyone who is habitually absent from public worship on the Sabbath, or known to be guilty of immorality".

The boarding houses the Lowell mill girls lived in became communities that caused the girls to rally together. Close living quarters allowed the girls to share many experiences and form tight bonds. Living in such close proximity also allowed the girls to communicate and coordinate plans for strikes very effectively. The sense of unity from their living situation was very effective in helping these women fight for the rights they sought.

=== Working-class intellectual culture ===
As for many young women, the allure of Lowell was in the opportunities afforded for further study and learning. Most had already completed some measure of formal education and were resolutely bent on self-improvement. Upon their arrival, they found a lively working-class intellectual culture: workers read in Lowell's city library and reading rooms and subscribed to the large, informal "circulating libraries" which trafficked in novels. Many even pursued literary composition. Defying factory rules, operatives would affix verses to their spinning frames, "to train their memories", and pin up mathematical problems in the rooms where they worked. In the evenings, many enrolled in courses offered by the mills and attended public lectures at the Lyceum, a theatre built at company expense (offering 25 lectures per season for 25 cents). The Voice of Industry is alive with notices for upcoming lectures, courses, and meetings on topics ranging from astronomy to music. ("Lectures and Learning", Voice of Industry)

The corporations happily publicized the efforts of these "literary mill girls", boasting that they were the "most superior class of factory operative", impressing foreign visitors. But this masked the bitter opposition of many workers to the 12–14 hours of exhausting, monotonous work, which they saw was corrosive to their desire to learn. As one operative asked in the Voice, "who, after thirteen hours of steady application to monotonous work, can sit down and apply her mind to deep and long-continued thought?" Another Lowell operative expressed a similar view: "I well remember the chagrin I often felt when attending lectures, to find myself unable to keep awake...I am sure few possessed a more ardent desire for knowledge than I did, but such was the effect of the long hour system, that my chief delight was, after the evening meal, to place my aching feet in an easy position, and read a novel."

== The Lowell Offering ==
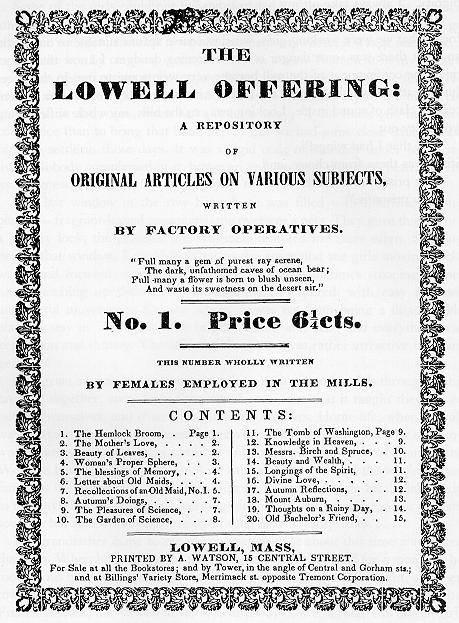
Cover of The Lowell Offering, Series 1, Number 1 (1840)

In October 1840, the Reverend Abel Charles Thomas of the First Universalist Church organized a monthly publication by and for the Lowell girls. As the magazine grew in popularity, women contributed poems, ballads, essays, and fiction – often using their characters to report on conditions and situations in their lives.

In 1841, the Lowell Offering published a piece called "Abby's Year in Lowell", which was supposed to exemplify the nature of the factories as a place of reform for young girls of a rebellious nature to learn the value of the dollar. This as it turns out was a propaganda piece at the time to promote the factory work. However, this did little in the way of curbing unrest and desires for reform of the system itself.

The "Offering"s contents were by turns serious and farcical. In a letter in the first issue, "A Letter about Old Maids", the author suggested that "sisters, spinsters, & lay-nuns" were an essential component of God's "wise design". Later issues – particularly in the wake of labor unrest in the factories – included an article about the value of organizing and an essay about suicide among the Lowell girls.

== Strikes of 1834 and 1836 ==
The initial effort of the investors and managers to recruit female textile workers brought generous wages for the time (three to five dollars per week), but with the economic depression of the early 1830s, the Board of Directors proposed a reduction in wages. This, in turn, led to organized "turn-outs" or strikes.

In February 1834, the Board of Directors of Lowell's textile mills requested a 12.5% wage reduction, to go into effect on March 1. After a series of meetings, the female textile workers organized a "turn-out". The women involved in the "turn-out" immediately withdrew their savings, causing a run on two local banks.

The strike failed, and within days the protesters had all returned to work (at reduced pay) or left town. Despite its failure, the "turn-out" was an indication of the determination of Lowell female textile workers to take labor action. This dismayed the agents of the factories, who portrayed it as a betrayal of the strikers' femininity. William Austin, an agent of the Lawrence Manufacturing Company, wrote to his Board of Directors, "notwithstanding the friendly and disinterested advice which has been on all proper occassions [sic] communicated to the girls of the Lawrence mills a spirit of evil omen ... has prevailed, and overcome the judgment and discretion of too many".

In response to a severe economic depression and the rising cost of living, in January 1836, the Board of Directors of Lowell's textile mills absorbed an increase in the textile workers' rent to assist in the crisis faced by the company in boarding housekeepers. As the economic calamity continued, in October 1836, the Directors proposed an additional rent hike to be paid by the textile workers living in the company boarding houses. The female textile workers responded immediately in protest by forming the Factory Girls' Association and organizing another "turn-out".

Harriet Hanson Robinson, an eleven-year-old doffer at the time of the strike, recalled in her memoirs: "One of the girls stood on a pump and gave vent to the feelings of her companions in a neat speech, declaring that it was their duty to resist all attempts at cutting down the wages. This was the first time a woman had spoken in public in Lowell, and the event caused surprise and consternation among her audience."

This "turn-out" attracted over 1,500 workers – nearly twice the number two years previously - causing Lowell's textile mills to run far below capacity. Unlike the 1834 "turn-out", in 1836, there was enormous community support for the striking female textile workers. The proposed rent hike was seen as a violation of the written contract between the employers and the employees. The "turn-out" persisted for several weeks, resulting in the Board of Directors rescinding the rent hike. Although the "turn-out" was a success, the weakness of the system was evident and worsened further in the Panic of 1837.

== Lowell Female Labor Reform Association ==
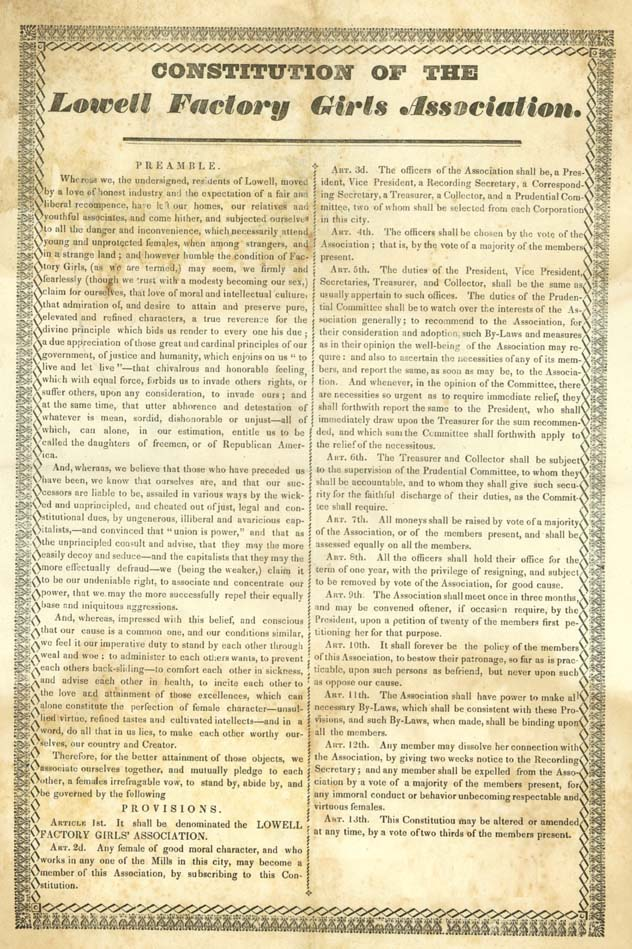
1836 Constitution of the Lowell Factory Girls Association

The sense of community that arose from working and living together contributed directly to the energy and growth of the first union of women workers, the Lowell Female Labor Reform Association. Started by 12 operatives in January 1845, its membership grew to 500 within six months and continued to expand rapidly. The Association was run completely by the women themselves: they elected their own officers and held their own meetings; they helped organize the city's female workers and set up branches in other mill towns. They organized fairs, parties, and social gatherings. Unlike many middle-class women activists, the operatives found considerable support from working-class men who welcomed them into their reform organizations and advocated for their treatment as equals.

One of its first actions was to send petitions signed by thousands of textile workers to the Massachusetts General Court demanding a ten-hour workday. In response, the Massachusetts Legislature established a committee chaired by William Schouler, Representative from Lowell, to investigate and hold public hearings, during which workers testified about conditions in the factories and the physical demands of their twelve-hour days. These were the first investigations into labor conditions by a governmental body in the United States. The 1845 Legislative Committee determined that it was not state legislature's responsibility to control the hours of work. The LFLRA called its chairman, William Schouler, a "tool" and worked to defeat him in his next campaign for the State Legislature. A complex election Schouler lost to another Whig candidate over the issue of railroads. The impact of working men [Democrats] and working women [non-voting] was very limited. The next year Schouler was re-elected to the State Legislature.

The Lowell female textile workers continued to petition the Massachusetts Legislature and legislative committee hearings became an annual event. Although the initial push for a ten-hour workday was unsuccessful, the LFLRA continued to grow, affiliating with the New England Workingmen's Association and publishing articles in that organization's Voice of Industry, a pro-labor newspaper. This direct pressure forced the Board of Directors of Lowell's textile mills to reduce the workday by 30 minutes in 1847. The FLRA's organizing efforts spilled over into other nearby towns. In 1847, New Hampshire became the first state to pass a law for a ten-hour workday, although there was no enforcement and workers were often requested to work longer days. By 1848, the LFLRA dissolved as a labor reform organization. Lowell textile workers continued to petition and pressure for improved working conditions, and in 1853, the Lowell corporations reduced the workday to eleven hours.

The New England textile industry was rapidly expanding in the 1850s and 1860s. Unable to recruit enough Yankee women to fill all the new jobs, to supplement the workforce textile managers turned to survivors of the Great Irish Famine who had recently immigrated to the United States in large numbers. During the Civil War, many of Lowell's cotton mills closed, unable to acquire bales of raw cotton from the South. After the war, the textile mills reopened, recruiting French Canadian men and women. Although large numbers of Irish and French Canadian immigrants moved to Lowell to work in the textile mills, Yankee women still dominated the workforce until the mid-1880s.

== Political character of labor activity ==
The Lowell girls' organizing efforts were notable not only for the "unfeminine" participation of women, but also for the political framework used to appeal to the public. Framing their struggle for shorter workdays and better pay as a matter of rights and personal dignity, they sought to place themselves in the larger context of the American Revolution. During the 1834 "turn-out" or strike – they warned that "the oppressing hand of avarice would enslave us," the women included a poem which read:

Let oppression shrug her shoulders,
And a haughty tyrant frown,
And little upstart Ignorance,
In mockery look down.
Yet I value not the feeble threats
Of Tories in disguise,
While the flag of Independence
O'er our noble nation flies.

In the 1836 strike, this theme returned in a protest song:

Oh! isn't it a pity, such a pretty girl as I
Should be sent to the factory to pine away and die?
Oh! I cannot be a slave, I will not be a slave,
For I'm so fond of liberty,
That I cannot be a slave.

The most striking example of this political overtone can be found in a series of tracts published by the Female Labor Reform Association entitled Factory Tracts. In the first of these, subtitled "Factory Life As It Is", the author proclaims "that our rights cannot be trampled upon with impunity; that we WILL not longer submit to that arbitrary power which has for the last ten years been so abundantly exercised over us."

This conceptualization of labor activity as philosophically linked with the American project in democracy has been instrumental for other labor organizing campaigns, as noted frequently by MIT professor and social critic Noam Chomsky, who has cited this extended quote from the Lowell mill girls on the topic of wage slavery:

When you sell your product, you retain your person. But when you sell your labour, you sell yourself, losing the rights of free men and becoming vassals of mammoth establishments of a monied aristocracy that threatens annihilation to anyone who questions their right to enslave and oppress. Those who work in the mills ought to own them, not have the status of machines ruled by private despots who are entrenching monarchic principles on democratic soil as they drive downwards freedom and rights, civilization, health, morals and intellectuality in the new commercial feudalism.

== Notable people ==
- Sarah Bagley
- Eliza Jane Cate
- Betsey Guppy Chamberlain
- Harriet Farley
- Margaret Foley
- Adelia Sarah Gates
- Abba Goddard
- Lucy Larcom
- Francis Cabot Lowell
- Harriet Hanson Robinson

== See also ==
- List of mill towns in Massachusetts
- Lowell mills
- Mill towns
- Waltham-Lowell system
