= Gilbrae Inn =

- U.S. National Register of Historic Places
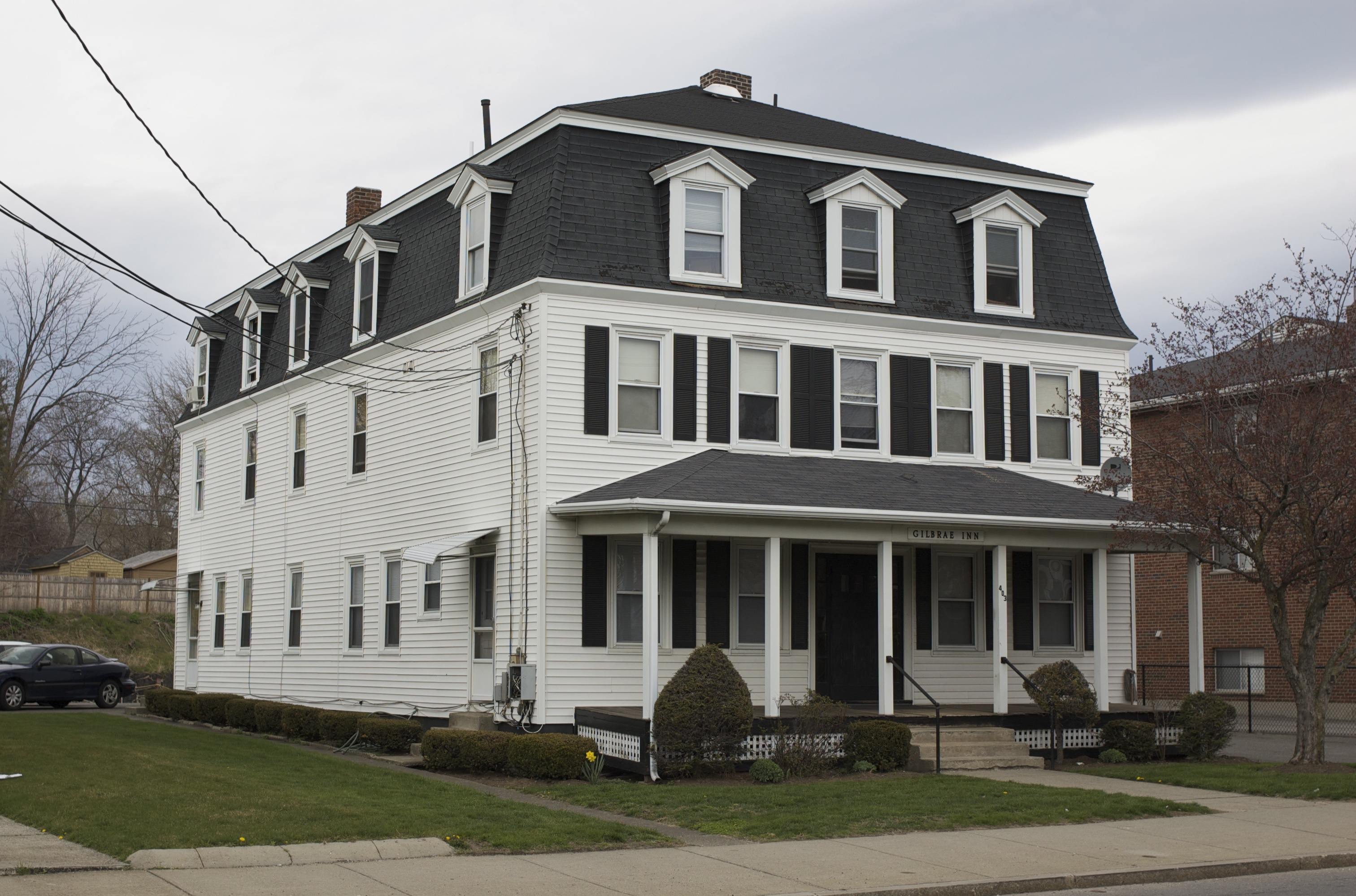

- Location within Massachusetts Location within the United States
- Location: 403 River St., Waltham, Massachusetts
- Coordinates: 42°22′26″N 71°13′58″W
- Architectural style: Greek Revival, Second Empire
- MPS: Waltham MRA
- NRHP reference No.: 89001550
- Added to NRHP: September 28, 1989

The Gilbrae Inn is a historic residential building in Waltham, Massachusetts. It was built as a two-story wood-frame structure by the Boston Manufacturing Company sometime between 1827 and 1854 as a boarding house for its workers. In c. 1870 the mansard roof and third floor were added. It is the only known surviving boarding house built by the company. Its name derives from a cloth pattern manufactured by the company.

The building was listed on the National Register of Historic Places in 1989.

== See also ==
- National Register of Historic Places listings in Waltham, Massachusetts
