= Betsey Guppy Chamberlain =

Textile mill worker and writer (1797–1886)

Betsey Chamberlain
- Born: Betsey Guppy; 1797; Brookfield, New Hampshire
- Died: 1886 (aged 88–89)
- Occupation: Author
- Known for: A Fire-Side Scene

Betsey Guppy Chamberlain (1797–1886) was a textile mill worker who wrote sketches and poetry that were published in The Lowell Offering. Her co-worker, Harriet Hanson Robinson claimed that Chamberlain "had inherited Indian blood" and some sources claim she was Native American; however, there is little identifiable evidence to support the claim. Some of her writing in the Lowell Offering protests the treatment of Native people by the U.S. government.

== Biography ==
=== Early life ===
According to some sources, Guppy was of mixed Flemish/English and Algonquian descent. Judith Ranta argues that Guppy's "Native ancestry almost certainly derives from a tribe of the Algonkian Confederacy," based on the specific geographic area where the family lived and the fact that "Guppy family oral tradition" claims that her paternal grandmother, "Sarah Loud Guppy, was an Abenaki woman." However, census records from 1830 through 1880 identify her as a "free white" female.

Betsey Guppy was born on 29 December 1797 in Brookfield, New Hampshire. She was the daughter of William Guppy and Comfort Meserve. During her early childhood, her family moved to Wolfeboro, New Hampshire. Her mother died in 1802 when she was four years old, and her father married a second wife—Sally Marden—the following year. Her father, William, was frequently involved in legal troubles as both plaintiff and defendant; between 1799 and 1828, he was involved in twenty-nine Superior Court cases, with charges against him including theft, burglary, and assault.

Betsey Guppy married Josiah Chamberlain in 1820, and had two children by him before he died in 1823. In 1828, she sued her father to recover her dower; her suit was successful, restoring a portion of her husband Josiah's land to her that her father had attempted to take away through a bequest in his will. Despite the legal success, she was still in financial trouble, and was forced to sell their small farm in Brookfield and travel to work in the mills, which paid decent wages for the time (considering the generally poor wages paid to women at the time), although the hours were long and working conditions often difficult.

=== Lowell ===
Betsey Chamberlain was recorded as joining the First Congregational Church in Lowell, Massachusetts in March 1831, and in April 1834 was married to Thomas Wright in that church. The marriage did not seem to have lasted, and Betsey Chamberlain did not use the name "Wright" in later years. According to Harriet Hanson Robinson, who worked with Guppy in the mills, "Mrs. Chamberlain was a widow, and came to Lowell with three children from some 'community' (probably the Shakers), where she had not been contented. She had inherited Indian blood, and was proud of it. She had long, straight black hair, and walked very erect, with great freedom of movement. One of her sons was afterwards connected with the New York Tribune."

While in Lowell, Betsey worked in the mills and as a boardinghouse keeper. Her sister, Harriet Guppy, also worked in Lowell. From 1840 to 1843 Betsey published sketches in the Lowell Offering (1840–1845) and from 1848 to 1850 she contributed pieces to the New England Offering (1847–1850). Chamberlain used several pseudonyms including "Betsey", "B.C.", "Jemima", and "Tabitha."

=== Later life ===
In 1843 Betsey Chamberlain and Charles Boutwell were married in Illinois. He was a widowed farmer with children of his own. Betsey joined Charles on his farm in Wayne Station, DuPage County, Illinois. She returned to Lowell in 1848 and then returned to Illinois in 1850. She had four husbands in total, dying at the age of eighty-eight.

== Work ==
Thirty-three prose works by Chamberlain were published in the Lowell Offering between 1840 and 1843, and five more in the New England Offering from 1848 to 1850. A few of her writings, such as the 1842 The Indian Pledge and A Fire-Side Scene, are among the earliest protests against the persecution of Native Peoples to be published by a woman identified by some as having a Native American background. The satirical A Fire-Side Scene is highly critical of the way the government was treating native people, implying that their actions were far from following Christian morality. Most of her published pieces are sketches of village life and legends told from a woman's viewpoint, in which she shows great powers of observation, bringing her characters vividly to life. Harriet Hanson Robinson said of her "Mrs. Chamberlain was the most original, the most prolific, and the most noted of all the early story-writers. Her writings were characterized, as Mr. Thomas says, 'by humorous incidents and sound common sense,' and is shown by her setting forth of certain utopian schemes of right living."

== See also ==
- Lowell Mill Girls
- Lowell Offering
- Timeline of Lowell, Massachusetts
