= Boston Manufacturing Company Housing =

- U.S. National Register of Historic Places
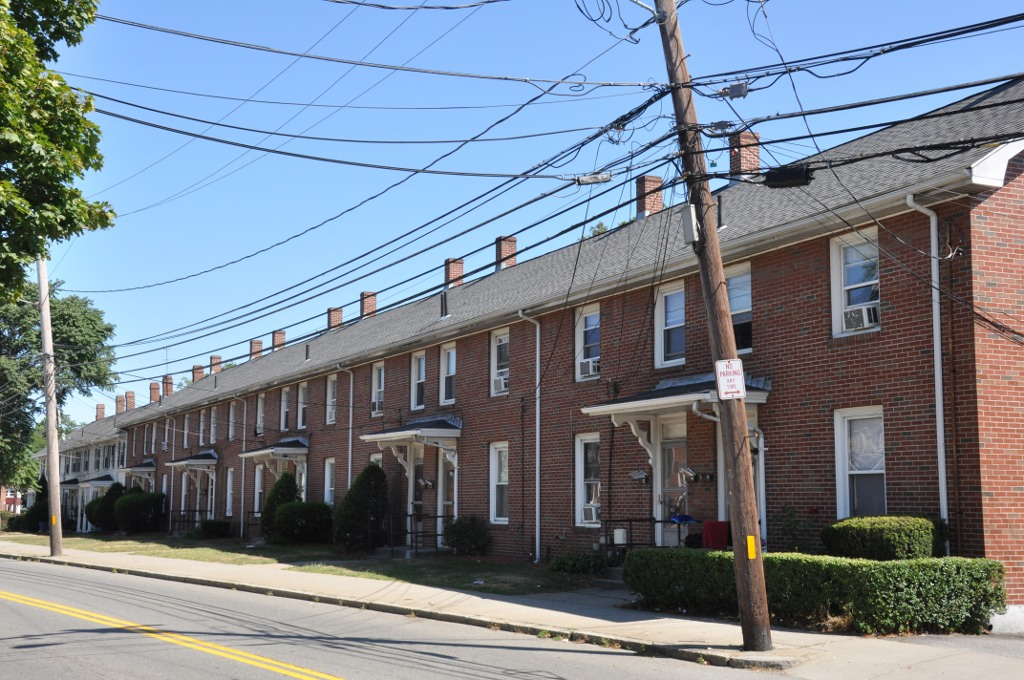
- 380–410 River St., 2010 photo

- Location within Massachusetts Location within the United States
- Location: 153–165 and 380–410 River St., Waltham, Massachusetts
- Coordinates: 42°22′25″N 71°13′55″W
- Architectural style: Italianate
- MPS: Waltham MRA
- NRHP reference No.: 89001534, 89001535
- Added to NRHP: September 28, 1989

Boston Manufacturing Company Housing are historic residential housing blocks at 380–410 and 153–165 River Street in Waltham, Massachusetts. The housing was for the Boston Manufacturing Company (BMC), the earliest modern manufacturing facility in the United States. The housing was built in the nineteenth century and the two blocks of buildings were separately added to the National Register of Historic Places in 1989.

== 153–155 and 163–165 River Street ==
These two buildings are located on the north side of River Street, between School Avenue and Willow Street a short way east of Waltham center. Both are 2 1/2-story brick buildings with mansard roofs providing a full third floor. They have symmetrical four-bay facades, with a pair of entrances in the center bays. Doors and windows are set in segmented-arch openings with brickwork hoods. The building at 163–165 retains the original slate of its mansard roof. These two buildings were built by the company in about 1870, probably for upper-level employees, and are a contrast to the wood-frame worker housing (now heavily altered) that stands behind them.

== 380–410 River Street ==
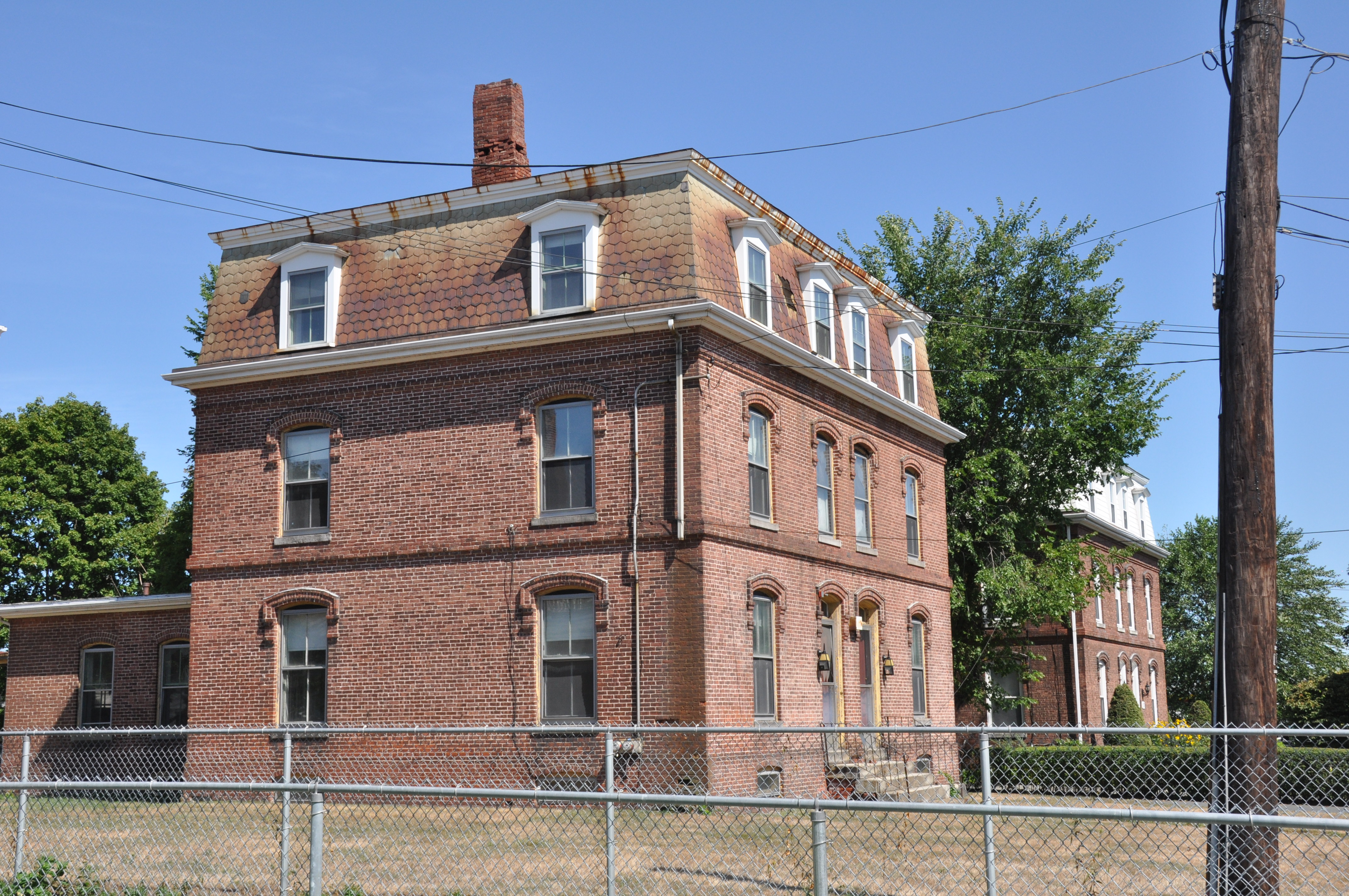
153–165 River St., 2010 photo

380–410 River Street consists of a pair of rowhouses located on the south side of River Street, between Jackson and Elm Streets. The eastern of them includes six units in a wood-frame structure, while the western one has ten units in a brick structure. Both are two stories in height, with gabled roofs. Entrances to the units are arranged in pairs, sheltered either by a hood supported by Italianate brackets, or by a portico supported by posts. These units were built by the BMC in the 1880s, as it expanded eastward. This type of housing was once quite common in the city, and these rowhouses are one of only two known groups to survive relatively intact (the others are on Lawton Place).

== See also ==
- National Register of Historic Places listings in Waltham, Massachusetts
