= Lowell Offering =

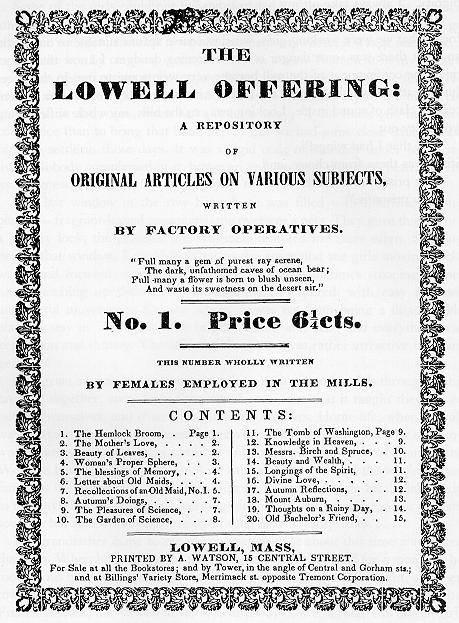
- Cover of the Lowell Offering, Series 1, No. 1
- Discipline: Literary journal
- Language: English
- Edited by: Harriot Curtis, Harriet Farley et al.

Publication details
- History: 1840–1845, succeeded by New England Offering
- Frequency: Monthly

Standard abbreviations
- ISO 4: Lowell Offer.

The Lowell Offering was a monthly periodical collected contributed works of poetry and fiction by the female textile workers (young women [age 15–35] known as the Lowell Mill Girls) of the Lowell, Massachusetts textile mills of the early American Industrial Revolution. It began in 1840 and lasted until 1845.

== History ==
The Offering was initially organized in 1840 by the Reverend Abel Charles Thomas (1807–1880) pastor of the Second Universalist Church. From October 1840 to March 1841, it consisted of articles from many of the local improvement circles or literary societies. Later, it became broader in scope and received more spontaneous contributions from Lowell's female textile workers. The Offering had hundreds of subscribers and supporters from throughout New England, United States, and among foreign visitors.

As its popularity grew, workers contributed poems, ballads, essays and fiction – often using their characters to report on conditions and situations in their lives. The contents of the magazine alternated between serious and farcical. In the first issue, "A Letter about Old Maids" suggested that "sisters, spinsters, lay-nuns, &c" were an essential component of God's "wise design". Later issues – particularly in the wake of labor unrest in the factories – included an article about the value of organizing and an essay about suicide among the Lowell girls. Among its contributors: Eliza G. Cate, Betsey Guppy Chamberlain, Abba Goddard, Lucy Larcom, Harriet Hanson Robinson, and Augusta Harvey Worthen.

Many women who worked in the mills, such as Ellen Collins, were unhappy with the conditions and hours they were forced to work. They did not like the constant noise and bells that they heard during their shifts, and often had the desire to return to their homes to work on farms rather than in the factories. With them having the desire to go back home, many women also missed their families and wished to go back to them as well.

However, the appeal of education and self-sufficiency drew many young women in, and they used the opportunities they received at the Lowell Mills to learn. They learned to read and write, as well as practicing music and foreign languages.

Harriet Farley, against her family and friends wishes, left Atkinson, New Hampshire in 1838 to work in Lowell's textile mills. In Lowell, although working 11 to 13 hours a day, and living in a crowded company boardinghouse, she felt a sense of freedom to “read, think and write…without restraint.” She was soon contributing articles to the newly formed Lowell Offering, and in 1842 along with Harriot F. Curtis became its co-editor. The magazine was revived in 1848 as the New England Offering (1848–1850), publishing contributions from working women throughout New England.

== Notable people ==
- Betsey Guppy Chamberlain
- Harriet Farley
- Lucy Larcom
- Harriet Hanson Robinson
- Augusta Harvey Worthen
- Sarah Bagley
- Abba Goddard
- Eliza Jane Cate
- Harriot F. Curtis

== Other uses ==
The University of Massachusetts Lowell currently uses the title for its student literary magazine as an homage.

== See also ==
- Lowell system
