= Lowell mills =

1814–1850 Massachusetts textile factories

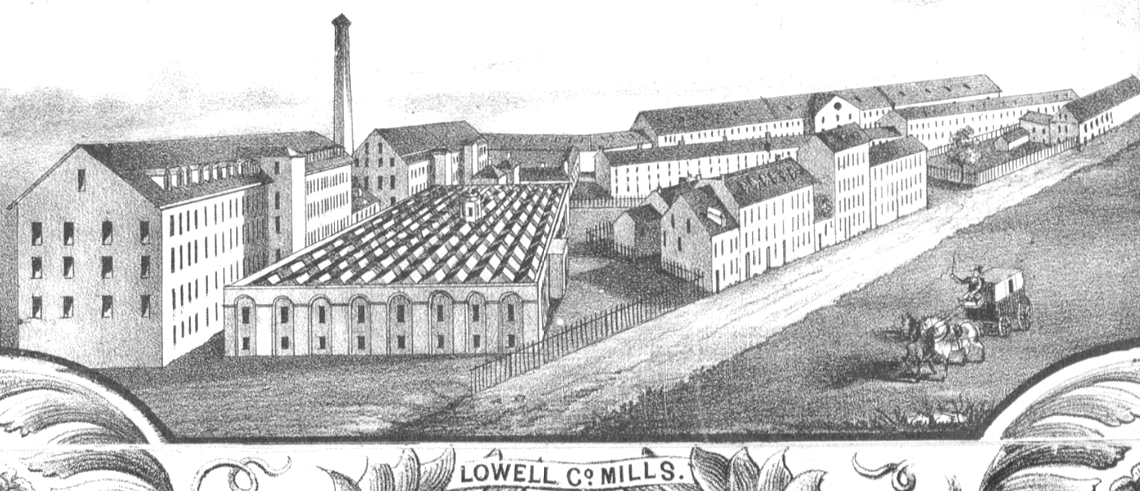
Detail from map showing Lowell mills in the 1850s

The Lowell Mills were 19th-century textile mills that operated in the city of Lowell, Massachusetts, which was named after Francis Cabot Lowell; he introduced a new manufacturing system called the "Lowell system", also known as the "Waltham-Lowell system".

== Philosophical context ==
Francis Cabot Lowell sought to create an efficient manufacturing process in the United States that was different than what he saw in Great Britain. His vision relied on his "great faith in the people of New England" and employees "would be housed and fed by the company and remain employed only a few years rather than form a permanently downtrodden underclass".

After a trip to London in 1811 during which he memorized the design of power looms, Lowell founded the Boston Manufacturing Company in 1813 along with Nathan Appleton, Patrick Tracy Jackson, and the other so-called "Boston Associates". This group of Boston-area merchants were "committed to the ideals of the original Protestant ethic and Republican simplicity" but were nevertheless "shrewd, far-sighted entrepreneurs who were quick to embrace...new investment opportunities". The Boston Manufacturing Company built its first mill next to the Charles River in Waltham, Massachusetts, in 1814. Unlike the prevailing system of textile manufacturing at the time—the "Rhode Island System" established by Samuel Slater—Lowell decided to hire young women (usually single) between the ages of 15 and 35, who became known as "mill girls". They were called "operatives" because they operated the looms and other machinery.

== The Lowell System ==
The Lowell system, also known as the Waltham-Lowell system, was "unprecedented and revolutionary for its time". Not only was it faster and more efficient, it was considered more humane than the textile industry in Great Britain by "paying in cash, hiring young adults instead of children, and by offering employment for only a few years and providing educational opportunities to help workers move on to better jobs".

For the first time in the United States, these mills combined the textile processes of spinning and weaving under one roof, essentially eliminating the "putting-out system" in favor of mass production of high-quality cloth. It completely revolutionized the textile industry and "eventually became the model for other manufacturing industries" in the United States of America.

=== Lowell mill girls ===
Lowell solved the problem of labor by employing young women (usually single) between the ages of 15 and 35, who became known as "mill girls". Unlike European industries, which had access to "large, landless, urban populations whose reliance on the wage system gave them few economic choices", American companies had to grapple with a small labor supply because the population was small and most preferred farming their own land and the economic independence that came with it. Additionally, many Americans viewed the European factory system as "inherently corrupt and abusive".

In order to persuade these young women to work at a mill, they were paid in cash once "every week or two weeks". Additionally, Lowell devised a factory community: women were required to live in company-owned dormitories adjacent to the mill that were run by older women chaperones called "matrons". In addition to working 80 hours a week, the women had to adhere to strict moral codes (enforced by the matrons) as well as attend religious services and educational classes. Despite being "highly discriminatory and paternalistic compared to modern standards, it was seen as revolutionary in its day".

Indeed, hiring women made good business sense; not only did women have experience weaving and spinning, they could be paid less than men, thereby increasing the profits of Lowell's Boston Manufacturing Company, and were "more easily controlled than men". Additionally, his tight rein on his employees "cultivated employee loyalty, kept wages low, and assured his stockholders accelerating profits".

In line with the Boston Associates' worldview, the mill girls were encouraged to educate themselves and pursue intellectual activities. They attended free lectures by Ralph Waldo Emerson and John Quincy Adams and read books they borrowed from circulating libraries. They were also encouraged to join “improvement circles” that promoted creative writing and public discussion.

== Decline ==
Economic instability in the 1830s as well as immigration greatly affected the Lowell mills in a negative effect.

Overproduction during the 1830s caused the price of finished cloth to drop and the mills' financial situation was exacerbated by a minor depression in 1834 and the Panic of 1837. In 1834, the mills cut wages by 25%, which led the girls to respond by staging an unsuccessful strike and organizing a labor union called the Factory Girls Association. In 1836, they went on another unsuccessful strike when their housing rates were increased. Conditions continued to deteriorate until 1845, when the Lowell mill girls formed the Female Labor Reform Association, which joined forces with other Massachusetts laborers to pass laws aimed at improving working conditions in the state, which the mills simply ignored.

The women responded by going out on strike and published magazines and newsletters like the Lowell Offering. They even petitioned the Massachusetts state legislature to pass a law limiting the workday to ten hours. The petition was unsuccessful but it showed mill owners that their employees had become too troublesome.

By the mid-1840s, a "new generation of mill managers was in charge", for whom "profits rather than people seemed their primary, even sole, concern".

Furthermore, mill owners, who were convinced that their employees had become too troublesome, found a new source of labor in the Irish immigrants who were flocking to Massachusetts in 1846 to escape Ireland's Great Famine. These immigrant workers were mostly women with large families who were willing to work longer for cheaper wages. They also often forced their children to work as well. This reliance on immigrant workers slowly turned the mills into what they were trying to avoid—a system that exploited the lower classes and made them permanently dependent on the low-paying mill jobs. By the 1850s, the Lowell system was considered a failed experiment and the mills began using more and more immigrant and child labor.

A textile mill in Lowell, Massachusetts, photographed by Jack Delano in January 1941.

In the 1890s, the South emerged as the center of U.S. textile manufacturing; not only was cotton grown locally in the South, it had fewer labor unions and heating costs were cheaper. By the mid-20th century, all of the New England textile mills, including the Lowell mills, had either closed or relocated to the south.

== Legacy ==
By 1840, Lowell, Massachusetts, had 32 textile factories and had become a bustling city. Between 1820 and 1840 the number of people who worked in manufacturing increased eightfold.

Although most of the original Lowell mill girls were laid off and replaced by immigrants by 1850, the grown, single women who had been used to earning their own money ended up using their education to become librarians, teachers, and social workers. In this manner, the system was seen as producing "benefits for the workers and the larger society".

== See also ==
- Boston Manufacturing Company
- Francis Cabot Lowell (businessman)
- Lowell, Massachusetts
- Waltham-Lowell system
- Lowell National Historical Park
