= Lawton Place Historic District =

Historic district in Massachusetts, United States

- U.S. National Register of Historic Places
- U.S. Historic district
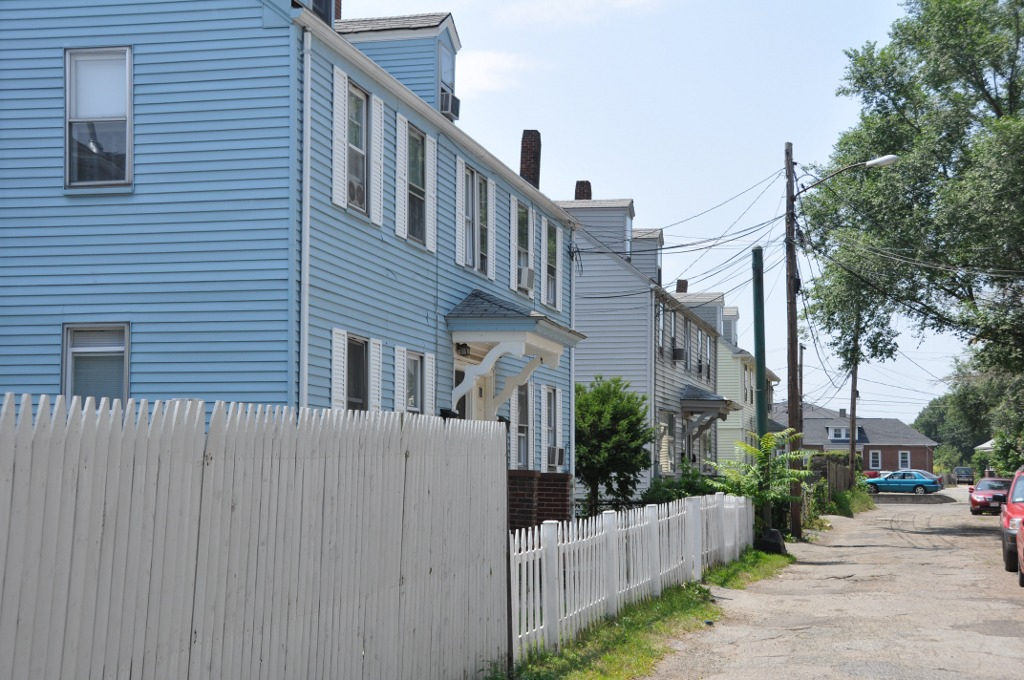
- View of the south side of Lawton Place

- Location within Massachusetts Location within the United States
- Location: Lawton Pl. between Amory Rd. and Jackson St., Waltham, Massachusetts
- Coordinates: 42°22′29″N 71°13′51″W
- Built: 1817
- Architectural style: Italianate, Federal
- MPS: Waltham MRA
- NRHP reference No.: 89001504
- Added to NRHP: September 28, 1989

The Lawton Place Historic District is a historic district on Lawton Place between Amory Road and Jackson Street in Waltham, Massachusetts. The district preserves some of the nation's oldest textile mill worker housing. The duplex houses located on the south side of Lawton Place were built c. 1815-17 by the Boston Manufacturing Company (BMC), the first mill to process textiles entirely under one roof. They were originally located at what is now the Waltham Common, and were moved to Lawton Place in 1889. On the north side stands a rowhouse that was built in 1889; it is the last instance of a type of row housing that was once commonly built for mill workers. The district was listed on the National Register of Historic Places in 1989.

== Description and history ==
Lawton Place is a short street between Jackson and Amory Streets, a short way east of the Waltham's Central Square. On the south side of Lawton Place stand three wood-frame two-family residences, all vernacular structures with interior brick chimneys and brick foundations. They have symmetrical six-bay facades, with a pair of entrances in the center bays, sheltered by bracketed hoods. Single-story ells extend to the rear of each unit. On the north side of the street stands a rowhouse containing 12 units. It is also 2-1/2 stories in height, with a brick foundation, and paired entries under bracketed hoods.

Lawton Place was laid out in 1889, as a place to accommodate housing units of the BMC which were moved during the creation of Central Square. The units were built in about 1817 by the company, which had been founded in 1813. The backs of these buildings originally faced the Boston and Fitchburg Railroad, just north of the BMC mill complex, and served as models for the construction of worker housing in Lowell. The rowhouse on the north side of Lawton Place was built in 1889, and was one of the BMC's last worker housing units to be built. The land on which these buildings stand was part of the estate of George Lawton, a BMC executive.

== See also ==
- National Register of Historic Places listings in Waltham, Massachusetts
