= Lucy Larcom =

American journalist (1824–1893)

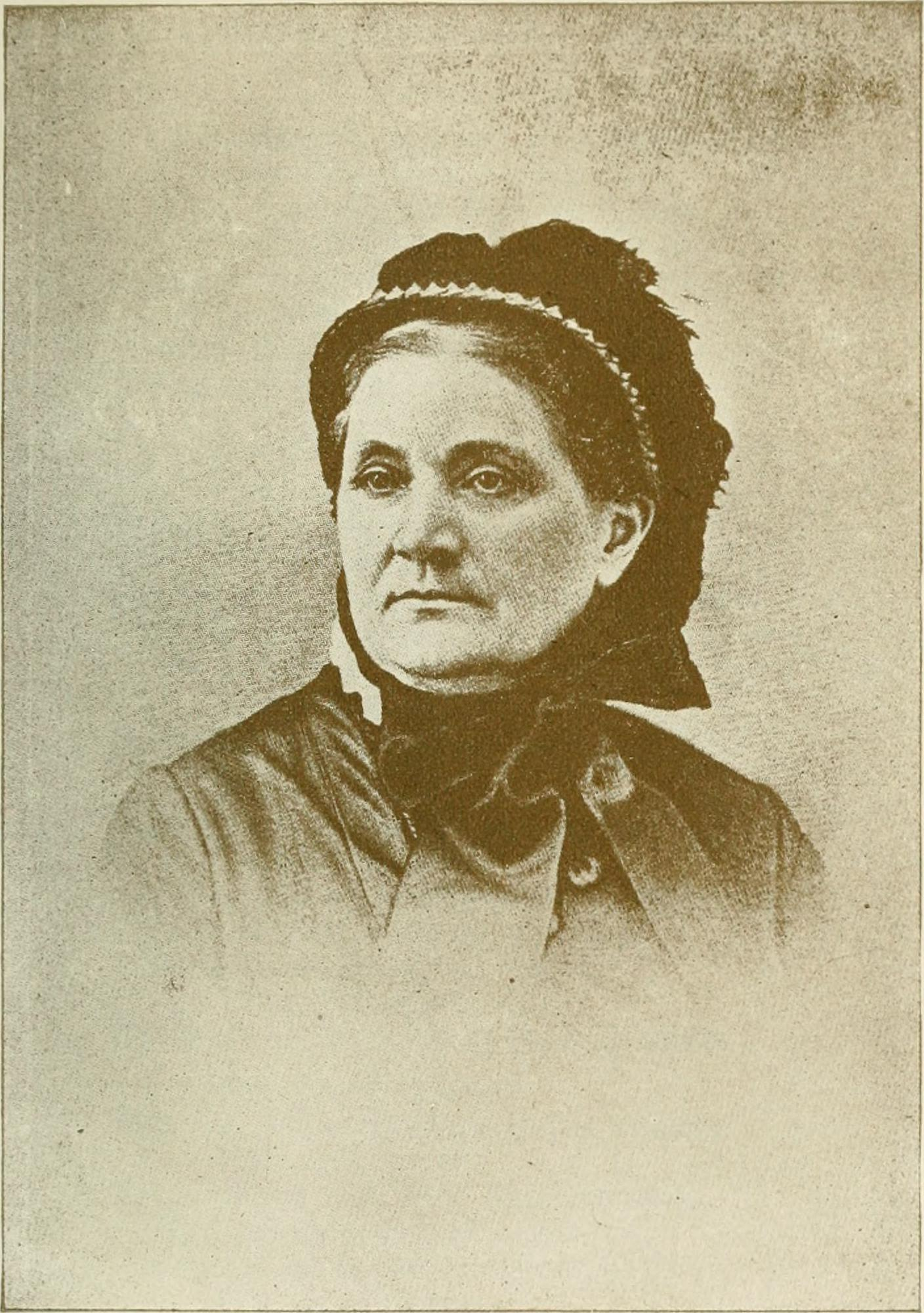
- Portrait of Larcom published in 1893
- Born: March 5, 1824; Beverly, Massachusetts, U.S.
- Died: April 17, 1893 (aged 69); Boston, Massachusetts, U.S.
- Resting place: Beverly, Massachusetts
- Education: Monticello Female Seminary
- Occupations: Teacher; poet; author
- Writing career
- Language: English

Lucy Larcom (March 5, 1824 – April 17, 1893) was an American teacher, poet, and author. She was one of the first teachers at Wheaton Female Seminary (now Wheaton College) in Norton, Massachusetts, teaching there from 1854 to 1862. During that time, she co-founded Rushlight Literary Magazine, a submission-based student literary magazine which is still published. From 1865 to 1873, she was the editor of the Boston-based Our Young Folks, which merged with St. Nicholas Magazine in 1874. (Note: Lucy Larcom was the editor of Our Young Folks from the first issue, Vol. 1, No. 1, Jan. 1865, to the last issue, Vol. 9, No. 12, Dec. 1873. John Townsend Trowbridge was co-editor from 1870 to 1873.) In 1889, Larcom published one of the best-known accounts of New England childhood of her time, A New England Girlhood, commonly used as a reference in studying antebellum American childhood; the autobiographical text covers the early years of her life in Beverly Farms and Lowell, Massachusetts.

Among her earlier and best-known poems are "Hannah Binding Shoes," and "The Rose Enthroned." Larcom's earliest contribution to the Atlantic Monthly, when the poet James Russell Lowell was its editor, a poem, that in the absence of signature, was attributed to Emerson by one reviewer. Also of note was "A Loyal Woman's No" which was a patriotic lyric and attracted considerable attention during the American Civil War. Larcom was inclined to write on religious themes, and made two volumes of compilations from the world's great religious thinkers, Breathings of the Better Life (Boston, 1866) and Beckonings (Boston. 1886). Her last two books, As it is in Heaven (Boston, 1891) and The Unseen Friend (Boston, 1892), embodied much of her own thought on matters concerning the spiritual life.

== Early years and education ==
Lucy Larcom was born in Beverly, Massachusetts, on March 5, 1824, to Lois and Benjamin Larcom. She was the ninth of ten children, eight of whom were daughters. According to her autobiography, A New England Girlhood, outlined from memory, Beverly was a small village at this time where she was able to play with neighbor children. She developed an early interest in reading and writing which she developed by reading children's fiction of the period. Titles included Alonzo and Melissa, The Children of the Abbey, and collective fairy tales. She borrowed books from the Sabbath-school library, including The Pilgrim's Progress. Other favorites from a circulating library included The Scottish Chiefs, Paul and Virginia, Gulliver's Travels, and The Arabian Nights. Again according to her autobiography, at the age of seven she wrote and self-published multiple collections of poetry. This period of her life ended when her father died in 1832, leaving her mother as a widow with ten children to raise.

Mr. Larcom's death coincided with the rise of the Industrial Revolution in Lowell. The Lowell Mills were hiring young women as factory workers and older women to run the boarding houses where the Lowell Mill Girls lived. Mrs. Larcom found employment as a boarding house supervisor while Lucy and her siblings found employment in the mills. While in Lowell, she helped her mother with household work in the intervals between her hours of school and work.

== Career ==
=== Lowell Mill Girl ===
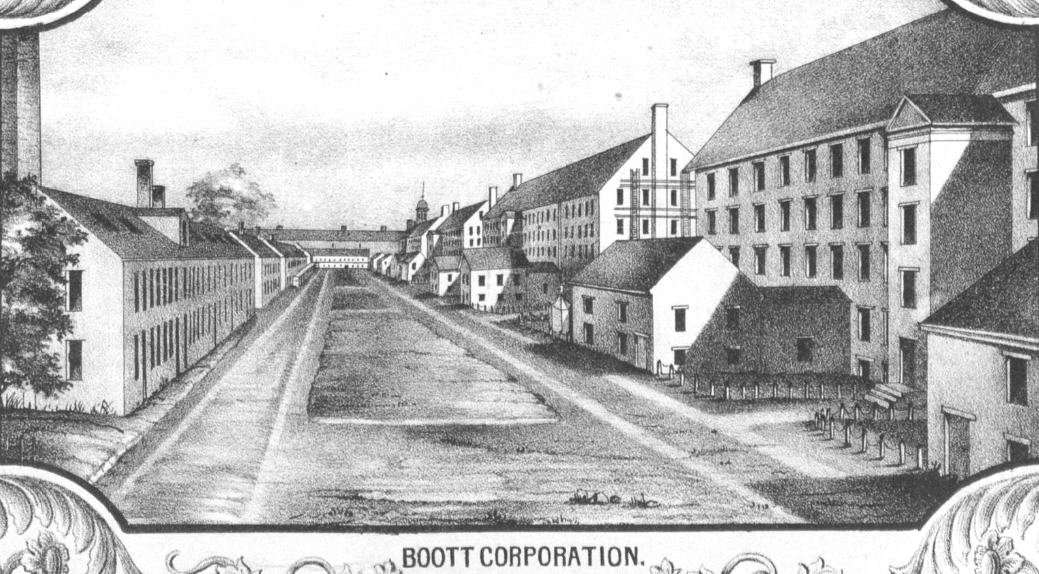
Boott Mills, ca. 1850

At age eleven, in 1835, she began working at Boott Mills, a cotton mill in Lowell, as a doffer, to earn extra money for her family. She was among the very youngest of those employed at the mills. Her first work as a Lowell operative was in a spinning-room, doffing and replacing the bobbins, after which she tended a spinning-frame and then a dressing-frame, while looking out windows towards the river. Later, she was employed in a "cloth-room," considered to be a more agreeable working-place because of its fewer hours of confinement, its cleanliness, and the absence of machinery. The last two years of her Lowell life, which covered in all a period of about ten years, were spent in that room, not in measuring cloth, but as bookkeeper, recording the number of pieces and bales. There, she pursued her studies during leisure moments, some textbooks in mathematics, grammar, English or German literature usually laying open on her desk.

Here, as in her earlier childhood, she put words to her visions through verses and by telling herself stories. Of those days, Larcom stated,— "While yet a child, I used to consider it special good fortune that my home was at Lowell. There was a frank friendliness and sincerity in the social atmosphere that wrought upon me unconsciously, and made the place pleasant to live in. People moved about their every-day duties with purpose and zest, and were genuinely interested in one another; while in the towns on the seaboard it sometimes was as if every man's house was his castle in almost a feudal sense, where the family shut themselves in, on the defensive against intruders." Still, she never lost her love and allegiance to the seaside area where she was born, while frequent visits kept up the charm, and gave her links to her home town. The ten years that Larcom spent at the mills made a huge impact on her. The Lowell Offering, a magazine whose editors and contributors were "female operatives in the Lowell mills," was published 1839–1845, and soon after it was launched Larcom became one of its corps of writers. One of her first poems was entitled "The River," and many of her verses and essays were found in its volumes. Some of those Lowell Offering essays appeared afterwards in Similitudes, her first published work.

It was at one of the meetings of the literary circle, established among the "mill girls", that Larcom first met the poet, John Greenleaf Whittier, who was then in Lowell editing a Free Soil journal. This was the start of a life-long friendship between the pair. Afterward, when she had come to know Whittier's sister, Elizabeth ("Lizzie"), the three spent time together. During sojourns at Salisbury Beach, near the respective homes at Amesbury and Beverly, in visits at Amesbury, in counsel and work together, out of which in recent time have grown the compilations of Child-life, and Songs of Three Centuries, their lives ran near together and contributed the one to the other.

=== Illinois ===
One after another, Larcom's sisters married out of the home, until only two remained. At about twenty years of age, Larcom accompanied the oldest of the Larcom sisters in Lowell, Emeline, to the then wild prairies of Illinois. Here, she shared in the efforts of a clergyman's household in pioneer times. A truly pioneer life was theirs as they moved many times from place to place, dependent upon who summoned the clergyman. Somewhere in this prairie Larcom taught school in a vacated log building to a 2 miles (3.2 km) neighborhood. Her students came from small colonies within this radius. It was in the corner of a big township which included three counties. She taught under the auspices of a district committee, before whom, previous to induction to office, the candidate was obliged to hold up her right hand and swear to acquaintance, sufficient to instruct from, with writing, spelling, arithmetic, and geography. Her salary was US$40 for three months; and once, when the time for payment arrived, and her brother-in-law visited the committee-man whose duty it was to make it, his reminder was met with the rather startled remark, as if the subject had never presented itself in so strong a light before:— "Forty dollars! Well, that's a lot o' money to pay a young woman for three months' teaching'! She oughta know considerable!" When the official was reassured by a statement of what Larcom's antecedents in study and achievement had been, he replied:— "Well, that's a good deal for her to ha' done!" before handing over the money.

During another sojourning, Larcom found herself in the neighborhood of an excellent young ladies' school. Switching from teacher to scholar, she spent three years at Monticello Female Seminary, following the full course of study. During the last two years, she took charge of the preparatory department of that institution.

=== Back to Beverly ===
Eventually, Larcom tired of life in the west, so she went back to Beverly, where, for a year or two, she taught a class of young ladies before accepting a position as teacher in Wheaton Female Seminary, at Norton. She remained there for six years, conducting classes in rhetoric, English literature, and composition, while sometimes adding history, mental and moral science, or botany. Larcom's health began after these few years to suffer from such a constant strain of teaching work that she had to relinquish regular employment, although, from time to time, she lectured upon literature, or taught classes in various young ladies' schools of Boston.

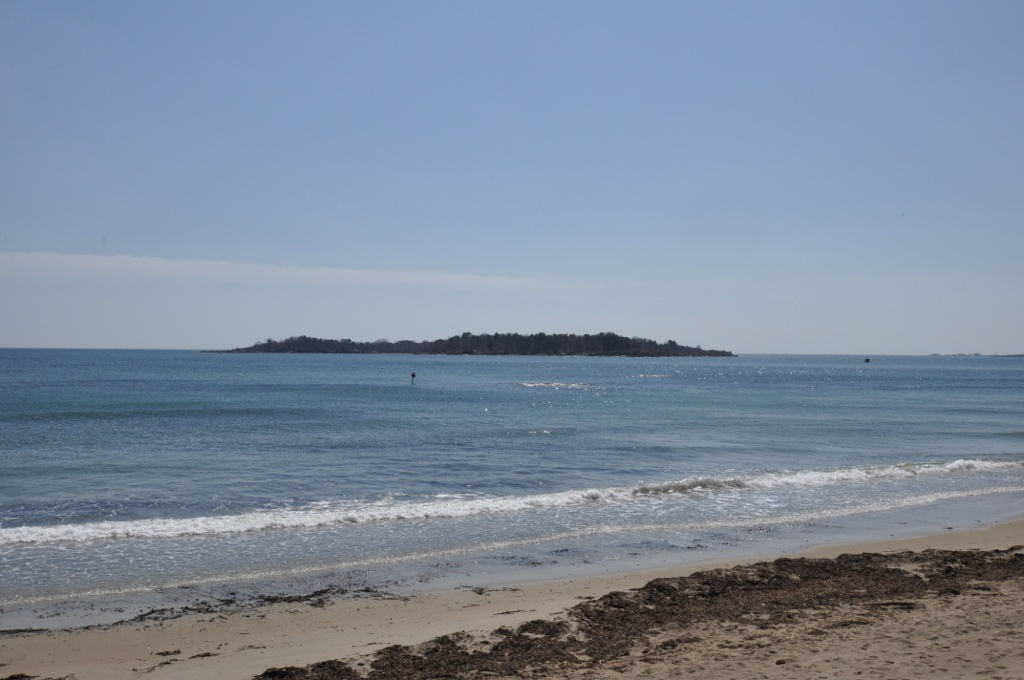
View from Beverly Farms

Her first poem in the Atlantic was "The Rose Enthroned" and it is remembered as her greatest inspiration. It was a parable-epic of creation with twenty-one four-line stanzas. Previously to this,— as far back as during her early residence in Illinois,— some poems were published with the name, and some slight sketch of the writer, in Griswold's Female Poets of America; and at about the same time, verses of hers were printed in Sartain's Magazine. During 1852–53, she wrote frequently for the National Era, of which Mr. Whittier was corresponding editor. Later, the Independent and the Boston Congregationalist, and various other magazines received and published her contributions. "Hannah Binding Shoes" appeared first in the New York Crayon; perhaps no single poem of hers was better known or more admired. When Our Young Folks magazine was started, Larcom became one of its assistant editors. Subsequently, for a year or two, she was the leading editor. For the next seven years, she lived quietly and independently at Beverly Farms.

In the spirit of ministry, she gathered together the compilation of Breathings of a Better Life. Roadside Poems, and Hillside and Seaside, were compilations from readings of nature. Childlife, Childlife in Prose, and Songs of Three Centuries, were pulled together in company with Whittier, and which he edited. The volume, Wild Roses of Cape Ann came after these.

Larcom served as a model for the change in women's roles in society. She was a friend of Harriet Hanson Robinson, who worked in the Lowell mills at the same time. Robinson also became a poet and author; later, she was prominent in the women's suffrage movement. Both contributed to the literary magazine Lowell Offering. (Note: List of contributors to Lowell Offering, compiled in 1902.)

== Death and legacy ==
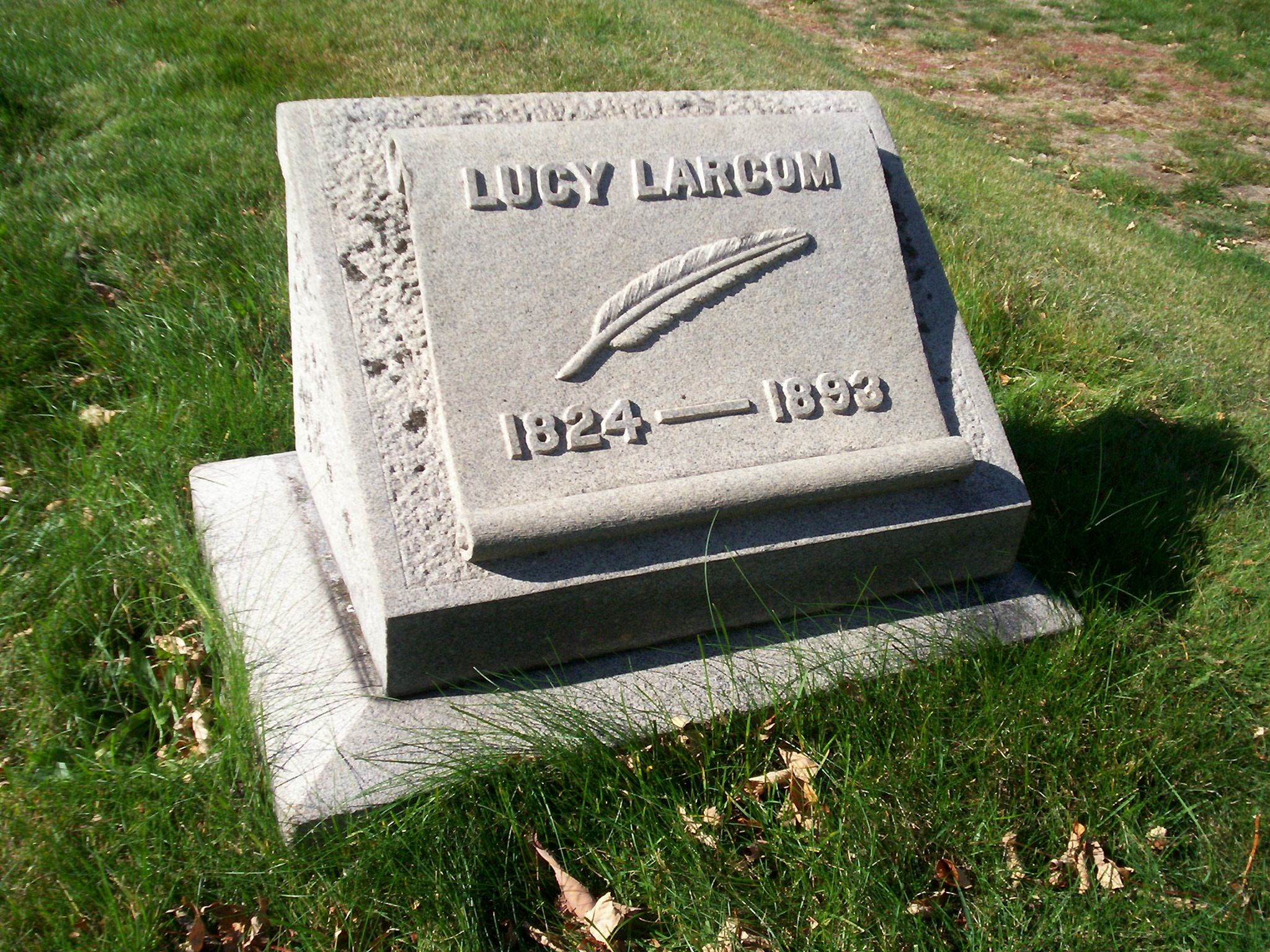
Headstone

Larcom died at age 69 on April 17, 1893, in Boston and was buried in her hometown of Beverly, Massachusetts. Her influence is still felt in Beverly. A local literary magazine entitled The Larcom Review is named for her, as is the library at the Beverly High School. A theatre built in Beverly in 1912 was named the Larcom Theatre Music and Performing Arts after Larcom as well.

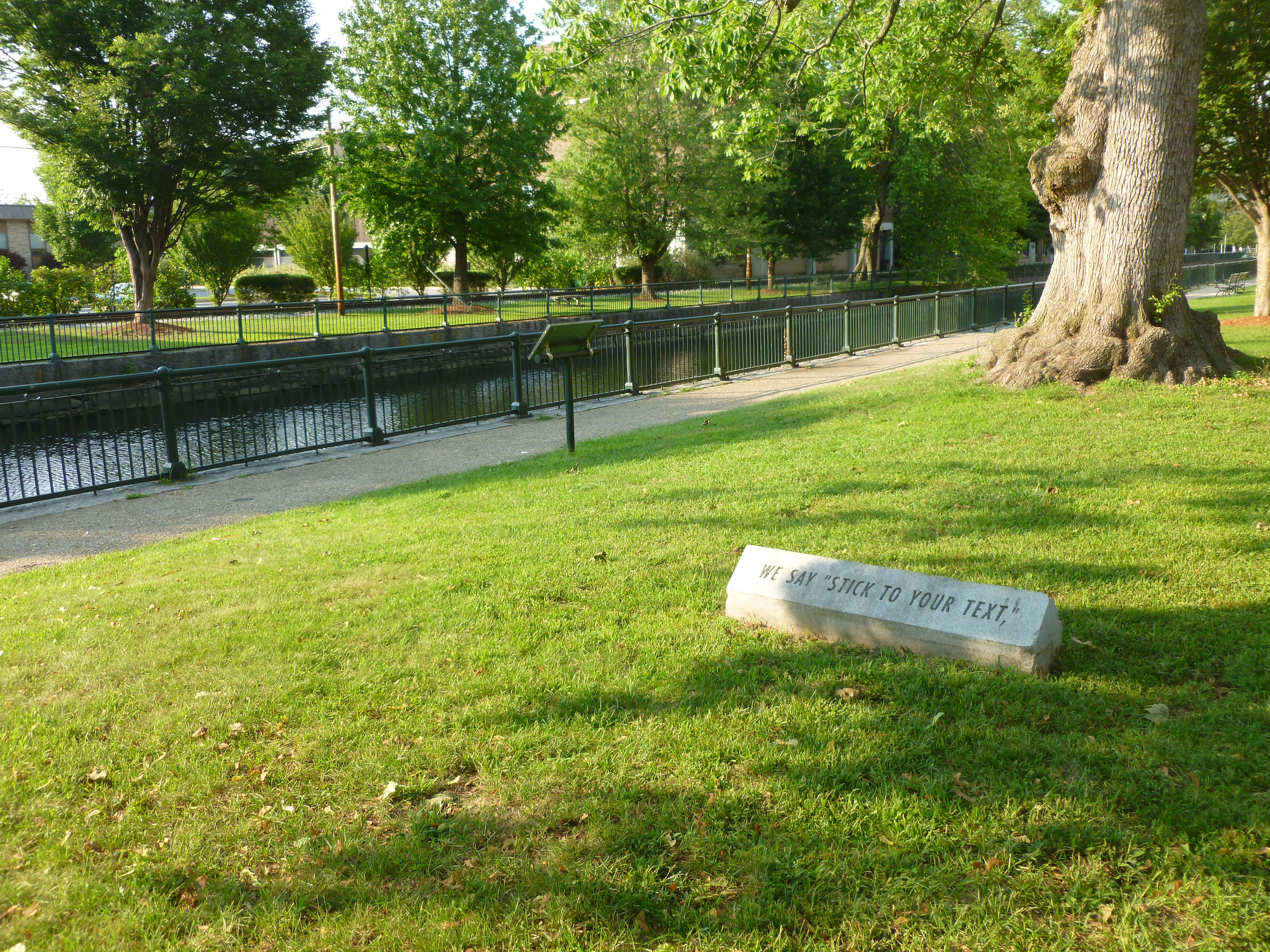
Lucy Larcom Park

Larcom Mountain, located in the Ossipee Mountains in New Hampshire, is named after her, as she frequented the area during the late 1800s. At Wheaton College in Norton, Massachusetts, the Larcom Dormitory is named after her. Rushlight Literary Magazine, which she founded, is still in publication today. Larcom's legacy is honored in Lowell, Massachusetts, where she worked as a "mill girl" at the Boott Mills, and as such, the Lucy Larcom Park was named after her to honor her works of literature that recounted her life at the mills. The park is located between the two Lowell High School buildings, and excerpts from her writings can be found on monuments, statues and other works of art throughout the park.

== Style and themes ==
Larcom's later writings, assumed a deeply religious tone, in which the faith of her whole life found complete expression. In retrospection, she wrote Idyl of Work. Notwithstanding the fact that she really meant to set forth the image she had in her mind of her own elder sister, she unconsciously gave herself also, perhaps, through family likeness, in some touches of her portrayal of "Esther" in the Idyl. In her Idyl of Work and also in A New England Girlhood, Larcom described her early life. In the Idyl, the mill-life of forty or fifty years earlier was portrayed.

== Selected works ==
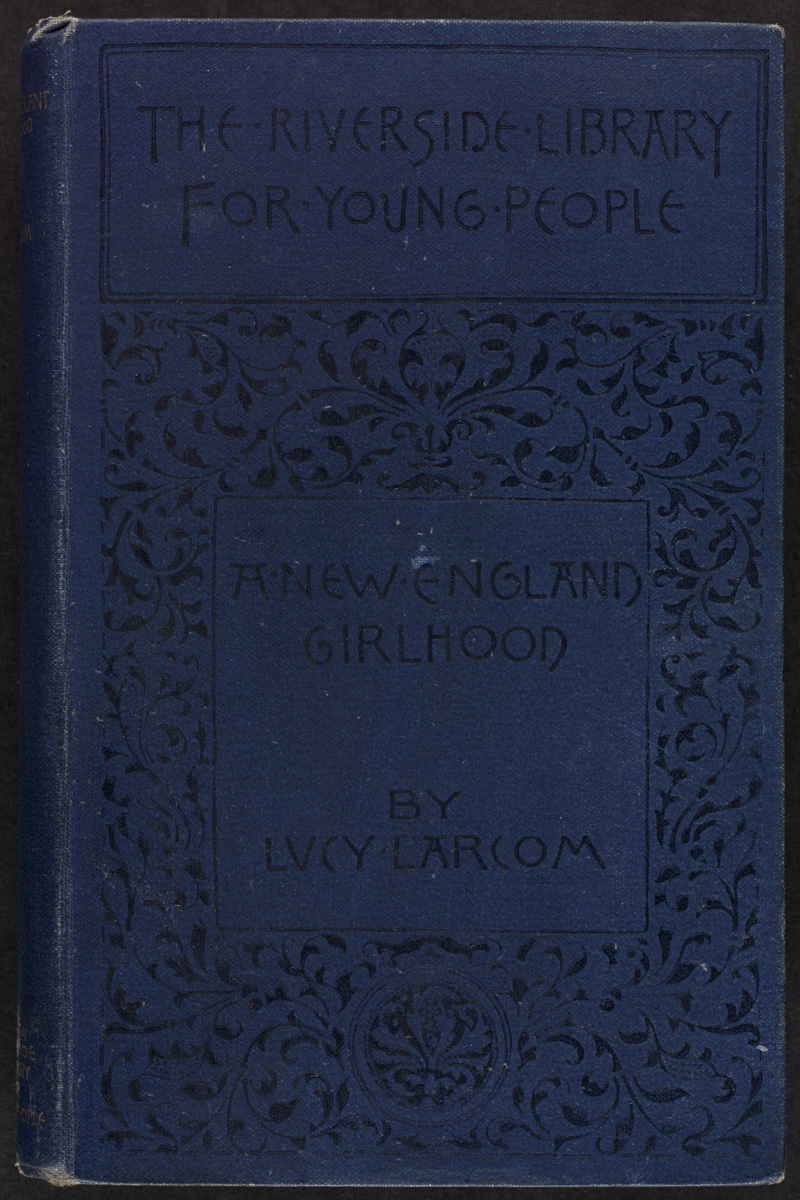
A New England Girlhood, 1889

- An Idyll of Work (1875)
- "Among Lowell Mill-Girls: A Reminiscence", Atlantic Monthly (November 1881)
- Wheaton Seminary; A Semi-Centennial Sketch, Cambridge. Riverside Press (1885)
- A New England Girlhood (1889)
- As It Is in Heaven (1893)
- "Landscape in American Poetry." New York. Appleton and Company,(1879)
