= Harriet Farley =

American writer, abolitionist, journalist, editor

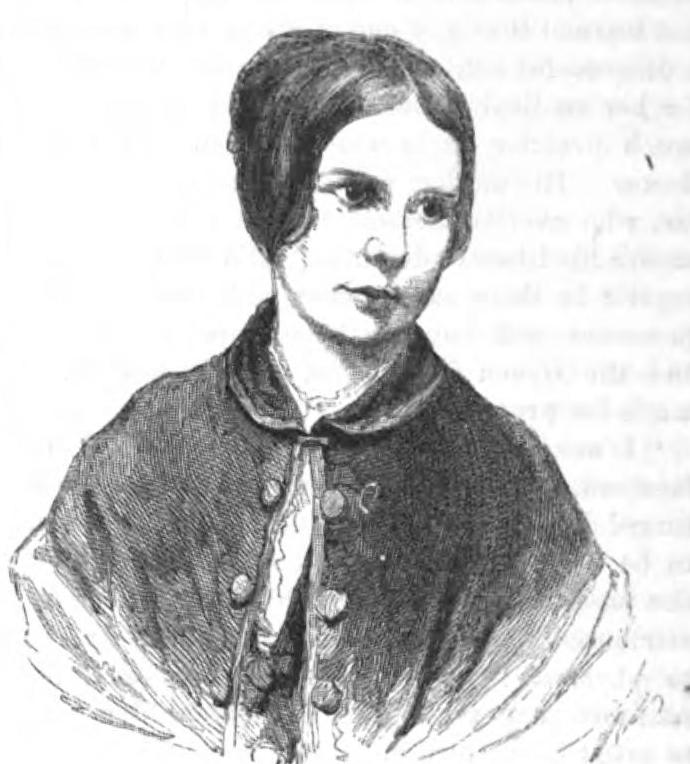
- Born: February 18, 1812; Claremont, New Hampshire, U.S.
- Died: November 12, 1907 (aged 95); New York City New York, U.S.
- Occupation: Writer
- Spouse: John Intaglio Donlevy (m. 1854)

Harriet Jane Farley (February 18, 1812, Claremont, New Hampshire – November 12, 1907, New York City, New York) was an American writer and abolitionist, editor of the Lowell Offering from 1842–1845, and editor of the New England Offering from 1847–1850.

== Early life and education ==
Harriet Farley was the sixth of ten children born to Reverend Stephen and Lucy Farley. She grew up in Atkinson, New Hampshire and attended Atkinson Academy, a school for both boys and girls, of which her father was the principal.

== Career ==
The Farleys were extremely poor, so at the age of fourteen, Harriet began doing piecework to earn money for her family. She was also a schoolteacher for several years, although she found that teaching was not to her liking.

In 1837, at the age of 25, Harriet left New Hampshire to work in the textile mills of Lowell, Massachusetts. There were high literacy rates among the young female workers of the Lowell mills, and many, like Harriet Farley, had been schoolteachers before entering factory work. It was common for these women to form writing groups, and out of one of these grew a magazine called The Lowell Offering in 1840.

Farley wrote articles and editorials for The Lowell Offering under a myriad of pseudonyms and eventually became editor in 1842; in 1843, Harriot Curtis, a fellow mill worker, became her co-editor.

Since the magazine was written by and for the mill girls, it was received with both criticism and interest by the general public. Some, including labor organizer Orestes Brownson, felt that the publication did not place enough emphasis on labor reform and the deplorable working conditions of the mills. Farley defended herself in a letter of response to his condemnation, insisting that the Offering was solely a literary magazine and had never been intended to be a political commentary.

Despite these criticisms, the material published in The Lowell Offering had widespread distribution. In 1844, an anthology of pieces from the magazine was published in Great Britain, even attracting the attention of Charles Dickens. As mill work was still a fairly new practice at this time, the Offering found a large audience abroad, especially in Europe, because it provided insight into the daily lives of mill workers.

Though she was determined to keep reform out of her publication, Farley was involved in one of the most prominent political movements of the time. In 1843, she joined the Massachusetts Anti-Slavery Society and soon became an influential abolitionist leader in Lowell. As part of the society, Farley helped raise money and awareness for the cause of abolitionism.

The Lowell Offering ceased publication in December, 1845 when protests about working conditions increased, and the magazine began to seem too conservative for its audience. Harriet's own popularity had declined, as well, largely due to her defenses of factory management and her repeated claims that factory life was not unjust. From 1847 to 1850, the magazine was revived, with Farley as editor and publisher, as the New England Offering. This short-lived publication focused more on labor reform than The Lowell Offering had.

After moving to New York City, Farley went on to write for the women's magazine Godey's Lady's Book, edited by her friend Sarah J. Hale. Farley's journalistic work was collected in two volumes in the late 1840s, and she also published a children's novel called Happy Nights at Hazel Nook in 1852. Additionally, she published Shells from the Strand of the Sea of Genius, a book of homilies, and edited her father's book on theology.

=== Writer ===
After working as a weaver in Lowell textile mills, Farley began contributing to the Lowell Offering. The Lowell Offering was a monthly magazine that was thirty-two pages long. It ran to five volumes, published from 1840 to 1845 with over fifty women contributors. The Lowell Offering emerged from a working women's writing circle held at the Second Universalist Church. Through publishing poetry, articles, and personal essays, this magazine provided an opportunity to share the writing of working women in Lowell textile mills. Working together on contributing to the “Lowell Offering” was one of the ways that women could continue their education while working in the mills. The Lowell Offering wanted to show that working women could be intellectuals. This image went against what European social reforms and union supporters thought of the mills. As the publication grew, it became something in which the contributors took great pride. The Offering was applauded by many famous authors such as, Charles Dickens, Anthony Trollope, and George Sand. The Lowell Offering briefly discontinued in 1845.

In 1847, Farley reissued the Lowell Offering under the name New England Offering, reaching out to a wider range of female contributors. In April 1848, she became its publisher, proprietor, and traveling agent. Farley hoped the “New England Offering” would have the same popularity as the “Lowell Offering”. Unfortunately the “New England Offering” did not repeat the success of its predecessor. The “New England Offering” lasted for two more issues. The New England Offering, like the Lowell Offering, was a venue where working women could share their writings. In both publication, Farley provided for the first time in history literary venues where working women could publish poetry, articles, and personal stories under a high standard of literary review.

== Personal life ==
In 1854, Harriet married John Intaglio Donlevy, a New York engraver and inventor. During the next two decades she stopped publishing and raised four step-children, 3 boys and 1 girl, 1 daughter, Inez DeCourcy Donley. After her husband's death, she published a Christmas book, Fancy's Frolics, in 1880. Harriet Farley died in New York City in 1907, at the age of 95.

== Selected works ==
- Shells from the Strand of the Sea of Genius, 1847
- Mind Among the Spindles, 1849
- Happy Nights at Hazel Nook, 1852
- Fancy's Frolics, 1880
