= Boston Manufacturing Company =

- U.S. National Register of Historic Places
- U.S. National Historic Landmark District
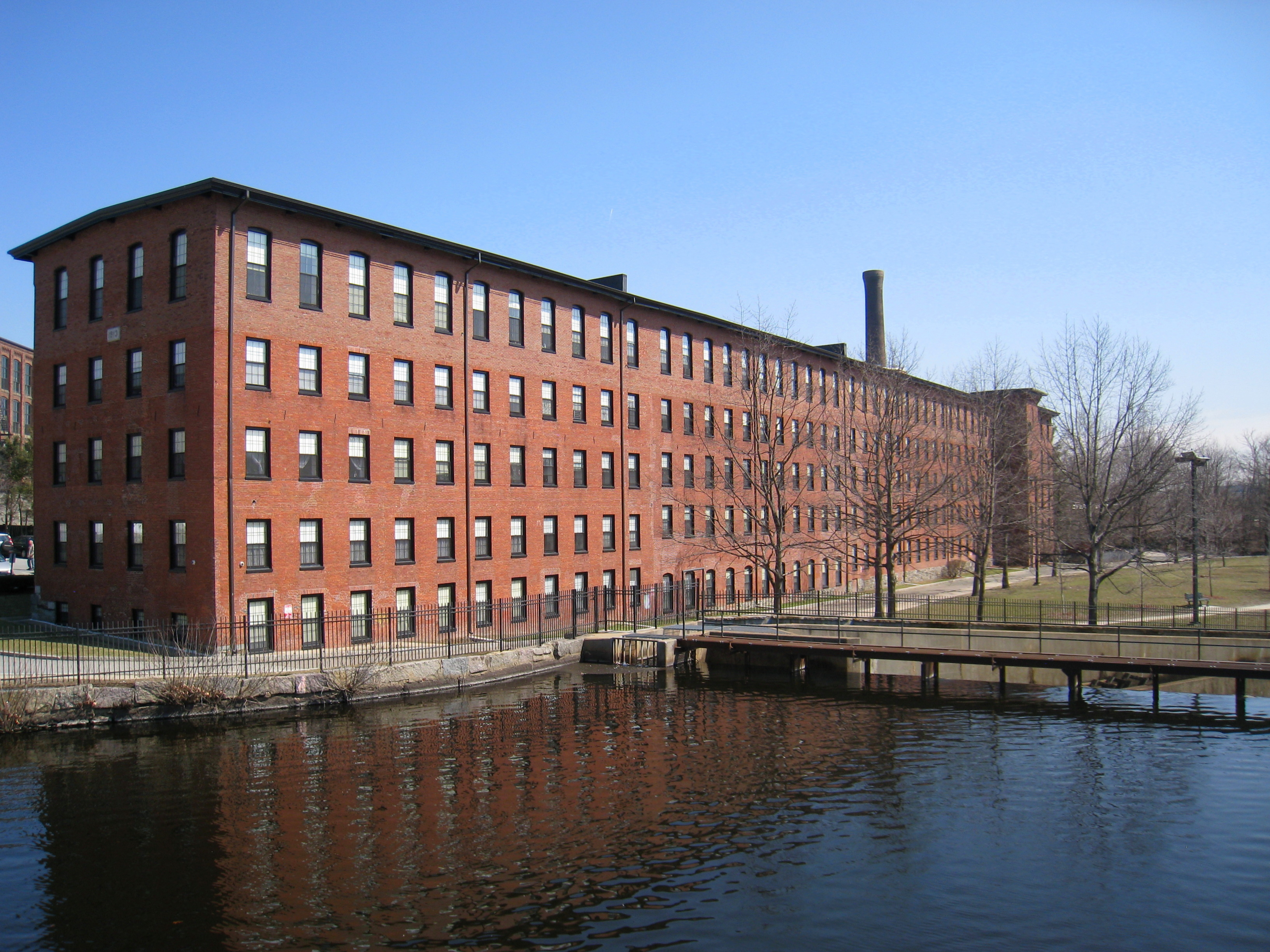
- Boston Manufacturing Company, Waltham, Massachusetts

- Location within Massachusetts Location within the United States
- Location: 144-190 Moody St., Waltham, Massachusetts
- Coordinates: 42°22′23″N 71°14′9″W
- Built: 1813
- Architect: Paul Moody
- NRHP reference No.: 77001412

Significant dates
- Added to NRHP: December 22, 1977
- Designated NHLD: December 22, 1977

The Boston Manufacturing Company was a business that operated one of the first factories in America. It was organized in 1813 by Francis Cabot Lowell, a wealthy Boston merchant, in partnership with a group of investors later known as The Boston Associates, for the manufacture of cotton textiles. It built the first integrated spinning and weaving factory in the world at Waltham, Massachusetts, using water power. They used plans for a power loom that he smuggled out of England as well as trade secrets from the earlier horse-powered Beverly Cotton Manufactory, of Beverly, Massachusetts, of 1788. This was the largest factory in the U.S., with a workforce of about 300. It was a very efficient, highly profitable mill that, with the aid of the Tariff of 1816, competed effectively with British textiles at a time when many smaller operations were being forced out of business. While the Rhode Island System that followed was famously employed by Samuel Slater, the Boston Associates improved upon it with the "Waltham System". The idea was successfully copied at Lowell, Massachusetts, and elsewhere in New England. Many rural towns now had their own textile mills.

== Origins ==
Since 1793, when Samuel Slater established the first water-powered successful textile spinning mill in the United States at Pawtucket, Rhode Island, water power had been operating machinery to process cotton fiber into yarn, which would then be outsourced to small weaving shops and private homes where it would be woven into cloth on hand-operated looms. By 1810, dozens of spinning mills dotted the New England countryside. However, cloth production was still fairly slow with this system.

While on a visit to Lancashire, England, in 1810, Francis Cabot Lowell studied the workings of the successful British textile industry. He paid particular attention to the power loom, a device for which there was yet no equal in America. He knew that increased cloth production in the United States depended on such a machine. Upon his return trip to Boston in 1812, he committed the plans to memory, disguising himself as a country farmer, since the British banned export of the new technology at the time.

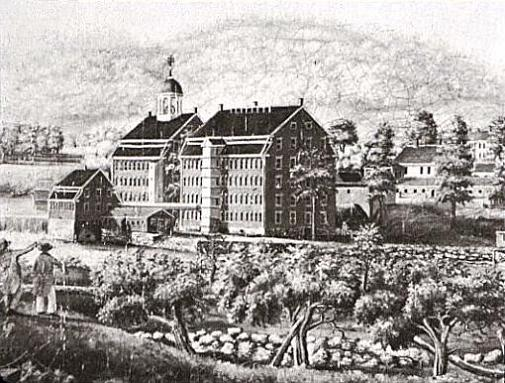
Boston Manufacturing Company, c. 1813

In September 1813, The Boston Associates purchased the Boies Paper Mill site in Waltham. With a ten-foot drop in the nearby Charles River, it was an ideal location to establish the new factory they envisioned.

== Revolution ==
The group hired a skilled mechanic named Paul Moody of Amesbury to develop and construct the machinery and to supervise the construction of the new mill.

After over a year of trials, Moody was able to bring Lowell's description of the power loom to fruition, making his own advancements along the way. It would be the perfection of Moody's power loom that would be the real "revolution" in American industry. For the first time, all phases of cloth production could be brought under one roof. Moody also developed a system of power transmission using a series of leather belts and pulleys powered by water turbines, that would prove much more efficient than the shaft and gear system then in use. The first mill was completed in late 1814, after almost a year of construction. Jacob Perkins was in charge of installing the first waterwheel, dam, flumes and raceway.

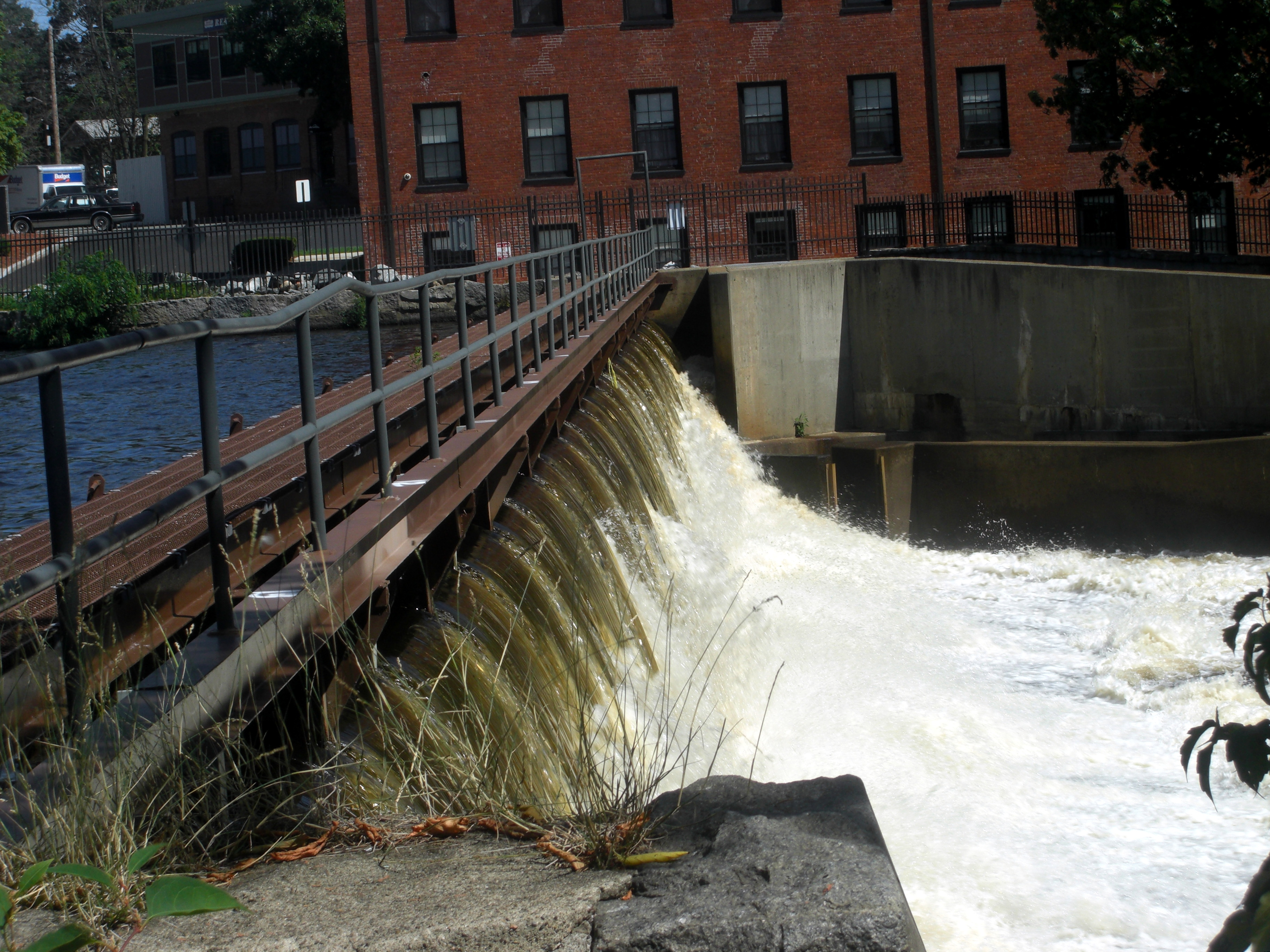
Boston Manufacturing Company and Dam in August, 2011

By early 1815, the cloth was sold. Production expanded quickly, as did profits. In 1816, a second, larger mill was built next to the first mill. In addition to producing cloth, it also produced textile machinery for other companies. The two mills were later connected in 1843, as part of a planned expansion.

The power loom was soon copied by many other New England area mills, and modified and perfected along the way. Francis Cabot Lowell died in 1817, at age 42.

== The Waltham System ==
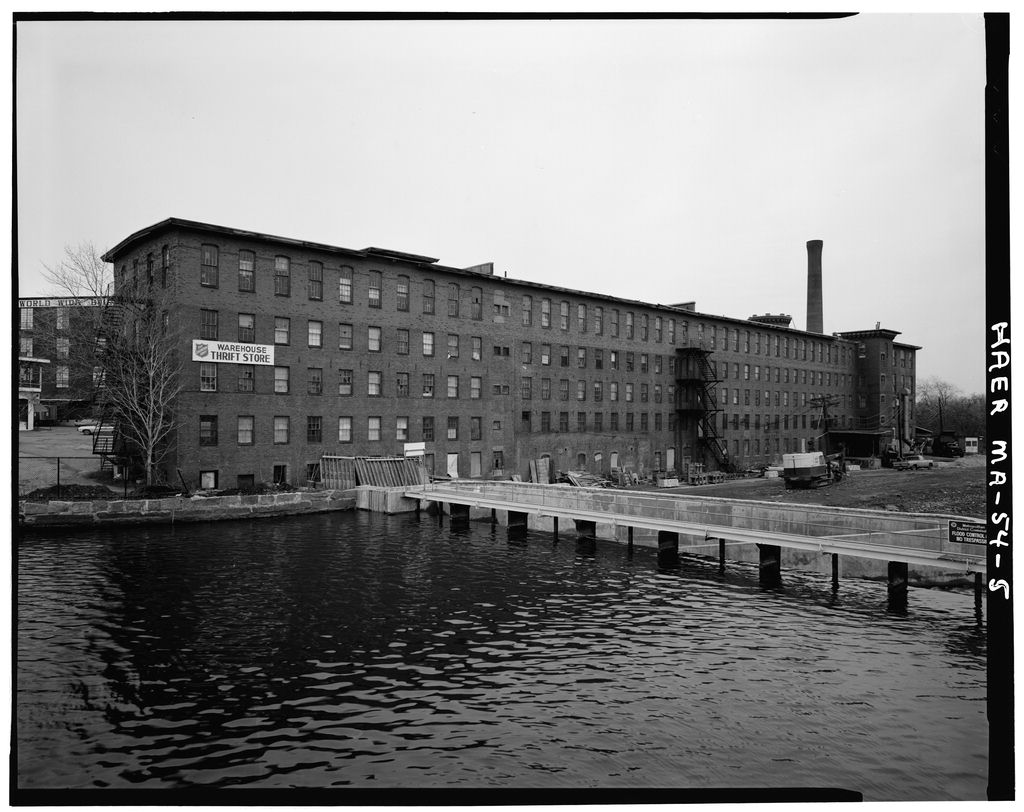
Boston Manufacturing Company (1978), HAER-54

The Boston Associates attempted to create a well-controlled system of labor which varied from the harsh conditions observed while in Lancashire. The mill owners recruited young Yankee farm girls from the surrounding area to work the machines at Waltham. The mill girls, as they came to be known, lived in boarding houses provided by the company and were supervised by older women, and were subject to strict codes of conduct. They worked approximately eighty hours per week. The workers would wake to the factory bell at 4:40 in the morning. They would report to work at 5:00 and have a half-hour breakfast break at 7:00 a.m. They would then work until the half-hour to forty-five-minute lunch break at noon. At 7:00 p.m. the factory would shut down and the workers would return to their company houses. This routine was followed six days a week. This system became known as the Waltham System.

By the early 1820s, the water power of the Charles River at Waltham was just about maximized, and the investors sought a new location to build even more mills. As the Merrimack Manufacturing Company, in 1822 they copied the Waltham System at the new city of Lowell, Massachusetts, on a much larger scale. The same group of investors would later establish Lawrence, Massachusetts; Manchester, New Hampshire; and several other new industrial centers throughout New England during the first half of the 19th century. The factory methods introduced at Waltham would also be copied by other industries in the years to follow.

The Waltham site would be expanded again during the late 19th century. The original mills were connected, the gable roofs removed, and additional floors were added with flat roofs. The Boston Manufacturing Company closed in 1930.

It was declared a National Historic Landmark in 1977. Some of the company's worker housing has also been listed on the National Register of Historic Places.

Today, the site is occupied by the Charles River Museum of Industry and Innovation, United States Department of Housing and Urban Development-subsidized housing for seniors, the Ira B. Gordon Center For the Arts (part of the Waltham Mills Artists Association), and other housing.

== See also ==
- Lowell Mill Girls
- Lowell Mills
- List of National Historic Landmarks in Massachusetts
- National Register of Historic Places listings in Waltham, Massachusetts
