= New England Offering =

The New England Offering (women mill workers' magazine)
- Discipline: Literary journal
- Language: English
- Edited by: Harriet Farley

Publication details
- History: 1847–1850
- Frequency: Monthly

Standard abbreviations
- ISO 4: N. Engl. Offer.

The New England Offering was a collection of journal entries that were written by female mill workers in New England mills. Many of the women who were contributing to the magazine were working in mills in Lowell, Massachusetts. The “Lowell Offering” was a collection of narratives where women shared their works in a intellectual and cultural publication. The contributors took great pride in the magazine. The “Lowell Offering” gained a great deal amount of popularity. It was read by famous writers such as Charles Dickens, Anthony Trollope, and George Sand. The “Lowell Offering” lost momentum after the opinions of the writers moved towards areas that mill owners did not agree with. The “New England Offering” was established after controversy with the Lowell Offering erupted and the editors Harriet Farley and Harriott F. Curtis had to discontinue the “Lowell Offering” and start a new magazine. The magazine's first issue appeared in September 1847, and Farley ended publication with the March 1850 issue.

== Purpose ==
The purpose of the magazine was to shed light on what women who were working in mills were like. It was very common for people to believe that women working in the mills were uneducated and simply there to work. However many women who were working the mills wanted to purpose intellectual and cultural activities. The women who were contributing to the magazine wanted to alter the views that European social reformers and union supporters had on factory girls. The magazine was also written to emphasize that self-improvement was vital when becoming a lady. The magazine aimed to continue a women’s education, even though they were working. The “New England Offering” was a way for mill workers who were traditionally lower-class citizens to become published. It encouraged education amongst the workers who contributed to the magazine and let women express their creative side.

== Contents ==
The “New England Offering” consisted of poems. songs, daily accounts, historical, religious, fictional and travel narratives. Many of the contents are short stories and accounts that showcase a woman’s creative abilities. Some of the contents include information about what it was like on a daily basis for mill workers, what it means to be kind to strangers, the mill they were working in, and prayers.

== Editors ==
The two editors and for the “New England Offering” were Harriot F. Curtis and Harriet Farley. Harriet Farley became a contributor to the “Lowell Offering” after she worked in a mill. As she continued to write for the magazine, and the controversy with the journal rose she took a more authoritative role and become the editor, publisher, and proprietor for the new and improved magazine, the “New England Offering”. Farley was very passionate about the magazine and worked so that women would be able to share their writings, regardless of what mill owners thought. There is not a great deal amount of information about Curtis’ contribution to the Offering or her life. Curtis and Farley were full-time employees for the magazine.

== See also ==
- List of mill towns in Massachusetts
- Lowell Mills
- Lowell Offering
