= Harriet Hanson Robinson =

American suffragist (1825–1911)

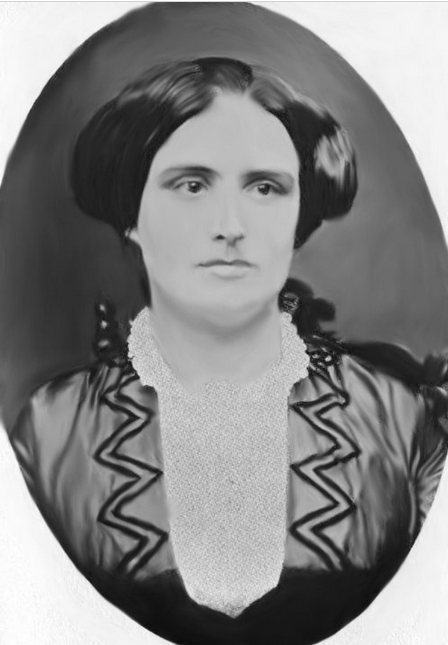
- Harriet Hanson in 1843
- Born: Harriet Jane Hanson; February 8, 1825; Boston, Massachusetts
- Died: December 22, 1911 (aged 86); Malden, Massachusetts
- Occupation: Author
- Known for: Loom and Spindle: Life Among the Early Mill Girls

Harriet Jane Hanson Robinson (February 8, 1825 – December 22, 1911) worked as a bobbin doffer in a Massachusetts cotton mill and was involved in a turnout, became a poet and author, and played an important role in the women's suffrage movement in the United States.

== Early life ==
Harriet was the daughter of Harriet Browne Hanson and the carpenter William Hanson. Both parents were descended from early English settlers but without distinguished ancestors. Her elder brother was John Wesley Hanson (1823–1901), (Note: He would become prominent in the Universalism movement and the author of several books on the subject.) and she had two surviving younger brothers: Benjamin and William. Harriet's father died when she was five, which left his widow to support four young children.

Harriet's mother was determined to keep her family together, despite the difficulty in doing so. Harriet later recalled in her autobiography Loom and Spindle (Hanson Robinson 1898) her mother's response after a neighbour had offered to adopt Harriet so that her mother had one less mouth to feed: "No; while I have one meal of victuals a day, I will not part with my children." She later wrote that her mother's words on that occasion stuck with her "because of the word 'victuals'", whose meaning she wondered for a long time thereafter.

Initially, Mrs. Hanson ran a small store in Boston, Massachusetts, which sold food, candy, and firewood. The family lived in the back room of the shop, all sharing one bed "two at the foot and three at the head," as Harriet would later recall. At the invitation of Harriet's maternal aunt, Angeline Cudworth, also a widow, the family moved to Lowell, Massachusetts, a center of the textile industry.

Lowell was a planned mill town. Under the Lowell System, the company recruited young women (15-35) from New England farms to work in the mills. The companies built boardinghouses managed by older women, often widows, to provide meals and safe places to live. Churches and cultural organizations offered lectures, concerts, reading rooms, improvement circles and other cultural and educational opportunities. Another attraction were good cash wages compared to domestic work and teaching, which paid much less.

== Mill worker ==
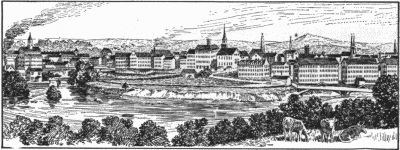
Lowell, Massachusetts, in the early 1800s

Mrs. Hanson obtained a job as a boardinghouse keeper for the Tremont Mills in Lowell, Massachusetts. During the summer of 1836, Harriet started to work part-time at the Tremont Mills. By her own account, she wanted to work to be able to earn money for herself, and the experience was good for her. However, there may have been an element of necessity since her mother earned little money from running the boarding house. Her job, which paid $2 per week, was as a "doffer," who replaced full bobbins with empty ones. The job took only a quarter of each hour, and during the free periods, the boys and girls could play or read or even go home for a while.

In 1836, the Lowell Mill Girls organized another strike, or "turn out" as they called them. The first strike had been in 1834 over a 15% cut in wages. The second strike was over an increase in board charges that was equivalent to a 12.5% cut in wages. To Harriet, who was eleven, it was her first "turn out." In her autobiography, she recounted it with pride:

When the day came on which the girls were to turn out, those in the upper rooms started first, and so many of them left that our mill was at once shut down. Then, when the girls in my room stood irresolute, uncertain what to do, asking each other, "Would you?" or "Shall we turn out?" and not one of them having the courage to lead off, I, who began to think they would not go out, after all their talk, became impatient, and started on ahead, saying, with childish bravado, "I don't care what you do, I am going to turn out, whether any one else does or not"; and I marched out, and was followed by the others.

— Hanson Robinson 1898, pp. 84–85 (Note: Claudia Lauper Bushman observes that Harriet's account of the strike she experienced when she was a child grew in the telling over the years. Although it failed ro differ in the facts, the story that Harriet told in her fifties of the incident was less embellished than the account given in her later autobiography and also it was less embellished than when she related it at the International Council of Women in Washington, DC, in 1888, which impressed at least one newspaper reporter who interviewed her at the time. Bushman comments that by her linking the incident, in her autobiography, to the cause of women's suffrage that she actually failed to take up until she was much older, Harriet effectively wrote herself a place in history, where she has become credited as a pioneer and leader at an early age in the women's suffage movement. However, Harriet's room was just one of over 200 such mill rooms since there were nearly 2000 strikers in all in many of which girls and women who would have taken similar action in the face of indecisiveness, and, even by Harriet's own account, that act of "childish bravado" was all that she did of note in a month-long strike.)

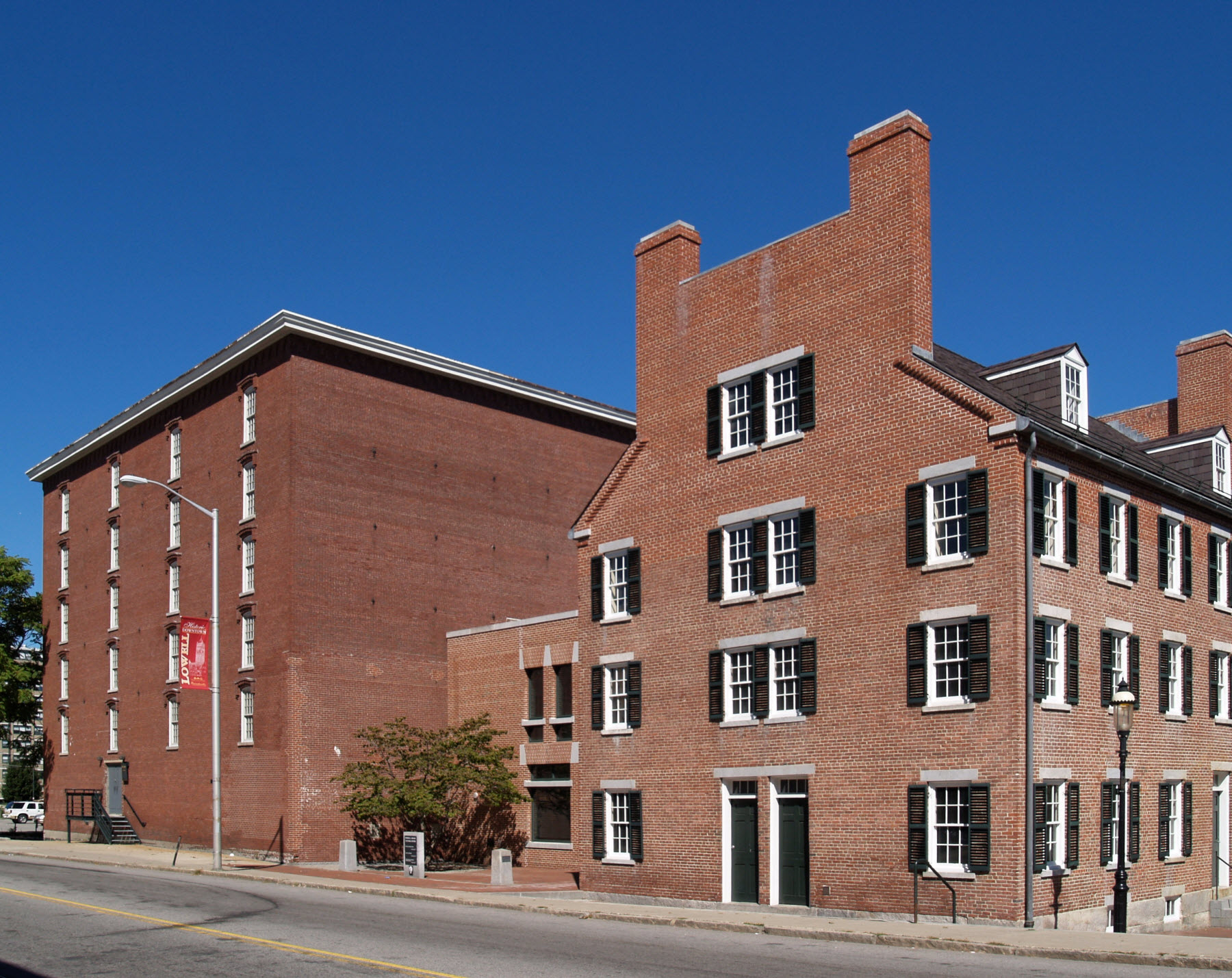
Boott Mills boardinghouse and storehouse, Lowell

Harriet was harming her own mother by striking since her mother would have benefited from the increase in boarding charges. Harriet did not realize that until she was older.

As a consequence of the turn out, several of the mills reversed the increase in charges, and the boarding system was reviewed on the grounds that since it was the principal inducement for young women and girls to come and work at the mills in the first place, it must not be having the desired effect if they were so dissatisfied that they struck. However, the turn out organizers were fired from their jobs, as was Harriet's mother, which Harriet depicted in her autobiography as an act of petty revenge for Harriet's own actions.

Harriet continued to work in the mills after the turn out was over and graduated to tending a spinning frame and then becoming a "drawing-in girl," one of the better jobs in the mill. The drawing room was relatively quiet, away from the spinning and weaving machinery.

The drawing-in girl took over after the warp threads had been wound onto the take-up beam and drew each thread through the harness and reeds using a long metal hook. She could sit on a stool or a chair as she worked. Once that was complete, the beam would be delivered to the weaving room. The pay was on a piecework basis and so Harriet could work at her own pace, and while the looms were operating, she could find a quiet room away from the machinery in which she was able to read.

== Education ==
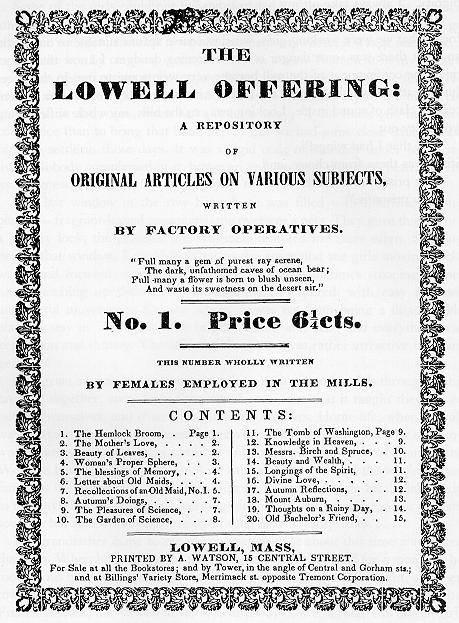
Lowell Offering number 1, 1840. "Wholly written by females employed in the mills"

Harriet had obtained an elementary education before she started work in the mill. While she worked as a doffer, she also attended evening classes.

At the age of 15 she left the mills for two years to study French, Latin, and English grammar and composition at Lowell High School. She studied in a wooden school room in a building that had a butcher's shop on the ground floor.

The titles of two of her compositions have survived: "Poverty Not Disgraceful" and "Indolence and Industry", reflecting her opinion that there was nothing wrong with the honest labor of poor people.

Harriet returned to the mills and worked there until 1848 but, in her spare time, participated in literary groups in Lowell.

Lowell was rich in educational and cultural opportunities for women at the time. There were libraries and bookstores, evening schools and lectures, concerts and balls. Two of the first magazines written by women were published in the town, the Lowell Offering and The New England Offering. Betsey Guppy Chamberlain (1797–1886), one of Harriet's companions in the mills, became a noted contributor of sketches and stories to the Lowell Offering. Harriet said that "the fame of The Lowell Offering caused the mill girls to be considered very desirable for wives; and that young men came from near and far to pick and choose for themselves, and generally with good success." Harriet also wrote and published poetry, and it was through this that she met her future husband, William Robinson, who worked as an editor at the Lowell Journal, which published some of her work.

== Marriage ==
Harriet married William Stevens Robinson (1818–1876) on Thanksgiving Day in 1848, when she was 23. Also from a poor background, Robinson was a writer for a newspaper and a supporter of the Free Soil Party, which opposed the expansion of slavery into the western territories and made it hard for him to keep a job. During the early years of her marriage, Harriet was not interested in women's rights. In her early writings, she described the pleasure of having a husband to handle worldly problems, and her job was to take care of him and said that for that reason she did not want to vote. Harriet later adopted the women's rights cause, after her husband had taken it up. The couple would have four children, one of whom died young, and they also looked after Harriet's mother. Often, they struggled to make ends meet.

In 1858, the couple moved to Malden, a new residential suburb five miles from Boston and bought a house two blocks from the railway station. That was to be Harriet's home for the rest of her life.

At first, Robinson struggled to earn a living as a journalist. The couple had a large garden, grew fruit and vegetables, and made some money by raising chickens and selling the eggs.

In 1862 Robinson held a well-paying job as clerk of the Massachusetts House of Representatives for 11 years.

In 1868 Harriet joined the American Woman's Suffrage Organization, led by Lucy Stone, and founded the Malden women's club. Robinson was forced out of his job by the politician Benjamin Butler, and in 1876 died after a long illness.

Her daughter, Hattie, served as assistant clerk of the Massachusetts House of Representatives in 1872, being the first woman to hold such a position. Another daughter Elizabeth was considered to be a pioneer in introducing kindergarten to Connecticut.

== Later life ==
As a widow, Harriet Robinson rented out rooms to support herself, her three daughters and her aged mother. She wrote several books, including a biography of her husband, and became increasingly active in the women's suffrage movement. Harriet's book Loom and Spindle (1898) portrayed the industrial town of Lowell in her childhood and youth as a time of great opportunity for mill girls, who learned the discipline of labor and gained broader ideas about the world from their experiences. The book continues to be read more than 100 years after it was published.

Harriet and her daughter Harriet Lucy Robinson Shattuck organized the National Woman Suffrage Association of Massachusetts, associated with Susan B. Anthony's organization, and Harriet Robinson made the opening address at the 1881 Boston Convention of the organization. They also helped Julia Ward Howe to organize the New England Women's Club. Harriet Robinson corresponded extensively with the suffrage movement leaders Elizabeth Cady Stanton and Susan B. Anthony. When the National Woman Suffrage Association opened on 26 May 1881 at the Tremont Temple in Boston, Harriet Robinson welcomed the delegates and guests. At this session she offered the following resolution: "Whereas, We believe that it is not safe to trust the great question of woman's political rights solely to the legislature, or to the voters of the state, therefore Resolved, That it is the duty of the women of Massachusetts to organize an active work, to secure a sixteenth amendment to the United States Constitution." Harriet Robinson wrote enthusiastically in 1881,

Never, in the history of civilization, has woman held the political, legal or social position that she does in Massachusetts today! New avenues of employment for her capacity are constantly being opened, and in every department of public trust to which she has been promoted, she has shown her ability. In this first hour of woman's triumph, it only remains for her to keep what she has gained and use faithfully the new privileges which have come into her life.... Trained leaders are needed—women strong of purpose, who are willing to confront the public as presiding officers, or as public speakers, and to guide wisely the large masses of their sex who have not yet learned to think for themselves....

Harriet never took a theoretical position on women's rights and may have been largely motivated by an ambition to advance in society, which the movement offered. However, she became a formidable advocate of suffrage in her writings and as a public speaker. Unable to reconcile her labor-focused advocacy with the suffrage movement's leaders, she withdrew as reporter of Massachusetts organizing for Volume I of the History of Woman Suffrage book series and instead separately published Massachusetts in the Woman Suffrage Movement in 1881.

The poet Lucy Larcom, a friend of Harriet who had also worked in the mills as a child, wrote of her, "Mrs. Robinson is deeply interested in all the movements, which tend to the advancement of women, and uses her pen and her voice freely in their behalf. She was the first woman to speak before the Select Committee on Woman Suffrage in Congress, and has spoken for the cause before the legislature of her own State, where she is not only a citizen, but a vote as far as the law allows."

Additionally, Harriet contributed to the fourteenth annual report of the Massachusetts Bureau of Statistics of Labor, which was published in 1883. Here is an excerpt from the annual report written by Harriet Robinson:

They [the mill girls] went forth from their Alma Mater, the Lowell Factory, carrying with them the independence, the self-reliance taught in that hard school, and they have done their little part towards performing the useful labor of life. Into whatever vocation they entered they have made practical use of the habits of industry and perseverance learned during those early years. Skilled labor teaches something not to be found in books or in colleges. Their early experience developed their characters... and helped them to fight well the battle of life.

Harriet lived to the age of 86 and died at home in Malden on 22 December 1911.

== Bibliography ==
Although she published several books, Harriet Robinson did not make money from her writings, which she published at her own expense.

=== Books ===
- Hanson Robinson, Harriet (1877). "Warrington" pen-portraits: a collection of personal and political reminiscences from 1848 to 1876, from the writings of William S. Robinson. Boston, Pub. by Mrs. W. S. Robinson.
- Hanson Robinson, Harriet (1881). Massachusetts in the woman suffrage movement. A general, political, legal and legislative history from 1774, to 1881.
- Hanson Robinson, Harriet (1883). Early Factory Labor in New England.
- Hanson Robinson, Harriet (1887). Captain Mary Miller: A Drama. Boston, W.H. Baker & co.
- Hanson Robinson, Harriet (1889). The New Pandora: A Drama. The Knickerbocker Press ).
- Hanson Robinson, Harriet (1898). Loom and Spindle, or Life Among the Early Mill Girls. New York, Crowell.
- Loom and Spindle public domain audiobook at LibriVox

=== In anthologies ===
- Davis, David Brion (1979). Antebellum American Culture: An Interpretive Anthology. Penn State University Press. pp. 121–123. ISBN 9780271016467.
- Hanson Robinson, Harriet (1999). "Names and Noms de Plume of the Writers in The Lowell Offering (1902)". In Ranta, Judith A. (ed.). Women and Children of the Mills: An Anotated Guide to Nineteenth-Century American Textile Factory Literature. Westport, CT: Greenwood Press. p. 299.

== Sources ==
- Babitskaya, Inna (27 March 2012). "Celebrating Women's History Month: A Profile of Suffragist Harriet Hanson Robinson". NoBo Magazine.
- Bushman, Claudia L. (1981). "A Good Poor Man's Wife": Being a Chronicle of Harriet Hanson Robinson and Her Family in Nineteenth-Century New England. Hannover, CT: University Press of New England. ISBN 9780874518832.
- Danzer, Gerald A. (2006). "The Changing Workplace". The Americans. Houghton Mifflin College Div. pp. 242–243. ISBN 9780618015337.
- Emerson, Dorothy May; Edwards, June; Knox, Helene (2000). Standing Before Us: Unitarian Universalist Women and Social Reform, 1776–1936. Unitarian Universalist Association of Congregations. ISBN 978-1-55896-380-1.
- Hanson, John Wesley (1885). Bible threatenings explained: or, passages of scripture sometimes quoted to prove endless punishment shown to teach consequences of limited duration. Universalist Publishing House.
- Marsh, Margaret S. (1990-02-01). Suburban Lives. Rutgers University Press. p. 48. ISBN 978-0-8135-1484-0.
- McNeese, Tim (2003-09-01). Revolutionary War. Lorenz Educational Press. ISBN 978-0-7877-0583-1.
- Peterson, Tracie; Miller, Judith (2003-07-01). Fragile Design, A. Bethany House. p. 183. ISBN 978-0-7642-2689-2.
- Ranta, Judith A. (2003-04-01). The Life and Writings of Betsey Chamberlain: Native American Mill Worker. UPNE. ISBN 978-1-55553-564-3.
- Stanton, Elizabeth Cady; Gordon, Ann Dexter (2006-09-25). The Selected Papers of Elizabeth Cady Stanton and Susan B. Anthony: When clowns make laws for Queens, 1880–1887. Rutgers University Press. pp. 8–. ISBN 978-0-8135-2320-0.
