= The Rhode Island System =

The Rhode Island System refers to a system of mills, complete with small villages and farms, ponds, dams, and spillways first developed by Samuel Slater (who had earlier built the first fully functional water-powered textile mill in America at Pawtucket, Rhode Island, in 1790) and his brother John Slater.

The Blackstone River Valley of Massachusetts and Rhode Island consists of a series of historic mill villages that followed the Rhode Island system, and which gave birth to the American Industrial Revolution. Today the 69 mile stretch of river valley and the system of mills and villages is a national heritage corridor, The Blackstone River Valley National Heritage Corridor, that encompasses sections of two states. The Blackstone River Valley National Heritage Corridor was the second heritage corridor of its type in the US national Park service, having been chartered first in 1986.

== See also ==
- Waltham-Lowell system
