= Waltham-Lowell system =

Textile production system in the United States

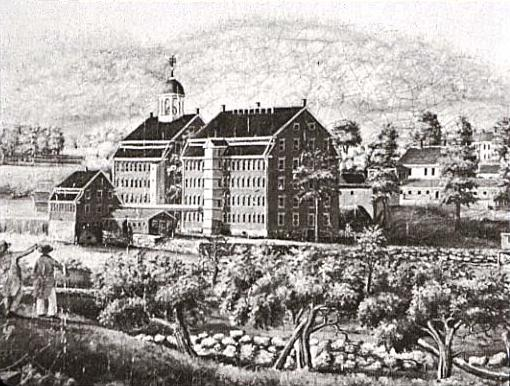
Boston Manufacturing Co., Waltham, Massachusetts

The Waltham-Lowell system was a labor and production model employed during the rise of the textile industry in the United States, particularly in New England, during the rapid expansion of the Industrial Revolution in the early 19th century.

The textile industry was one of the earliest to become mechanized, made possible by inventions such as the spinning jenny, spinning mule, and water frame around the time of the American Revolution. Models of production and labor sources were first explored in textile manufacturing. The system used domestic labor, often referred to as mill girls, young women who came to the new textile centers from rural towns to earn more money than they could at home, and to live a cultured life in the city. Their life was very regimented: they lived in boarding houses and were held to strict hours and a moral code.

Competition grew in the domestic textile industry and wages declined, so workers began to go on strike. Resistance was led by the mill girls. With the mid-nineteenth-century growth in immigration and social changes post-Civil War, mill owners began to recruit immigrants, who often arrived with skills and were willing to work for lower wages. By mid-century, the Waltham-Lowell system proved unprofitable and collapsed.

== Precursor ==
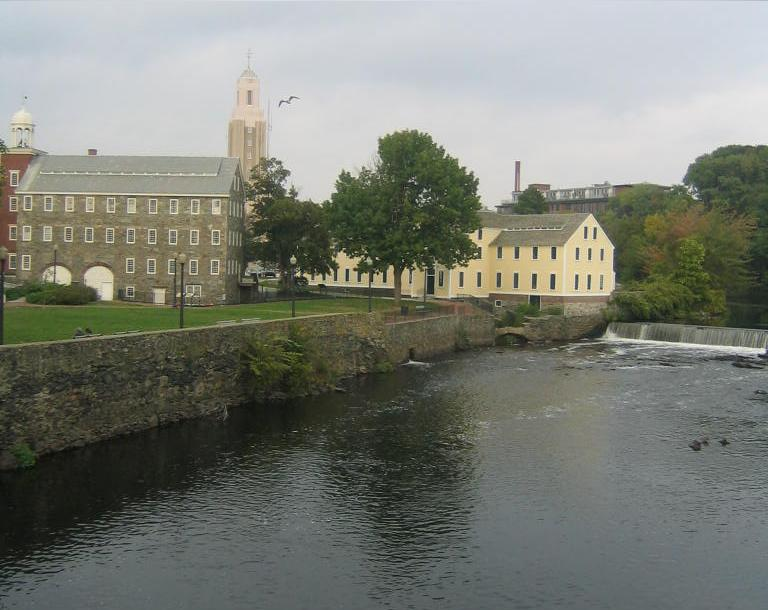
Slater Mill

The precursor to the Waltham-Lowell system was used in Rhode Island, where British immigrant Samuel Slater set up his first spinning mills in 1793 under the sponsorship of Moses Brown. Slater drew on his British mill experience to create a factory system called the Rhode Island System, based on the customary patterns of family life in New England villages.

He first employed children aged 7 to 12 at the mill, and personally supervised them. He hired the first child workers in 1790. Slater had tried to recruit women and children from other areas for the mill, but that fell through due to the close-knit framework of the New England family. Instead, he recruited whole families, and developed entire company towns. He provided company-owned housing nearby, along with company stores. He also sponsored a Sunday School where college students taught the children to read and write.

== Characteristics ==
The Waltham-Lowell system pioneered the use of a vertically integrated system. Here the owner/managers had complete control over all aspects of production. Spinning, weaving, dyeing, and cutting were now completed in a single plant. This high degree of control prevented another company from any interference with production.

The Waltham mill also pioneered the process of mass production, which greatly increased the scale of manufacturing. Water-powered line shafts and belts connected hundreds of power lines. The increase in manufacturing occurred so rapidly that there was no localized labor supply in the early 19th century that could have sufficed. Lowell solved this problem by hiring young women, typically from rural areas and small towns.

=== Waltham ===
After the successes of Samuel Slater, a group of investors called The Boston Associates and led by Newburyport, Massachusetts merchant Francis Cabot Lowell devised a new textile operation on the Charles River in Waltham, Massachusetts, west of Boston. This firm was the first in the nation to place cotton-to-cloth production under one roof, incorporated as the Boston Manufacturing Company in 1814.

The Boston Associates tried to create a controlled system of labor, unlike the harsh conditions that they observed while in Lancashire, England. The owners recruited young New England farm girls from the surrounding area to work the machines at Waltham. The mill girls lived in company boarding houses and were subject to strict codes of conduct and supervised by older women. They worked about 80 hours a week. Six days per week, they woke to the factory bell at 4:40 a.m. and reported to work at 5 before a half-hour breakfast break at 7. They worked until a lunch break of 30 to 45 minutes around noon. The workers returned to their company houses at 7 p.m. when the factory closed. This system became known as the Waltham System.

=== Lowell ===
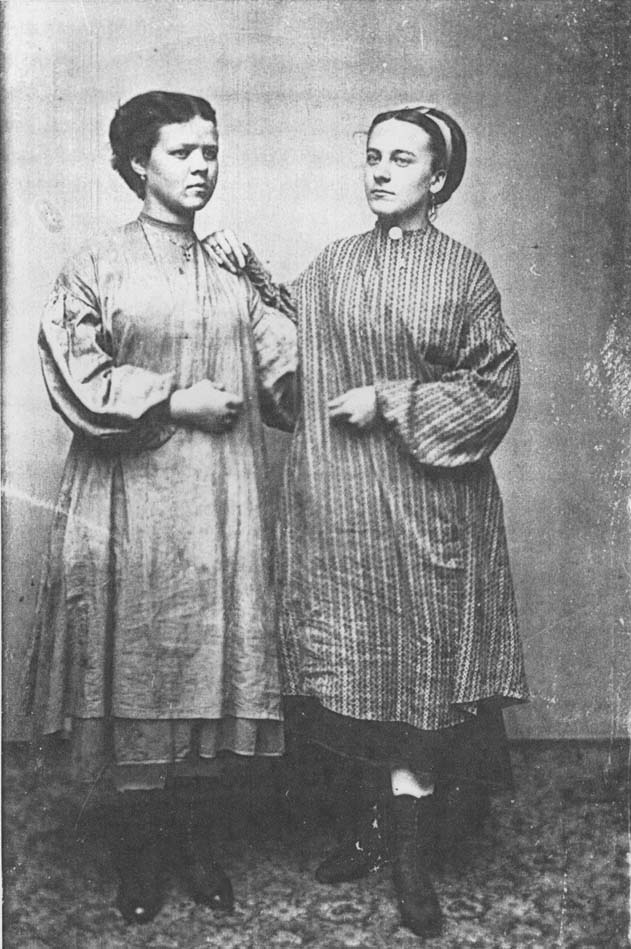
Tintype of two young women in Lowell, Massachusetts (circa 1871)

The Boston Manufacturing Company proved immensely profitable, but the Charles River had little potential as a power source. Francis Cabot Lowell died prematurely in 1817, and soon his partners traveled north of Boston to East Chelmsford, Massachusetts, where the large Merrimack River could provide far more power.

The first mills formed the Merrimack Manufacturing Company and were running by 1823. The settlement was incorporated as the town of Lowell in 1826 and became the city of Lowell ten years later. It boasted ten textile corporations, all running on the Waltham System and each considerably larger than the Boston Manufacturing Company. Lowell became one of the largest cities in New England. The model became known as the Lowell System; it was copied elsewhere in New England, often in other mill towns developed by Boston Associates.

== Decline ==
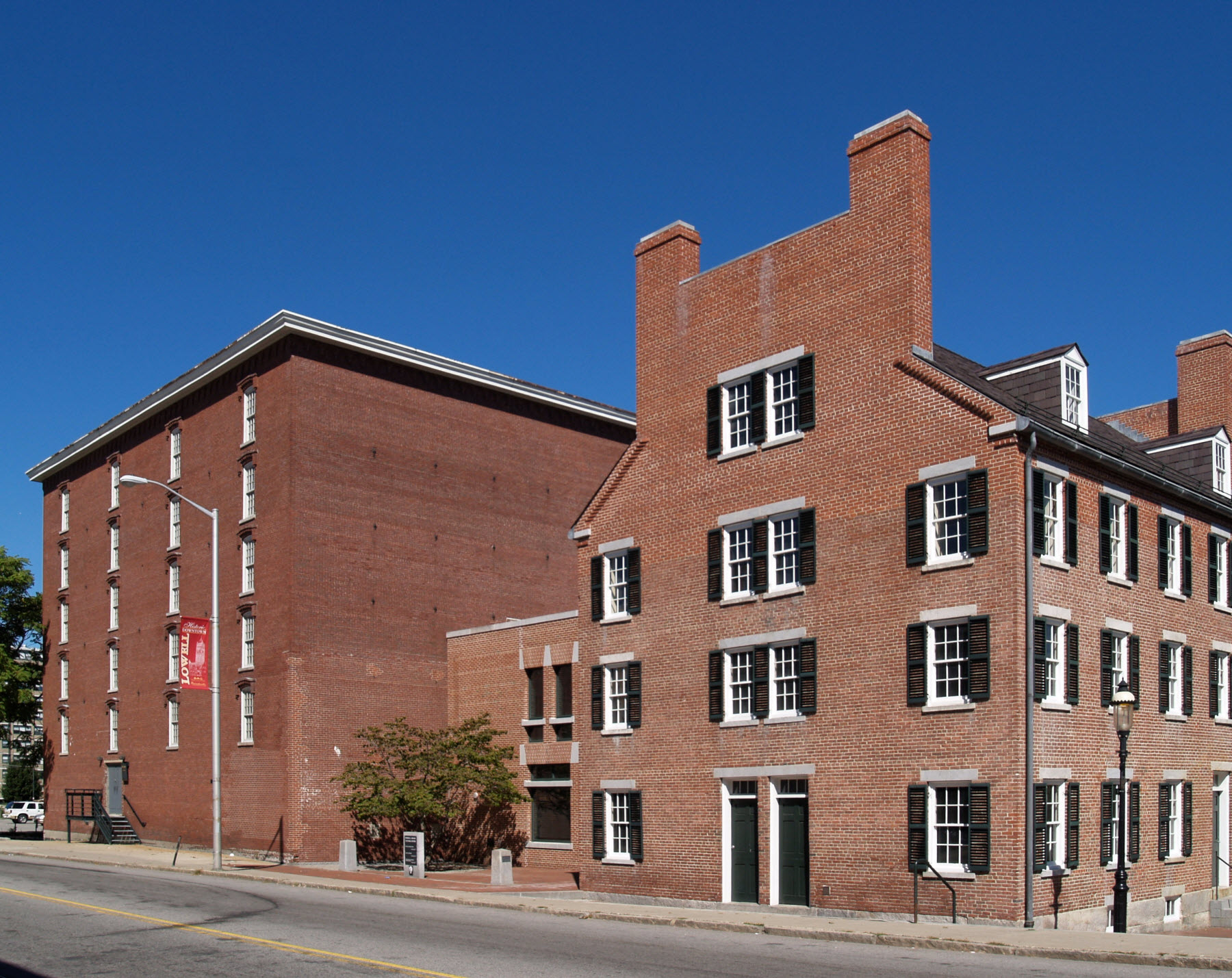
One of the last remaining textile mill boarding houses in Lowell, Massachusetts on right, part of the Lowell National Historical Park

Eventually, cheaper and less organized foreign labor replaced the mill girls. Even by the time of the founding of Lawrence in 1845, there were questions being raised about the viability of this model. One of the leading causes of this transition to foreign labor and the demise of the Lowell system was the coming of the Civil War.

Girls served informally as nurses, moved back to their family farms to help these run, or took other positions that men had left when they joined the army. These girls were out of the mills for the duration of the Civil War. When the mills reopened after the war, the girls did not return because they no longer needed the mills; they had rooted into their new occupations or moved on in life to the point where the mill was no longer suitable for them. The lack of mill girls meant that the owners turned to Irish immigrants, who had arrived in number beginning in the mid-1840s fleeing the Great Famine (1845-1852).

The Irish community developing in Lowell, Massachusetts was not exclusively female, unlike the previous housing of mill girls in dormitories. The proportion of male employment at the mill increased, which rapidly changed the demographics of the people that worked there. The Lowell plant became highly dependent on the foreign lower-class, especially the Irish immigrants who flocked to Massachusetts.

== See also ==
- Mills and Factories in the Industrial United States
