= William Robinson =

William, Will, or Bill Robinson may refer to:

== Academics ==
- William Robinson (fl. 1670), founder of the Robinson's School in Penrith, Cumbria
- William Robinson (benefactor) (1794–1864), American school founder
- William Callyhan Robinson (1834–1911), American law professor at Yale
- William H. Robinson, American professor of electrical engineering
- William I. Robinson (born 1959), professor of sociology at the University of California, Santa Barbara
- William P. Robinson (born 1949), American educator, former president of Whitworth University
- William S. Robinson (1913–1996), American statistician who defined the ecological fallacy
- Bill Robinson (scientist) (1938–2011), New Zealand scientist, inventor of the lead rubber bearing
- W. C. Robinson (educator) (William Claiborne Robinson, 1861–1914), mathematics professor and president of Louisiana Tech University

== Entertainment ==
- William Robinson (British painter) (1799–1839), English portrait-painter
- W. Heath Robinson (1872–1944), British cartoonist and illustrator
- Bill Robinson (1878–1949), American tap dancer known as Mr. Bojangles
- W. C. Robinson (1884–1942), actor known as William Robinson
- Bill Robinson (author) (1918–2007), American nautical author
- Willie Robinson (singer) (1926–2007), American blues singer
- Bill Robinson (jazz singer) (born 1929), American jazz singer
- Smokey Robinson (born 1940), American R&B and soul singer born William Robinson, Jr.
- Will Robinson (music producer) (born 1967), British music producer
- William Robinson (Australian painter) (1936–2025), Australian painter and lithographer
- William Ellsworth Robinson (1861–1918), American magician who used the stage name Chung Ling Soo
- Will Robinson, a fictional character in the Lost in Space television and film franchise

== Politics ==
=== United States ===
- William Robinson (Rhode Island official) (1693–1751), deputy governor of the Colony of Rhode Island and Providence Plantations
- William Robinson Jr. (1785–1868), American politician and businessman
- William Erigena Robinson (1814–1892), US Representative from New York
- William Whipple Robinson (active 1874–1906), Los Angeles City auditor
- William Robinson (Wisconsin politician) (1825–1895), English-born Wisconsin politician
- William F. Robinson (1913–2008), American politician in the Erie County Legislature
- William Edmond Robinson (1920–1992), American politician in Missouri
- William G. Robinson (1926–2011), American politician in Massachusetts
- William P. Robinson Sr. (1911–1981), American politician in Virginia
- Billy Robinson (politician) (1942–2006), American politician in Virginia
- William Russell Robinson (1942–2020), American politician
- Lee Robinson (politician) (William Lee Robinson, 1943–2015), American politician in Georgia
- Will Robinson (Florida politician), (born 1975), American politician in Florida
- William P. Robinson III (active since 1988), Rhode Island Supreme Court justice
- William M. Robinson, American politician from Mississippi
- William N. Robinson, member of the California State Assembly

=== United Kingdom ===
- William Robinson (by 1515-55/58), MP for Worcester
- William Robinson (1522–1616), MP for City of York
- William Robinson (fl. 1559), MP for Bath
- Sir William Robinson, 1st Baronet (1655–1736), English member of parliament and Lord Mayor of York
- William Robinson (died 1717) (1668–1717), MP for Denbigh Boroughs in 1705
- William C. F. Robinson (1834–1897), British colonial administrator and musical composer
- William C. Robinson (politician) (1861–1931), British Labour member of parliament
- William Edward Robinson (1863–1927), English merchant and Liberal Party politician
- William Albert Robinson (1877–1949), Welsh politician, member of parliament for St Helens
- William Robinson (Walthamstow East MP) (1909–1968), British Labour Party MP, 1966–1968

=== Australia ===
- Bill Robinson (Australian politician) (1907–1981), Australian senator
- William Robinson (Tasmanian politician) (1879–1960), member of the Tasmanian Legislative Council
- William Alfred Robinson (Australian politician) (1852–1927), South Australian politician
- William C. F. Robinson, British colonial administrator, governor of South Australia 1883–1889
- William Walsh Robinson (1888–1972), farmer and politician in South Australia

=== Canada ===
- Ken Robinson (Canadian politician) (William Kenneth Robinson, 1927–1991), member of Canadian parliament from Ontario
- William Robinson (Ontario politician) (1823–1912), Canadian politician in Ontario
- William Alfred Robinson (Canadian politician) (1905–1957), Liberal party member of the Canadian House of Commons
- William Benjamin Robinson (1797–1873), Canadian fur trader and political figure

=== Other countries ===
- William Robinson (colonial administrator, born 1836) (1836–1912), British colonial governor in the Caribbean and Hong Kong
- William Robinson (runholder) (1814–1889), member of the New Zealand Legislative Council
- William Rose Robinson (1822–1886), governor of Madras, 1875

== Religion ==
- William Robinson (martyr), Quaker martyr
- William Robinson (priest) (died 1642), archdeacon of Nottingham
- William Robinson (theologian) (1886–1963), British theologian
- William Robinson (bishop) (1916–2002), Canadian Anglican bishop

== Sports ==
=== Football and rugby ===
- William Robinson (American football) (born 1984)
- William S. Robinson (active 1896–1899), American football coach
- Bill Robinson (American football) (1929–2016)
- Bill Robinson (English footballer) (1919–1992), footballer for Sunderland, Charlton Athletic and West Ham United
- Billy Robinson (footballer, born 1925) (1925–1953), English footballer for Stockport County and Accrington Stanley
- Bill Robinson (footballer, born 1880) (1880–1967), Australian rules footballer with Essendon
- William Robinson (footballer, born 1880) (1880–1926), English footballer for Manchester City, Bolton Wanderers and Hull City
- Bill Robinson (footballer, born 1908) (1908–1968), Australian rules footballer with Melbourne
- Bill Robinson (Australian footballer, born 1919) (1919–2007), Australian rules footballer with Hawthorn
- Billy Robinson (Australian footballer) (1890–1969), Australian rules footballer for Carlton
- Billy Robinson (English footballer) (1903–?), English football centre half for Darlington, Southend United and Carlisle United
- Will Robinson (rugby league) (born 1971), Australian rugby league footballer of the 1990s and 2000s
- Bill Robinson (rugby league) (1934–2005), English rugby league footballer of the 1950s and 1960s

=== Other sports ===
- Bill Robinson (basketball) (1949–2020), Canadian basketball player
- Bill Robinson (outfielder) (1943–2007), American baseball player and coach
- Bill Robinson (ice hockey) (1921–2008), Canadian ice hockey centreman
- Billy Robinson (1938–2014), British professional wrestler and trainer
- Bobby Robinson (baseball) (William L. Robinson, 1903–2002), American baseball player
- Will Robinson (basketball) (1911–2008), American college basketball coach
- William Robinson (cricketer, born 1847) (1847–1929), New Zealand cricketer
- William Robinson (cricketer, born 1863) (1863–1928), New Zealand cricketer
- William Robinson (swimmer) (1870–1940), British breaststroke swimmer in the 1908 Summer Olympics
- William Robinson (boxer) (born 1936), British Olympic boxer
- Yank Robinson (William H. Robinson, 1859–1894), American baseball player
- William Robinson (trainer) (1946–2020), Canadian harness racing trainer
- Will Robinson (racing driver) (born 2004), American racing driver

== Others ==
- William Robinson (British architect) (1645–1712), surveyor general of Ireland from the 1670s until 1700
- Sir William Robinson, 2nd Baronet (1705–1785)
- William Robinson (historian) (1777–1848), solicitor and barrister
- William Robinson (law reporter) (1801–1870)
- William Robinson (murder victim) (died 1868), 1860s murder victim in British Columbia, Canada
- William Robinson (Canadian architect) (1812–1894)
- William Stevens Robinson (1818–1876), American journalist
- William D. Robinson (1826–1890), founder of the Brotherhood of Locomotive Engineers during the American Civil War
- William Robinson (banker), governor of the Bank of England, 1847
- William Robinson (gardener) (1838–1935), Irish-born gardener and journalist
- William Robinson (inventor) (1840–1921), American electrical engineer and inventor of the failsafe track circuit for railroad signaling
- William J. Robinson (1867–1936), American physician, sexologist, and birth control campaigner
- William Sydney Robinson (1876–1963), Australian businessman, industrialist, and diplomat
- Billy Robinson (aviator) (1884–1916), American aviator
- William Leefe Robinson (1895–1918), British aviator
- Bill Robinson (fashion designer) (1948–1993), American fashion designer
- Bill Robinson (auto designer) (1925–2022), American automobile designer
- William W. Robinson (1819–1903), Union Army colonel
- William Robinson (sailor) (1902–1988), American round-the-world sailor
