= Algie Howell =

American politician (born 1938)

Algie T. Howell, Jr.

Member of the Virginia House of Delegates from the 90th district
- In office January 14, 2004 – June 30, 2014
- Preceded by: Winsome Sears
- Succeeded by: Joe Lindsey

Personal details
- Born: January 8, 1938 (age 88) Holland, Virginia, U.S.
- Party: Democratic
- Spouse: Leeser B. Howell (d. 2012)
- Children: Algie T. Howell III, Alesia Howell Allen
- Education: Norfolk Division, Virginia State College; Hampton Institute
- Profession: Educator
- Committees: Appropriations; Health, Welfare and Institutions; Privileges and Elections; Rules

Military service
- Branch/service: United States Air Force
- Years of service: 1956–1960

Algie Thomas Howell, Jr. (born January 8, 1938) is an American politician. From 2004 to 2014 he was a member of the Virginia House of Delegates representing the 90th district, made up of parts of the cities of Norfolk and Virginia Beach. He is a member of the Democratic Party.

Howell has served on the House committees on Appropriations (2006–), Counties, Cities and Towns (2010–2012), General Laws (2004–2005), Health, Welfare and Institutions (2004–), Privileges and Elections (2010–), Rules (2013–), and Science and Technology (2004–2009).

== Electoral history ==
Howell first ran for the House of Delegates in 2003, when 90th district Republican Delegate Winsome Sears announced she would not seek a second term. Howell won the Democratic nomination in a May 31, 2003 caucus against 20-year House veteran William P. "Billy" Robinson, Jr., who had lost the seat to Sears in 2001. He was unopposed in the November 2003 general election.

Date	Election	Candidate	Party	Votes	%
Virginia House of Delegates, 90th district
Nov 4, 2003	General	A T Howell Jr	Democratic	3,850	97.47
Nov 4, 2003	General	Write Ins		100	2.53
Nov 4, 2003	General	Winsome Sears retired; seat changed from Republican to Democratic			
Jun 14, 2005	Democratic primary	A T Howell Jr		1,040	60.82
Jun 14, 2005	Democratic primary	K A Boose		670	39.18
Nov 8, 2005	General	A T Howell Jr	Democratic	9,438	98.73
Nov 8, 2005	General	Write Ins		121	1.27
Nov 6, 2007	General	Algie T. Howell, Jr.	Democratic	3,619	97.07
Nov 6, 2007	General	Write Ins		109	2.92
Jun 9, 2009	Democratic primary	Algie T. Howell, Jr.		1,888	69.61
Jun 9, 2009	Democratic primary	Lionell Spruill, Jr.		824	30.38
Nov 3, 2009	General	Algie T. Howell, Jr.	Democratic	7,398	66.64
Nov 3, 2009	General	Jason E. Call	Republican	3,672	33.07
Nov 3, 2009	General	Write Ins		31	0.27
Aug 23, 2011	Democratic primary	Algie T. Howell, Jr.		1,313	59.76
Aug 23, 2011	Democratic primary	Richard "Rick" James		884	40.23
Nov 8, 2011	General	Algie T. Howell, Jr.	Democratic	4,193	97.08
Nov 8, 2011	General	Write Ins		126	2.91
Jun 11, 2013	Democratic primary	Algie T. Howell, Jr.		1,759	68.18
Jun 11, 2013	Democratic primary	Richard "Rick" James		821	31.82
