= Virginia's 21st Senate district =

American legislative district

Virginia's 21st State Senate district
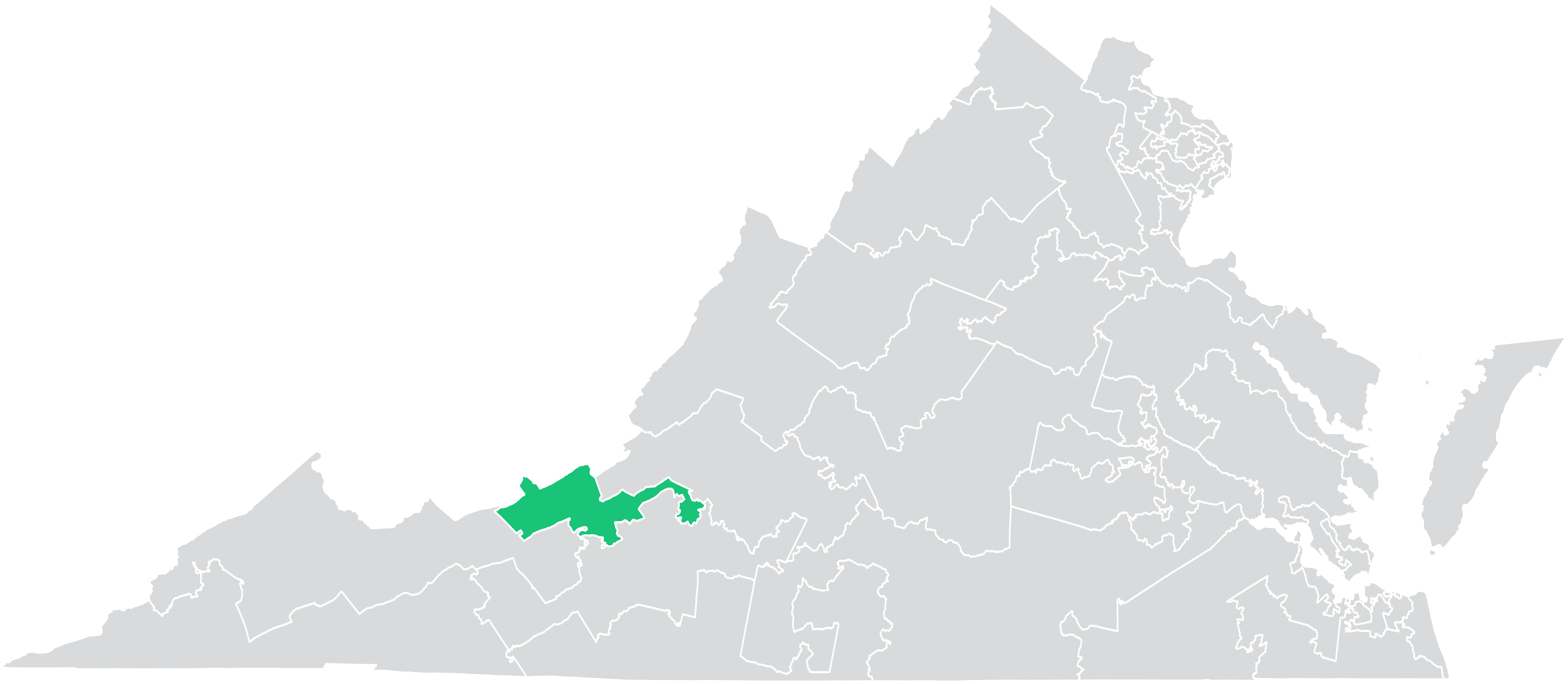
Senator
Angelia Williams Graves; D–Norfolk
- Demographics: 71% White; 16% Black; 5% Hispanic; 5% Asian; 3% Other
- Population (2019): 204,563
- Registered voters: 127,983

Virginia's 21st Senate district is one of 40 districts in the Senate of Virginia. It has been represented by Democrat Angelia Williams Graves since 2024. Graves previously represented Virginia's 90th House of Delegates district from 2021 to 2024.

== Geography ==
District 21 is located in southeastern Virginia, particularly the Hampton Roads region, and includes a portion of the City of Norfolk.

The district is located entirely within Virginia's 3rd congressional district, and overlaps with the 92nd, 93rd, 94th, and 95th districts of the Virginia House of Delegates.

== Recent election results ==
=== 2019 ===
County and independent city results Edwards: 50–60%; 70–80%; Nelson: 50–60%

2019 Virginia Senate election, District 21
Party	Candidate	Votes	%
Democratic	John S. Edwards (incumbent)	26,877	65.5
Independent	Steven Nelson	13,882	33.8
Total votes		41,046	100
Democratic hold			

=== 2015 ===
County and independent city results Edwards: 50–60%; Dye: 50–60%

2015 Virginia Senate election, District 21
Party	Candidate	Votes	%
Democratic	John S. Edwards (incumbent)	20,881	50.9
Republican	Nancy Dye	17,438	42.5
Independent	Donald Caldwell	2,626	6.4
Total votes		40,987	100
Democratic hold			

=== 2011 ===
County and independent city results Edwards: 50–60%; 60–70%; Nutter: 50–60%

2011 Virginia Senate election, District 21
Primary election
Party	Candidate	Votes	%
Republican	David Nutter	1,854	66.3
Republican	Everett Carl Tripp Godsey, III	944	33.7
Total votes		2,798	100
General election
Democratic	John S. Edwards (incumbent)	21,259	55.9
Republican	David Nutter	16,728	44.0
Total votes		38,037	100
Democratic hold			

=== Federal and statewide results ===
Year	Office	Results
2020	President	Biden 54.6–43.6%
2017	Governor	Northam 56.1–42.3%
2016	President	Clinton 50.7–42.9%
2014	Senate	Warner 54.2–42.1%
2013	Governor	McAuliffe 49.1–40.9%
2012	President	Obama 54.0–43.6%
2012	Senate	Kaine 56.9–43.1%

== Historical results ==
All election results below took place prior to 2011 redistricting, and thus were under different district lines.

=== 2007 ===
2007 Virginia Senate election, District 21
Party	Candidate	Votes	%
Democratic	John S. Edwards (incumbent)	22,282	98.2
Total votes		22,698	100
Democratic hold			

=== 2003 ===
2003 Virginia Senate election, District 21
Party	Candidate	Votes	%
Democratic	John S. Edwards (incumbent)	21,349	99.9
Total votes		21,367	100
Democratic hold			

=== 1999 ===
1999 Virginia Senate election, District 21
Party	Candidate	Votes	%
Democratic	John S. Edwards (incumbent)	23,091	58.9
Republican	William Fralin	16,133	41.1
Total votes		39,228	100
Democratic hold			

=== 1995 ===
1995 Virginia Senate election, District 21
Party	Candidate	Votes	%
Democratic	John S. Edwards	23,956	54.6
Republican	Brandon Bell (incumbent)	19,946	45.4
Total votes		43,909	100
Democratic gain from Republican			
