= Joseph C. Lindsey =

American politician

Joe Lindsey

Member of the Virginia House of Delegates from the 90th district
- In office September 18, 2014 – November 15, 2020
- Preceded by: Algie Howell
- Succeeded by: Angelia Williams Graves

Personal details
- Born: Joseph Carnell Lindsey; August 10, 1959 (age 67) Norfolk, Virginia, U.S.
- Party: Democratic
- Spouse: Rhoda Venetia German
- Education: Hampton Institute (BA); American University (JD)

Joseph Cornell Lindsey (born August 10, 1959) is a Virginia Circuit Court judge in the Fourth Judicial Circuit. Formerly a lawyer in private practice in Norfolk, substitute judge in that court for 16 years and Democratic politician, he represented (part-time) the 90th district in the Virginia House of Delegates from 2014 until November 15, 2020, when he resigned to accept the judicial appointment; fellow Democrat Angelia Williams Graves succeeded to the seat.

== Early life and education ==
Born in Norfolk, Lindsey graduated from Booker T. Washington High School before attending the Hampton Institute. After receiving a B.A. in political science in 1981, he went to Washington, D.C. to study law, and received a J.D. from American University in 1984.

== Career ==
Lindsey had a general legal practice in Norfolk, and his district encompassed part of Norfolk and part of Virginia Beach. He won the 2014 special election to succeed retiring incumbent Algie Howell. Voters have since re-elected Lindsey (who faced no opponents in 2015, 2017 and 2019). In the 2020 session, a bill which Lindsey had proposed allowing judges to inform juries of the range of criminal sentences passed and was signed into law by Governor Ralph Northam on March 4, 2020.

Lindsey served as the Chair of the Privileges and Elections Committee.

== Personal life ==
Judge Lindsey and his wife of 28 years, Rhoda, have two children, Ashley and Jason.
