= Elizabeth Robinson Abbott =

American educator

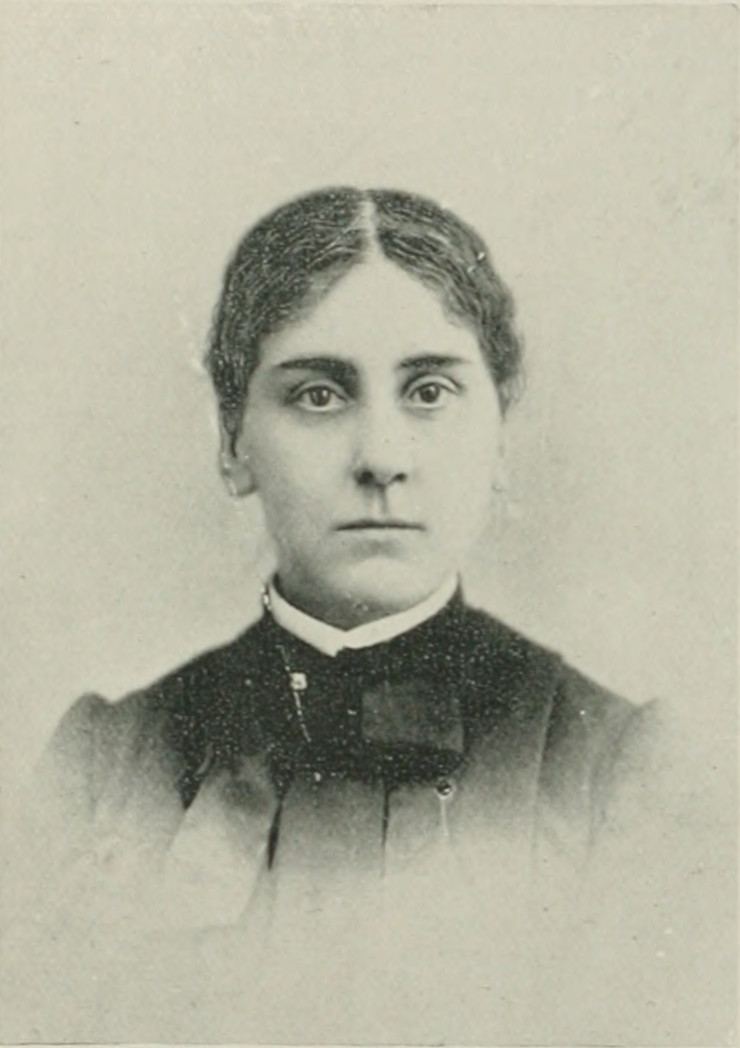
- "A woman of the century"
- Born: Elizabeth Osborne Robinson; September 11, 1852; Lowell, Massachusetts
- Died: September 27, 1926 (aged 74); Malden, Massachusetts
- Occupation: Kindergarten teacher

Elizabeth Robinson Abbott (September 11, 1852 – September 27, 1926) was an American educator considered to be a pioneer in introducing kindergarten to Connecticut.

== Biography ==
The daughter of William Stevens Robinson and Harriet Hanson, she was born Elizabeth Osborne Robinson in Lowell, Massachusetts. Her sister, Hattie, served as assistant clerk of the Massachusetts House of Representatives in 1872, being the first woman to hold such a position.

She taught at a district school in Maine and ran a small private school. She also worked at typesetting for a while but found that the pay for women in that field was not very good. She then began working as a cook in a charity kindergarten and nursery in Boston; she was allowed to take classes which eventually allowed her to teach kindergarten. She began teaching at a charity summer school in Boston and then taught in Waterbury, Connecticut. In 1885, she married George S. Abbott. She continued to teach and later operated a kindergarten out of her home. She served as secretary of the Connecticut Valley Kindergarten Association. Abbott also helped found the Old and New woman's club in Malden, Massachusetts and was the main founder for the Woman's Club of Waterbury.

Abbott and her husband later moved into her family's home in Malden. She used a wheelchair for the last eleven years of her life and died in Malden at the age of 74.
