= Virginia State Board of Education =

The Virginia State Board of Education is an independent board established by the commonwealth of Virginia in the United States which helps set state elementary and secondary educational policy, advocates within state government for elementary and secondary education, administers some state educational programs, and regulates the teaching profession in the state.

== About the board ==
The Virginia state constitution gives the state legislature, the Virginia General Assembly, the primary governing role over public education in the state. Thus, the state board of education is merely an administrative agency which carries out the laws, policies, and programs established by the legislature.

The board's duties include:

- Establishing a statewide curriculum;
- Establishing high school graduation requirements;
- Establishing educational and certification requirements for teachers, principals, and other education personnel;
- Establishing state educational assessment programs, including those for the federally required No Child Left Behind Act;
- Accrediting local schools and school districts;
- Accrediting teacher and school administration education programs;
- Implementing federal education assistance programs, and ensuring that schools make reporting requirements under these programs; and
- Acting as a rulemaking body to implement state educational programs.

=== Leadership ===
The board is composed of nine members, who are appointed by the Governor of Virginia and must be confirmed by the General Assembly. Members serve for four years, and may serve only two consecutive terms.

The board elects a president and vice president every year, with terms running from July 1 to June 30. Lieutenant Governor Winsome Earle-Sears served as vice president of the board from 2014 to 2015.

== Founding ==
The Virginia State Board of Education was founded in 1810 when the state of Virginia established a "literary fund" (designed to fund public education throughout the state) and the board of education (at the time, called the Board of Trustees of the Literary Fund) placed in charge of it. The state constitution of 1869 not only significantly revamped the state's system of elementary and secondary education, but also established a state Superintendent of Education and a new State Board of Education to replace the old "trustees". In 1901, yet another new Virginia constitution expanded the board's members from three to eight, and greatly expanded its powers. In 1910, local agricultural schools were placed under the board's control.

== Bibliography ==
- Monroe, Paul. A Cyclopedia of Education. New York: Macmillan, 1913.
- Russo, Charles J. and Mawdsley, Ralph D. Education Law. New York, N.Y.: Law Journal Press, 2002.
