= Freeman G. Teed =

American politician (1851–1916)

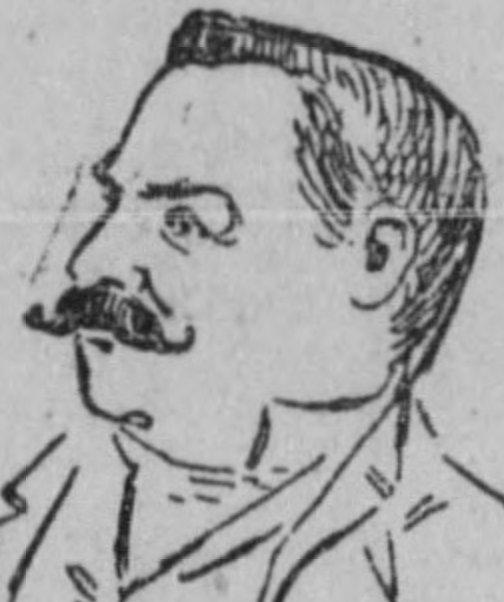
- Drawing of Teed in 1894

Los Angeles City Auditor
- In office December 13, 1886 – December 10, 1888
- Preceded by: William Whipple Robinson
- Succeeded by: M. F. Stiles

President of the Los Angeles City Council
- In office December 12, 1892 – December 16, 1896

Member of the Los Angeles City Council from the 5th ward
- In office December 12, 1892 – December 16, 1896
- Preceded by: John Q. Tufts
- Succeeded by: Charles Hulbert Toll

Personal details
- Born: July 14, 1851 Wilkes-Barre, Pennsylvania
- Died: August 3, 1916 (aged 65) Los Angeles, California
- Party: Republican

Freeman Golding Teed (July 14, 1851 – August 3, 1916) was Los Angeles, California, city auditor from 1886 until 1888. He was a member of the City Council in 1892–94, elected from the 5th Ward and chosen by the council as its president.

== Life and career ==
Teed was a member of the Jonathan Club and the Sons of the American Revolution. He was the first potentate of Los Angeles's Al Malaikah Temple of the Order of the Shrine, and it was he who suggested the name for the temple, meaning "The Angels." In 1900 Teed was secretary of the Sixth District Agricultural Association, which had charge of Agricultural Park.

In 1898 he was stamp clerk in the revenue department for Los Angeles for the Collector of Internal Revenue. In the same year, he was named by Fred Eaton of the Republican City Central Committee as one of the committee members who would meet with other organizations to "take preliminary steps toward the framing of a new city charter."

He died at California Hospital in Los Angeles on August 3, 1916, "after a prolonged illness," Teed left $4,000 for the purchase of a pipe organ for Los Angeles Commandery, No. 9, Knights Templar, to be known as the Teed Memorial Organ.

Preceded by William Whipple Robinson	Los Angeles City Auditor; 1886—1888	Succeeded by M. F. Stiles
