= John S. Edwards (Virginia politician) =

American politician and lawyer

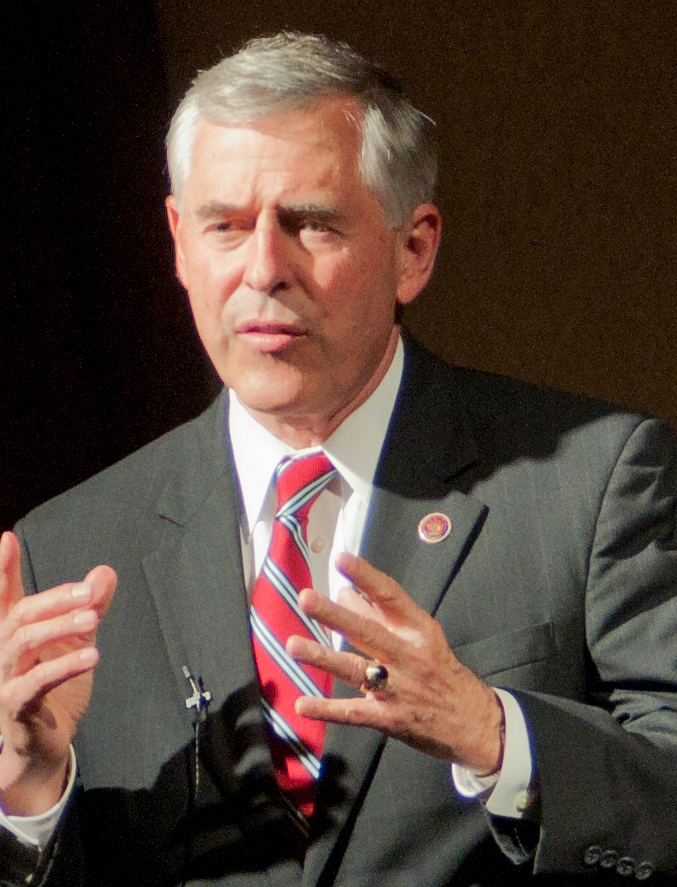

Member of the Virginia Senate from the 21st district
- In office January 10, 1996 – January 10, 2024
- Preceded by: Brandon Bell
- Succeeded by: Dave Suetterlein (Redistricting)

United States Attorney for the Western District of Virginia
- In office January 29, 1980 – January 1981
- Appointed by: Jimmy Carter
- Preceded by: E. Montgomery Tucker
- Succeeded by: John P. Alderman

Personal details
- Born: John Saul Edwards; October 6, 1943 (age 82) Roanoke, Virginia, U.S.
- Party: Democratic
- Spouse: Cathye Dabney
- Education: Princeton University (A.B.); University of Virginia (J.D.)
- Profession: Attorney
- Committees: Judiciary (Chair); Commerce and Labor; Education and Health; Finance and Appropriations; Rules

Military service
- Allegiance: United States
- Branch/service: United States Marine Corps
- Years of service: 1971–1973
- Rank: Captain
- Unit: Judge Advocate Division

John Saul Edwards (born October 6, 1943) is an American politician and lawyer. He served a member of the Senate of Virginia, representing the 21st district from 1996 to 2024.

== Early life and education ==
Edwards graduated from Patrick Henry High School in 1962, where he was president of the Student Government Association, a state champion pole vaulter, and voted by his classmates as "most likely to succeed." In 1992, he was inducted into the school's Sports Hall of Fame.

He graduated cum laude with an A.B. in history from Princeton University in 1966 after completing a senior thesis titled "The Making of the Marshall Plan." While a student at Princeton, Edwards was a pole vaulter on the track team.

He then attended the Union Theological Seminary in the City of New York on a Rockefeller Brothers Theological Fellowship (1966–67) but withdrew to attend law school.

Edwards graduated from the University of Virginia School of Law (J.D. 1970), where he was a member of the Law Review and elected to Omicron Delta Kappa and the Raven Society. He served as vice-chairman of the University Judiciary Committee and as assistant to Professor Antonin Scalia, later justice of the U.S. Supreme Court.

== Military service ==
Edwards served in the United States Marine Corps from 1971 to 1973 as a Judge Advocate General, attaining the rank of captain. He volunteered for the Far East and served with the First Marine Aircraft Wing in Japan and Okinawa and later with the second Marine Division at Camp LeJeune, North Carolina.

== Legal career ==
In 1980, President Jimmy Carter appointed Edwards United States Attorney for the Western District of Virginia. During his term, Edwards's office achieved several milestones. The Roanoke Times & World News reported that he had one of the "perhaps most successful tenures of any federal prosecutor in recent years." He prosecuted the largest criminal case in the country at the time under the Mine Safety and Health Act of 1977, prosecuted the first criminal civil rights case in Virginia, initiated a national investigation into public corruption in the Mine Safety and Health Administration, prosecuted the largest bank robbery in Virginia history, and prosecuted organized crime. His office also received recognition from the Department of Justice for increasing by several times the collection of monies owed the federal government. He is the author of "Professional Responsibilities of the Federal Prosecutor," 17 U. Rich. L. Rev. 511 (1983).

Edwards is a partner in his law firm. His law practice includes a broad range of civil and criminal litigation in federal and state courts, including trials and appeals.

He has handled many appeals before the U.S. Court of Appeals for the 4th Circuit, including:

- ICC v. Baltimore & Annapolis Ry., 537 F.2d 77 (4th Cir. 1975);
- Pratt v. Kelley, 585 F.2d 692 (4th Cir. 1978);
- United States v. Johnson, 634 F.2d 735 (4th Cir. 1980);
- United States v. Fowler, 646 F.2d 859 (4th Cir. 1981);
- Rowland v. Marshall, 650 F.2d 28 (4th Cir. 1981);
- Williams v. United States, 667 F.2d 1108 (4th Cir. 1981);
- United States v. Steed, 674 F.2d 284 (4th Cir. 1982) (en banc);
- Carter v. Burch, 34 F.3d 257 (4th Cir. 1994);
- Ford Motor Credit Co. v. Dobbins, 35 F.3d 860 (4th Cir. 1994); and
- Zeran v. America Online, 129 F.3d 327 (4th Cir. 1997).

He has handled many appeals before the Supreme Court of Virginia, including:

- Foti v. Cook, 220 Va. 800 (1978);
- Kesler v. Allen, 233 Va. 130 (1987);
- Brown v. Haley, 233 Va. 210 (1987);
- Stone Printing & Mfg. Co. v. Dogan, 234 Va. 163 (1987);
- Smith v. Credico Industrial Loan Co., 234 Va. 514 (1987);
- Ballard v. McCoy, 247 Va. 513 (1994);
- Curo v. Becker, 254 Va. 486 (1997);
- Runion v. Helvestine, 256 Va. 1 (1998);
- Correll v. Commonwealth, 269 Va. 3, 591 S.E.2d 712 (2004);
- Gray v. Green, Va. (2005) (unreported); and
- Browning v. East, Va. (2009) (unreported).

== Political career ==
In November 1993, Edwards was appointed to fill a vacancy on Roanoke City Council. In the May 1994 general election, he was elected to a four-year term and Vice-Mayor of the City of Roanoke. Edwards was named Roanoker magazine's Roanoker of the Year in 1995.

In November 1995, Edwards unseated a Republican incumbent to win a seat in the Senate of Virginia, representing the 21st District. Edwards was re-elected in 1999, 2003, 2007, 2011, and 2015 to the Virginia Senate. He currently serves on the following Senate committees: Courts of Justice, Privileges and Elections, and Transportation.

Edwards serves on the Virginia War Memorial Foundation Board, the Virginia Indigent Defense Commission, the Virginia Capital Representation Resource Center Board, and the Virginia Commission of At-Risk Youth & Children. He is Chairman of the Virginia Code Commission and serves on the board of governors of the Virginia Bar Association.

Legislation that Edwards has successfully sponsored include:

- establishing the Roanoke Higher Education Center, which he Chairs;
- requiring Character Education to be taught in the public schools;
- requiring coverage for pre-existing health conditions for persons changing individual health-insurance carriers;
- establishing the Health Practitioners' Intervention Program;
- establishing the Virginia Department of Veterans Services; and
- adopting the Virginia Rules of Evidence for use in the state's courts.

Awards and accolades that Edwards has received for his legislative service include:

- Public Service Award from Virginia Association of Nonprofit Homes for the Aging (VANHA) (1997);
- Roanoke Mental Health Professional Community award (1997);
- "Legislator of the Year" from the Virginia Legal Service program (1998);
- Roanoke Fire Fighters Association award (1998);
- Public Service Award from Alliance for the Mentally Ill of the Roanoke Valley (1999);
- "Legislator of the Year" award from the Virginia Interfaith Center for Public Policy (1999);
- "Profile in Courage Award" from the Coalition of Labor Union Women, Western Virginia Chapter (1999);
- "Child Advocate of the Year" award from the Virginia PTA/PTSA (2002);
- "Legislative Hero" from the Virginia League of Conservation Voters (2003 and 2011);
- "Friend of the Family" award from the Virginia Association of Family and Consumer Services (2003);
- "Public Servant Award" by Equality Virginia (2005);
- Legislator of the Year from Child Health Investment Partnership (CHIP) (2005);
- Virginia First Cities Excellence Award for sponsoring Constitutional Amendment (2006);
- "Child Advocate Award" from Virginia Chapter, American Academy of Pediatrics (2007);
- Public Service Award from Southwest Virginia Psychiatric Society (2008);
- Public Service Award from Virginia Conference, American Association of University Professors (2009);
- Public Service Award from the Madison Society of Virginia Western Community College (2009);
- The Stamp Award for Exemplary Support of Military Families from The Virginia Council of Chapters, Military Officers Association of America (2009);
- Co-Legislator of the Year from the Democratic Latino Organization of Virginia (2011);
- Legislative Champion Award from the Virginia Crisis Intervention Team Coalition (2011);
- Legislator of the Year Award from the Professional Firefighters Association (2012);
- Legislative Service Award from Planned Parenthood of Virginia (2012);
- named a "Leader in the Law" by Virginia Law Weekly (2012); and
- Legislator of the Year Award from the Sierra Club of Virginia (2013).

Edwards ran for Attorney General of Virginia in 2001. He finished second to Donald McEachin in a four-way Democratic primary.

=== Political positions ===
==== Gun control ====
Edwards has voted multiple times against Castle Doctrine bills. In January 2011, Edwards voted against Senate Bill 876 (Castle Doctrine) which would have allowed "a lawful occupant use of physical force, including deadly force, against an intruder in his dwelling who has committed an overt act against him, without civil liability." In February 2011, Edwards was one of eight senators on the Senate Courts of Justice Committee who "passed by indefinitely" House Bill 1573, defeating the bill by an 8 to 4 margin.

In February 2020, Edwards broke party ranks to shelve House Bill 961 (gun control) which would have prohibited the sale and transport of assault firearms, certain firearm magazines, silencers, and trigger activators. This effectively blocked the legislation championed by Gov. Ralph Northam.

==== Criminal justice reform ====
Edwards is the sponsor of a bill which would repeal Virginia's ban on parole, which dates back to 1995.

== Notes ==
Senate of Virginia
Preceded by Brandon Bell	Member of the Virginia Senate from the 21st district 1996–2024	Succeeded by Angelia Graves
