= Heroes of Thailand =

Song about the Tham Luang cave rescue

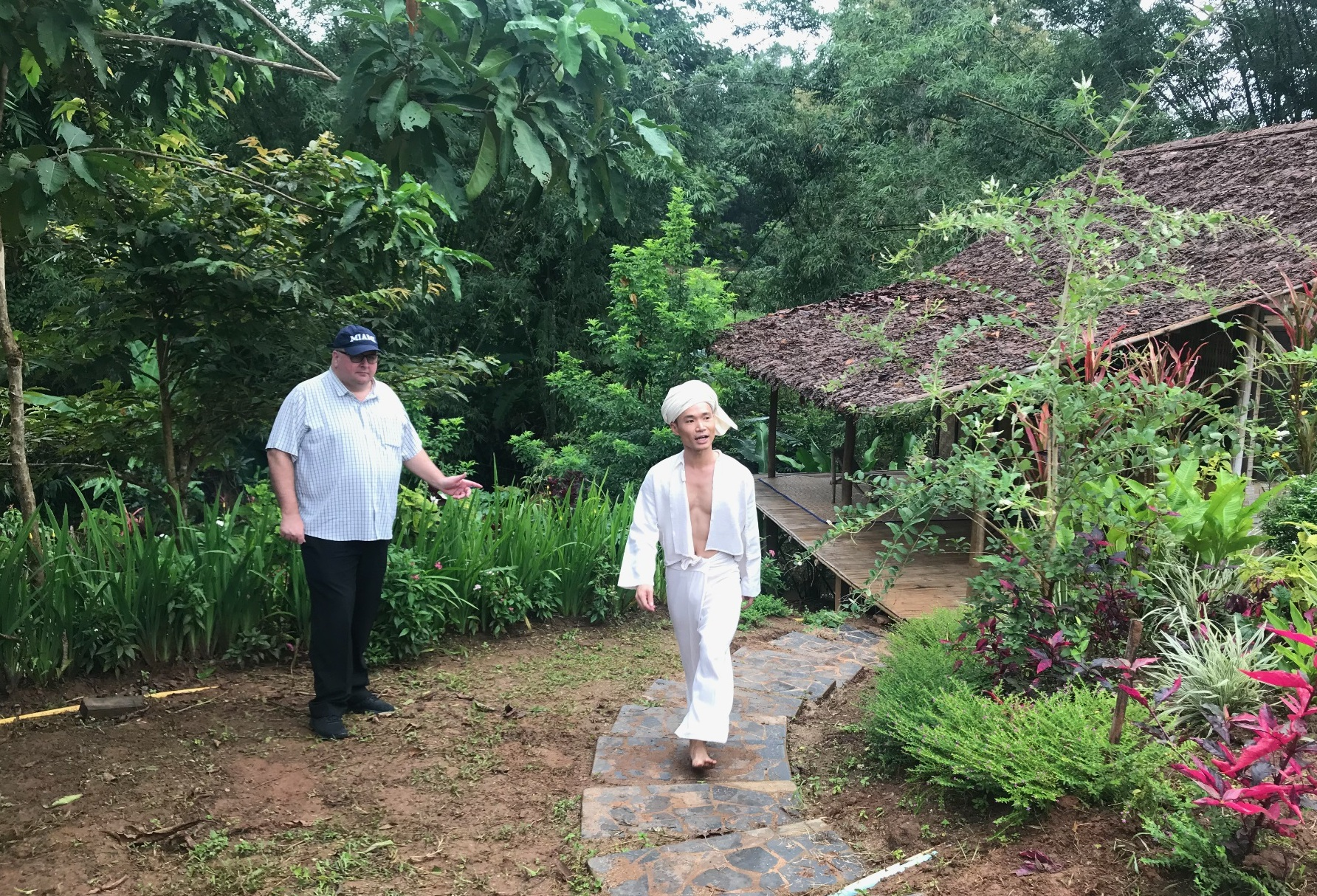
Heroes of Thailand screenshot

"Heroes of Thailand" is a song about the Tham Luang cave rescue in Chiang Rai, Thailand in 2018. The song was written about the divers and rescue workers who came from across the world to rescue the football team and their coach, who were stuck in the cave for two weeks.

The song was written by British music producer Will Robinson and Daniel Ryan. Robinson's supporters included the Thai Navy Seals, British cave hero Vern Unsworth, ITV, Thai PBS, rescue workers including the Wild Boar Committee, Happy Radio Chiang Mai, the drummer from The James Brown Band Erik Hargrove, and vocalist Ronnarong Khampha. The video was recorded in Mae Sai and Chiang Dao in Thailand, with proceeds of sales going to Childlife Mae Sai.
