= Angelia Williams Graves =

American politician from Virginia

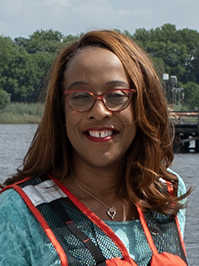
- Graves in 2025

Member of the Virginia Senate from the 21st district
- Incumbent
- Assumed office January 10, 2024
- Preceded by: John Edwards (redistricting)

Member of the Virginia House of Delegates from the 90th district
- In office January 13, 2021 – January 10, 2024
- Preceded by: Joseph Lindsey
- Succeeded by: Jackie Glass (Redistricting)

Personal details
- Born: Angelia Marie Williams
- Party: Democratic
- Spouse: Tommy Graves
- Children: 2
- Committees: Public Safety; Counties Cities and Towns; Agriculture Chesapeake and Natural Resources
- Website: Campaign website

Angelia Williams Graves is an American politician who has served as a Democratic member for the 21st district in the Virginia Senate since 2024. She previously represented 90th district in the Virginia House of Delegates from 2021 to 2024.

== Biography ==
Graves obtained an Associate Degree in Business Administration from Tidewater Community College. She would then go on to obtain a Bachelor's Degree in marketing from Old Dominion University.

== Political career ==
=== 2010 ===
Graves first entered politics in 2010 running for Norfolk City Council's Super Ward 7. Graves would win the election with 40% of the vote. She would be re-elected again in 2012, 2016, and 2020. Graves would also serve as vice-mayor from 2013 to 2016.

=== 2021 ===
On November 19, 2020, Graves announced her plan to run for the 90th district in the Virginia House of Delegates following the resignation of Delegate Joseph C. Lindsey to become a judge in the Norfolk General District Court. Graves would defeat Rick James for the Democratic nomination in a firehouse primary. She would go on and defeat Republican Sylvia Bryant in the special election.

== Election history ==
2010 Norfolk City Council Superward 7
Party	Candidate	Votes	%
Independent	Angelia M. Williams	7,883	40
Independent	Phillip Hawkins Jr.	5,149	26.1
Independent	Earl P. Fraley Jr.	4,311	21.9
Independent	Jimmie D. Wilson	2,216	11.3%

2012 Norfolk City Council Superward 7
Party	Candidate	Votes	%
Independent	Angelia Marie Williams	2,620	69.9
Independent	Sonya Lee Smith	1,100	29.3

2016 Norfolk City Council Superward 7
Party	Candidate	Votes	%
Independent	Angelia Williams Graves	7,673	58.3
Independent	G. W. Billy Cook Jr.	4,217	32
Independent	Kendrick Juvill Turner	618	4.7
Independent	Harry David Candela	611	4.6

2020 Norfolk City Council Superward 7
Party	Candidate	Votes	%
Independent	Angelia Williams Graves	5,492	97.6
Write-In	Others	137	2.4

2021 90th House of Delegates District special election
Party	Candidate	Votes	%
Democrat	Angelia Williams Graves	3,691	63.5
Republican	Sylvia Bryant	2,114	36.4

Virginia House of Delegates
Preceded by Joseph Lindsey	Member of the Virginia House of Delegates from the 90th district 2021–2024	Succeeded by Cliff Hayes Jr.
Senate of Virginia
Preceded by John Edwards	Member of the Virginia Senate from the 21st district 2024–Present	Incumbent
