= Winsome Earle-Sears =

American politician (born 1964)

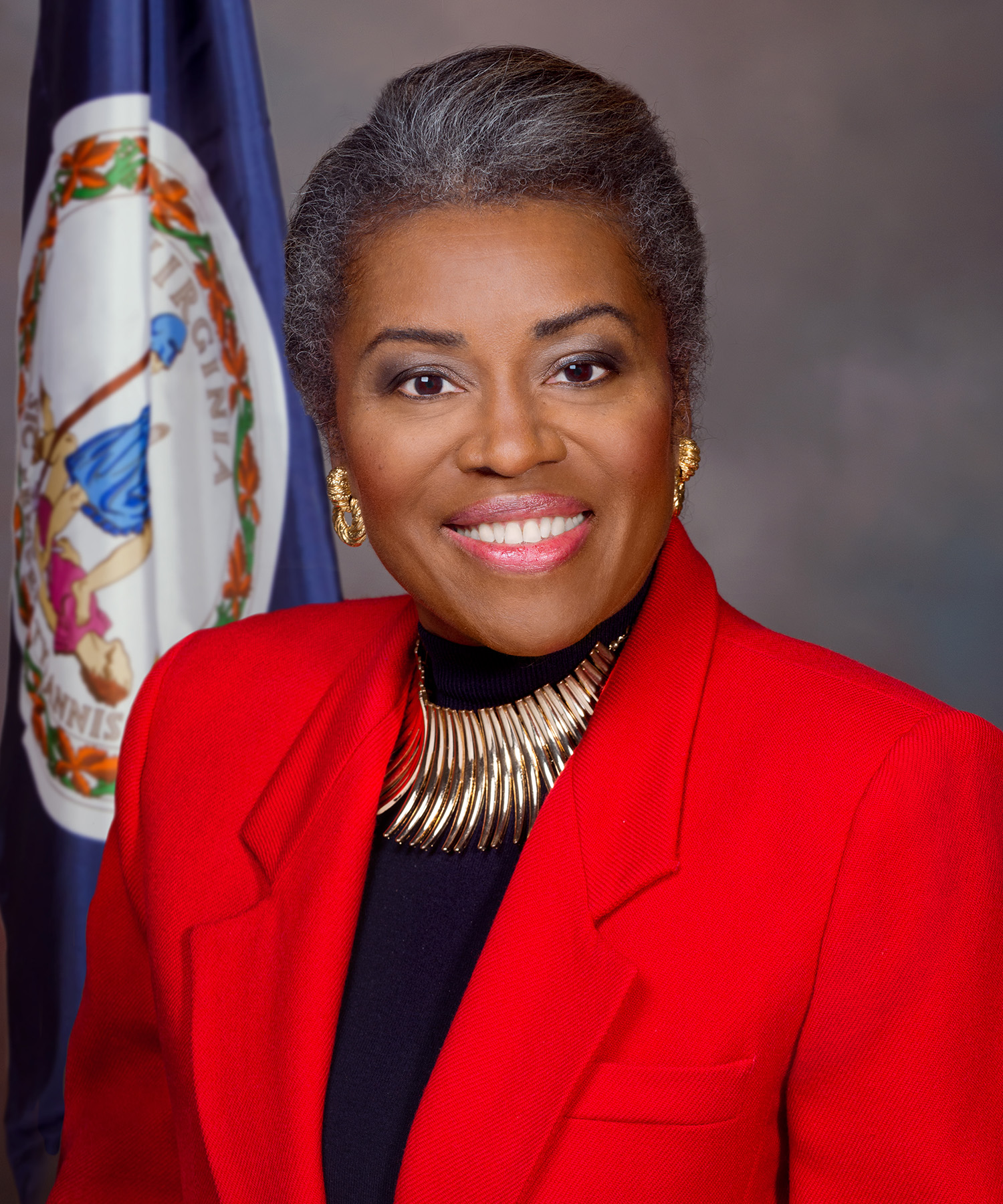
- Official portrait, 2022

42nd Lieutenant Governor of Virginia
- In office January 15, 2022 – January 17, 2026
- Governor: Glenn Youngkin
- Preceded by: Justin Fairfax
- Succeeded by: Ghazala Hashmi

Member of the Virginia Board of Education
- In office 2011–2015
- Governor: Bob McDonnell; Terry McAuliffe
- Preceded by: Ella Ward
- Succeeded by: Wes Bellamy

Member of the Virginia House of Delegates from the 90th district
- In office January 13, 2002 – January 14, 2004
- Preceded by: Billy Robinson
- Succeeded by: Algie Howell

Personal details
- Born: Winsome Earle; March 11, 1964 (age 62) Kingston, Jamaica
- Party: Republican (1988–present)
- Other political affiliations: Democratic (before 1988)
- Spouse: Terence Sears (m. 1986)
- Children: 3
- Education: Tidewater Community College (AA); Old Dominion University (BA); Regent University (MA)
- Website: Campaign website

Military service
- Branch: United States Marine Corps
- Service years: 1983–1986
- Rank: Corporal

Winsome Earle-Sears (born March 11, 1964) is a Jamaican–American politician and businesswoman who served as the 42nd lieutenant governor of Virginia from 2022 to 2026. A member of the Republican Party, she represented the 90th district in the Virginia House of Delegates from 2002 to 2004.

Born in Jamaica, Earle-Sears immigrated to the United States in 1970. She served in the U.S. Marine Corps from 1983 to 1986. Running for Virginia's 3rd congressional district in 2004, Earle-Sears lost to Democratic incumbent Bobby Scott. She then owned and operated a small business until it closed during the COVID-19 pandemic. Earle-Sears was a member of the Virginia State Board of Education from 2011 to 2015, serving as vice president of the board from 2014 to 2015. In 2018, she unsuccessfully ran for U.S. Senate as a write-in candidate.

In the 2025 Virginia gubernatorial election, Earle-Sears lost to former U.S. representative and Democratic nominee Abigail Spanberger.

== Early life and education ==
Earle-Sears was born in Kingston, Jamaica, on March 11, 1964. She immigrated to the United States at the age of six, brought by her father who had already immigrated to the U.S. She grew up in The Bronx, New York City.

Earle-Sears earned an Associate of Arts degree from Tidewater Community College, a Bachelor of Arts in English with a minor in economics from Old Dominion University, and a Master of Arts in organizational leadership from Regent University.

Earle-Sears served as an electrician in the United States Marines from 1983 to 1986. She received training at Camp Lejeune, and was then stationed at Camp Pendleton; during her military service, she was promoted to corporal, and also became a U.S. citizen. Before running for public office, she directed a Salvation Army homeless shelter.

== Business career ==
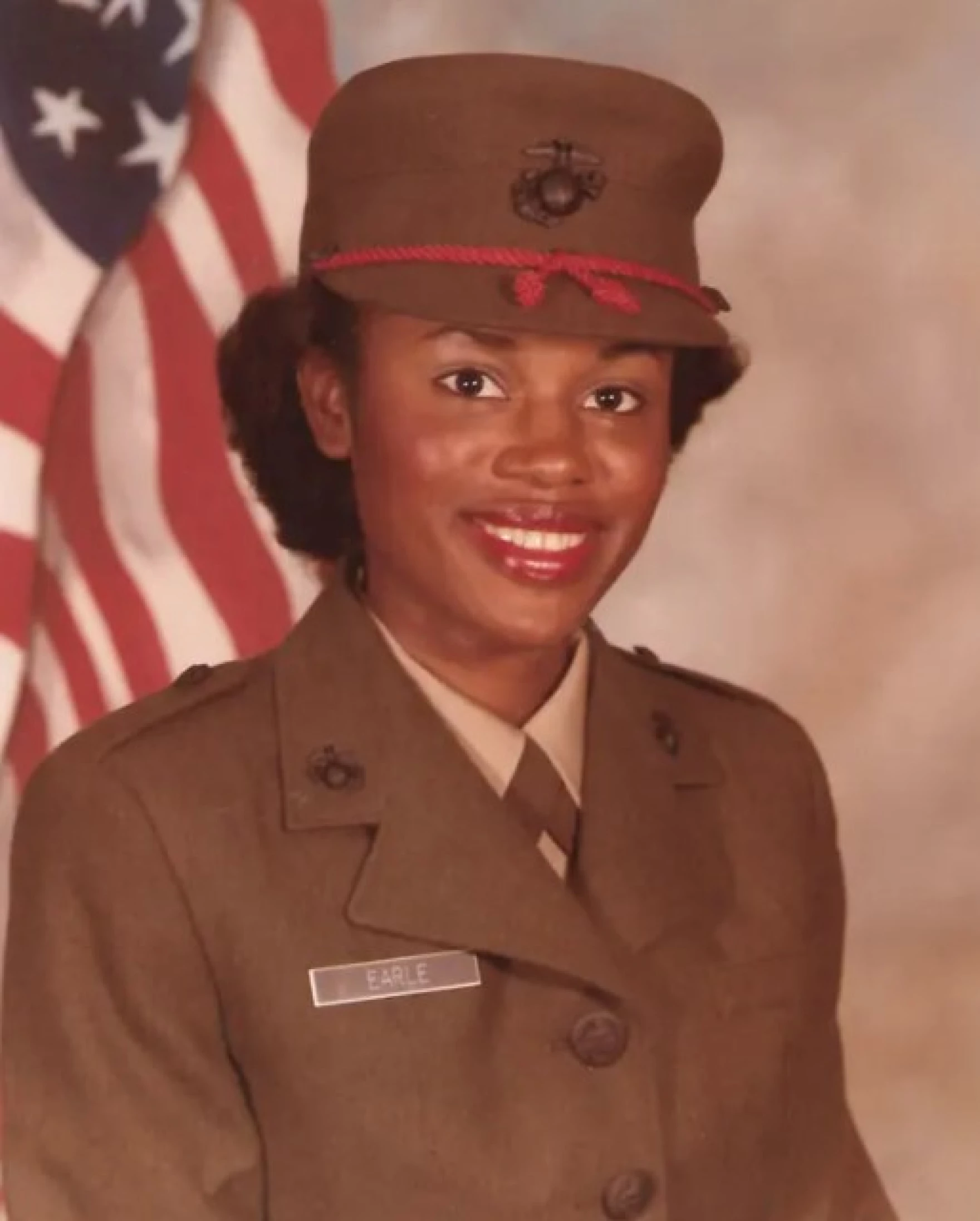
Earle-Sears (then Earle) while serving in the U.S. Marine Corps, c. 1983–1986

From 2010 to 2020, Earle-Sears owned Shenandoah Alliance, Plumbing, and Electric. While the business was profitable during the 2008 recession, Earle-Sears closed it during the COVID-19 pandemic. Earle-Sears blamed the government’s response to the pandemic, along with staffing challenges, for its closure. The business received over $102,000 in Paycheck Protection Program loans; the loans were forgiven.

== Political career ==
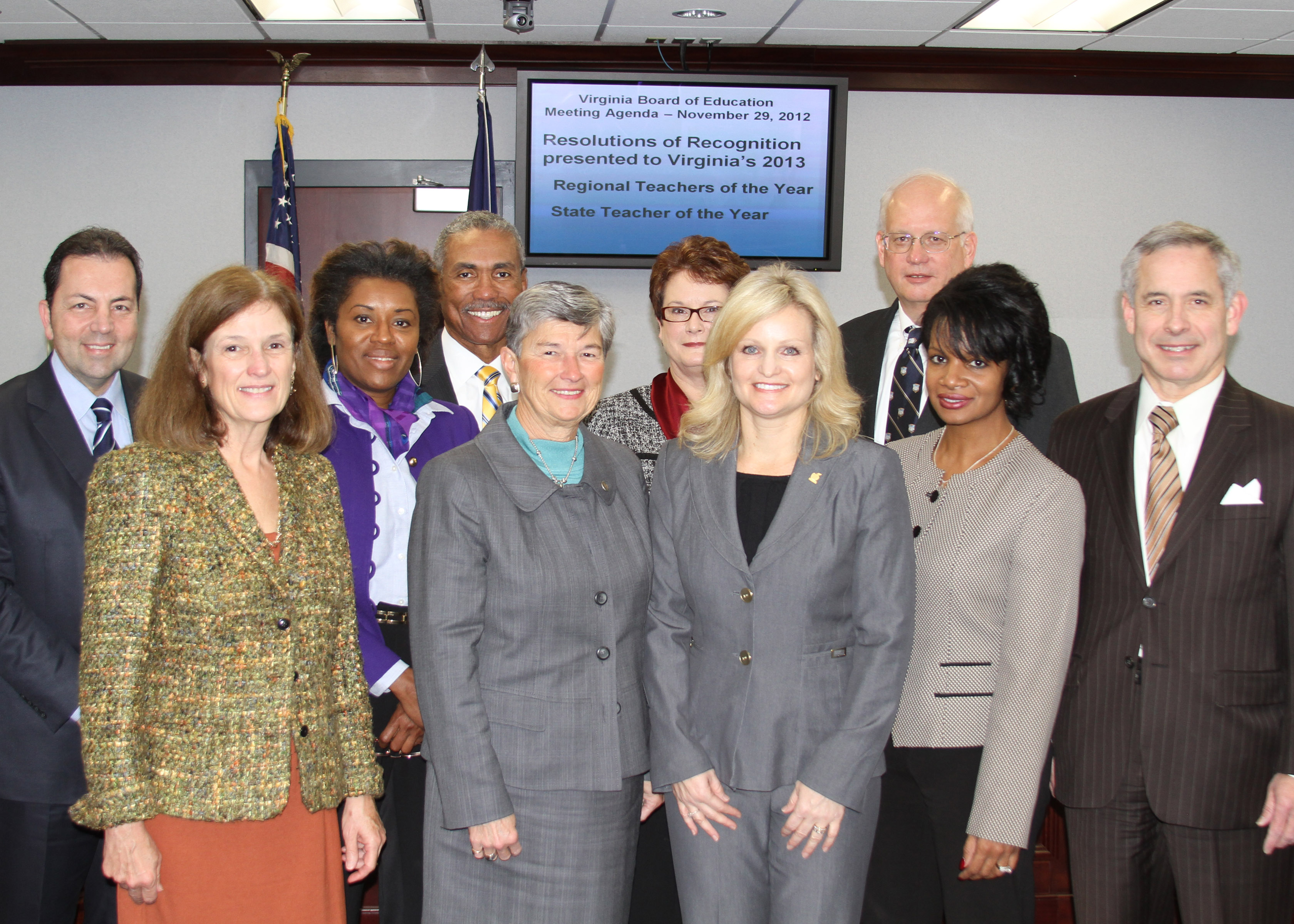
Earle-Sears at a 2013 Virginia Board of Education meeting

In November 2001, Earle-Sears upset 20-year Democratic incumbent Billy Robinson in the general election for the 90th district seat in the Virginia House of Delegates, becoming the first female Black Republican, the first female veteran, and the first naturalized citizen to serve in the body. She is the first Republican to represent a majority-Black House district in Virginia since 1865. Sears received a presidential appointment to the United States Census Bureau's African American Committee and a separate appointment from the secretary of veterans affairs to the Advisory Committee on Women Veterans.

In 2004, Earle-Sears was the Republican nominee for Virginia's 3rd congressional district, challenging Democratic incumbent Bobby Scott. She lost in this heavily Democratic district, receiving 31% of the vote.

In 2011, Governor Bob McDonnell appointed Earle-Sears to the Virginia Board of Education, succeeding Ella Ward. She served as the board's vice president in 2014, succeeding Betsy Beamer. Earle-Sears was succeeded as vice president by Billy K. Cannaday Jr. In 2015, Earle-Sears retired from the board and was succeeded by Wes Bellamy.

In September 2018, Earle-Sears ran as a write-in candidate for the US Senate after Corey Stewart won the Republican nomination, citing his past alliances with white nationalists and other racial controversies. She received less than 1% of the vote.

During the 2020 United States presidential election campaign, Earle-Sears supported Donald Trump and served as the national chairwoman of the political action committee Black Americans to Re-elect the President.

Following the 2022 United States elections, during which Trump-endorsed Republicans lost in critical battleground states, Earle-Sears criticized Trump, calling him a liability for the party and saying she would not support him running again in the 2024 United States presidential election. Earle-Sears later changed her position, announcing her support after Trump was named the presumptive nominee in 2024.

=== Lieutenant Governor of Virginia (2022–2026) ===
==== 2021 election ====
On January 21, 2021, Earle-Sears announced her candidacy for Lieutenant Governor of Virginia.

On May 11, 2021, Earle-Sears won the Republican nomination for lieutenant governor of Virginia on the fifth ballot, defeating former state delegate Tim Hugo 54% to 46%. On November 2, she won the general election, defeating Hala Ayala. Her victory coincided with victories from gubernatorial nominee Glenn Youngkin and attorney general nominee Jason Miyares. She was inaugurated as the 42nd lieutenant governor of Virginia on January 15, 2022. She is Virginia's first female lieutenant governor, as well as the first Black female to hold the office.

During her 2021 campaign, Earle-Sears declined to say whether she had been vaccinated against SARS-CoV-2, but encouraged others to get vaccinated.

==== Tenure ====
On February 10, 2022, Earle-Sears cast her first tiebreaking Senate vote as lieutenant governor. The Senate voted 20-20 on a bill that would have let defendants in many felony cases appeal discretionary sentences in situations when a judge has not provided a satisfactory written explanation of the sentence. After conferring with the bill's sponsor and with one of the bill's opponents, Earle-Sears voted against the bill.

In June 2022, Earle-Sears cast a tie-breaking vote in the Senate to allow Governor Glenn Youngkin's proposal to extend lab-school status and funding eligibility to community colleges and private schools.

In 2024, the Virginia legislature passed HB 174. The bill stated that no one who is empowered to issue a marriage license may decline to issue a license based only on the gender, sex, or race of the parties. Governor Glenn Youngkin signed the legislation. In her role as presiding officer of the Virginia Senate, Earle-Sears was constitutionally required to affix her signature to the bill. While she did sign it, she added the following note: "As the Lt. Governor, I recognize and respect my constitutional obligations to the procedures laid out in the Constitution of Virginia. However, I remain morally opposed to the content of HB 174 as passed by the General Assembly."

On January 28, 2025, Earle-Sears cast a tie-breaking vote against a bill to establish a right to contraceptives. The bill was later voted on by the Senate again and passed.

In 2025, the Virginia legislature gave first passage to a proposed constitutional amendment that would guarantee abortion rights. Sears affixed her signature to the amendment but added the following note: "I am morally opposed to this bill; no protection for the child."

=== 2025 Virginia gubernatorial election ===
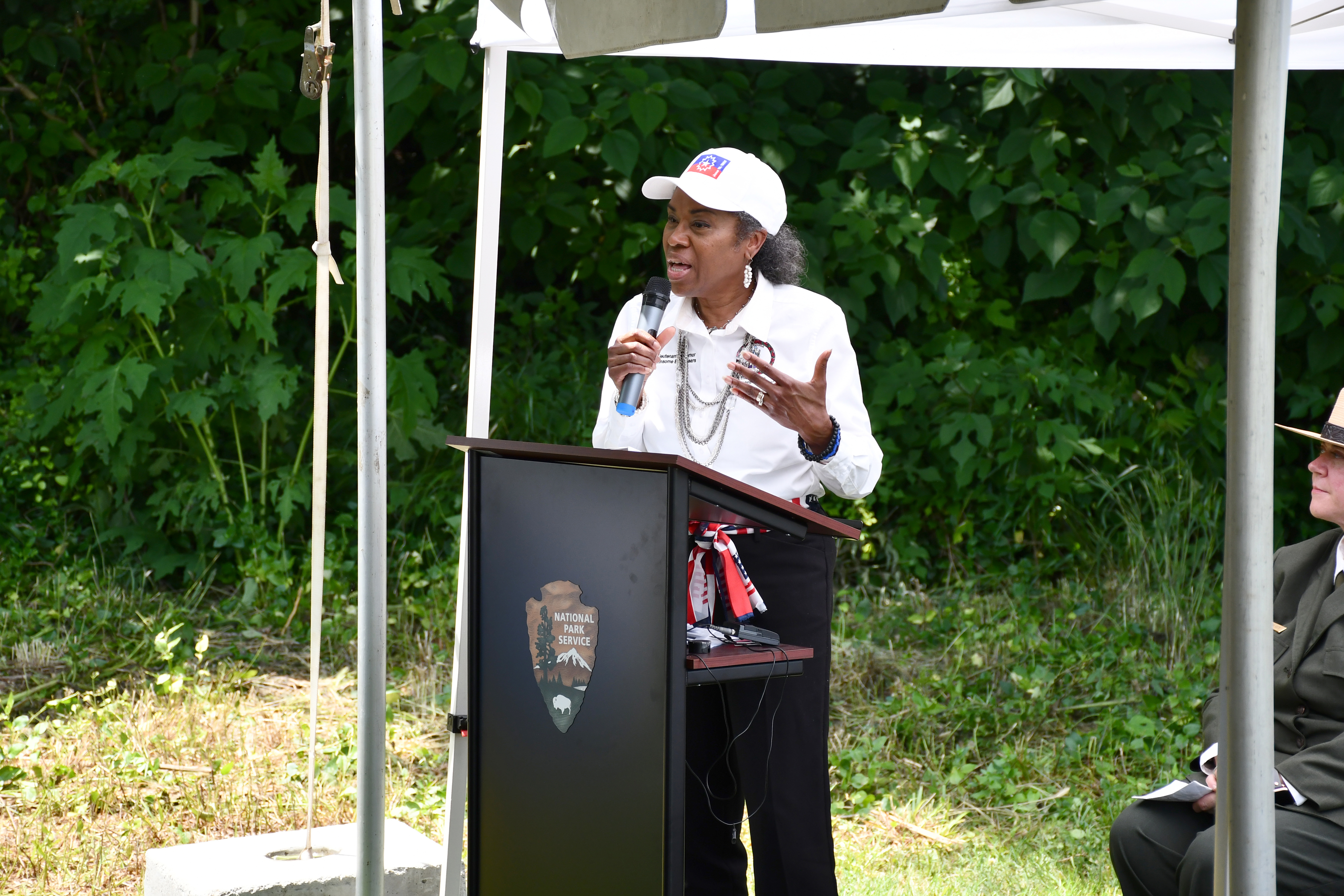
Winsome Earle-Sears speaking at Petersburg National Battlefield.

On September 5, 2024, Earle-Sears declared her candidacy for governor of Virginia in the 2025 Virginia gubernatorial election. After Virginia Attorney General Jason Miyares announced on November 18, 2024, that he would not run for governor, Earle-Sears was viewed as the presumptive Republican nominee.

On February 28, 2025, due to Earle-Sears' previous criticisms of President Trump, former state senator Amanda Chase and former state delegate Dave LaRock each announced that they would run against her in the Republican primary. Despite this opposition, Earle-Sears was still viewed as the favorite to win the primary. In March 2025, Earle-Sears' campaign stated, "Challengers can enter the race, but the outcome will be the same — victory."

Ultimately, neither Chase nor LaRock reached the required number of signatures to qualify for the ballot. On April 5, 2025, Earle-Sears became the Republican nominee for governor.

While speaking at an Arlington County school board meeting to oppose the system's transgender locker room and bathroom policies, Earle-Sears was targeted by a racist sign in a crowd of protesters outside the venue. It read, "Hey Winsome, if trans [sic] can't share your bathroom, then Blacks can't share my water fountain." All six nominees for statewide office denounced the sign, with Earle-Sears's opponent, Abigail Spanberger, stating, "No matter how much one might find someone else's beliefs objectionable, to threaten a return of Jim Crow and segregation to a Black woman is unacceptable."

In August 2025, VPM News, a National Public Radio affiliate for the Greater Richmond Region, submitted a FOIA request for Earle-Sears's schedule and records, which are required to be kept and preserved permanently. Her office provided a mostly blank, 297-page PDF file, excluding about 297 records and citing exemptions for "confidential correspondence and working papers of the Office of the Lieutenant Governor". A follow-up FOIA submission clarifying and broadening the request went unanswered within the legally required time frame.

On November 4, Earle-Sears lost the general election to Spanberger, receiving 42.22% of the vote.

== Political positions ==
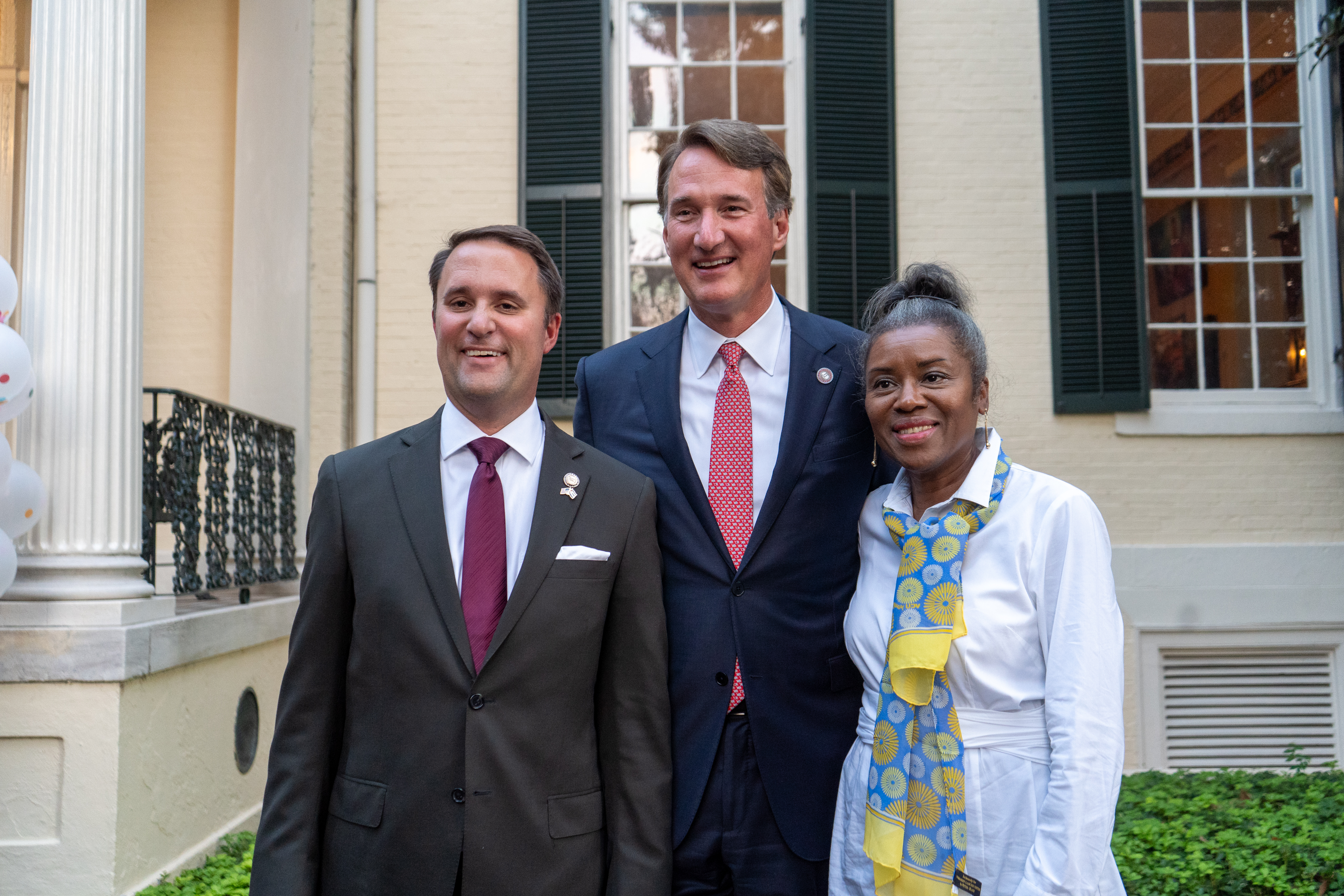
Earle-Sears with Virginia governor Glenn Youngkin and attorney general Jason Miyares at the Executive Mansion in 2023

Earle-Sears has been described as conservative.

=== Abortion ===
Earle-Sears opposes abortion. During her 2021 campaign for lieutenant governor, Earle-Sears stated she would support legislation similar to the Texas Heartbeat Act, which would ban abortion as soon as a fetal heartbeat is detected (i.e., as early as six weeks). On the campaign trail, she called abortion "genocide" and stated she supported making abortion illegal in all cases unless the mother's life was at risk. Later in her 2021 campaign, WRIC-TV wrote that Earle-Sears "appeared to backtrack" on her initial comments about the Texas Heartbeat Act. She told WRIC-TV she had not reviewed the Texas law and declined to specify when abortion should be banned. After becoming lieutenant governor, Earle-Sears said that abortion should be allowed in cases of rape, incest, and to prevent harm to pregnant women. When Roe v. Wade was overturned in Dobbs v. Jackson Women's Health Organization in June 2022, she announced her support for a 15-week abortion ban. Audio obtained by The Guardian captured Earle-Sears implying that consenting to sex is equivalent to consenting to pregnancy, saying that women "need to make our choices before we're pregnant, not, you know, after."

In 2025, Earle-Sears signed Virginia's pending constitutional amendment on reproductive rights while adding a handwritten note expressing her personal opposition to it.

=== Cannabis ===
In 2021, Earle-Sears expressed support for medical marijuana legalization but opposed the legalization of marijuana for recreational use. Earle-Sears has said that adult-use cannabis "will destroy us" and has described marijuana as a gateway drug. During her campaign in 2021, Earles-Sears stated that she fired one of her employees for using marijuana, saying "I had to let somebody go who worked for me, found out he was on marijuana, 'you can't work for me, you're gonna destroy somebody's home, you're gonna crash, it's gonna decimate us, because marijuana is a gateway drug … There is no hope in that, there is no future."

=== Diversity, equity, and inclusion ===
Earle-Sears applauded a decision by the University of Virginia to disband its DEI office in 2025, calling it a victory for both students and faculty. A WinRed fundraising appeal for her campaign quoted her as saying, "Democrats think minorities can't succeed without DEI".

=== Economy ===
In the Virginia House of Delegates, Earle-Sears was one of the two Republican state delegates who voted against a Republican-led attempt at raising taxes.

In 2022, Earle-Sears supported Youngkin's 90-day gas tax holiday proposal. During her gubernatorial run, she pledged to eliminate the car tax, and promised to eliminate taxes on tips at the state level.

Earle-Sears has supported Trump's tariffs, saying they will strengthen the U.S. economy. She also expressed her support for Trump's Department of Government Efficiency (DOGE) initiative to trim federal spending and reduce the size of the federal workforce.

=== Education ===
When Earle-Sears was appointed to the Virginia State Board of Education as vice president in 2011, she defended their efforts to enact race-based testing standards where Latino and Black students were given lower standards than white students.

Earle-Sears said critical race theory (CRT) was taught in the state's schools. She stated, "So I keep hearing that critical race theory is not taught in schools...They may not use the term critical race theory but it’s there. It's semantics and these word games help no one." She pointed to Loudoun County Public Schools' 2019 agreement with The Equity Collaborative, where she said consultants were trained to teach CRT to students. Loudoun County Public Schools denied her allegations: they stated their cooperation with The Equity Collaborative was for their schools' staff members — not the students. Earle-Sears supported Governor Youngkin's 'Executive Order One' which banned critical race theory in schools' curriculum and other executive orders which rolled back mask mandates and expanded 'parental rights'. Earle-Sears called critical race theory "racist" – believing "the good and bad of American history should be taught."

After the COVID-19 pandemic interrupted schooling in the state, Earle-Sears suggested the possibility of year-round school or longer school days to make up lost educational time. In an August 2021 interview with Virginia Mercury, Earle-Sears proposed increasing teachers' pay and allowing parents to send their children to charter, parochial, and charter schools if they desired to. Earle-Sears has also called for the opening of more lab schools and virtual schools in Virginia. Earle-Sears said critical race theory would "create moral problems for everybody" and she wanted to focus on transitioning schools from "labor-oriented" to "technology-driven."

As lieutenant governor, Earle-Sears supported "Education Excellence for All" which allows parents to take one-third of their child's education fund into the parents' education saving account (ESA) to spend for their child's education. During her 2025 gubernatorial campaign, Earle-Sears wrote an opinion piece on Virginia Scope which advocated for education reform by changing state education standards to national standards and making assessment results "accessible and understandable" for parents.

=== LGBT rights ===
During her 2004 congressional campaign, Earle-Sears expressed opposition to employment protections for LGBTQ people and to adoptions by same-sex couples. In a 2004 survey conducted by Public Advocate of the United States, a conservative organization, Earle-Sears described homosexuality as an "immoral lifestyle choice".

In March 2024, Earle-Sears signed HB 174, a law requiring officials to issue marriage licenses regardless of sex, gender, or race, but added a note saying she was "morally opposed" to same-sex marriage.

During her gubernatorial campaign, Earle-Sears stated that she opposed same-sex marriage but would follow U.S. Supreme Court precedent on that subject. She added that she did not object to civil unions.

In the 2025 gubernatorial debate, Democratic nominee Abigail Spanberger said that Earle-Sears had previously stated that same-sex couples should not be allowed to marry and that firing employees for being gay was acceptable. After both statements, Earle-Sears interrupted Spanberger and replied, "That's not discrimination". When asked about these comments in an interview on October 28, she said that she had misspoken and that she meant to say that she had not personally discriminated against gay people in that manner.

=== Gun policy ===
Earle-Sears supports gun rights and opposes the addition of new gun control legislation.

During the 2021 lieutenant gubernatorial campaign for her party's nomination, Earle-Sears faced scrutiny over a campaign image depicting her holding a rifle on a campaign sign: a portrayal she defended amid ensuing controversy. As a state delegate and lieutenant governor, Earle-Sears opposed gun safety legislation. In 2022 — after the Uvalde school shooting — Earle-Sears spoke at an NRA meeting. She attributed gun violence to "the breakdown of the family", personal responsibility, and violent political rhetoric.

During her 2025 gubernatorial campaign, Earle-Sears was endorsed by the National Rifle Association (NRA) who supported her campaign for being "pro-gun."

== Personal life ==
Earle-Sears has been married to Marine officer Terence Sears since 1986. Earle-Sears has three daughters. One of her daughters, along with her two grandchildren, died in a motor vehicle collision in 2012.

As of 2016, Earle-Sears lived in Winchester, Virginia.

As of 2022, she had been attending Victory Church in Winchester, Virginia—an Assemblies of God church—since 2013.

Sears is the author of the Christian self-help book Stop Being a Christian Wimp! (2009). She also wrote How Sweet It Is: Defending the American Dream, published in 2023 by Center Street.

== Electoral history ==
Date	Election	Candidate	Party	Votes	%
Virginia House of Delegates, 90th district
November 6, 2001	General	Winsome Sears	Republican	6,696	52.65
November 6, 2001	General	Billy Robinson (incumbent)	Democratic	6,017	47.31
November 6, 2001	General	Write Ins		4	0.03
November 6, 2001	General	Republican defeated Democratic incumbent			
Virginia 3rd congressional district
November 2, 2004	General	Bobby Scott (incumbent)	Democratic	159,373	69.33
November 2, 2004	General	Winsome Sears	Republican	70,194	30.53
November 2, 2004	General	Write Ins		325	0.14
November 2, 2004	General	Democratic incumbent held seat			
Lieutenant Governor of Virginia
November 2, 2021	General	Winsome Sears	Republican	1,658,332	50.71
November 2, 2021	General	Hala Ayala	Democratic	1,608,030	49.17
November 2, 2021	General	Write Ins		3,807	0.12
November 2, 2021	General	Republican won Democratic-held seat			
Governor of Virginia
November 4, 2025	General	Abigail Spanberger	Democratic	1,976,856	57.58
November 4, 2025	General	Winsome Sears	Republican	1,449,587	42.22
November 4, 2025	General	Write Ins		6,897	0.20
November 4, 2025	General	Democrat won Republican-held seat			

== See also ==
- List of minority governors and lieutenant governors in the United States

Party political offices
Preceded by Jill Vogel	Republican nominee for Lieutenant Governor of Virginia; 2021	Succeeded by John Reid
Preceded by Glenn Youngkin	Republican nominee for Governor of Virginia; 2025	Most recent
Political offices
Preceded by Justin Fairfax	Lieutenant Governor of Virginia; 2022–2026	Succeeded by Ghazala Hashmi
