= Harriette R. Shattuck =

American dramatist

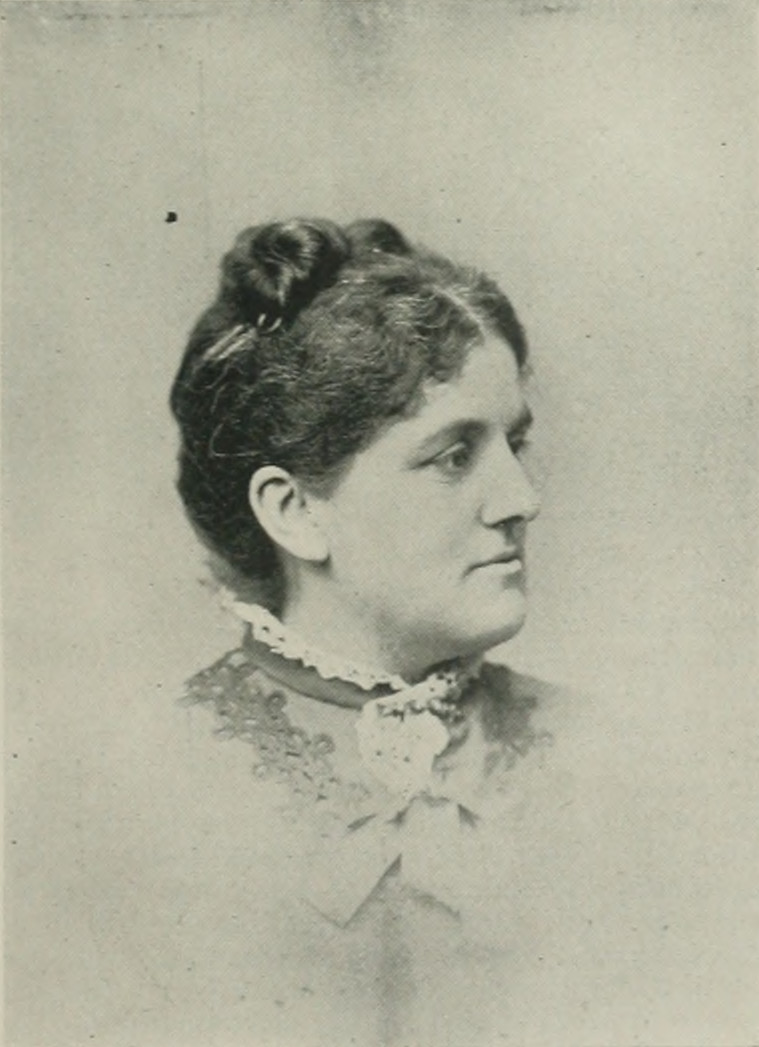
- Photo in A Woman of the Century
- Born: Harriette Lucy Robinson; December 4, 1850; Lowell, Massachusetts, US
- Died: March 24, 1937 (aged 86); Malden, Massachusetts
- Resting place: Sleepy Hollow Cemetery
- Other name: Hattie
- Occupations: author; teacher; suffragist
- Spouse: Sidney Doane Shattuck (m. 1878)
- Parents: William Stevens Robinson; Harriet Hanson Robinson
- Relatives: Elizabeth Osborne Robinson Abbott (sister)

Harriette R. Shattuck (née, Robinson; December 4, 1850 – March 24, 1937) was an American author, parliamentarian, teacher of parliamentary law, and pioneer suffragist. Shattuck served as assistant clerk of the Massachusetts House of Representatives in 1872, being the first woman to hold such a position. She wrote several books, including The Story of Dante's Divine Comedy (1887), Our Mutual Friend: A Comedy in Four Acts, Dramatized from Charles Dickens (1880), The "National" Method (1880), Marriage, Its Dangers and Duties (1882), Little Folks East and West (1891), Woman's Manual of Parliamentary Law (1891), The Woman's Manuel of Parliamentary Law (1895), Shattuck's Advanced Rules for Large Assemblies (1898), Our Mutual Friend: A Comedy, in Four Acts (1909), and Shattuck's Parliamentary Answers, Alphabetically Arranged (1915).

== Early life and education ==
Harriette (nickname, "Hattie") Lucy Robinson was born in Lowell, Massachusetts, December 4, 1850. She was the oldest of four children of William Stevens Robinson and Harriet Jane Hanson Robinson. Her siblings were: Elizabeth Osborne (b. 1852), William Elbridge (1854-1859), and Edward Warrington (b. 1859).

Shattuck was educated in the Malden, Massachusetts public schools. In addition to studying law, she had the advantage of several years of literary training under the supervision of Theodore D. Weld, of Boston. As an adult, she continued to be a student on various subjects, philosophy and politics being the chief ones of late years.

== Career ==
Soon after leaving school, she began to write stories for children and articles for the newspapers on different subjects, mainly relating to women. When her father was clerk of the Massachusetts House of Representatives, she served as assistant clerk, being the first woman to hold such a position in that State (1871–72).

Shattuck served as a clerk in the office of the American Social Science Association in Boston. During the five or six years of the Concord Summer School of Philosophy, she wrote letters for the Boston Evening Transcript, in which the philosophy of the various great teachers, such as Plato, Hegel, Dante and Goethe, was carefully elucidated and made available to the general public. The Story of Dante's Divine Comedy (New York, 1887) was the outcome of those letters from the Concord school. Her other books, are Our Mutual Friend (Boston, 1880), a dramatization from Dickens and Little Folks East and West (Boston, 1891), a book of children's tales.

She was interested in all movements for the advancement of women, especially in the cause of woman's political enfranchisement. She made her first speech for suffrage in Rochester, New York, in 1878. Thereafter, she spoke before committees of Congress and of the Massachusetts legislature, and in many conventions in Washington, D.C. and elsewhere. She was the presiding officer over one of the sessions of the first International Council of Women, held in Washington, D.C., in 1888. She was a quiet speaker and made no attempts at oratory. Her best work was done in writing, rather than in public speaking, unless we include in this term the teaching of politics and of parliamentary law, with the art of presiding and conducting public meetings. Her most popular book was the Woman's Manual of Parliamentary Law (Boston, 1891), a work that was a recognized standard.

For ten years, Shattuck served as president of the National Woman Suffrage Association of Massachusetts. She was also president of the Boston Political Class, which she has conducted for seven years, and in which the science of government and the political topics of the day were considered. She was the founder of "The Old and New" of Malden, Massachusetts, one of the oldest woman's clubs in the country. She was a member of the New England Woman's Press Association.

== Personal life ==
On June 11, 1878, she married Sidney Doane Shattuck, merchant, of Malden.

== Death and legacy ==
She died of pneumonia at Malden Hospital, March 24, 1937. (Note: According to The Boston Globe, Shattuck died March 22, 1937.) She was buried at Sleepy Hollow Cemetery, Concord, Massachusetts.

Her papers and that of her mother are held by the Schlesinger Library, Radcliffe Institute Repository at Harvard University.

== Selected works ==
- The Story of Dante's Divine Comedy (New York, 1887)
- Our Mutual Friend: A Comedy in Four Acts, Dramatized from Charles Dickens (Boston, 1880)
- The "national" Method (1880)
- Marriage, Its Dangers and Duties (1882)
- Little Folks East and West (Boston, 1891)
- Woman's Manual of Parliamentary Law (Boston, 1891)
- The Woman's Manuel of Parliamentary Law (1895)
- Shattuck's Advanced Rules for Large Assemblies: A Supplement ... (1898)
- Our Mutual Friend: A Comedy, in Four Acts (1909)
- Shattuck's Parliamentary Answers, Alphabetically Arranged (1915)
