= William Stevens Robinson =

American journalist

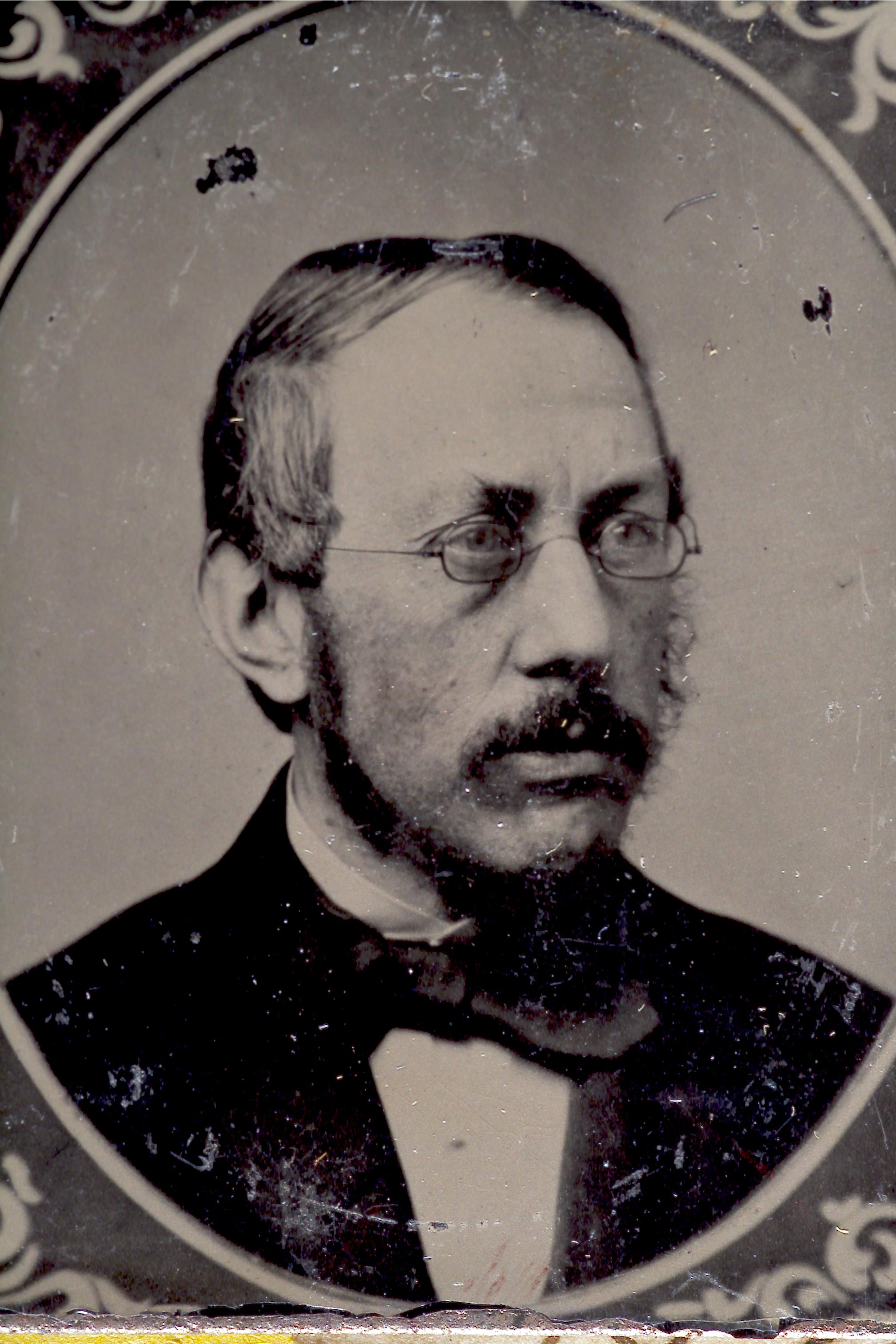
Portrait of William Stevens Robinson, ca. 1860–1866.

William Stevens Robinson (7 December 1818, Concord, Massachusetts – 11 March 1876, Malden, Massachusetts) was a United States journalist.

== Biography ==
He was educated in the public schools of Concord, learned the printer's trade, and joined his brother working on the Norfolk Advertiser in Dedham in 1837. At the age of 20, he became the editor and publisher of the Yeoman's Gazette (later The Republican) in Concord, and was afterward assistant editor of the Lowell Courier. He was an opponent of slavery while he adhered to the Whig Party, and when the Free Soil Party was organized he left the Courier, and in July 1848, took charge of the Boston Daily Whig. His vigorous and sarcastic editorials increased the circulation of the paper, the name of which was changed to the Republican; yet, after the presidential campaign had ended, Henry Wilson, the proprietor, decided to assume the editorial management and moderate the tone of his journal.

Robinson next edited the Lowell American, a Free-soil Democratic paper, until it died for lack of support in 1853. He was a member of the legislature in 1852 and 1853. In 1856 he began to write letters for The Republican over the signature Warrington, in which questions of the day and public men were discussed with such boldness and wit that the correspondence attracted wide popular attention. This connection was continued until his death.

From 1862 until 1873 he was clerk of the Massachusetts House of Representatives. "Warrington," by his articles in the newspapers and magazines, was instrumental in defeating Benjamin F. Butler's effort to obtain the Republican nomination for governor in 1871, and in 1873 he was Butler's strongest opponent. He also contributed letters to the New-York Tribune over the name Gilbert, but declined an opportunity to join its editorial staff.

Besides pamphlets and addresses, he published a Manual of Parliamentary Law (Boston, 1875). His widow, Harriet Hanson Robinson, published personal reminiscences from his writings entitled Warrington Pen-Portraits, with a memoir (Boston, 1877). As a worker in the Lowell textile mills, she contributed poems to the Lowell Courier while Mr. Robinson was its editor, and from this introduction sprang a friendship that resulted in their marriage on 30 November 1848. They both worked for women's suffrage in Massachusetts, and she assisted him in his editorial work.

Their daughter, Hattie, served as assistant clerk of the Massachusetts House of Representatives in 1872, being the first woman to hold such a position. Another daughter Elizabeth was a pioneer in introducing kindergarten to the state of Connecticut.
