= William Robinson (historian) =

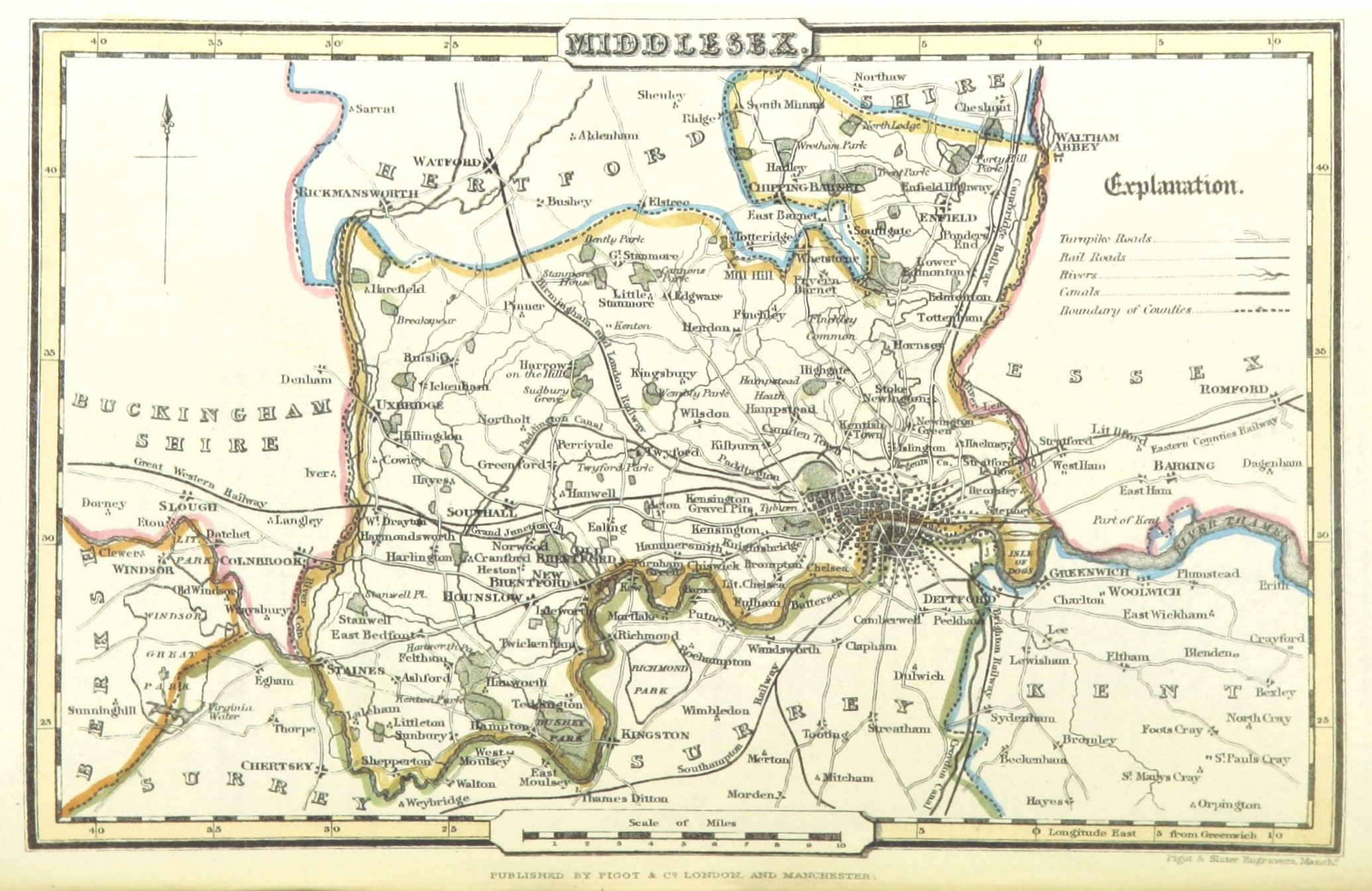
Middlesex, 1842.

William Robinson (1777-1848) was a solicitor and barrister who practised at Bartlett's Buildings, Holborn, London. He wrote a number of books on the history of Middlesex as well as several legal text books. He was elected fellow of the Society of Antiquaries of London in 1819. He was born and died in Tottenham. The London Metropolitan Archives holds his unpublished notes on the history of Stepney and its neighbourhood.

== Selected publications ==
=== History ===
- The History and Antiquities of the Parish of Tottenham High Cross, in the County of Middlesex, comprising an account of the manors, the church, and other miscellaneous matter (1818, 2nd ed 1840)
- The History and Antiquities of the Parish of Edmonton, in the County of Middlesex (1819)
- The History and Antiquities of the Parish of Stoke Newington, in the County of Middlesex (1820, 2nd ed 1842)
- The History and Antiquities of Enfield, in the County of Middlesex (1823)
- The History and Antiquities of the Parish of Hackney, in the County of Middlesex (1842)
- A Short History of Ancient Britain (1845)

=== Law ===
- The Magistrate's Pocket-book, Or, An Epitome of the Duties and Practice of a Justice of the Peace &c (London, 1825; 4th edit. by J. F. Archbold, 1842)
- Lex Parochialis, Or, A Compendium of the Laws Relating to the Poor: With the Adjudged Cases on Parochial Settlements &c. (London, 1827)
- Formularies, Or, The Magistrate's Assistant &c. (2 vols. London, 1827)
- An Analysis of and Digested Index to the Criminal Statutes &c (London, 1829)
- The Introduction of a Justice of the Peace to the Court of Quarter Sessions of The Peace (London, 1836)
- A Breviary of the Poor Laws &c (London, 1837)
