= Will Robinson (music producer) =

British music producer

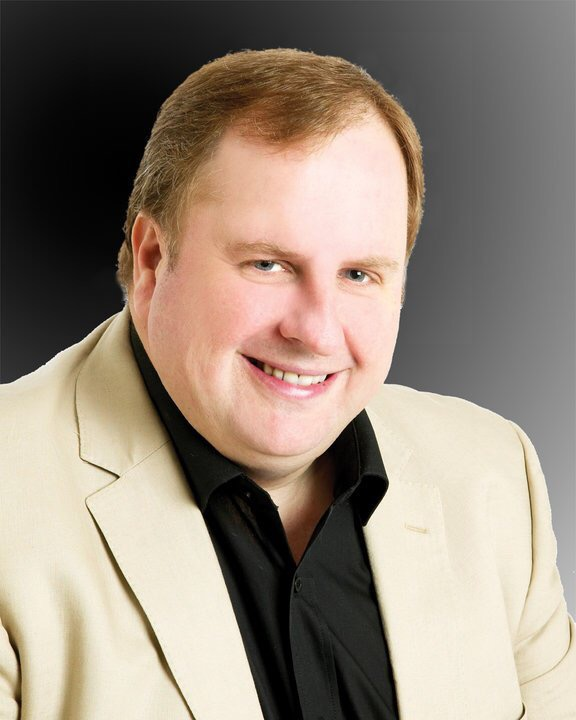
- Born: 1967 (age 58–59); Knutsford, Cheshire
- Occupations: Executive music producer; agent; promoter; director

Will Robinson (born 1967) is a British executive music producer, agent, promoter and director. Is best known for his songs from his projects "The World Red Army", "Glory Glory Man United", "The Isan project" and "Thailand Amazing Thailand".

== Life and career ==
Robinson was born in Knutsford, Cheshire, England, and he went to school in Macclesfield at Beech Hall, and later in Shropshire at Ellesmere College. Hailing from a musical family, Robinson became P.A. to world snooker champion Alex Higgins in 1987. Robinson organized the controversial funeral in Belfast 2010 for his former boss "The People's Champion" (BBC Documentary), that saw over 20,000 lines the streets to say goodbye.

Robinson set up his own talent agency in 1994 to develop and promote talent, following looking after Gwen Dickey of Rose Royce, The Pasadenas and China Black his agency started to attract more international names including, Leo Sayer, The Real Thing, Adeva, CeCe Peniston, Jaki Graham, Liberty X, Antonia Fargas, Jocelyn Brown and The Cheeky Girls. His spell in management included teenager songwriter Daniel Ryan who he signed to Publisher MCS, a co-management with RCA scout Derek Brandwood, who he co-managed opera star Russell Watson. In 2002, Robinson teamed up with Robin Gibb and his manager to develop talent with a production company. This was to start a long relationship for Robinson with Robin Gibb's producer, Michael Graves. Graves co-produced "Glory Glory Man United" with Robinson in 2008. This was a full-length song version that Robinson co-wrote of popular Manchester United F.C. chant, which became the official song at Old Trafford, and the lyrics used in the Chevrolet Manchester United advert in 2014. Robinson went on to release another project of his own called "The Isan Project" of Isan music from the North East of Thailand which he has fused with Western beats. Two of the tracks from the album, Forever and Strangers, were successful in the UK Music Week pop chart and his project topped the single charts in Thailand with their first No.1, "Nana". His album, The Spirit of Isan, was released in 2016. In October 2018, Robinson collaborated with Daniel Ryan on a song for the Tham Luang cave rescue in Thailand called "Heroes of Thailand" by The Isan Project.
