= William Whipple Robinson =

American politician

William Whipple Robinson was the second Los Angeles City Auditor, from December 5, 1879 until December 13, 1886. Previously, he was elected to represent the 2nd Ward on the Los Angeles Common Council, the legislative branch of the city, from December 18, 1874, to December 9, 1875.

Preceded by Unknown	Los Angeles City Auditor; 1879—1886	Succeeded by Freeman G. Teed
