= William F. Robinson =

American politician and baseball player

William F. Robinson (December 29, 1913 – July 5, 2008) was a Democrat American politician and semiprofessional baseball player from Buffalo, New York. He represented the 3rd District of the Erie County Legislature from 1986 to 1993.

Robinson was born in Valdosta, Georgia and spent part of his youth in Miami, Florida, where he excelled at baseball while attending White Plains High School and playing on championship teams.

In 1934, Robinson went on to play in the Negro leagues for the Brooklyn Royals. He was a catcher for the team until 1940, and his uniform now hangs in the Negro Leagues Baseball Museum in Kansas City, Missouri.

Robinson moved to Buffalo in 1942 and worked as a welder and a bus driver.

Political offices
Preceded by Barry L. Robinson	3rd District Erie County Legislator; 1986-1993	Succeeded by George A. Holt, Jr.
