= William P. Robinson Sr. =

American politician

Member of the Virginia House of Delegates from the 39th district
- In office January 14, 1970 – January 18, 1981
- Preceded by: Stanley E. Sacks
- Succeeded by: Billy Robinson

Personal details
- Born: William Peters Robinson; March 15, 1911 Norfolk, Virginia, U.S.
- Died: January 18, 1981 (aged 69) Norfolk, Virginia, U.S.
- Party: Democratic
- Children: Billy
- Education: Howard University (BS, MA); New York University (PhD)
- Occupation: Educator; politician

William Peters Robinson Sr. (March 15, 1911 – January 18, 1981) was an American university professor and politician who served as a member of the Virginia House of Delegates. On his death in 1981, he was succeeded by his son, Billy.
