= Virginia's 90th House of Delegates district =

Virginia state legislature district

District map from the 2023 election

Virginia's 90th House of Delegates district elects one of the 100 members of the Virginia House of Delegates, the lower house of the state's bicameral legislature. The district is made up of parts of the cities of Chesapeake and Virginia Beach in the southeastern part of the state.

The seat has been held by Angelia Williams Graves, a member of the Democratic Party, who was sworn in after winning a 2021 special election. Previously, the district was held by the Democrat Joseph C. Lindsey from 2014 until his 2020 retirement to accept a judgeship.

== District officeholders ==
Years	Delegate	Party	Electoral history
January 12, 1983 – January 3, 2002	Billy Robinson	Democratic	Defeated in bid for reelection
January 3, 2002 – January 14, 2004	Winsome Sears	Republican	Declined to seek reelection; Unsuccessfully ran for US House of Representatives
January 14, 2004 – June 30, 2014	Algie Howell	Democratic	Retired
September 18, 2014 – November 15, 2020	Joseph C. Lindsey	Democratic	First elected via special election in 2014; left in 2020 to accept judgeship
January 13, 2021 – present	Angelia Williams Graves	Democratic	First elected via special election in 2021

== Electoral history ==
Date	Election	Candidate	Party	Votes	%
Virginia House of Delegates, 90th district
Nov 6, 2001	General	W E Sears	Republican	6,696	53
Nov 6, 2001	General	W P Robinson Jr	Democratic	6,017	43
Nov 6, 2001	General	Write Ins		4	0
Nov 6, 2001	General	Republican defeated Democratic incumbent			
Nov 4, 2003	General	A T Howell Jr	Democratic	3,850	97.47
Nov 4, 2003	General	Write Ins		100	2.53
Nov 4, 2003	General	Winsome Sears retired; seat changed from Republican to Democratic			
Jun 14, 2005	Democratic primary	A T Howell Jr		1,040	60.82
Jun 14, 2005	Democratic primary	K A Boose		670	39.18
Nov 8, 2005	General	A T Howell Jr	Democratic	9,438	98.73
Nov 8, 2005	General	Write Ins		121	1.27
Nov 6, 2007	General	Algie T. Howell, Jr.	Democratic	3,619	97.07
Nov 6, 2007	General	Write Ins		109	2.92
Jun 9, 2009	Democratic primary	Algie T. Howell, Jr.		1,888	69.61
Jun 9, 2009	Democratic primary	Lionell Spruill, Jr.		824	30.38
Nov 3, 2009	General	Algie T. Howell, Jr.	Democratic	7,398	66.64
Nov 3, 2009	General	Jason E. Call	Republican	3,672	33.07
Nov 3, 2009	General	Write Ins		31	0.27
Aug 23, 2011	Democratic primary	Algie T. Howell, Jr.		1,313	59.76
Aug 23, 2011	Democratic primary	Richard "Rick" James		884	40.23
Nov 8, 2011	General	Algie T. Howell, Jr.	Democratic	4,193	97.08
Nov 8, 2011	General	Write Ins		126	2.91
Jun 11, 2013	Democratic primary	Algie T. Howell, Jr.		1,759	68.18
Jun 11, 2013	Democratic primary	Richard "Rick" James		821	31.82
