= Billy Robinson (politician) =

Member of the Virginia House of Delegates

Member of the Virginia House of Delegates
- In office February 5, 1981 – January 9, 2002
- Preceded by: William P. Robinson Sr.
- Succeeded by: Winsome Sears
- Constituency: 39th district (1981–1982); 37th district (1982–1983); 90th district (1983–2002)

Personal details
- Born: William Peters Robinson Jr. October 14, 1942 Washington, D.C., U.S.
- Died: December 18, 2006 (aged 64) Norfolk, Virginia, U.S.
- Party: Democratic
- Spouse: Sylvia
- Parent: William P. Robinson Sr. (father)
- Education: Morehouse College (BA); Harvard University (LLB)
- Occupation: Lawyer; politician

William Peters Robinson Jr. (October 14, 1942 – December 18, 2006) was an American lawyer and politician who served as a member of the Virginia House of Delegates. He was first elected in a 1981 special election to succeed his father, William P. Robinson Sr.

Virginia House of Delegates
Preceded by William P. Robinson Sr.	Member of the Virginia House of Delegates from the 39th district February 5, 1981–January 13, 1982	Succeeded by Johnny Joannou; L. Cleaves Manning
Preceded by C. Hardaway Marks	Member of the Virginia House of Delegates from the 37th district January 13, 1982–January 12, 1983	Succeeded by Stephen E. Gordy
Preceded by None (district created)	Member of the Virginia House of Delegates from the 90th district January 12, 1983–January 9, 2002	Succeeded by Winsome Sears
