= Mugar =

Mugar is an American surname, shortened from the Armenian family name Mugardichian or derMugardichian.

Mugar may refer to:

== Mugar family ==
A prominent family associated with Greater Boston, Massachusetts, U.S.

=== People ===
- Carolyn Mugar (born c. 1943), activist and daughter of Stephen
- David G. Mugar (1939–2022), businessman and son of Stephen
- John M. Mugar (1914–2007), businessman and cousin of Stephen
- Stephen P. Mugar (1901–1982), founder of the Star Market supermarket chain

=== Structures ===
- Mugar Memorial Library, at Boston University
- Mugar Omni Theater, at the Museum of Science, Boston

== Other uses ==
- Mugar River, in Ethiopia
  - Mugar or Muger, a cement plant in Durba, Ethiopia located near this river
  - Muger Cement, a football (soccer) club associated with the cement plant

== See also ==
- Muger (disambiguation)
