= Waltham Gas Light Company =

- U.S. National Register of Historic Places
- U.S. Historic district
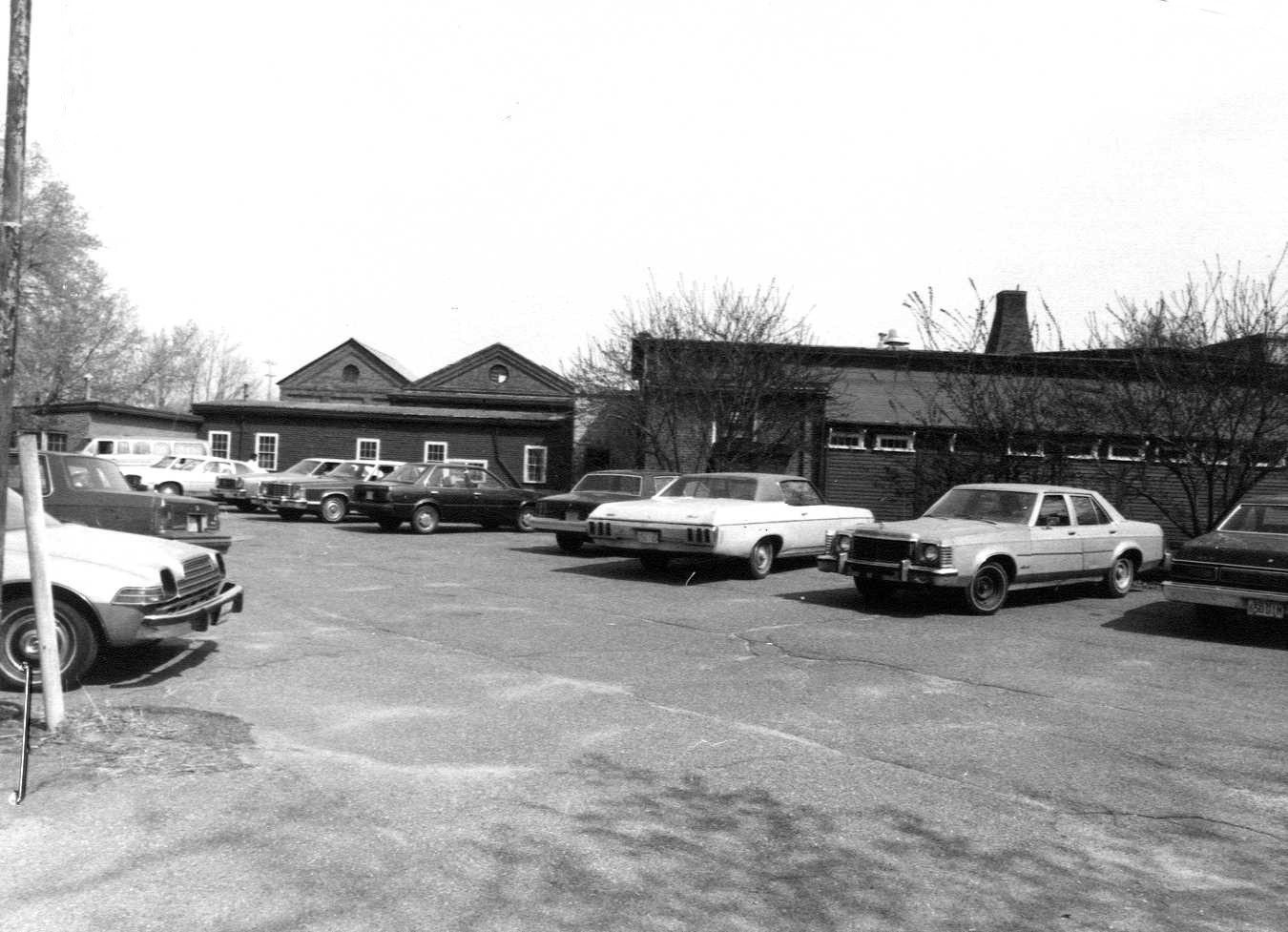
- c. 1984 photo

- Location within Massachusetts Location within the United States
- Location: 2 Cooper St., Waltham, Massachusetts
- Coordinates: 42°22′19″N 71°14′1″W
- MPS: Waltham MRA
- NRHP reference No.: 89001506
- Added to NRHP: September 28, 1989

The Waltham Gas Light Company was a historic industrial facility located at 2 Cooper Street in Waltham, Massachusetts. It was one of the oldest industrial complexes on the South Side of the city, with brick buildings dating to 1854–55, not long after the founding of the company. The Waltham Gas Light Company was founded in 1853 to provide natural gas for "illumination, fuel, and power" to the area. In 1886 the company added an electrical generation plant to the property, which lay in an area roughly bounded by the Charles River, the Boston & Maine railroad right-of-way, and Cooper Street, which now serves an access to the municipal parking garage just west of the company property. The company shut down in 1909, transferring its electrical business to Boston Edison, which still operates an electrical substation in a nearby former company building. The other company buildings were converted to other manufacturing uses, and were demolished in 2007.

The complex was listed on the National Register of Historic Places in 1989, and has not been delisted since its demolition.

== See also ==
- National Register of Historic Places listings in Waltham, Massachusetts
