= Armenians in Massachusetts =

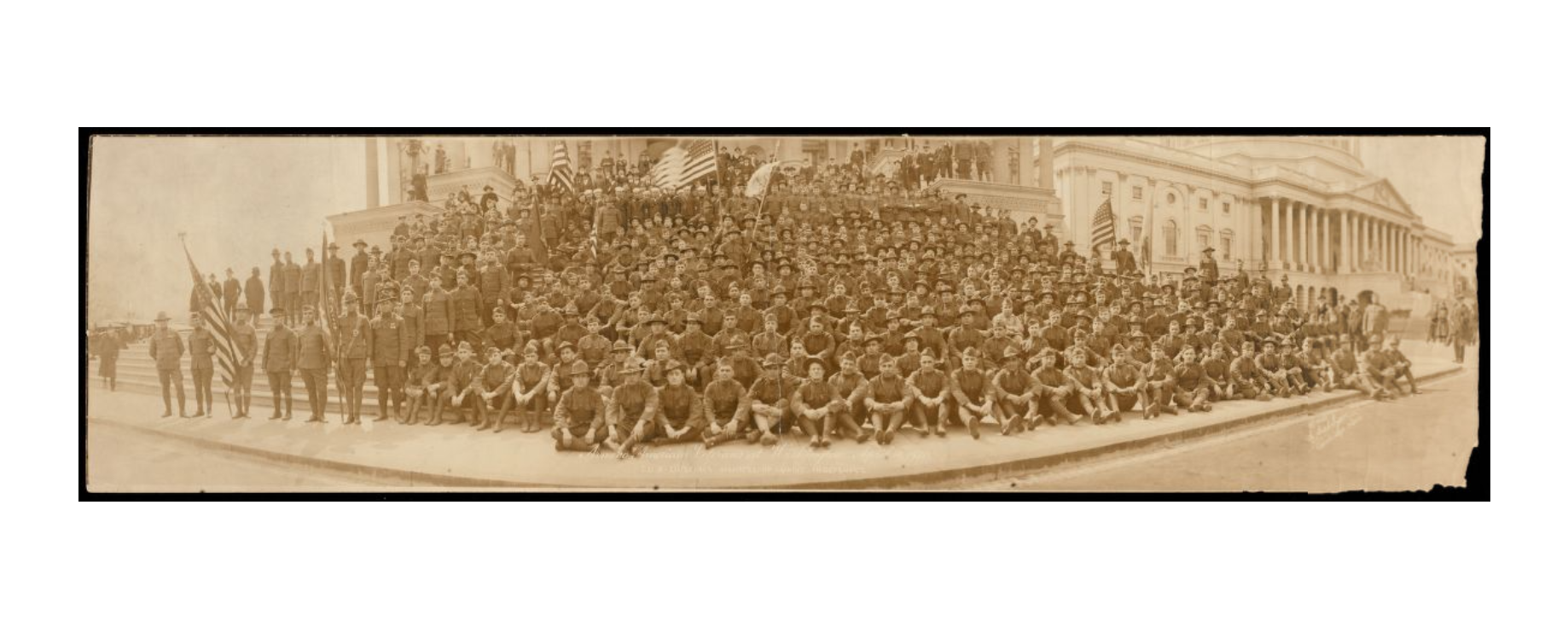
Armenian American Veterans from Boston branch at Washington April 14, 1920

Massachusetts is home to one of the largest Armenian American communities in the United States, with significant concentrations in the Greater Boston area, particularly in Watertown, Cambridge, and Belmont.

== History ==
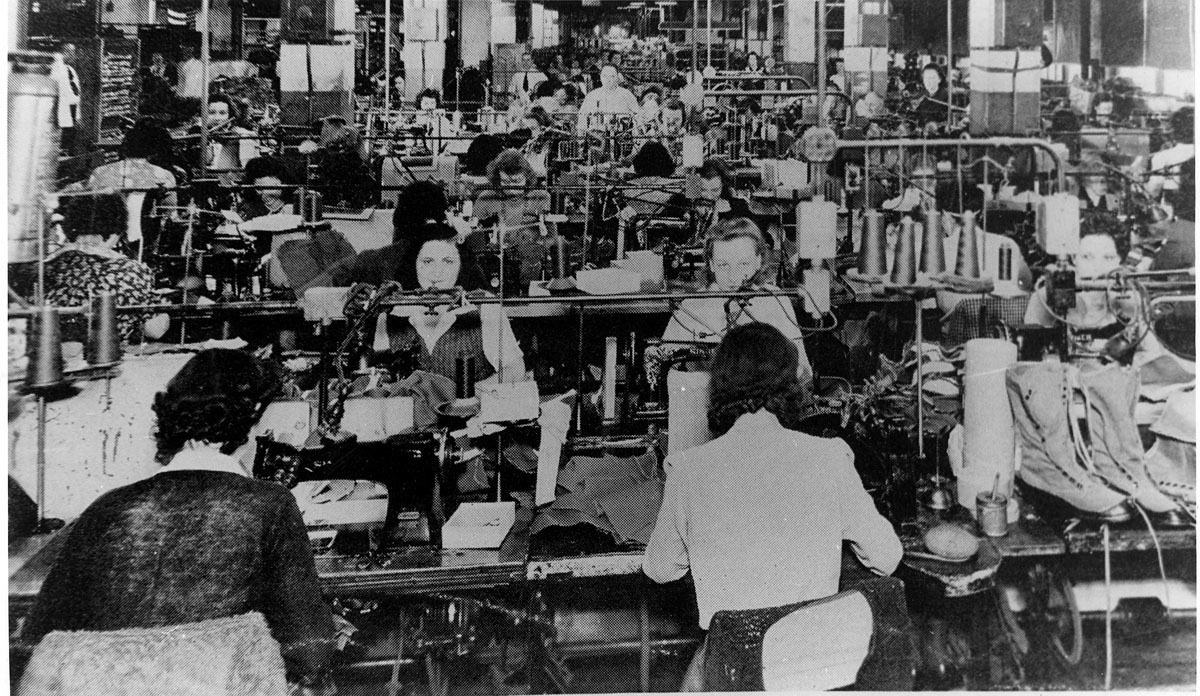
Hood Rubber Company in Watertown, MA where many Armenian immigrants worked in the early 1900s.

The first recorded Armenian to live in North America was Martin the Armenian in 1618 but the first significant wave of Armenian immigrants arrived in Massachusetts in the late 19th and early 20th centuries. By 1899, 14,192 Armenians were living in Massachusetts. These early immigrants were fleeing economic hardship and political persecution in the Ottoman Empire. The influx of Armenians increased significantly following the Armenian Genocide of 1915–1917, when many survivors sought refuge in the United States.

Before 1910, most Armenian immigrants arriving in the United States were men with backgrounds in farming, skilled crafts, and manual labor. Compared to many other immigrant groups at the time, they had relatively high literacy levels, with roughly 75% able to read and write Armenian. Despite their skills, many who settled in Massachusetts found work in factory settings, taking on mostly unskilled or semi-skilled roles in industries such as shoemaking, textiles, rubber production, and metalwork.

The earliest Armenians of Worcester, Massachusetts, worked in heavy industry and metal manufacturing such as Washburn & Moen Manufacturing Company wire mills.

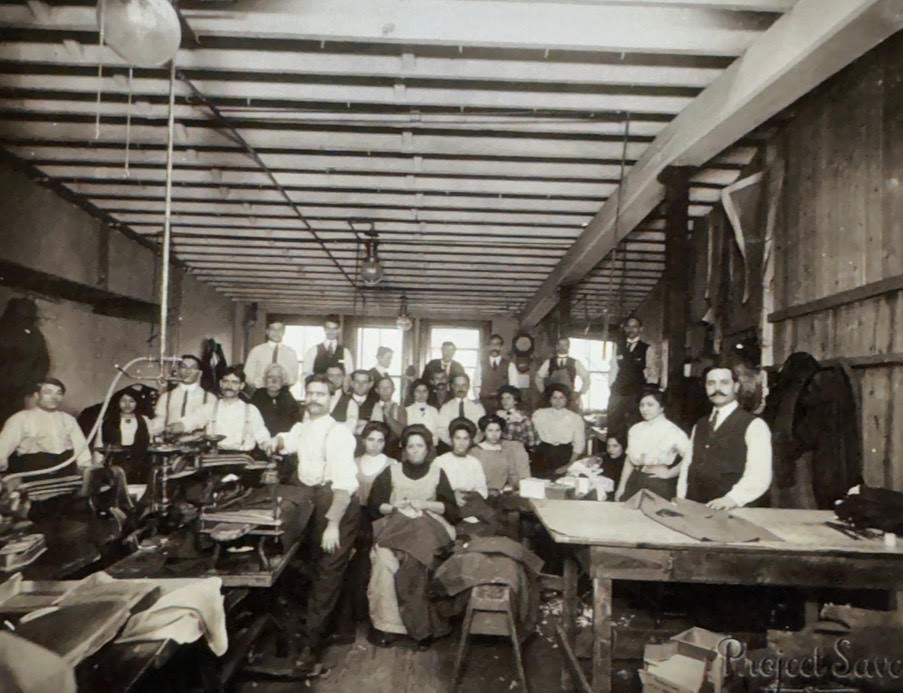
The Kondazian Coat Manufacturing Co. (now the Eastern Clothing Company). 1912. Watertown, MA where many Armenian immigrants worked.

The establishment of the Armenian community in Worcester began in 1867, shortly after the arrival of Garo from Bitlis. Garo was initially employed as a servant for missionary George C. Knapp. According to oral history, an Irish laundrywoman working at the same household persuaded Garo that he could earn more by working in local factories, rather than continuing with his meager monthly wage of 75 cents. Motivated by this advice, Garo transitioned to factory work, where he earned a significantly higher daily wage of $1.75. This opportunity attracted more Armenians to Worcester, all seeking to achieve their own version of the American dream. One of the major contributions of Armenians to American commerce was oriental rugs; one of the first to do so in Boston was an Armenian named Hagop Bogigian. Denholm & McKay employed many first generation Armenian American women.

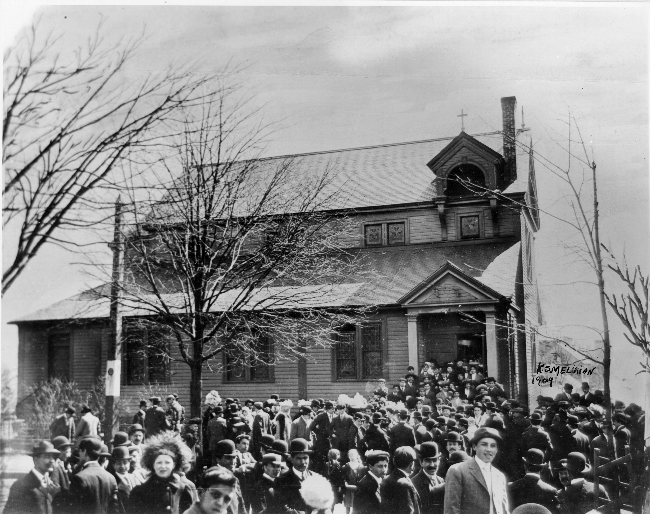
The first Armenian church in the western hemisphere was built in Worcester on 1891. Picture taken in 1909.

During the late 19th and early 20th centuries, Worcester, Massachusetts became a major hub for Armenian immigrants in the United States. This connection was initially established by New England Protestant missionaries who had worked in the Ottoman Empire and facilitated Armenian converts' migration to America (Deranian, 1998). As Armenians fled violent persecution in their homeland, they brought with them their political organizations, churches, businesses, and a resilient culture, transforming Worcester into a vibrant Armenian community. Upon their arrival, Armenians faced new legal challenges in the U.S. due to their racial classification. Court cases in 1909 (In re Halladjian) and 1925 (U.S. v Cartozian) ruled that Armenians were legally considered white, allowing them to obtain American citizenship and opportunities for prosperity (Haney-Lopez, 1996). While the Armenian Genocide has been widely discussed by historians, less attention has been given to the experiences of Armenians in the U.S. within the context of their legal classification as white.

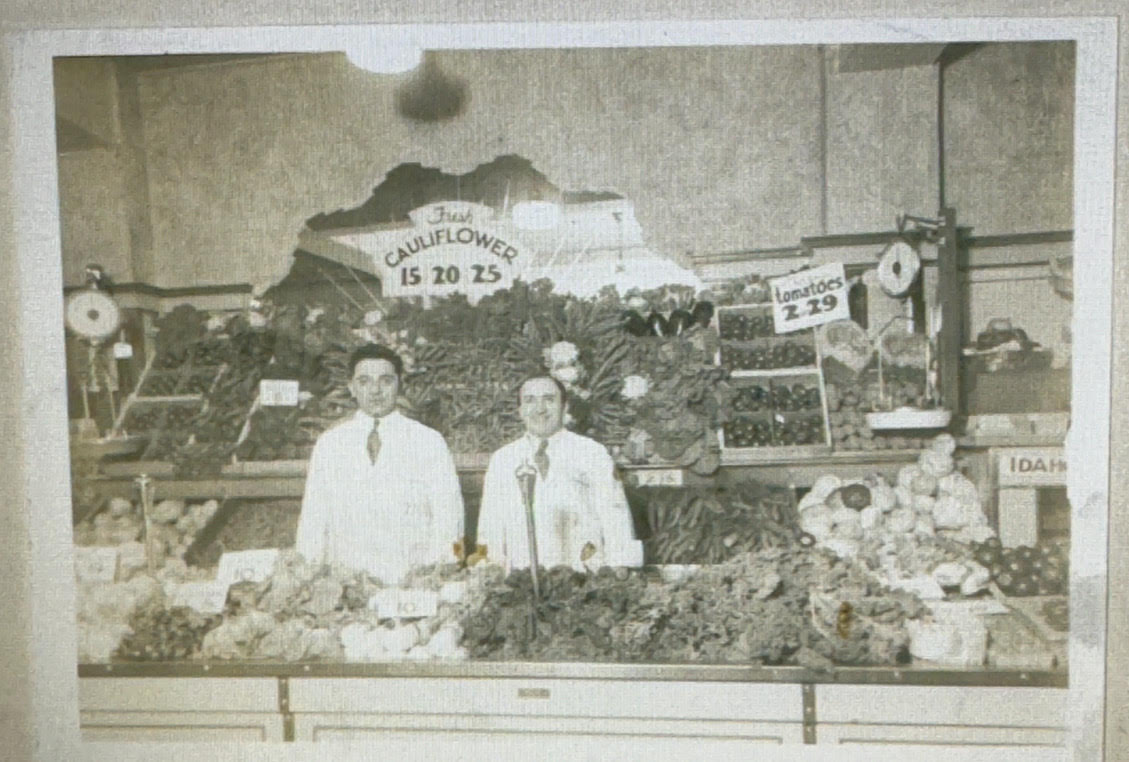
Myron Kelligian and Archie Pilibosian - Star Market, Watertown, MA. 1934

Watertown became a key destination for Armenian immigrants, particularly after the Hood Rubber factory opened in 1896. This period coincided with the mass migration of Armenians fleeing the massacres of the 1890s, establishing a direct connection between the Armenian provinces and East Watertown. Following the genocide, the influx continued, and by 1930, the Armenian population in Watertown had grown to over 3,500, accounting for nearly ten percent of the town's residents. Over the years, Watertown evolved into a major hub of Armenian culture and heritage, even as later generations moved to nearby suburbs.

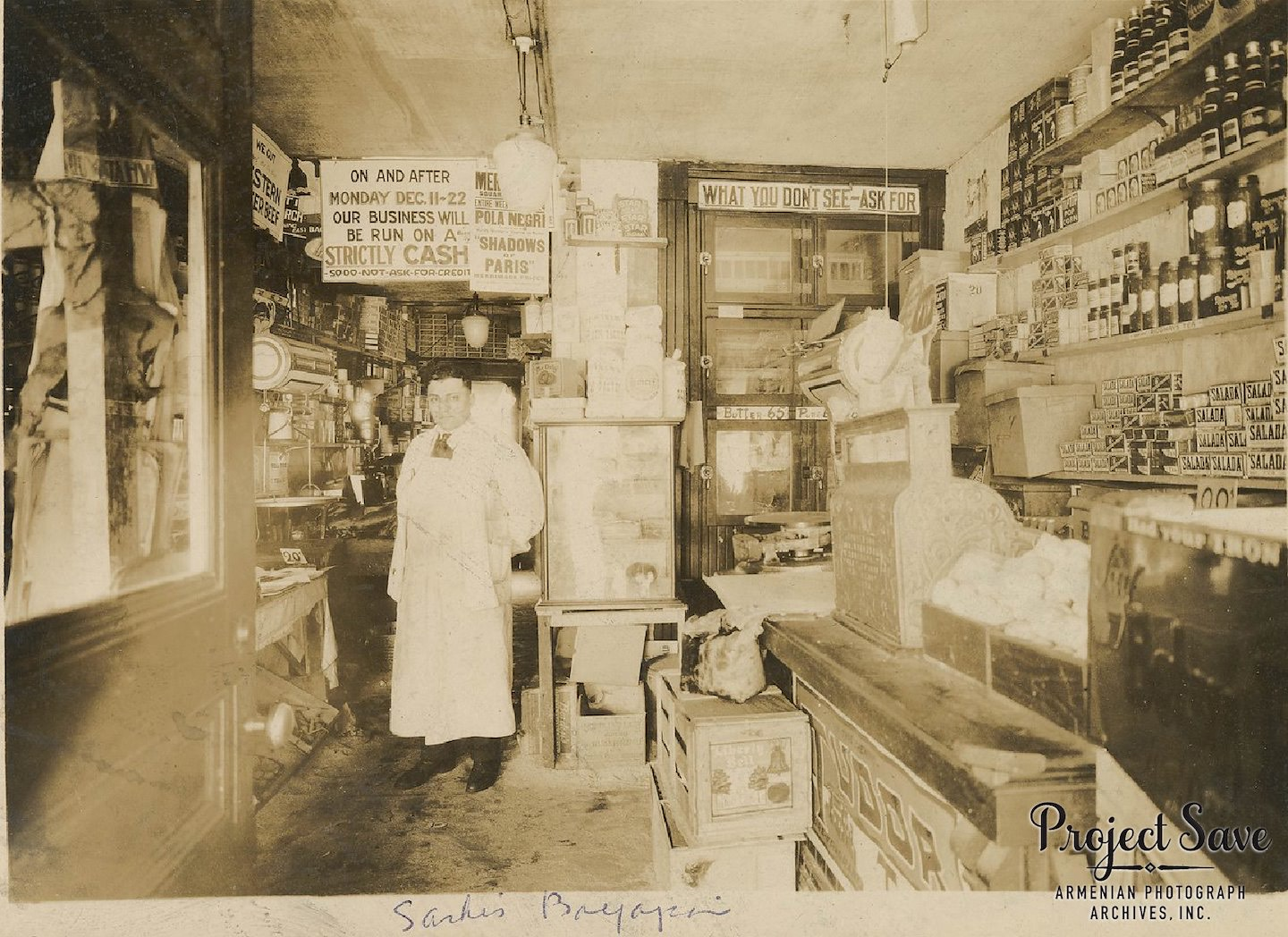
Photograph of Sarkis Boyajian standing in a grocery store, wearing a white apron. Barlow's Market, 5 Merrimack Sq. (or St.), Lowell, MA. 1922

According to the 2020 U.S. Census, there are approximately 30,000 Armenian Americans in Massachusetts. The largest concentration is in the Greater Boston area, especially in Watertown, which is often considered the heart of the Armenian American community in the state. Other significant populations can be found in Cambridge, Belmont, Worcester, and Springfield.

== Notable people ==
- Arlene Francis - American game show panelist, actress, radio and television talk show host
- Hagop Bogigian - Opened oriental carpet store on Harvard Square in the 1870s, and is known as the "first Armenian American millionaire"
- George Keverian - Politician and speaker of the Massachusetts House of Representatives from 1985 until 1991
- Peter Koutoujian - is an American politician who is the current Sheriff of Middlesex County, Massachusetts and a former member of the Massachusetts House of Representatives.
- Gabrielle R. Wolohojian - serves as an associate justice of the Massachusetts Supreme Judicial Court.
- Moses H. Gulesian - Armenian businessman
- Stephen P. Mugar - founder of Star Market chain
- Noubar Afeyan - co-founder of Moderna
- Varaztad Kazanjian - founder of modern plastic surgery
- Haig Kazazian - Kazazian determined the molecular basis of single-gene genetic disorders such as hemoglobinopathies and hemophilia and introduced prenatal diagnosis for such disorders.
- Alan Hovhaness - composed over 500 works, including symphonies and operas.
- Rose and Sarkis Colombosian - founded Colombo Yogurt
- Edward Avedisian - abstract painter who came into prominence during the 1960s. His work was initially associated with Color field painting and in the late 1960s with Lyrical Abstraction.
- Mugar family - well known family in New England for business and philanthropy roles; founded Star Market

== Education ==
St. Stephen's Armenian Elementary School in Watertown offers bilingual education for Pre-K through 5th grade, emphasizing Armenian history, language, and culture.

Erebuni Armenian School in Belmont, MA.

Holy Trinity Armenian School in Cambridge, MA

== See also ==
- Armenian Library and Museum of America
- Armenian Americans
- Armenian Heritage Park
