= Muger =

Muger may refer to:

- Muger, Iran (disambiguation), villages in Kohgiluyeh and Boyer-Ahmad Province, Iran
- Muger River, in central Ethiopia
- Muger Cement, a football (soccer) team in Ethiopia
- Maximilian Müger (born 1993), German politician

== See also ==
- Mugar (disambiguation)
- Mugger (disambiguation)
