= David G. Mugar =

Armenian-American businessman (1939–2022)

- Born: April 27, 1939; Cambridge, Massachusetts, U.S.
- Died: January 25, 2022 (aged 82); Boston, Massachusetts, U.S.
- Education: Cambridge School of Weston
- Alma mater: Babson College
- Occupations: Businessman, producer
- Known for: Owner of Boston-area channel 7; Involvement with Boston's Fourth of July celebration
- Children: 3
- Father: Stephen P. Mugar
- Relatives: Carolyn Mugar (sister)

David Graves Mugar (April 27, 1939 – January 25, 2022) was an American businessman from Belmont, Massachusetts. He was a member of the Mugar family of Greater Boston. He was CEO and chair of Mugar Enterprises. His father, Stephen P. Mugar, was the founder of the Star Market supermarket chain and was also a major Boston-area philanthropist.

== Life and career ==
Mugar was born on April 27, 1939. He attended the Cambridge School of Weston and in 1962 graduated from Babson College. The Mugar Omni Theater at Boston's Museum of Science was named after Mugar's parents, and Mugar was a museum trustee. Boston University's Mugar Memorial Library, the university's main study and research library, is named after his grandparents.

Mugar worked as an executive producer of Boston's Fourth of July celebration—since the mid-1970s, closely associated with the Boston Pops concert at the Hatch Memorial Shell on the Esplanade—organized by the Boston 4 Celebrations Foundation, a not-for-profit organization founded by Mugar. Mugar also owned WNEV, later known as WHDH (locally, channel 7), a television station broadcasting throughout the Greater Boston area.

In 2002, Mugar gave $5,000,000 for a new wing at the Cape Cod Hospital, in Hyannis, Massachusetts.

In 2011, Mugar was entangled in controversy when it was discovered that the CBS national coverage of Boston's Fourth of July celebration included digitally-altered fireworks clips. During the broadcast, fireworks were seemingly exploding behind famous Boston landmarks, such as home plate at Fenway Park, the Massachusetts State House, and Faneuil Hall. Some viewers noticed the geographical impossibility of these clips and alerted The Boston Globe. A front-page story in the newspaper on July 8 broke the story to the public.

According to the Federal Election Commission, in 2011 Mugar donated $250,000 to Restore Our Future, Inc., the super PAC supporting Mitt Romney's presidential campaign.

Mugar died on January 25, 2022, at the age of 82. In September 2023, a bronze statue of Mugar was unveiled on the Esplanade in Boston. At the dedication of the statue, the governor of Massachusetts, Charlie Baker, commented:

His generosity, creativity, and long-standing commitment to do something very special for people of New England to celebrate our nation’s humble beginnings is wholeheartedly worthy of permanent remembrance.
