= Muger, Iran =

Muger (Persian: موگر) may refer to:

- Muger, Boyer-Ahmad
- Muger, Gachsaran
- Muger, Landeh
