= Sawins Pond =

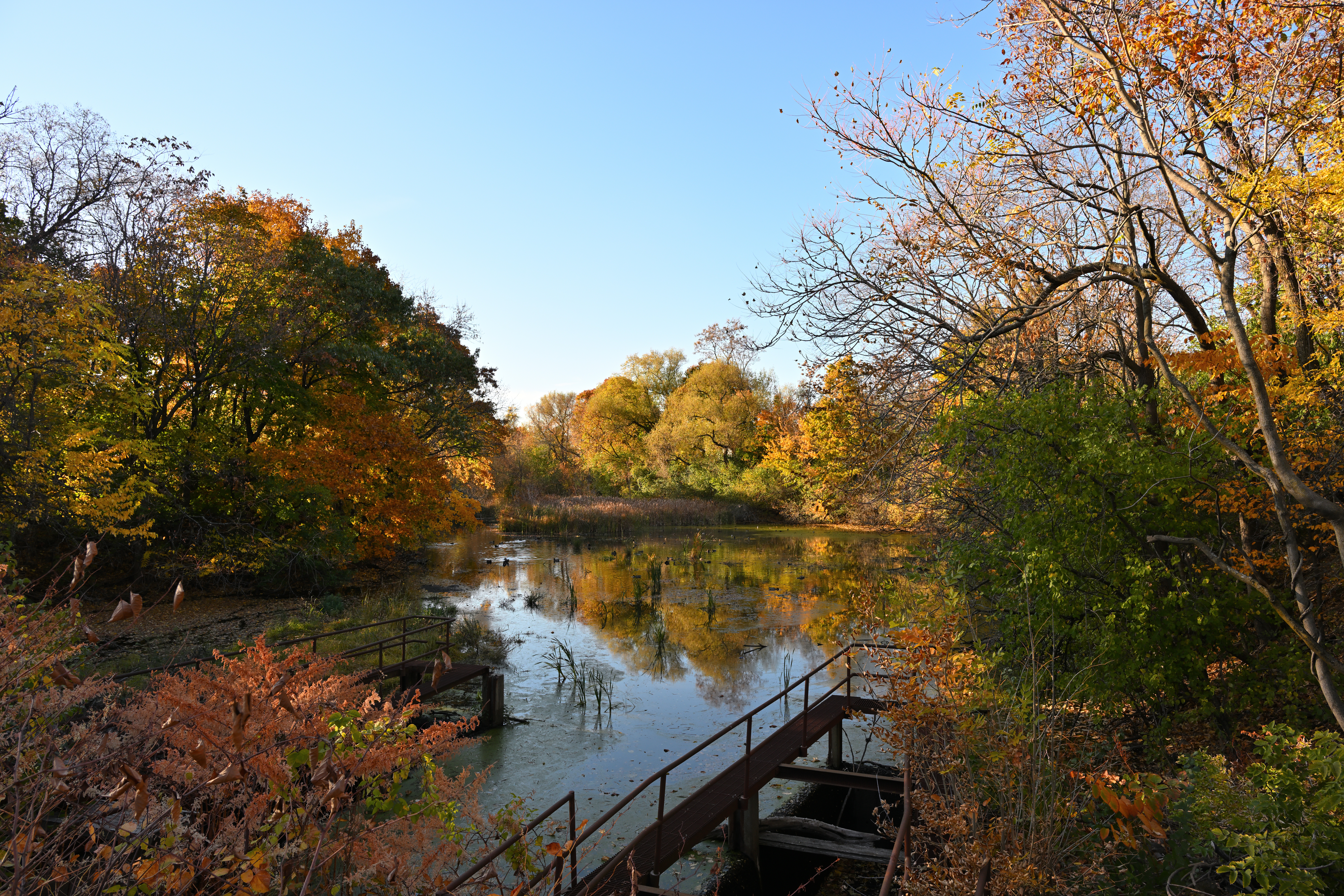
- Sawins Pond in the fall

- Location within Massachusetts
- Location: Watertown, Middlesex County, Massachusetts
- Coordinates: 42°21′51.5″N 71°09′07″W
- Type: man-made lake

Sawins Pond is a man-made pond created in the 19th century in Watertown, Massachusetts, USA. Its banks were the site of an upscale hotel, and it was a popular fishing and swimming spot. It was then used by Hood Rubber Company, and then BF Goodrich. They deposited scores of barrels onto the site, filled with rubber scraps.

== Boston Edison/NSTAR and PCBs ==
Boston Edison Company (currently NSTAR) for many years operated a facility just behind the Watertown Mall. From this facility, there are culverts (large underground water drains) that carry storm water and drains under the mall parking lot, into the Sawins and Williams Pond.

Boston Edison used PCBs extensively in the 1970s and 1980s, and still does to this day, albeit on a much more limited basis. During the 1980s and 1990s, there were documented spills at the Boston Edison/NSTAR facility at 480 Arsenal Street. Most of these spills were transformer oil, most of which contains PCBs. In 1982, over 1,100 gallons of PCBs spilled from a truck and went into a storm drain. Unfortunately the spill was not realized by Boston Edison (now NSTAR) company until about a month later, according to EPA and DEP reports. Almost one thousand gallons of high PCB oil reached Sawins, some of it was recovered by Boston Edison company through remediation efforts on the property. The rest is likely to have made its way into the Charles River, with the balance remaining in the pond sediments and comprising the detectable elevated levels seen by scientists today.

NSTAR, a major New England public electric utility, is responsible for the PCB pollution, but has refused to pay for the cleanup or for any assessment/engineering costs.
