= Waltham Gas and Electric Company Generating Plant =

- U.S. National Register of Historic Places
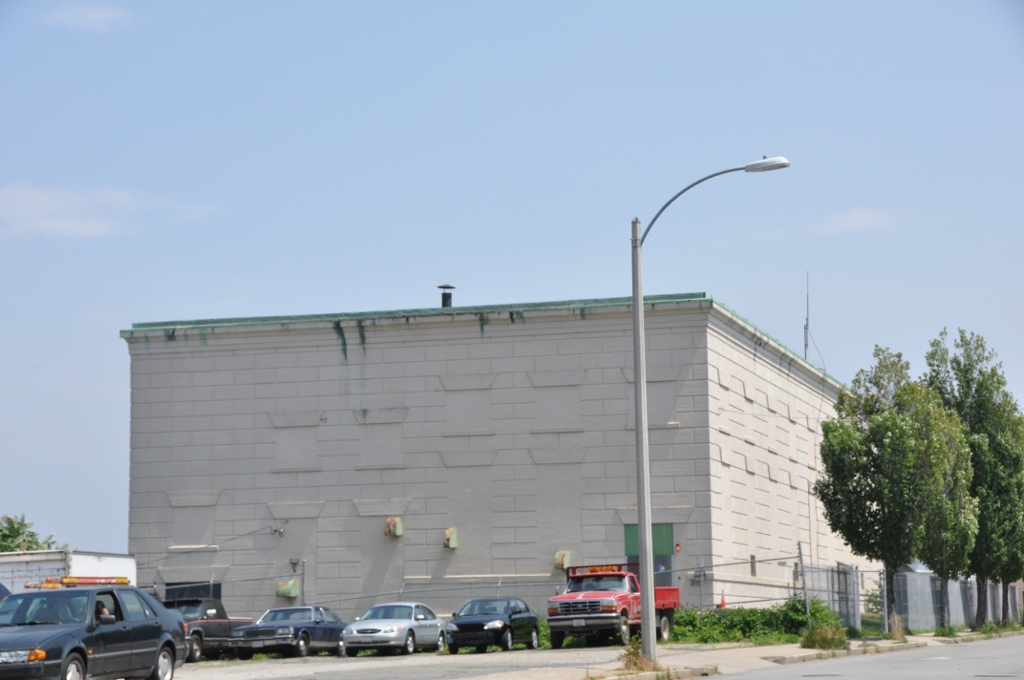

- Location within Massachusetts Location within the United States
- Location: 96 Pine St., Waltham, Massachusetts
- Coordinates: 42°22′16″N 71°13′58″W
- MPS: Waltham MRA
- NRHP reference No.: 89001537
- Added to NRHP: September 28, 1989

The Waltham Gas and Electric Company Generating Plant is a historic power company generator building at 96 Pine Street in Waltham, Massachusetts. Built c. 1900–1909, this large concrete-and-stone building is an essentially unaltered early power generation plant, although all of its window openings have been filled with concrete. It originally housed a steam power generator, and was sold by Waltham Gas and Electric to Boston Edison, who converted it to an electrical substation in 1917, a role it continues to fulfill.

The building was listed on the National Register of Historic Places in 1989.

== See also ==
- National Register of Historic Places listings in Waltham, Massachusetts
