= Hagop Bogigian =

First Armenian-American millionaire

Hagop Bogigian (April 2, 1856 – December 13, 1931) was a prominent Armenian-American entrepreneur and philanthropist. Born in Hussenig, near Harput in the Ottoman Empire (present-day Elazığ, Turkey), Bogigian emigrated to the United States in 1882, seeking refuge from persecution and better economic opportunities. He became a successful antique and rug merchant and was located across the state house in Massachusetts.

== Background ==
Settling in Worcester, Massachusetts, he worked various jobs before establishing a successful import business specializing in Middle Eastern goods, particularly Armenian rugs and textiles. His entrepreneurial success allowed him to amass significant wealth, which he used to support numerous charitable causes.

Bogigian was deeply committed to aiding his fellow Armenians, especially those affected by the Armenian Genocide. He donated generously to relief efforts, supported orphanages, and contributed to rebuilding Armenian communities in the diaspora. Additionally, he funded scholarships and supported educational and cultural institutions, promoting Armenian heritage and assisting Armenian students.

Known for his humility and dedication to philanthropy, Bogigian lived modestly despite his success. His legacy endures through the many institutions and initiatives he supported, making him a revered figure in the Armenian-American community. He helped educational institutions, establishing full scholarships for worthy, young Armenian women at Wilson College in Pennsylvania; Mount Holyoke College in western Massachusetts; and Pomona College in California and many others.

== See also ==
- Armenian Americans in Massachusetts
