= Hood Rubber Company =

Rubber and shoes manufacturer in Massachusetts

- Type: Private
- Industry: Shoes/Rubber
- Founded: 1896
- Founder: Frederic C. Hood, Arthur N. Hood
- Defunct: 1969
- Headquarters: Watertown, Massachusetts, U.S.A.
- Key people: George Henry Hood, Frederic C. Hood, Arthur N. Hood
- Number of employees: 8450

The Hood Rubber Company was a rubber and shoes manufacturing company based in Watertown, Massachusetts. The company was founded in 1896 by Frederic C. Hood and Arthur N. Hood. It merged with the B. F. Goodrich Company in 1929 to become a solely owned subsidiary of The B. F. Goodrich Company and continued to manufacture Hood and B. F. Goodrich footwear brands until the plant closing in 1969.

== History ==
=== Background ===
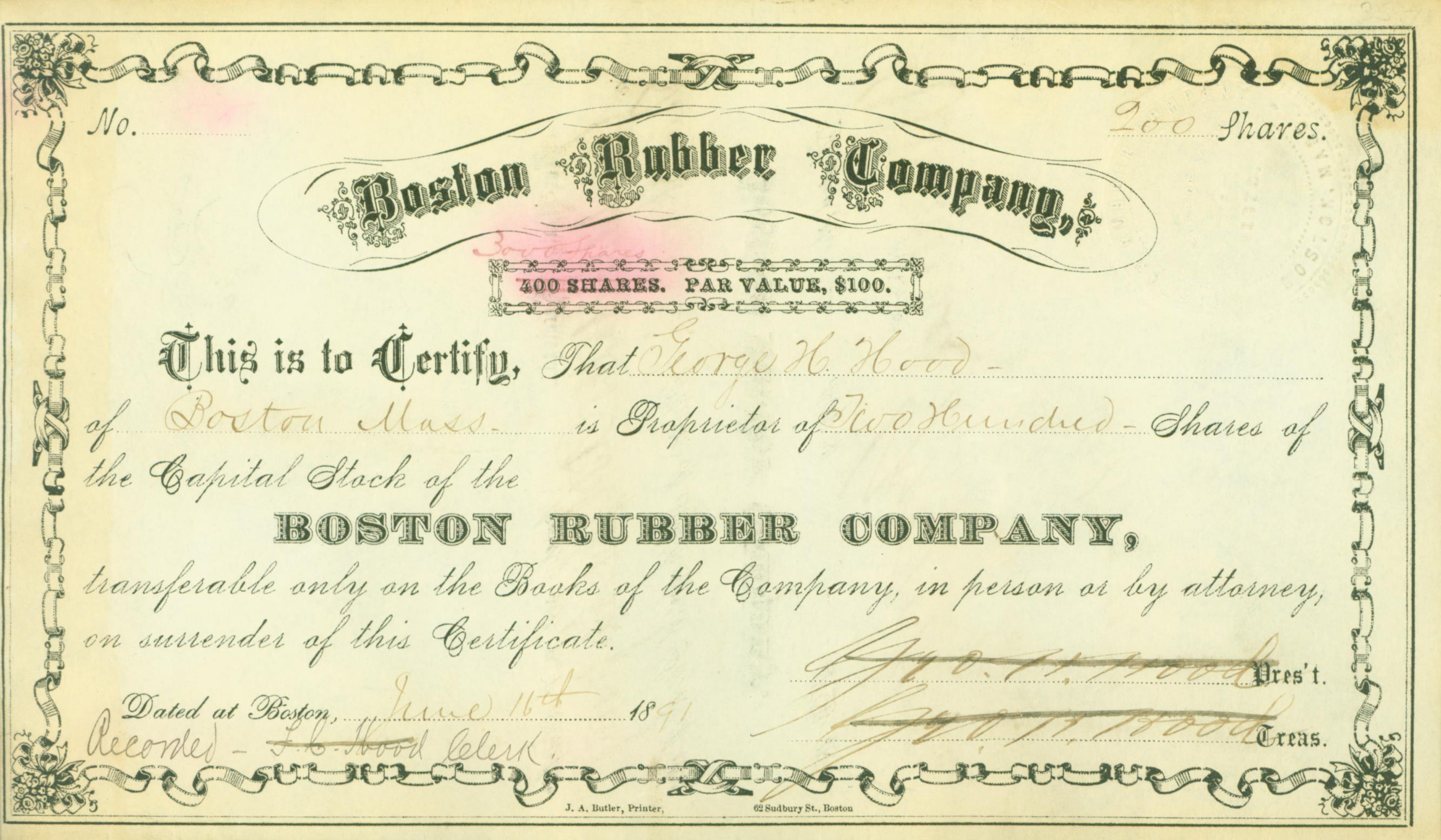
George Henry Hood was the owner of this share of the Boston Rubber Company, issued 16 June 1891.

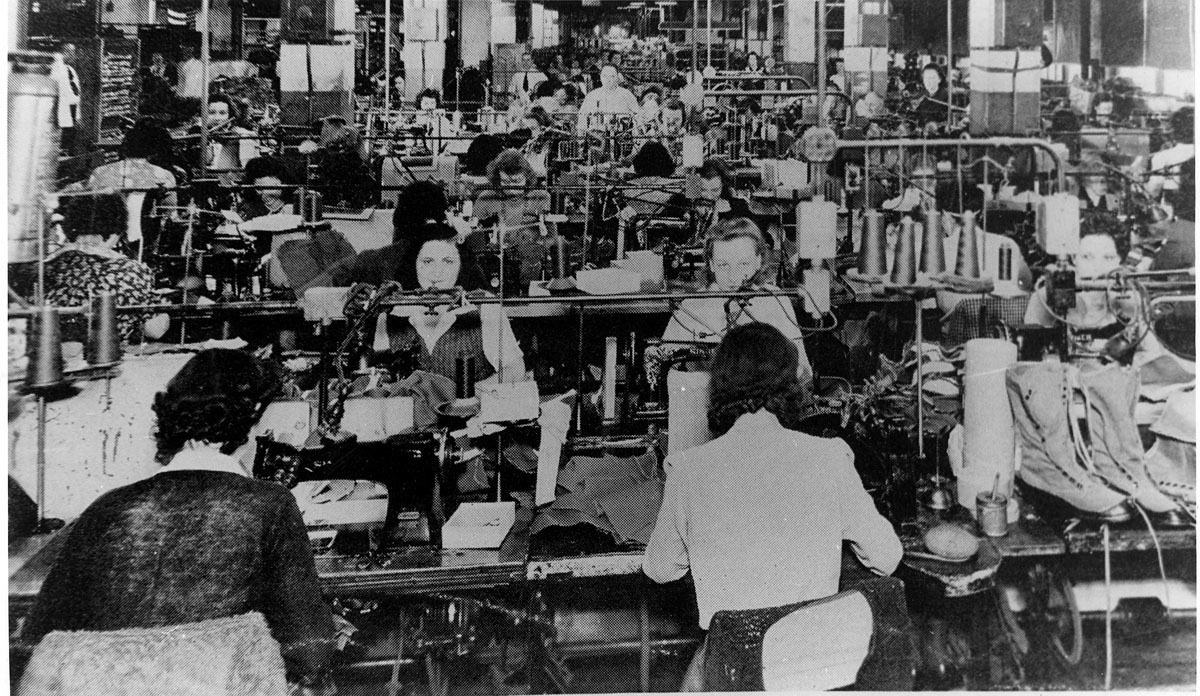
Hood Rubber Company in Watertown, MA where many Armenian immigrants worked in the early 1900s.

George Henry Hood was a veteran in the American rubber industry who started his rubber business establishing Boston Rubber Company in 1877, with a plant in Chelsea, Massachusetts. He manufactured rubber footwear in 1887 by acquiring the assets and machinery of a defunct rubber footwear factory in Franklin, Massachusetts, at an auction. With the help of his sons, Frederic Clark Hood and Arthur Needham Hood, G.H. Hood began the production of rubber footwear under the Boston Rubber Co. name. In 1892, Boston Rubber Co. and ten other rubber manufacturers consolidated operations under the name, United States Rubber Company, forming with the first Rubber Trust in the United States. G.H. Hood retired in 1892 when his sons established Hood Rubber Company.

In the early 1900s many Armenians worked in the Hood Rubber Company as their first job.

=== Formation ===
On October 12, 1892 the Hood Rubber Company was incorporated with $50,000. The incorporating directors included Albert D. Bossom, Frederic C. Hood, Arthur N. Hood, Augustus L. Thorndike, and Myra T. Hood. On November 12, 1896, the company opened 67,564 square-foot manufacturing plant with 225 employees in Watertown, Massachusetts.

=== Footwear production ===
Pioneering in innovations, during 1897, A. N. Hood developed an inventory and cost analysis system which estimated the costs of individual manufacturing parts and articles, calculating an operating cost on a monthly basis. In 1898, the company introduced a new rubber boot line called the "Tuff Boot." The boot was lighter than the other pull-on boots of that time. In 1901, Hood Rubber Company introduced a line of shoes called “Rolled Edge” wherein the edge of the sole was rolled up all around the shoe thereby giving better protection against abrasive wear at the toe and heel.

In 1904, Dr. Carl Otto Weber, an English scientist joined the company to establish a rubber laboratory for the company in Boston and was operated under the name India Rubber Research Laboratory.

In 1909, the Company developed new types and styles of the canvas rubber-soled shoes and tennis shoes or sneaks.

Through the first two decades of the 20th century, Hood manufactured different styles of basketball shoes including the Centre and the Hyscore, which were some of Hood's earliest basketball specific shoes. The popular basketball style produced with a buffed "Smokrepe” crepe rubber sole with a ribbed reinforced toe bumper and sponge cushioned heel was originated by Hood.

The Hood Conference Basket Ball Shoe was initially introduced in 1933. The Hood Conference “P-F” Basketball Shoe in 1948, with patented “P-F” (Posture Foundation) arch support, many versions of the Hood "P-F" Conference basketball shoes developed for men and woman over the next decade.

=== Wartime production ===
At the beginning of the First World War in 1914, the company was called upon to supply trench boots for the French and English armies. The pressure cured rubber boots proved to be especially adaptable for the wet and muddy environment of trench warfare. During the Second World War, it was enlisted by the United States Armed Forces to manufacture many types of rubber products, especially military boots for both the Pacific and European theaters.

In July 1929, the Company patented first puncture resistant rubber outsole for work shoes.

=== Automobile tires and tubes ===
In 1906, Hood Rubber Company ventured into manufacturing automobile tires and tubes. A new company, the Shawmut Tire Company, was formed in 1907 to operate under the management of Frederik C. Hood and A. N. Hood and was supplied materials and labor by The Hood Rubber Company to produce tires. By 1909, due to the increasing price of raw rubber, the manufacture and sale of tires by Shawmut was proved unsuccessful leading to the closure of the Shawmut Tire Company brand in 1912. They sold pneumatic and solid tires under the parent company – Hood Rubber Company.

=== Merger ===
On August 31, 1929, Hood Rubber Company was merged into The B. F. Goodrich Company. The B. F. Goodrich Co. transferred the management of all B.F. Goodrich footwear manufacturing activities to the Hood Rubber's Watertown plant.

== Awards ==
The Army-Navy "E" Award was an honor presented to companies during World War II whose production facilities achieved "Excellence in Production" of war equipment. Hood Rubber Co. received four Army-Navy "E" for Excellence between 1941 and 1945.
