= Carolyn Mugar =

Armenian-American activist

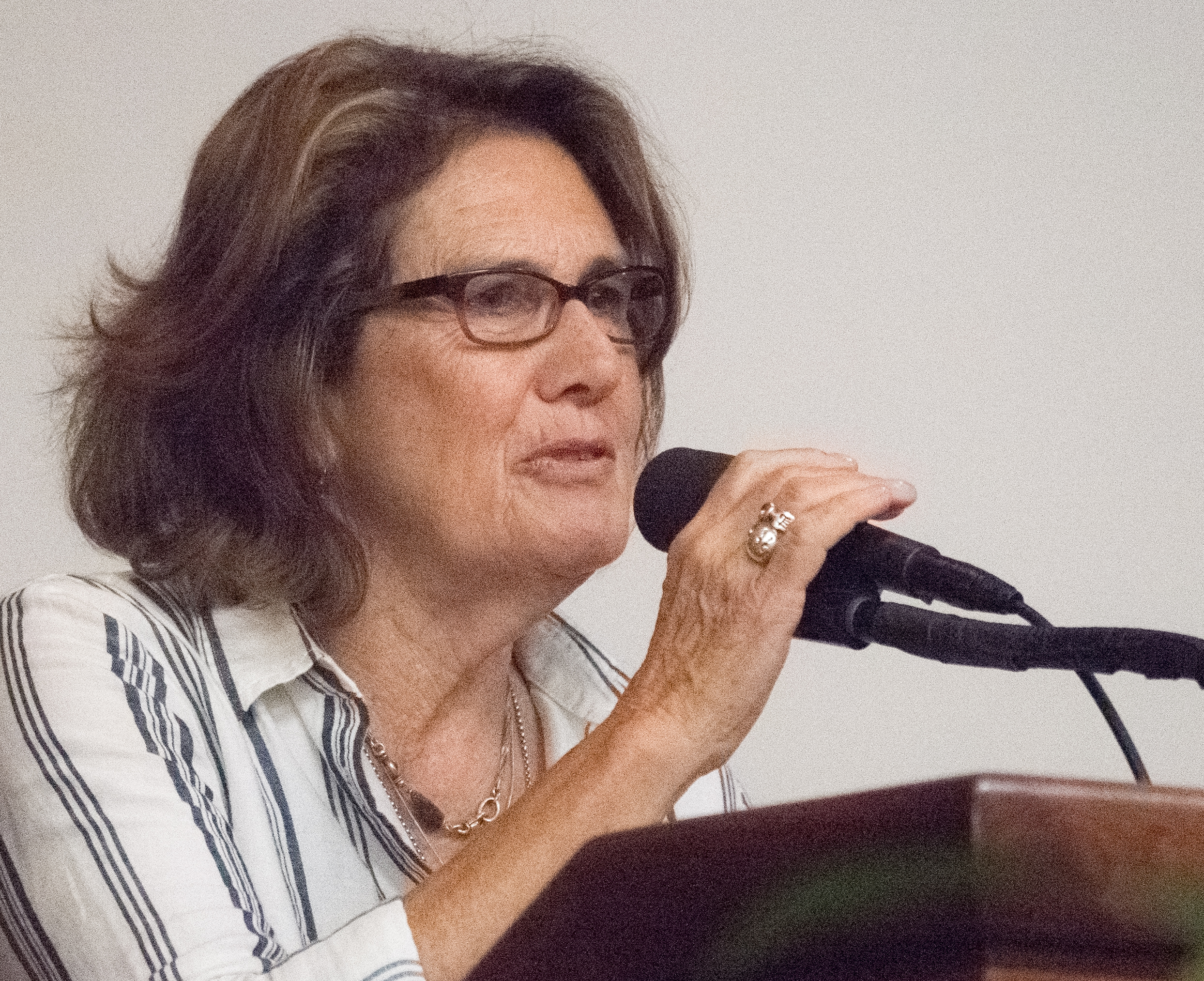
- Occupation: Activist
- Known for: Armenia Tree Project (founder); Farm Aid (executive director)
- Spouse: John T. O’Connor (m. 1989; died 2001)
- Father: Stephen P. Mugar
- Relatives: David G. Mugar (brother)

Carolyn Mugar (born c. 1943) is an American activist of Armenian descent, best known for founding the Armenia Tree Project and for serving as the executive director of Farm Aid. She is a prominent member of the Mugar family of Greater Boston.

== Biography ==
Mugar is the daughter of Stephen P. Mugar (1901–1982), founder of Star Market and a prominent Boston-area philanthropist. Her brother, businessman David G. Mugar (1939–2022), owned a Boston-area television station and was closely associated with Boston's annual Fourth of July celebration. Mugar's husband, businessman and activist John T. O’Connor, died in November 2001 of a heart attack, aged 46.

Mugar founded the Armenia Tree Project with her husband in 1994 as a result of the environmental problems caused by the then-recent earthquake and the blockade of Armenia by Azerbaijan and Turkey.

Mugar was handpicked to be the executive director of Farm Aid by one of its founders, Willie Nelson. She has also served as president of the Armenian Assembly of America.

In 2015, Mugar received an Honorary Doctor of Public Service from Suffolk University, the same university from which her father received an honorary degree.
