= My Forest Armenia =

- Իմ Անտառ Հայաստան
- Formation: 2019
- Type: Nonprofit
- Purpose: Reforestation
- Headquarters: Yerevan
- Region served: Armenia
- Founder: Andre Gumuchdjian
- Website: myforestarmenia.org

My Forest Armenia (Armenian: Իմ Անտառ Հայաստան, romanized: Im Antar Hayastan) is a non-profit organization founded in 2019, in Yerevan, Armenia. The organization was established with the initial goal of offsetting carbon emissions from burning fossil fuels, which was carried out through reforestation and afforestation efforts in the Lori and Tavush provinces of Armenia. The organization planted 910,000 trees in Armenia in 2023.

== Mission and vision ==
My Forest Armenia's mission is to sustainably increase forest coverage, combat environmental challenges like carbon emissions, soil erosion, and desertification, and preserve biodiversity. The organization aims to empower local communities under the guidance of scientists and expert foresters.

== History and founding ==
In its early stages, My Forest Armenia focused on carbon offsetting, but as the project evolved, Andre Gumuchdjian, founder and current CEO, recognized the vital role of forests in supporting life on Earth. Understanding the complexity of ecosystems and the essential services provided by forests, the organization's mission expanded to sustainable afforestation.

=== Development and expansion ===
The organization has grown to a team of 50 people, with up to 240 individuals joining during planting and maintenance seasons. The team comprises professionals from various fields.

In collaboration with the Armenian National Agrarian University, My Forest Armenia established a greenhouse dedicated to growing tree seedlings and serving educational and research purposes. The organization's initiatives significantly contribute to improving the quality of life and socio-economic conditions in the regions they operate.

In collaboration with Armenia Tree Project and Shen, the organization co-founded the Armenia Forest Alliance in 2021.

=== Milestones ===
My Forest Armenia initiated its first planting in Shirakamut, Lori, in November 2020, and by April 2021, they had planted 140,000 trees. The organization's goal is to plant 800,000 trees annually, with a commitment to sustainable practices and community empowerment.

The organization's impact goes beyond afforestation; it positively influences local communities by creating jobs and fostering economic activities such as eco-tourism and beekeeping.

==== Recent accomplishments ====
The fall planting season of 2023 marked a milestone for My Forest Armenia. With a team of 240 tree planters, foremen, and drivers, the organization planted a record-breaking 583,513 trees and shrubs. In total, 910,303 trees were planted in 2023, representing various species, including Caucasian oak, wild pear, pine, birch, wild apple, and others.

The organization collaborates with volunteers and corporate partners, such as One Tree Planted, UN Armenia, and the Children of Armenia Fund (COAF), among many other partners, in achieving their goals. The Central Bank of Armenia and the Union of Banks of Armenia together planted 160,000 trees on 50 hectares of land on the occasion of the 30th Anniversary of the Armenian dram.

== See also ==
- Armenia Tree Project
- Armenian Environmental Network
- Geography of Armenia
- Social issues in Armenia
