= Mugar family =

Armenian-American business family

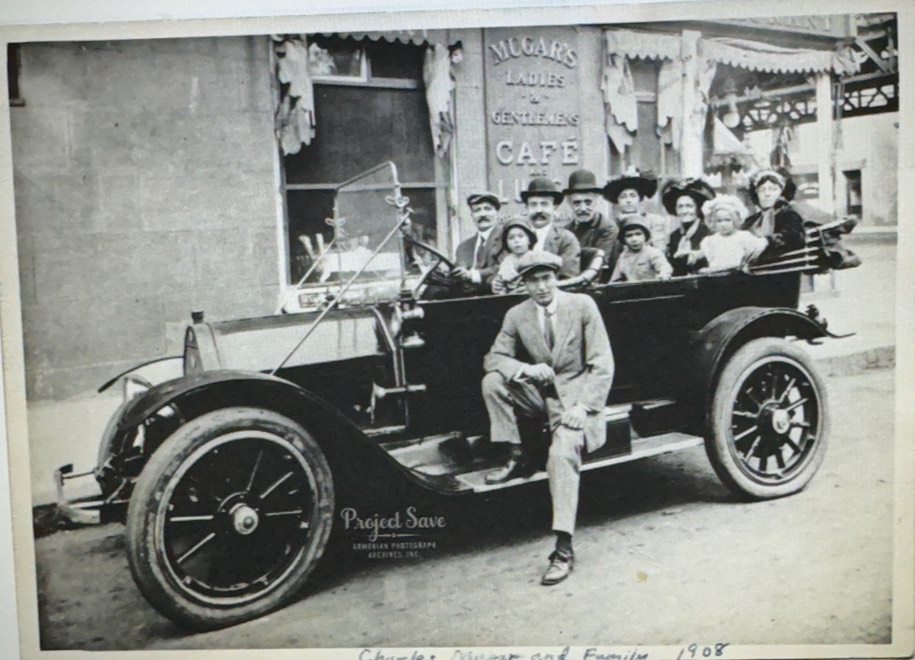
Mugar family by their cafe in Boston, 1908

The Mugar family of Greater Boston, Massachusetts, is an Armenian-American family in New England business and in philanthropy, both in the United States and Armenia. The best known member of the family is Stephen P. Mugar (1901–1982), who founded the Star Market chain of supermarkets on which the family fortune was based. In its May 2004 issue, Boston magazine ranked the Mugar family sixth in its list of the 50 most influential Boston families.

== Family origin ==
The first family members to arrive in Boston were brothers, Charles and Martin Mugar (shortened from Mugardichian), who came from Kharpert, Ottoman Empire, in 1904. They were joined in 1906 by their brothers, Arthur, Gregory and Sarkis Mugar, along with Sarkis Mugar's wife and three children, one of whom was Stephen P. Mugar.

== Family members ==
- Stephen P. Mugar, (1901–1982) founder of the Star Market chain
- John M. Mugar, (1914–2007), son of Martin, President and Chairman of the Star Market chain.
- David G. Mugar, (1939–2022), Stephen's son, also became a Star Market executive and was a prominent businessman and philanthropist in his own right.
- Carolyn Mugar, Stephen's daughter, activist, is founder of the Armenia Tree Project, executive director of Farm Aid and is the president of the Armenian Assembly of America.

== Philanthropies ==
The major objects of Mugar family philanthropic giving have been:

- Greater Boston educational institutions, especially the so-called "subway" or "commuter" colleges and universities, because they were the first to welcome young Armenian-Americans and others with limited resources and social standing and because they lacked the vast endowments of schools such as Harvard.
- Hospitals, in particular Cape Cod Hospital, and
- Armenian causes in the United States and overseas in Armenia and Lebanon.
- Boston's Fourth of July fireworks celebration—since the mid-1970s, closely associated with the Boston Pops concert at the Hatch Memorial Shell on the Esplanade
