= Armenian Environmental Network =

- Founded: 2007
- Type: Nonprofit organization
- Headquarters: Washington, D.C. United States

Armenian Environmental Network logo

Armenian Environmental Network (AEN), a project of Earth Island Institute (EII), is a non-profit organization headquartered in Washington, D.C. United States, with an office in Yerevan, Armenia.

== History ==
AEN was founded in 2007 as a response to a lack of environmental information available to Armenians in the Diaspora on environmental problems in Armenia. The Founder, Ursula Kazarian, and the Executive Director, Serda Ozbenian, are based in the United States. The Armenia office includes Armine Sargsyan, Armenia Office Director, and Armenuhi Nikoghosyan, Project Manager.

== Mission and objectives ==
AEN serves a dual mission to: (1) Increase information sharing and distribution among Armenians in Armenia, the Armenian Diaspora and the wider conservation community; and (2) Facilitate partnerships through the responsible involvement of Diasporan and international resources to promote sustainable development in Armenia. This way, AEN is active in environmental problems in Armenia, and also creates a dialogue between Armenia and the Diaspora.

In Armenia, AEN focuses on waste management through project implementation and education programs. The Vardenis Environmental Education Initiative (VEEI), part of AEN's Waste Management Program, was implemented with the goal of bringing environmental education into the classroom. Teachers of the Vardenis sub-region were trained on teaching methodologies, basic ecology, and waste management using the AEN Teacher's Guide, specifically developed for use in rural Armenia. Other projects include constructing Armenia's first modern landfill in the city of Berd. AEN also holds Youth Forums, which are designed to inform Armenia's youth from regions outside of Yerevan on environmental issues.

In the United States, AEN is working to expand its activities in cities with strong Armenian-American communities, with the hope to one day also expand to other Diasporan communities outside the U.S. AEN has organized environmental panel discussions in the U.S. since 2007, with topics ranging from deforestation and illegal logging to public health, water and sanitation, energy security, and the role of transparency in environmental work.

== See also ==
- Armenia Tree Project
- My Forest Armenia
