= Stephen P. Mugar =

Armenian-American businessman and philanthropist (1901–1982)

- Born: Stephen Pabbken Mugardichian; March 5, 1901; Kharpert, Ottoman Empire
- Died: October 16, 1982 (aged 81); Boston, Massachusetts, U.S.
- Occupation: Businessman
- Known for: Founder of Star Market; Boston-area philanthropy
- Spouse: Marian Graves
- Children: 2
- Relatives: John M. Mugar (cousin); David G. Mugar (son); Carolyn Mugar (daughter)

Stephen Pabbken Mugar (March 5, 1901 – October 16, 1982) was an Armenian businessman in the United States. He was the founder of the Star Market chain of supermarkets in New England. He was also a philanthropist, and is regarded as having been the most prominent member of the Mugar family of Greater Boston.

== Biography ==
Mugar was born March 5, 1901, in Kharpert (Harpoot) in the Mamuret-ul-Aziz Vilayet of the Ottoman Empire (present-day Turkey), of Armenian parents. His father, Sarkis, and mother, Vosgitel, and his two sisters, Alice and Mary, whose family name was shortened from Mugardichian, were Armenians who came to the United States from the Ottoman Empire in 1906 to join his father's brothers who owned a restaurant on Massachusetts Avenue in Boston. Another sister, Helen, was born after their arrival in Massachusetts. The 1910 United States census shows the family in the 19th Ward of Boston and lists Sarkis Mugar's occupation as "waiter in restaurant." In 1916, Sarkis Mugar paid $800 ($23,670 in 2025) for the Star Market, a small grocery store at 28 Mt. Auburn Street in Watertown, and Stephen eventually went to work for his father in the store.

Sarkis Mugar died in June 1924, due to complications from an automobile accident. The death resulted in 23-year-old Stephen taking over the Star Market to support his mother, himself, and his sisters. The second Star Market was opened in Newtonville in 1932 and the third one was opened in Wellesley in 1937. In the 1930s, Stephen Mugar married Marian Graves (born June 29, 1901, in Saugus), and they had two children: David G. Mugar and Carolyn Mugar.

After the war ended and wartime restrictions and shortages were over, Stephen worked with his younger cousin John M. Mugar to expand Star Market throughout Greater Boston to meet the increased affluence and consumer demand. The second Star Market in Newtonville opened in 1948 and was the Mugar's first supermarket. It was the prototype of the other modern supermarkets that Stephen and John opened during this period. Meats and produce were packaged in cellophane wrappers to make them more appealing to consumers. A conveyor belt carried bags of groceries to a central pickup station by the parking lot. Customers, tired of no self-service at stores such as A&P, or self-service but little else at First National Stores (Finast), came from miles around to patronize the new Star Market.

Stephen and Marian Mugar lived in Watertown and later in Belmont for many years. The family business was based in Boston, then moved further out to Burlington. Stephen Mugar died at Massachusetts General Hospital in Boston on October 16, 1982, and was buried in Mount Auburn Cemetery. Marian Mugar died in Belmont on November 29, 1984, and was buried next to her husband. Their son David became a business leader and philanthropist in his own right, while their daughter Carolyn became an activist and went on to serve as executive director of Farm Aid and founded the Armenia Tree Project, a reforestation project in Armenia.

== Philanthropic giving ==
After making his fortune in the Star Market business, Stephen P. Mugar became a generous contributor to educational institutions and Armenian causes locally and abroad. These include:

Armenian Assembly of America

The Armenian Assembly of America is a non-profit group aimed at increased Armenian-American participation in the American democratic process as well as assisting in humanitarian and development programs in Armenia. Stephen Mugar gave generously during his lifetime and his estate in 1984 gave $1 million to help launch its endowment fund.

Mugar Hall at Tufts

The Mugar Hall at The Fletcher School of Law and Diplomacy at Tufts University was given in memory of his parents.

Mugar Library at Haigazian University

The Mugar Library at Haigazian University, an Armenian institution in Beirut, Lebanon, was given in memory of his parents.

Mugar Life Sciences Building at Northeastern

The Mugar Life Sciences Building at Northeastern University, which contains the Departments of Biology, Cellular and Molecular Biology, Behavioral Neuroscience, and Chemical Engineering, and laboratories and classrooms, was given in 1963 in memory of his parents.

Mugar Memorial Library

The Mugar Memorial Library at Boston University was given in memory of his parents.

== Legacy ==
Mugar Omni Theater

In 1985, David Mugar gave the money for the Marian G. and Stephen P. Mugar Omni Theater at the Museum of Science, Boston.

Armenian Library & Museum of America

In 1992, the former Coolidge Bank building in Watertown, which was bought by the Armenian Library and Museum of America in 1988, was dedicated to the memory of Stephen and Marian Mugar.

Mugar Building at Cape Cod Hospital

In 2002, David Mugar gave $5 million to the Cape Cod Hospital in Hyannis for a new four story wing in memory of Marian and Stephen.

Endowed Chair of Armenian Genocide Studies

Carolyn Mugar and her husband, John O'Connor, shortly before his death on November 30, 2002, made a gift to Clark University in Worcester to establish the Endowed Chair of Armenian Genocide Studies, which is named for "Robert Aram and Marianne Kaloosdian and Stephen and Marian Mugar." As of 2008, the holder of the chair was Taner Akcam.
