= Mugar Omni Theater =

Theater in Boston, Massachusetts, US

Coordinates: 42°22′07.29″N 71°04′11.53″W

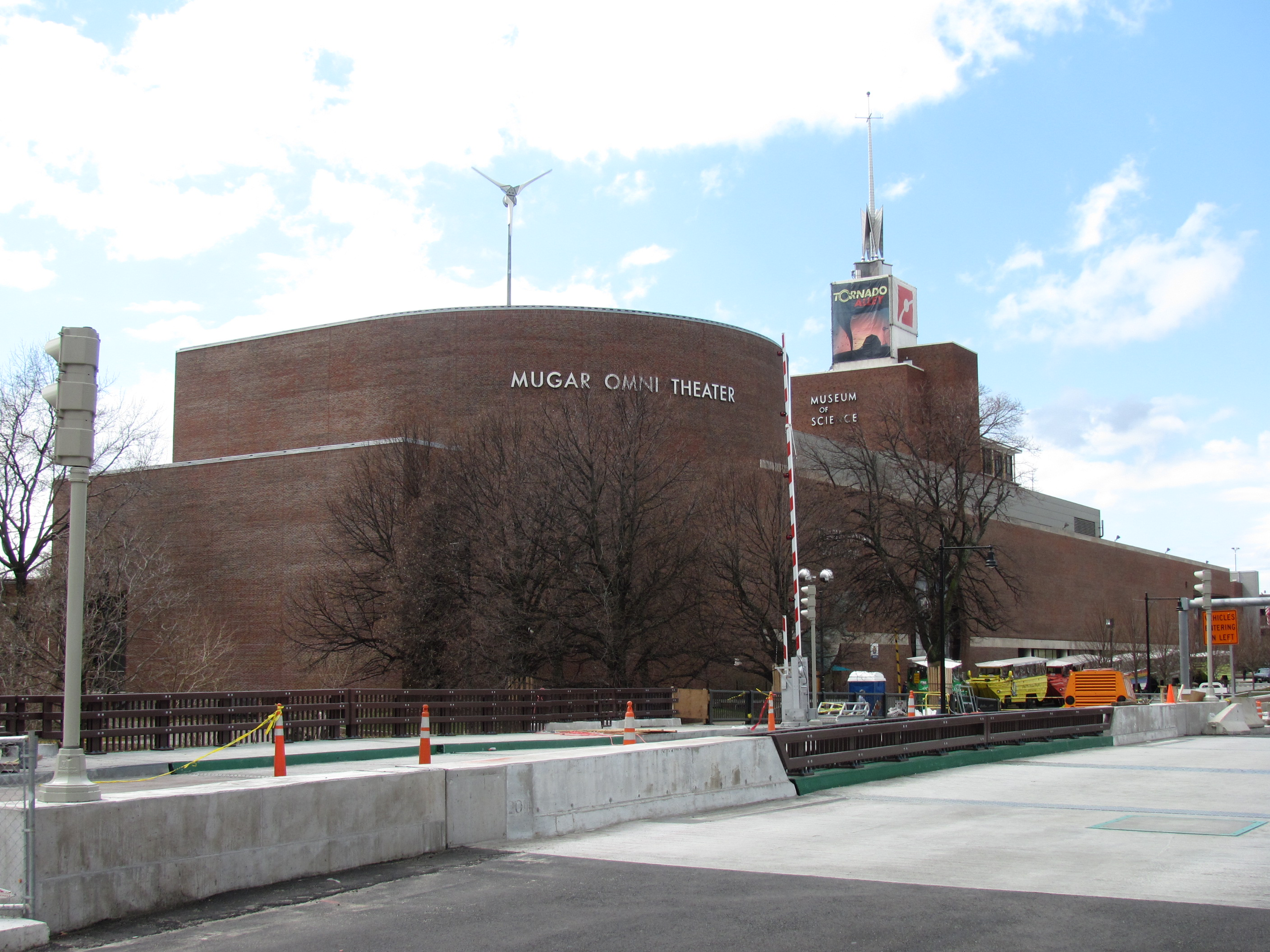
Mugar Omni Theater

The Mugar Omni Theater is a domed IMAX theater at the Museum of Science, in Boston, Massachusetts.

== Description ==
The Mugar Omni is named after Stephen P. Mugar, the founder of Star Market, and his wife Marian G. Mugar. The Mugar Omni is non-profit and opened in 1987. Over 900,000 visitors came in its first year. It is the only domed IMAX theater in New England and is one of only 60 IMAX Theaters in the world to offer 180 degree domed viewing. The seats are set at a steep (cliff-side) angle and recline about thirty degrees, the screen is five stories tall, and the theater is filled with an impressive surround sound system. Because the screen fills a viewer's field of vision (including periphery vision) the screen and surround sound system give viewers the feeling of immersion and motion giving visitors a unique life-like experience when viewing films. Viewers must turn their heads left to right up and down to capture all that is going on. The theater shows films of educational and scientific interest such as: Bears, Beavers, Amazing Caves, Shackleton's Antarctic Adventure as well as select IMAX feature film releases in 1.43:1 aspect ratio. Leonard Nimoy was a host of the opening of the theater.

In 2020, the original 70mm projection system was converted to an IMAX 4K digital projection system.
