= John M. Mugar =

Armenian-American businessman and philanthropist (1914 – 2007)

- Born: April 5, 1914; Boston, Massachusetts, U.S.
- Died: March 23, 2007 (aged 92); Gloucester, Massachusetts, U.S.
- Education: Tufts University
- Occupation: Business executive
- Employer: Star Market
- Spouse: Helen Mugar (née Gienandt)
- Children: 4
- Relatives: Stephen P. Mugar (cousin)

John Martin Mugar (April 5, 1914 – March 23, 2007) was an American business executive of Armenian descent. A member of the Mugar family of Greater Boston, he served as president and chairman of the Star Market chain of supermarkets.

== Biography ==
Mugar was born as Zaven Marderos DerMugarditchian on April 5, 1914, in Boston, son of Armenian immigrant Martin Mugar and his wife, Anna (née Chooljian). Mugar's ancestors had emigrated to America from Harpoot, Turkey, near the Euphrates River. His great-grandfather on his mother's side managed an orphanage in Armenia for missionaries of the American Congregational Church. His great-grandfather and 25 members of his family were killed in the Armenian genocide of 1915–1917.

Mugar grew up in the Boston area where his father and uncles managed a restaurant on the corner of Washington Street and Massachusetts Avenue in Boston known as Mugar's Cafe. At the age of 13, Mugar sold The Saturday Evening Post door to door and eventually managed a sales force of 20 boys, winning sales competitions that Curtis Publishing Company held in Boston. During the Great Depression, his father's restaurant closed and the family came on hard times. Mugar put his college plans on hold and took a full-time job working for his cousin Stephen P. Mugar at Star Market.

In 1933, after a year at Star Market, Mugar returned to school, first doing a post-graduate year at Berkeley Prep, where he was valedictorian, and then matriculating at Tufts University, where he majored in economics. He graduated magna cum laude in 1937. That same year, he returned to Star Market, which at the time had three stores. He was appointed treasurer and reduced expenses by 30%. In 1940, he became vice-president.

In February 1942, Mugar enlisted in the United States Navy. He was assigned to the Portsmouth Naval Shipyard in 1943, where he managed the commissary. It was at Portsmouth that he met his wife, Helen Gienandt, who was an ensign in the Navy Nurse Corps. Both were eventually shipped out to the Pacific Theater: Helen to New Guinea and John to Okinawa, where he was commissary officer of an amphibious unit, Acorn 44. Mugar finished his career in the Navy in March 1946. The couple went on to have three daughters and a son.

As vice-president, president, and finally chairman of the board of Star Market, Mugar helped take the company from a small chain of several stores to a major New England supermarket brand of more than 60 stores. Under his leadership, Star Market was the first to implement many innovations in the supermarket industry, such as unit pricing, meats wrapped in cellophane, in-store banks and florists, as well as installing conveyor belts that carried bags of groceries to a central pickup station at the store parking lot. He also instituted a profit sharing and retirement program for full-time and part-time employees.

Mugar instituted programs of work/study for his employees in association with local universities and was particularly interested in encouraging women to assume a greater role in management, which was evidenced by his instrumental role in the founding of the school of management at Simmons College in Boston. Mugar served actively as a Trustee of Tufts from 1966 to 1989, and was a trustee emeritus for the rest of his life. He also served on the board of the Fletcher School of Law and Diplomacy at Tufts.

Mugar and his wife couple lived in Belmont, Massachusetts, for many years before retiring to Marco Island, Florida. Later, they returned to Gloucester, Massachusetts, to live. Mugar died in Gloucester on March 23, 2007.

== Sources ==
- Francis Storr (October 14, 2012). "How Grocery Shoppers got Personal". Boston Globe Magazine.
- Sigrid Reddy Watson (February 12, 1999). "A Star before and after merger". Armenian Mirror Spectator. Archived from the original on October 10, 2007.
- Lynn Callison (February 1987). "Perspective on the "Supermarket" Revolution" (PDF). Journal of Food Distribution Research.
- "Star Market 100 years". Star Market Website. July 2015.
- Edgar B Herwick. "How did Star end up over the Mass Pike".
- Jones, Geoffrey; Morgan, Nicholas, eds. (1994). Adding Value: Brands and Marketing in Food and Drink. Routledge. ISBN 0-415-09516-6.
