= Armenia Tree Project =

Organization

Armenia Tree Project (ATP)
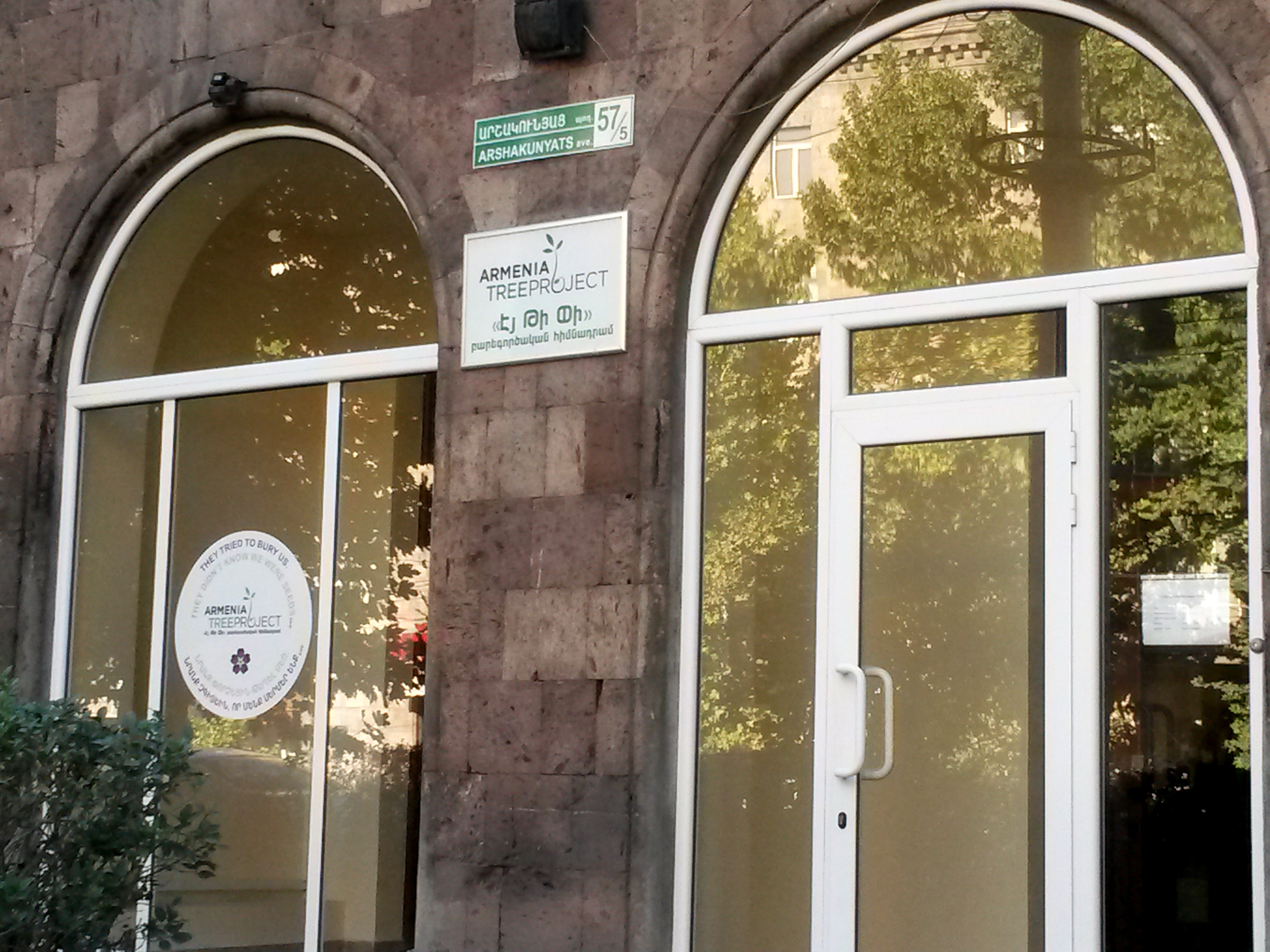
- Yerevan headquarters
- Formation: 1994
- Founder: Carolyn Mugar
- Headquarters: Yerevan, Armenia and Woburn, Massachusetts
- Services: Environmental education and advocacy, reforestation, community development
- Executive Director: Jeanmarie Papelian
- Operations Manager in Armenia: Rousanne Arustamyan
- Parent organization: Armenian Assembly of America
- Staff: 80
- Website: armeniatree.org

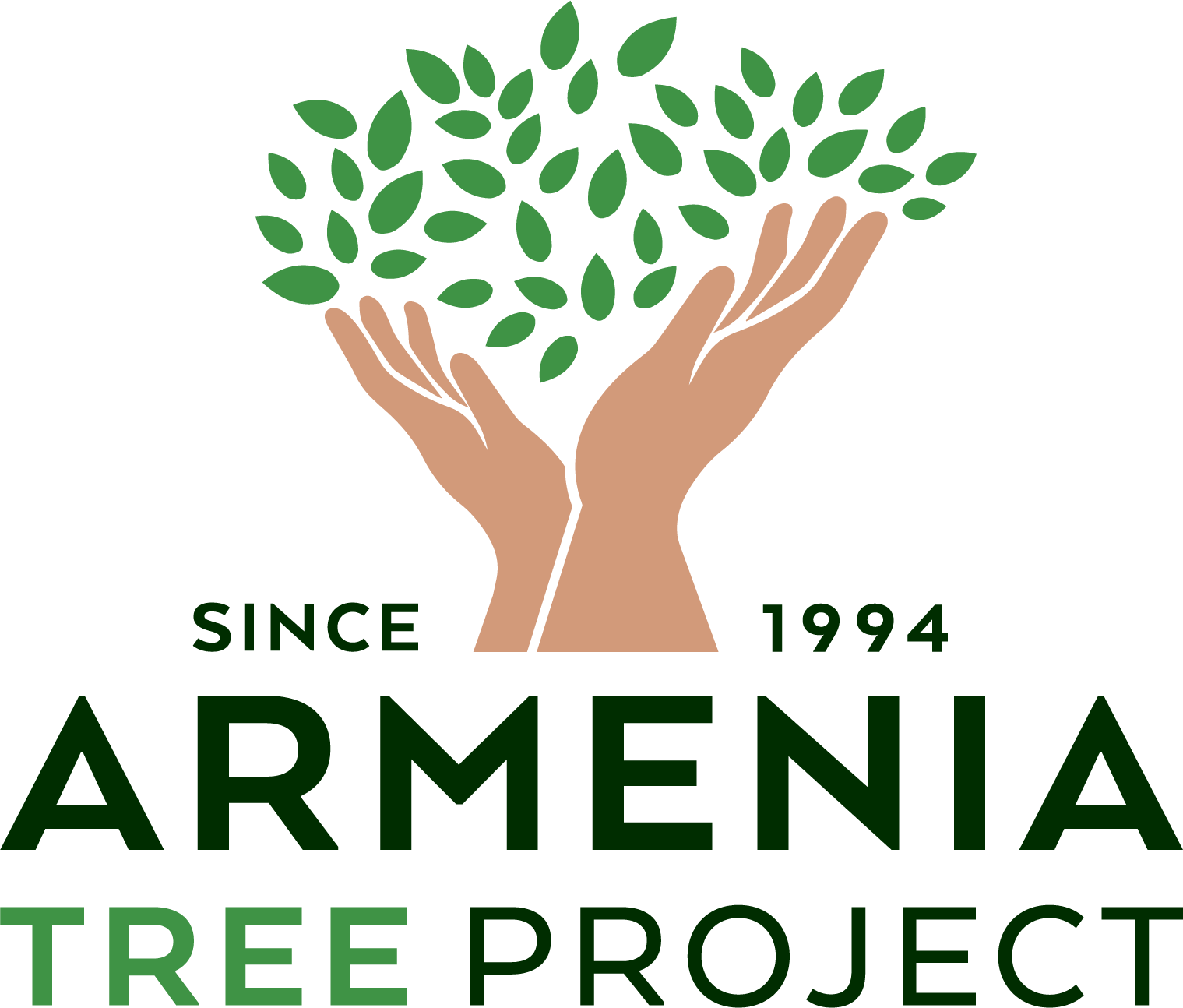
Armenia Tree Project logo

Armenia Tree Project (ATP) is a non-profit organization based in Watertown, Massachusetts, United States, and Yerevan, Armenia, founded in 1994 by Carolyn Mugar to promote Armenia's socioeconomic development through reforestation. Since its founding, the organization has planted more than 8 million trees in communities throughout Armenia.

The organization has a full-time staff of 70 in Armenia. The Yerevan branch manages four state-of-the-art tree nurseries, two environmental education centers, and partners with families to create tree-based small business opportunities. Its major program initiatives include planting trees at urban and rural sites, environmental education and advocacy, community development and poverty reduction.

== Environmental challenge ==
When Carolyn Mugar, from Boston, visited Armenia in 1992, the country had been impoverished by an energy embargo imposed during the First Nagorno-Karabakh War. Armenians had previously depended upon natural gas for 90 percent of their energy needs, but their supply had been cut off by the embargo. Deforestation was particularly severe during the early 1990s, because many Armenians had only their trees as a fuel source during the winter. This condition raised a concern about whether land formerly protected by forest cover would become desert. A study in 2005 estimated Armenia's forest cover at 11.2 percent of its total land area, dropping to 8.2 percent by 2000. In 2012, the ATP reported the country's forest cover was down to only 7 percent.

In 1994, Carolyn Mugar established the Armenia Tree Project to address the environmental and economic disaster of Armenia's dwindling forests. The ATP was organized as a subsidiary of the Armenian Assembly of America, which continues to provide administrative assistance. Since its founding, the ATP has planted over 4.5 million trees throughout Armenia. As of 2014, the organization was operating three tree nurseries, providing full-time employment for 45 people, and fruit trees planted by its projects were producing an estimated harvest of over 300,000 pounds annually.

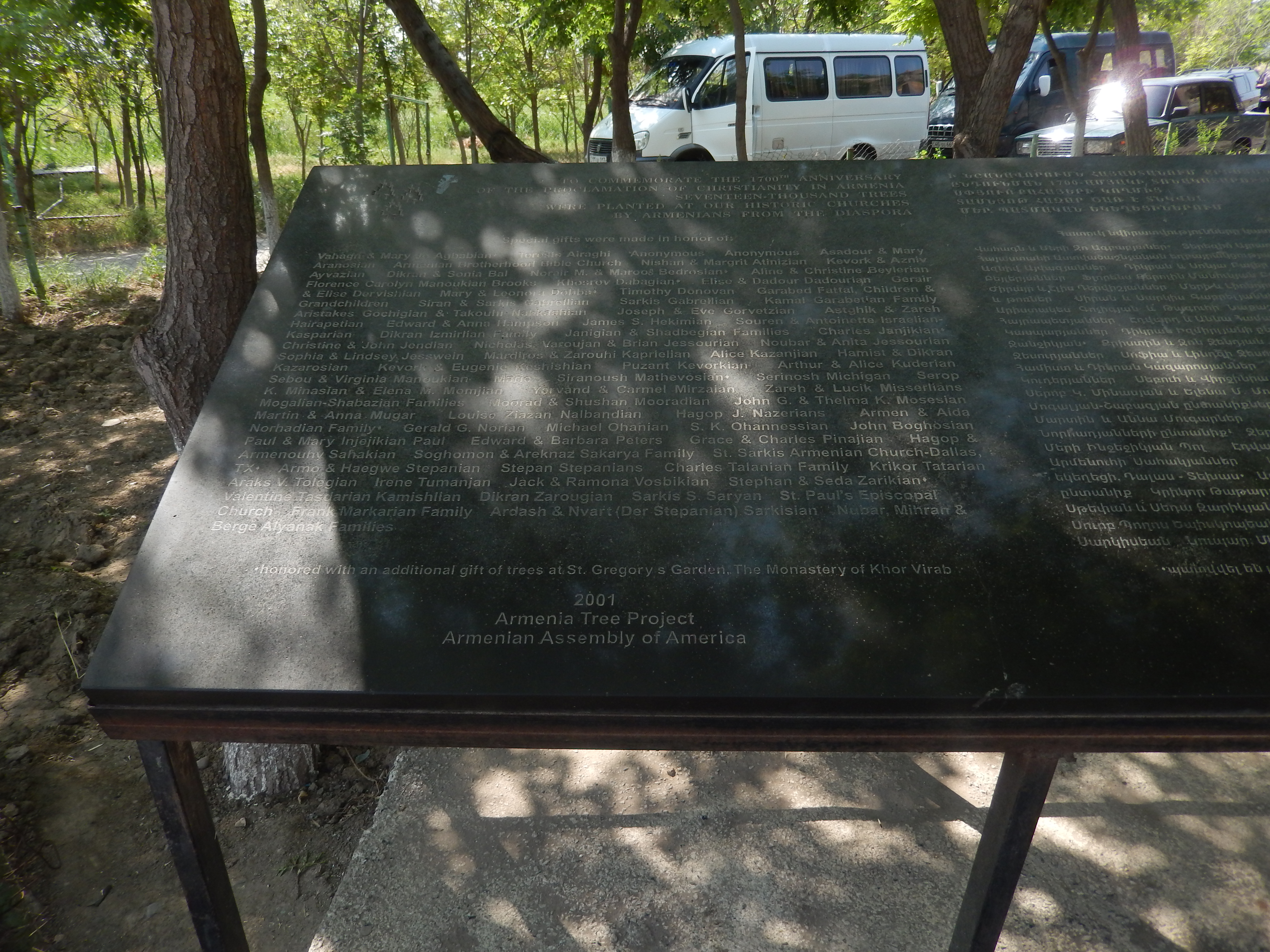
ATP plaque in Khor Virap

== ATP programs ==
The organization's mission emphasizes the use of trees to promote economic self-sufficiency, improving the Armenian standard of living while protecting the environment. Its urban and community tree planting programs work with cities and local neighborhoods to replant in public spaces such as in parks, school grounds and other public properties. In rural areas, farmers grow seedlings in their backyards for tree planting projects in northern Armenia.

In its environmental education and advocacy programs, ATP teaches the value of living in a healthy environment. The organization is seeking approval from the Ministry of Education to present an environmental studies curriculum for schools. Its poverty reduction and community development efforts direct funding to employ community residents in tree planting, and teach families to grow and tend seedlings in backyard nursery pots.

Building Bridges is an online program created by ATP for the children of Armenia. It allows them to explore their environmental heritage and play games where they plant their own virtual trees.

== Energy Globe Award ==
In 2008, the ATP's tree nursery micro-enterprise program, "Plant an Idea, Plant a Tree", was recognized as the national winner of the Energy Globe Award for Sustainability. Its nursery program was selected for the award from 853 environmental projects in 109 countries. Initiated as a pilot project in 2004, the program was designed to mitigate poverty-driven deforestation with support for tree nurseries owned by impoverished families in the Getik River Valley of northern Armenia. It began with 17 families operating tree nurseries in 2004, growing to 400 families by 2008.

== Volunteer participation ==
ATP recruits volunteers with assistance from Birthright Armenia / Depi Hayk Foundation. A limited number of volunteer summer positions are available in public relations and outreach, environmental education, and the SEEDS program. The organization also hires 75 to 100 seasonal workers each year for large-scale reforestation projects.

== See also ==
- Armenian Environmental Network
- Geography of Armenia
- My Forest Armenia
- Social issues in Armenia
