= NSTAR (company) =

Former utility company in Massachusetts

- Company type: Subsidiary
- Industry: Utility
- Founded: 1999
- Fate: Merged with Northeast Utilities and rebranded as Eversource Energy
- Headquarters: Westwood, Massachusetts, United States
- Area served: Eastern and Central Massachusetts
- Products: Electricity generation, transmission and distribution; Natural gas distribution
- Parent: Northeast Utilities
- Website: Defunct

NSTAR was a utility company that provided retail electricity and natural gas to 1.4 million customers in eastern and central Massachusetts, including the Boston urban area. NSTAR became a subsidiary of Northeast Utilities in April 2012. In February 2015, Northeast Utilities and all of its operating companies (Western Massachusetts Electric, Public Service New Hampshire, Connecticut Light and Power, Yankee Gas, and NSTAR Gas and Electric) became one large company known as Eversource Energy.

== History ==
NSTAR was formed in 1999 by the merger of BEC Energy and Commonwealth Energy System and had the following operating units: Boston Edison Company, Cambridge Electric Light Company, Commonwealth Electric Company, and NSTAR Gas Company (formerly Commonwealth Gas and Cambridge Gas Company).

As a part of deregulation of the local electrical power industry, NSTAR has divested itself of all electric generation facilities, keeping only those elements of the business which remain regulated. NSTAR sold its interest in the Seabrook Station nuclear power plant to FPL Group in 2002.

On November 16, 2006, the company announced a 7.4% increase in its dividend to an annual rate of USD1.30 per common share from the previous USD1.21.

NSTAR has ownership of unregulated district energy and telecommunications businesses, including Medical Area Total Energy Plant, LLC. which produces electricity, steam and chilled water for sale to customers in the Longwood Medical Area of Boston.

Electric power distribution in the New England area is coordinated by ISO New England, a regional transmission organization.

== Environmental record ==
In 2002, NSTAR Electric and Gas Corporation was cited by the Environmental Protection Agency (EPA) for discharging oil into the Charles River. The EPA also stated that NSTAR had failed to prepare spill plans at four of its facilities, in Brighton, Cambridge, Needham, and West Roxbury, where oil is pumped through their pipe lines. In July 2007, NSTAR Electric introduced a new program called NSTAR Green. In May 2008, NSTAR Green signed ten-year contracts for sixty megawatts of wind power from two wind farms in New York and Maine. They offered their customers a chance to buy 50-100 percent of their power from these wind farms. Power purchased through NSTAR Green would reduce reliance on fossil fuels that are traditionally used to meet the region’s electricity demand.

=== PCB spill controversy ===
NSTAR has had its share of environmental mishaps, including nearly a dozen spills at its former Watertown, Massachusetts facility. The spills, most of which occurred during the 1980s, consisted of transformer oil, which contained PCBs in high concentrations (6,200 Parts Per million). These spills have contaminated nearby Sawins and Williams Pond, both of which are downgradient of the NSTAR facility, and possibly flowed into the Charles river, which is downstream of Sawins Pond. Many local activists lobbied for NSTAR to abide by state regulations and spend the $20–40 million required to perform a PCB remediation of the affected lands. By 1997 NSTAR was responsible for nearly 50 hazardous waste sites, and by 2006 all but 5 of these had been cleaned up.

== HVDC transmission ==
NSTAR has signed on a joint venture with Hydro-Québec and Northeast Utilities to build a new High-voltage direct current (HVDC) line from Windsor, Quebec (connecting with the Quebec - New England Transmission line) to a location in central New Hampshire. It is projected that the line will either run in existing right-of-way adjacent to the HVDC line that runs through New Hampshire, or it will connect to a right-of-way in northern New Hampshire that will run through the White Mountains. This 180- to 190-mile line, projected to carry 1,200 megawatts, will carry electricity to approximately one million homes.

== Merger with Northeast Utilities ==
In October 2010, Northeast Utilities and NSTAR announced they would merge, with the resulting company retaining the Northeast Utilities name. Under the terms of the transaction, NSTAR shareholders received 1.312 Northeast Utilities common shares for each NSTAR share that they own. The merger was completed in 2012. On February 2, 2015, Northeast Utilities and all its subsidiaries, including NSTAR, began to brand themselves as Eversource Energy.
