= Star Market =

Chain of supermarkets based in Boston, US

The Star Market Company
- Type: Subsidiary of Albertsons Companies, Inc.
- Industry: Retail
- Founded: 1915 (111 years ago) in Watertown, Massachusetts
- Founder: Sarkis Mugar
- Fate: Merged with Shaw's but brand revived under current ownership
- Products: Supermarkets/food-drug stores
- Parent: Albertsons Companies

Star Market is a New England chain of supermarkets based in Greater Boston. It was owned by the Mugar family and started in 1915. The company was sold to The Jewel Companies, Inc. in 1964 and later to Investcorp, which in turn sold the chain to Shaw's Supermarkets. As stores were remodeled, many adopted the Shaw's name, leaving only a handful of Star Market stores operating by the late 2000s. In 2008, Shaw's began to revive the name, a trend which was expedited after the parent company of both chains was sold to Cerberus Capital Management. Today, both Shaw's and Star Market are administered as a single division.

== History ==
=== Beginning ===
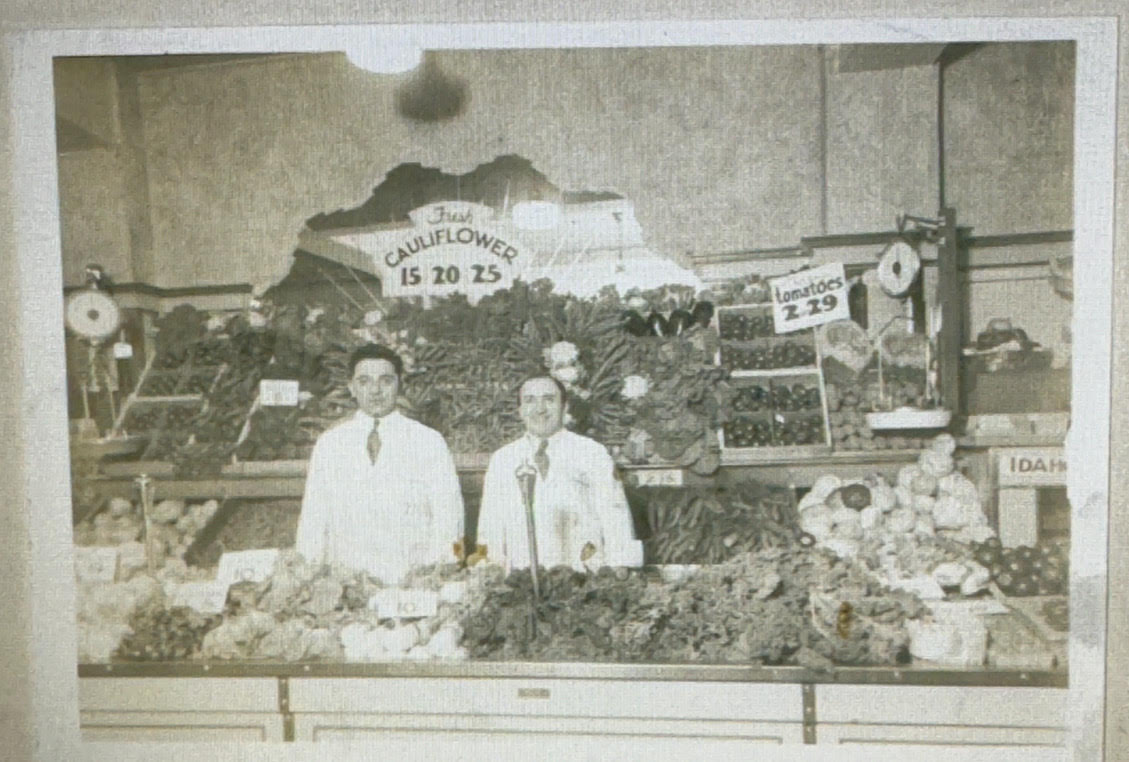
Myron Kelligian and Archie Pilibosian - Star Market, Watertown, MA. 1934

In 1915, Sarkis Mugar, an Armenian immigrant who had arrived in Greater Boston in 1906, paid $800.00 for the Star Market, a small grocery store originally known as the Big Bear market at least until 1944, at 28 Mt. Auburn Street in Watertown. His son Stephen P. Mugar (1901–1984) eventually went to work for him in the store. In 1922, Sarkis Mugar was killed in an automobile accident, leaving his son to take over Star Market to support his mother and sisters. In the early 1930s, Stephen hired his first cousin, John M. Mugar, who later became president and chairman of Star Market.

=== Pre-war and post-war expansion ===
The second Star Market opened in Newtonville in 1932, and the third store opened in Wellesley in 1937. John Mugar joined Stephen Mugar in management, but had to leave to serve in the U.S. Navy during World War II.

After the war ended, John Mugar returned to the management of Star Market. With wartime restrictions and shortages over, Stephen and John were ready to expand throughout Greater Boston to meet the increased affluence and consumer demand. The second Star Market in Newtonville opened in 1948 and was the Mugars' first supermarket. The new supermarket served as a prototype for the other modern supermarkets that they would soon open during this period. Meats and produce were packaged in cellophane wrappers to make them more appealing to consumers, and a conveyor belt carried bags of groceries to a central pickup station by the parking lot.

=== Sale to the Jewel Companies ===
In 1961, Star Market acquired Brigham's Ice Cream, a popular ice cream shop in New England. In 1964, the Star Market Company was acquired by Chicago-based Jewel Companies, Inc., though Jewel chose to retain the original name and identity of Star Market. The Mugar family retained the real estate and codeveloped additional locations. Jewel also retained John M. Mugar as president, and later as chairman, until his retirement in 1978. While Jewel owned Star Market, it built many combination food and drug stores that it branded as Star-Osco, with common checkstands but separate management teams. Jewel also combined Star Market with Turn Style to form Turn Style/Star Market Family Centers, which included a Star Market, an Osco Drug, a Turn Style, and a Brigham's Ice Cream Shop.

=== After the Jewel acquisition ===
After Jewel was acquired by American Stores in 1984, the Star-Osco stores were rebranded as Star Market and placed under a single management team. After the Jewel acquisition, American Stores had debt to pay off. In order to pay off this debt, American Stores chose to sell its less profitable stores, including the Star Market. They found a buyer for Star Market, and sold it to Investcorp in 1994.

The Star Market-Osco Drug connection was ended for a time. This particular sale was led by Henry Nasella, the former president of Star Market, who had previously spent six years as president and COO of Staples before returning to Star. After the purchase by Investcorp, Nasella served as the chairman and CEO of Star Market, expanding the supermarket chain to include specialty brands such as Wild Harvest. In 1999, Investcorp sold Star Market to Sainsbury's for $490 million. Sainsbury's merged the chain with Shaw's Supermarkets to form Shaw's-Star Market.

In 2004, Albertsons, Inc. bought Sainsbury's American supermarket assets, including Star Market, after which Star Market and Osco Drug were reunited under one corporate umbrella. On June 2, 2006, a partnership of SuperValu, CVS Corporation, and several investment firms, including Cerberus Capital Management, acquired Albertsons with the intent to divvy up the pieces. SuperValu received both Shaw's and Star Market.

In 2008, Shaw's announced that their Boston area stores were reverting to the Star Market name due to local history. On August 22, 2008, the former Shaw's Market at 1065 Commonwealth Avenue in Allston had its official grand reopening as a Star Market—more than eight years after its name had been changed from Star Market to Shaw's. The Brighton Mills store on Western Avenue, the Auburndale store on Commonwealth Avenue, and a new store in Chestnut Hill also were reopened as Star Markets in July 2008. A year later, in 2009, the Star Market on Beacon Street in Somerville reopened. As of August 2015, there are 22 stores that have been rebranded as Star Markets—primarily in the immediate Boston vicinity, but also on Cape Cod and the South Shore.

== See also ==
- Brigham's Ice Cream
- Jewel Food Stores
- Osco Drug
- Shaw's and Star Market
