= Sanderson House =

Sanderson House may refer to:

- John Sanderson House, Waltham, Massachusetts
- Nathan Sanderson I House, Waltham, Massachusetts
- Nathan Sanderson II House, Waltham, Massachusetts
- Hagar–Smith–Livermore–Sanderson House, Waltham, Massachusetts
- Sanderson–Clark Farmhouse, Waltham, Massachusetts
- Sanderson House (Scottholm Terrace, Syracuse, New York), at 112 Scottholm Terrace
- Sanderson House (Scottholm Boulevard, Syracuse, New York), at 301 Scottholm Boulevard
- Sanderson House (Pollocksville, North Carolina)
- Nielsen-Sanderson House, Draper, Utah
