= Lexington =

Lexington or The Lexington may refer to:

== Places ==
=== Canada ===
- Lexington, a district in Waterloo, Ontario

=== United States ===
- Lexington, Kentucky, the most populous city with this name
- Lexington, Massachusetts, the oldest municipality with this name in the United States, and site of the first battle of the American Revolutionary War
- Lexington, Alabama, a town
- Lexington, California, now a ghost town
- Lexington, Georgia, a city
- Lexington, Illinois, a city
- Lexington, Indiana, an unincorporated community
- Lexington, Carroll County, Indiana, an unincorporated community
- Lexington, Kansas, now a ghost town
- Lexington, Maine, a township
- Lexington Township, Michigan
  - Lexington, Michigan, a village within the township
- Lexington, Minnesota, a city
- Lexington, Mississippi, a city
- Lexington, Missouri, a city
- Lexington, Nebraska, a city
- Lexington, New York, a town
- Lexington, North Carolina, a city
- Lexington, Ohio, a village
- Lexington, Oklahoma, a city
- Lexington, Oregon, a city
- Lexington, South Carolina, a town
- Lexington County, South Carolina
- Lexington, Tennessee, a city
- Lexington, Texas, a town
- Lexington, Virginia, a city
- Lexington (plantation), Virginia, an archaeological site
- Lexington, Washington, a census-designated place
- Lexington Avenue (Manhattan), a street in New York City

=== Former ===
- Laxton, Nottinghamshire in England, formerly Lexington

== People ==
See also the spelling Lexinton.

- Henry of Lexington, medieval Bishop of Lincoln
- John Lexington, 13th century English baron
- Lexington Steele, American pornographic actor
- Stephen of Lexington, English Cistercian monk

== Ships ==
- Lexington-class aircraft carrier, the first operational aircraft carrier class in the United States Navy
- SS Lexington, the name of several steamships
- USS Lexington, the name of various United States Navy ships

== Other uses ==
- Battles of Lexington and Concord, the first battles of the American Revolutionary War
- Lexington (automobile), an early automobile
- Lexington (cigarette), a Luxembourgish brand
- Lexington (horse), a 19th-century champion racehorse
- Lexington Partners, a private equity firm
- Lexington Queen, a dance club in Tokyo
- Lexington Tower, a summit in Washington state
- The Lexington (Des Moines, Iowa), listed on the National Register of Historic Places in Polk County, Iowa
- The Lexington (Liverpool), a residential tower in Liverpool, United Kingdom
- The Lexington, Islington, pub and music venue in Islington, London
- Lexington, the codename of a 2013 Intel Atom processor
- Lexington Stakes (Keeneland), a thoroughbred horse race held at Keeneland Race Course, Lexington, Kentucky
- Lexington Stakes (NYRA), a discontinued thoroughbred horse race last held at Belmont Park, New York in 2007

== See also ==
- Lexington Airport (disambiguation)
- Lexington Bridge (disambiguation)
- Lexington Avenue (disambiguation)
- Lexington station (disambiguation), train stations of the name
- Lexington Street (disambiguation)
