= Lexington (cigarette) =

Luxembourgish brand of cigarettes

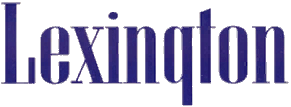
- Product type: Cigarette
- Current owner: British American Tobacco
- Produced by: Landewyck Tobacco
- Country: Luxembourg
- Introduced: 1950; 76 years ago
- Markets: See Markets
- Tagline: "For after action satisfaction, smoke Lexington.", "Lexington, that's the one."

Lexington is a Luxembourgish brand of cigarettes, currently owned and manufactured by Landewyck Tobacco. In South Africa, it is sold by BAT South Africa, a subsidiary of British American Tobacco.

== History ==
Lexington was launched in 1950 and became one of the most popular brands of the 1950s, with one billion cigarettes being sold every year since 1955. The cigarettes became a popular brand in the Netherlands and South Africa, but failed on the German market.

Various advertising jingles were created from the 1960s until the 1980s for South African radio, as well as advertising posters in Dutch and South African English and Afrikaans. A hand-drawn dog known as Lexi was also created in the 1960s to act as an advertiser for the cigarette brand.

Some of the most popular slogans used to promote the brand were "For after action satisfaction, smoke Lexington" and "Lexington, that's the one".

== Controversy ==
=== The Lexington-affaire ===
In March 1962, the Dutch Consumentenbond released an article in their own newspaper, the Consumentengids, comparing the 14 most popular cigarette brands in the Netherlands at the time based on their tar and nicotine levels. The test was done on a special smoking machine that mimics a person who smokes. The test concluded that there was little difference in the amount of nicotine in the cigarettes. The brands Three Castles, Peter Stuyvesant, Chief Whip, and Alaska had the smallest amount of nicotine in their smoke. The highest amount of nicotine was measured in the Lexington cigarette smoke with 0.88 mg. The differences in tar were much more prominent, however. The Roxy cigarette had the lowest amount of tar with 30.5 mg. The brands Hunter and Lexington had twice the amount of tar in their smoke with 75.0 and 63.9 mg respectively.

At the time there was much concern about possible health hazards of smoking. Since the 1950s, research had been performed about the health risks of smoking and in March 1962, 5 days after the publication of the Consumentengids article, a report was released by the Royal College of Physicians titled Smoking and health, linking smoking to various diseases such as lung cancer and heart attacks. The Dutch press paid a lot of attention to that report, as well as that of the Consumentenbond. Due to all the exposure from the newspapers, the article reached a lot more people than the 35,000 subscribers to Consumentengids.

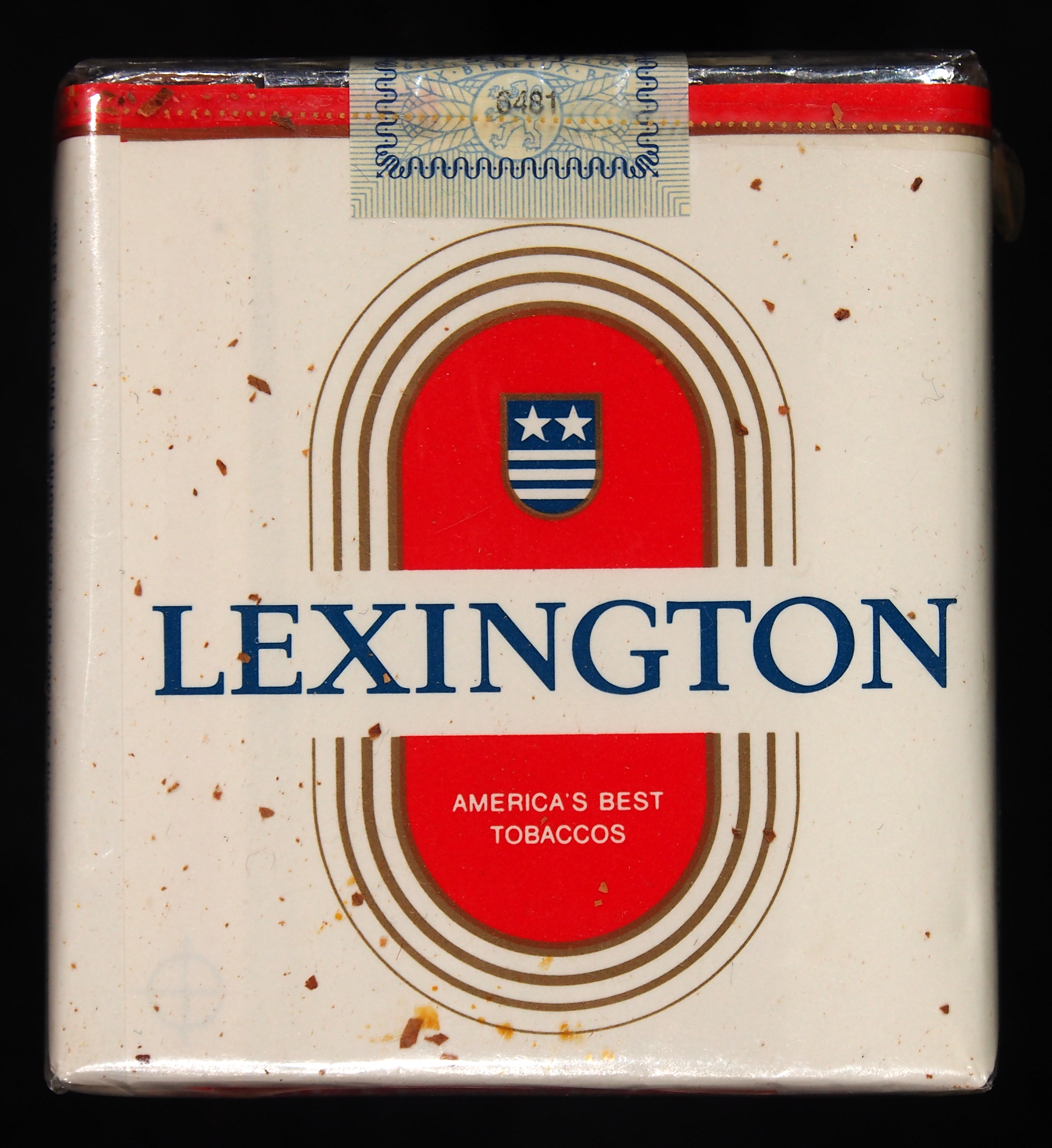
Dutch pack of Lexington cigarettes

The reaction was massive. Many people switched over to the brands that passed the test such as Roxy, others started smoking cigars as a safer alternative, and some reduced their smoking habit or even quit smoking altogether. The Koninklijke Theodorus Niemeyer BV company used the publication as publicity to advertise their Roxy brand as "low tar" and "low nicotine" with the slogan "Roxy – Nu beter dan ooit!".

Most tobacco companies at the time (such as British American Tobacco) refused to acknowledge the Consumentengids report, saying it was not factually based, and tried to focus as little attention on their brands as possible. However Abraham Jan Blok, the importer of the Lexington brand to the Netherlands, was furious. Lexington was the market leader at the time, with nearly 25% of all cigarettes sold in the Netherlands being Lexington cigarettes. Blok challenged the Consumentenbod, claiming that their test results were inaccurate, and performing his own tests in London, New York City and Zürich with different results, one showing that the amount of tar was as low as 12.1 mg, compared to the 63.9 mg in the Consumentenbond report. With these results, Blok started a new advertising campaign to "cleanse" Lexington from the dirty image it had acquired. He paid every major Dutch newspaper at the time (117 in total) at a cost of 250,000 guilders to publish a large advertisement claiming that the amount of tar in Lexington cigarettes was much lower than what was reported in the Consumentengids report. At the same time he launched a major publicity offensive with leaflets and increased advertising including a cinema advertisement featuring cool stuntmen and rough cowboys.

Bartholomeus Buitendijk, one of the two original founders of the Consumentenbond, reacted on the radio about Blok's accusations concerning the test. Abraham Blok said that it was not an exaggeration, due to the fact that the manufacturer of Lexington had lost millions after the publication of the article. On 25 May 1962, the Consumentenbond received a summons in which Blok sued them. The primary demand was that the Consumentenbond would have to release an extra edition of the Consumentengids within one week containing a correction to the test report.

The court hearing began on 6 June 1962. J.A. Stoop, Blok's lawyer, attacked the "irresponsible" and "hasty" publication of the results of the "faulty" test by the Consumentenbond and compared it to the results from the other three tests done in London, New York and Zürich. From these results it was shown that a different length of cigarette, puff duration, puff frequency and puff volume were used and that the results for tar and nicotine were different for that reason. The lawyer for the defence, J.A. Nagtegaal, tried to justify the test in every way possible by calling various experts to his defence; Bertram who led the research, a statistician (who abruptly debunked his own research) and a doctor. After several days of testimony, the final judgement on 22 June 1962, concluded that there was no standard way of testing, and the Consumentenbond should have realised this before publishing the article. The judge (an avid subscriber to the Consumentengids who had not smoked for years and hoped that he would not lose his subscription) said that Lexington was right but did not agree with all the demands made by Blok. The Consumentenbond was forbidden to repeat the publication and had to pay Blok's court costs of 395 guilders, but was not required to publish a retraction as Blok had demanded.

In July 1962, the members of the Consumentenbond and Blok reached a compromise; Blok dropped all the demands for financial compensation, and the Consumentenbond published a correction in Consumentengids, admitting their wrongdoing.

The whole Lextington-affaire was publicised widely in the press. Before the judge reached his final judgement, there was a lot of criticism of the way the Consumentenbond handled the situation. Especially Elsevier and several trade magazines lashed out at the company, calling the test "shameful and harmful" and the Consumentenbond "meddlesome" and "left-leaning".

The aftermath of the affair had large and surprising consequences. The Consumentenbond was accused of being inaccurate and "dilettantist", but had also gained valuable publicity and were praised as a small company who had bravely fought against the producer of a big and popular brand of cigarettes. The company gained 25,000 new members, reaching 250,000 in 1969. Even though Blok had won the court case, the constant association between the Consumentenbond test and his brand, as well as the ever-increasing fear of smoking and health hazards in the Dutch market, caused Lexington's market share to crumble within two years from nearly 25% to 7%, declining to a second-tier brand within a few years.

Lexington is still manufactured in the Netherlands, while Abraham Blok moved to Switzerland. The dog Lexi was terminated as no longer fitting into Lexington's market strategy.

== Sponsorships ==
=== Formula 1 ===
In the 1975 Formula One season and 1976 Formula One season, Lexington sponsored a private-entry Tyrrell Racing team to compete with Ian Scheckter at the 1975 and 1976 South African Grand Prix. The car used and driven was the Tyrrell 007.

== Markets ==
Lexington is or was sold in the following countries: Luxembourg, Netherlands, Germany, Greece, Zambia and South Africa.

== See also ==
- Tobacco smoking
