= Piety Corner Historic District =

Historic district in Massachusetts, United States

- U.S. National Register of Historic Places
- U.S. Historic district
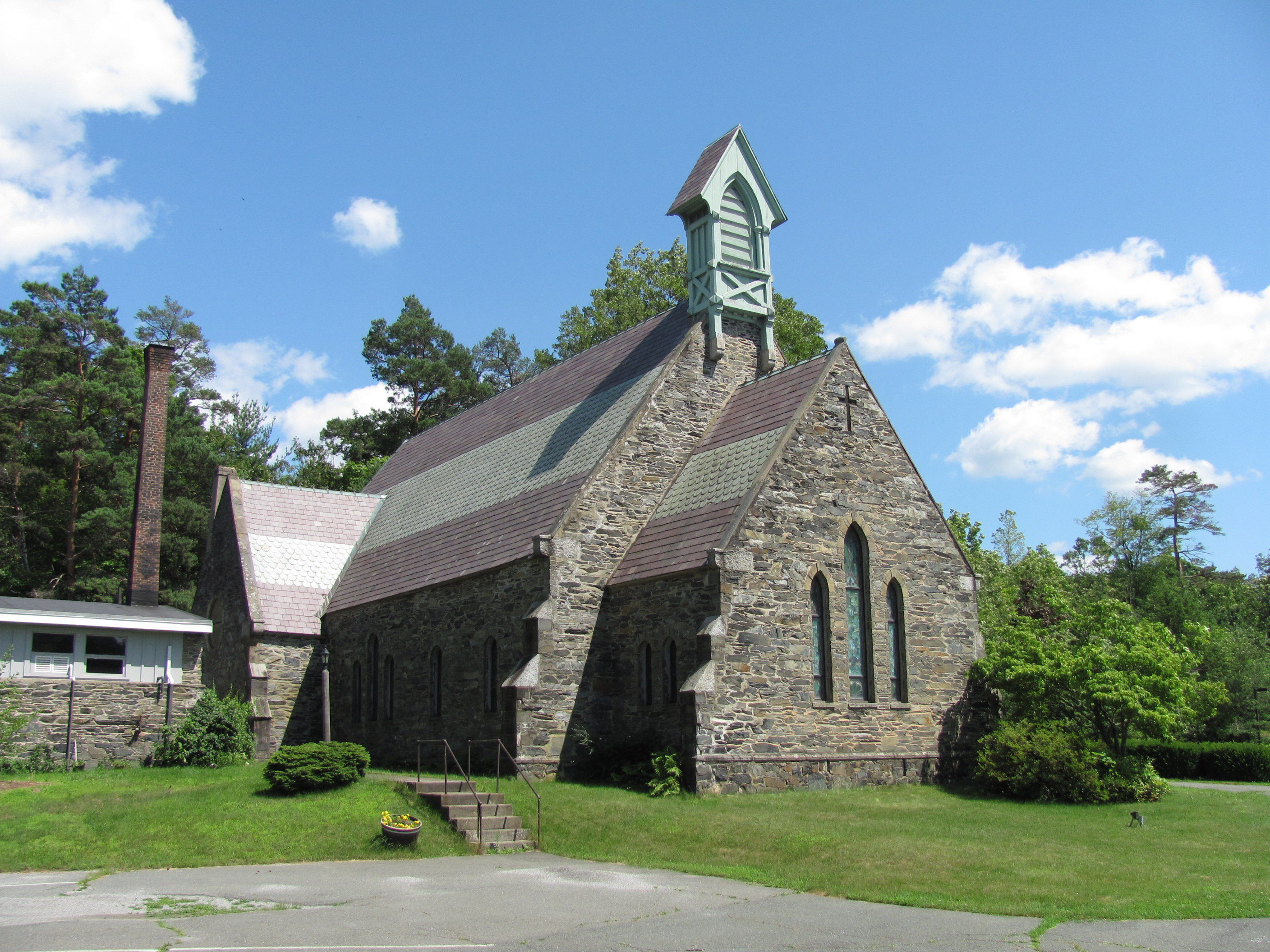
- The former Covenant Congregational Church; part of Chapel Hill - Chauncy Hall School as of 2011

- Location within Massachusetts Location within the United States
- Location: Roughly Bacon and Lexington Sts., Waltham, Massachusetts
- Coordinates: 42°23′20″N 71°14′19″W
- Area: 65.6 acres (26.5 ha)
- Architectural style: Federal
- MPS: Waltham MRA
- NRHP reference No.: 89001499
- Added to NRHP: March 09, 1990

The Piety Corner Historic District encompasses one of the oldest settled areas of Waltham, Massachusetts. It is centered on a major road intersection, the junction of Totten Pond Road with Lexington and Bacon Streets, and includes the city's largest single concentration of well-preserved 19th and early 20th-century houses. It extends south from Totten Pond Road along Bacon Street as far as Greenwood Lane, and along Lexington Street to Beaver Street. The district was listed on the National Register of Historic Places in 1990.

== History ==
The Piety Corner area was first settled by English colonists in the late 17th century, when it became known as "Hosier's Corner" after an early resident. It acquired its present name because it was home to a number of ministers. None of the houses from the early settlement period survive in the district, although Waltham's oldest house, the c. 1721 Hagar-Smith-Livermore-Sanderson House, is not far away. The district's oldest properties are the Federal style Sanderson-Bemis House (c. 1819-29, 380 Lexington Street) and the Jonas Clark House (c. 1825, 399 Lexington Street).

The focus of development in Waltham shifted south toward the Charles River in the 1820s with the establishment of the Boston Manufacturing Company, and the Piety Corner area saw relatively little development. In 1859, the Waltham Corporation of the New Jerusalem Church was founded for the many New-Church families in the area of Piety Corner. The following year in 1860, The Waltham New-Church School was founded to further support these local families. There was a surge in development when the Swedenborgian Church (which later became the Covenant Congregational Church) was built; its present English Medieval building was finished in 1879. By 1864, the school had grown too large for the space, so the Waltham New-Church school built two additional school buildings: Wilkins Hall and the Cottage. Both of these buildings are still in use today by Chapel Hill - Chauncy Hall School.

Shortly thereafter the ownership of the school was transferred to the New-Church Institute of Education. In 1912, the name of the school was changed to the Waltham School for Girls as the times showed a trend away from coeducation. The school continued to accept boys in the lower grades and since the boys did not take kindly to the school's name, the lower school became known as Chapel Hill in 1937. In 2010, The Covenant Congregational Church closed after serving the community for 150 years. In 2011, the Church was reconnected with the remainder of the campus that is now called Chapel Hill - Chauncy Hall School.

In the 1860s, a number of Second Empire mansard-roofed houses were built, as were two of Waltham's finest Carpenter Gothic houses, at 326 and 356 Bacon Street. One of the city's most unusual houses was built in 1875: originally built as an octagon house, 361 Bacon Street was later truncated to its present odd shape. By the late 19th century the area was transformed into a fashionable upper-class residential area, as evidenced by a number of fine Queen Anne and Colonial Revival houses. Particularly fine examples of the first style are found at 326 Lexington (1888) and 395 Lexington (1891).

In 1960, the Piety Corner area was broken up to some extent by the construction of Totten Pond Road, a major roadway leading west from the junction. As a result, a portion of the historic area, near the junction of Lexington and Lincoln Streets, is now separated from the main area, and was listed separately as the North Lexington Street Historic District.

== See also ==
- National Register of Historic Places listings in Waltham, Massachusetts
- Chapel Hill - Chauncy Hall School
