= John Sanderson House =

Historic house in Massachusetts, United States

- U.S. National Register of Historic Places
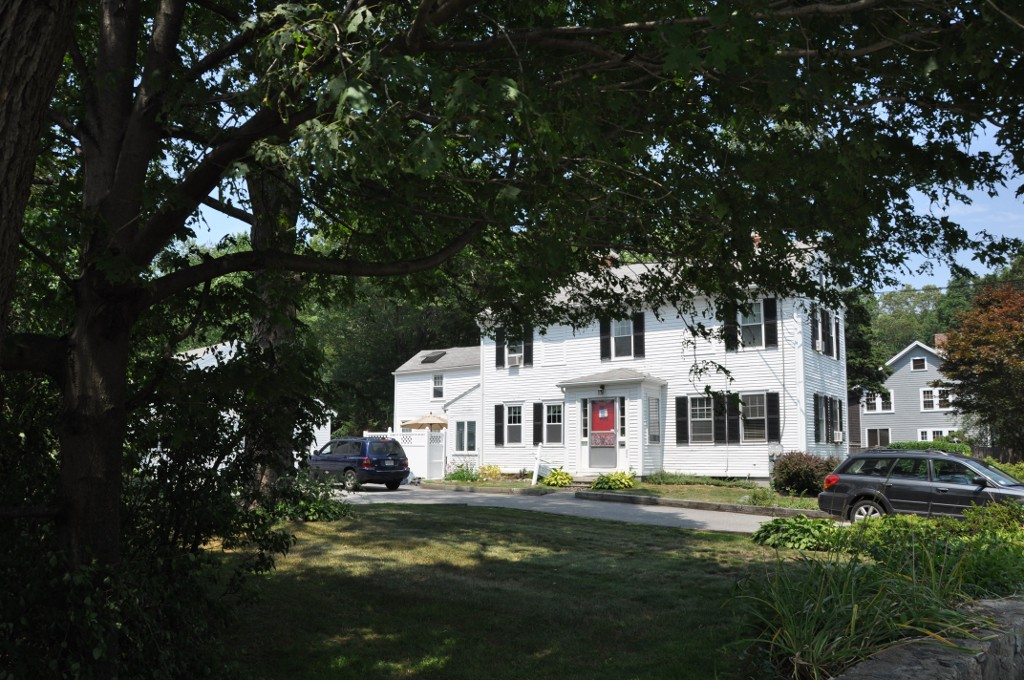

- Location within Massachusetts Location within the United States
- Location: 564 Lexington St., Waltham, Massachusetts
- Coordinates: 42°23′41″N 71°14′15″W
- Built: 1826
- Architectural style: Federal
- MPS: Waltham MRA
- NRHP reference No.: 89001563
- Added to NRHP: September 28, 1989

The John Sanderson House is a historic house at 564 Lexington Street in Waltham, Massachusetts. Built in 1826, this 2 1/2-story wood-frame house is one a few Federal style houses in the city, and the only one with a brick end wall. It has well-preserved period features, including rear-wall chimneys, simple moulded window surrounds, and a centered entry with half-length sidelight windows. It is one of a cluster of houses in the immediate area with connection to the Sanderson family, who were early settlers of the area.

The house was listed on the National Register of Historic Places in 1989, where it is listed at 562 Lexington Street.

== See also ==
- Nathan Sanderson I House
- Nathan Sanderson II House
- Sanderson-Clark Farmhouse
- National Register of Historic Places listings in Waltham, Massachusetts
