= Lexington Street =

Lexington Street may refer to:

- Lexington Street, Baltimore, Maryland, USA, a street in downtown Baltimore
- Lexington Street, Waltham, Massachusetts, USA, containing the North Lexington Street Historic District
- Lexington Street, Soho, London, England, UK, a famous street in the Soho district

== See also ==
- Lexington Avenue (disambiguation)
- Lexington (disambiguation)
