= Lexington metropolitan area =

The Lexington metropolitan area may refer to:

- The Lexington, Kentucky metropolitan area, United States
- The Lexington, Nebraska micropolitan area, United States

== See also ==
- Lexington (disambiguation)
