= Lexington Avenue (disambiguation) =

Lexington Avenue is an avenue on the East Side of Manhattan in New York City.

Lexington Avenue may also refer to:

- Lexington Avenue–63rd Street (63rd Street Lines), serving the F, <F>, N, Q, and R trains
- Lexington Avenue/59th Street (BMT Broadway Line), serving the N, R, and W trains
- Lexington Avenue-53rd Street (IND Queens Boulevard Line), serving the E and M trains
- IRT Lexington Avenue Line, the east side trunk line serving the 4, 5, 6, and <6> trains
- Lexington Avenue (Asheville, North Carolina)

== See also ==
- Lexington (disambiguation)
- Lexington Street (disambiguation)
