= Lexington Airport =

Lexington Airport may refer to:

- Lexington Airport (Oregon) in Lexington, Oregon, United States (FAA: 9S9)
- Lexington Municipal Airport in Lexington, Missouri, United States (FAA: 4K3)
- Lexington Airport, now Region of Waterloo International Airport

Airports in places named Lexington:

- Blue Grass Airport in Lexington, Kentucky, United States (FAA/IATA: LEX)
- C. A. Moore Airport in Lexington, Mississippi, United States (FAA: 19M)
- Davidson County Airport in Lexington, North Carolina, United States (FAA: EXX)
- Jim Kelly Field in Lexington, Nebraska, United States (FAA/IATA: LXN)
- McCaslin Airport in Lexington, Oklahoma, United States (FAA: O44)
- Hanscom Air Force Base partially in Lexington, Massachusetts, United States (FAA/IATA: BED)
