= Lexington Market station =

Lexington Market station may refer to:

- Lexington Market station (Baltimore Light Rail)
- Lexington Market station (Baltimore Metro Subway)

== See also ==
- Lexington Market
- Lexington station (disambiguation)
