= Roxy (cigarette) =

Dutch cigarette brand

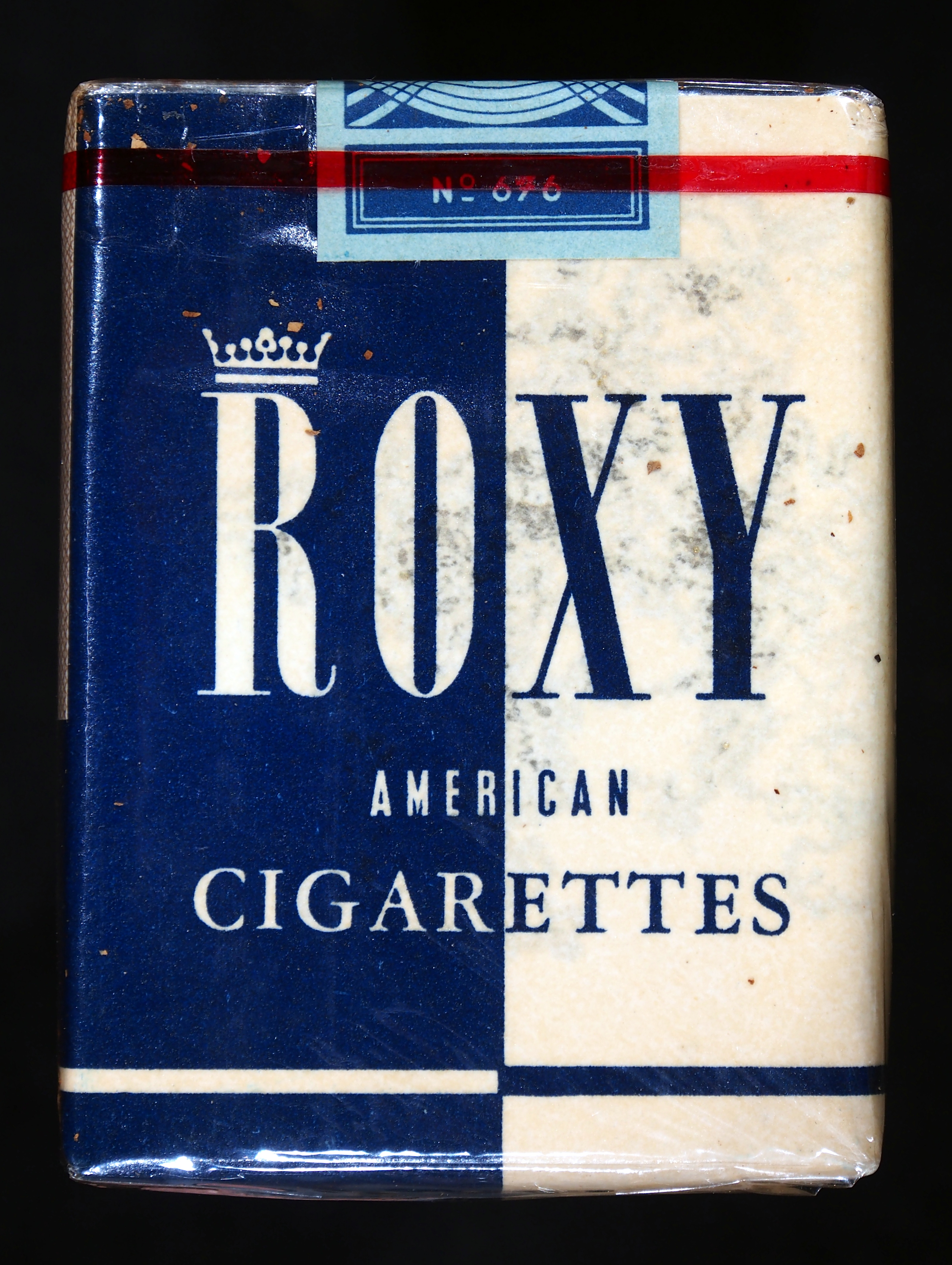
- An old Dutch pack of Roxy cigarettes.
- Product type: Cigarette
- Produced by: British American Tobacco
- Country: Netherlands
- Introduced: 19 March 1951; 75 years ago
- Discontinued: 2005
- Markets: See Markets
- Previous owners: Royal Theodorus Niemeyer Ltd.
- Tagline: "'n Roxy?....ja graag!" (Eng.:"Roxy, Yes Please".

Roxy was a Dutch cigarette brand that was manufactured by Royal Theodorus Niemeyer in Groningen, now owned by British American Tobacco.

== History ==
Roxy was created on 19 March 1951 by Theodorus Niemeijer. Their slogan was "'n Roxy?....ja graag!" ("a Roxy?....yes please!"). The brand was developed specifically as a cigarette which contained lower tar and nicotine. Although in the advertising for the cigarette references to health damage by smoking were avoided, scientific publications about the effects of smoking led to the creation of this cigarette. The consumer consciously wanted a safer cigarette. In 1962 the Consumentenbond did a comparative study of the tar and nicotine content in various cigarettes, in which Roxy had the lowest levels of tar and nicotine. As a result, the market share of Roxy cigarette grew compared to the other cigarette brands.

Dutch celebrities like John Kraaijkamp Sr. starred in various Star commercials during a time when tobacco advertising was still allowed.

In 1978, the football player Johan Cruyff starred in an advertising campaign called "Johan Cruyff: Rook Verstandig" (Johan Cruyff: Smoke Wisely), in which Cruyff promoted the Roxy Dual filter cigarette: "Maar ik vind: als je rookt, moet je wel verstandig roken" ("But I find: if you smoke, you have to smoke consciously". After complaints from mainly Konsumenten Kontakt (Consumer Contact), the ad was promptly banned by the Reclame Code Commissie (Advertising Code Committee).

The brand disappeared completely from the market in 2005, after a cigarette ad ban was put in place by the Dutch government in 2003.

== Packaging ==
The first packs had a mix of blue and black, but later a lighter shade of blue was used instead. The first cigarettes were packed in packs of 20 pieces, a box of 50 pieces, a flat tin box of 50 pieces and a round tin box of 50 pieces. There was a sliding box of 5 pieces as well, but that one was not available for sale, and it's speculated it was used for advertisements only.

== Markets ==
The brand was mainly sold in the Netherlands. It was exported to Germany and Italy.

== See also ==
- Tobacco smoking
- British American Tobacco
