= SS Lexington =

SS Lexington may refer to:

- SS Lexington (1835), an American steamship that caught fire and sank in January 1840 with the loss of all but 4 of the 143 on board; wreck reportedly contains gold and silver that went down with the ship
- SS Lexington (1890), an American passenger ship sunk in a collision in 1935
- SS Lexington (1919), the former Design 1099 ship SS Lake Fandango; renamed Lexington in 1933; renamed SS Norlantic in 1941 and sunk by U-69 in May 1942

== See also ==
- Lexington (disambiguation)
