= Lexington station =

Lexington station may refer to:

- Lexington Depot, a former railway station in Lexington, Massachusetts
- Lexington station (North Carolina), an Amtrak station in Lexington, North Carolina
- Lexington station (Rochester), a former rapid transit station in Rochester, New York
- Lexington Avenue/51st Street (New York City Subway), a New York City Subway station in Manhattan; serving the 4, 5, 6, and <6>; E, F, <F>, M, and R trains
- Lexington Avenue/59th Street (New York City Subway), a New York City Subway station in Manhattan; serving the 4, 5, 6, and <6>; N, Q, R, and W trains
- Lexington Avenue–63rd Street (63rd Street lines), a New York City Subway station in Manhattan; serving the F and M train
- Lexington Parkway station, a light rail station in Saint Paul, Minnesota
- Lexington station (Kentucky), a former station in Lexington, Kentucky

== See also ==
- Lexington Market station (disambiguation)
