= Nathan Sanderson I House =

Historic house in Massachusetts, United States

- U.S. National Register of Historic Places
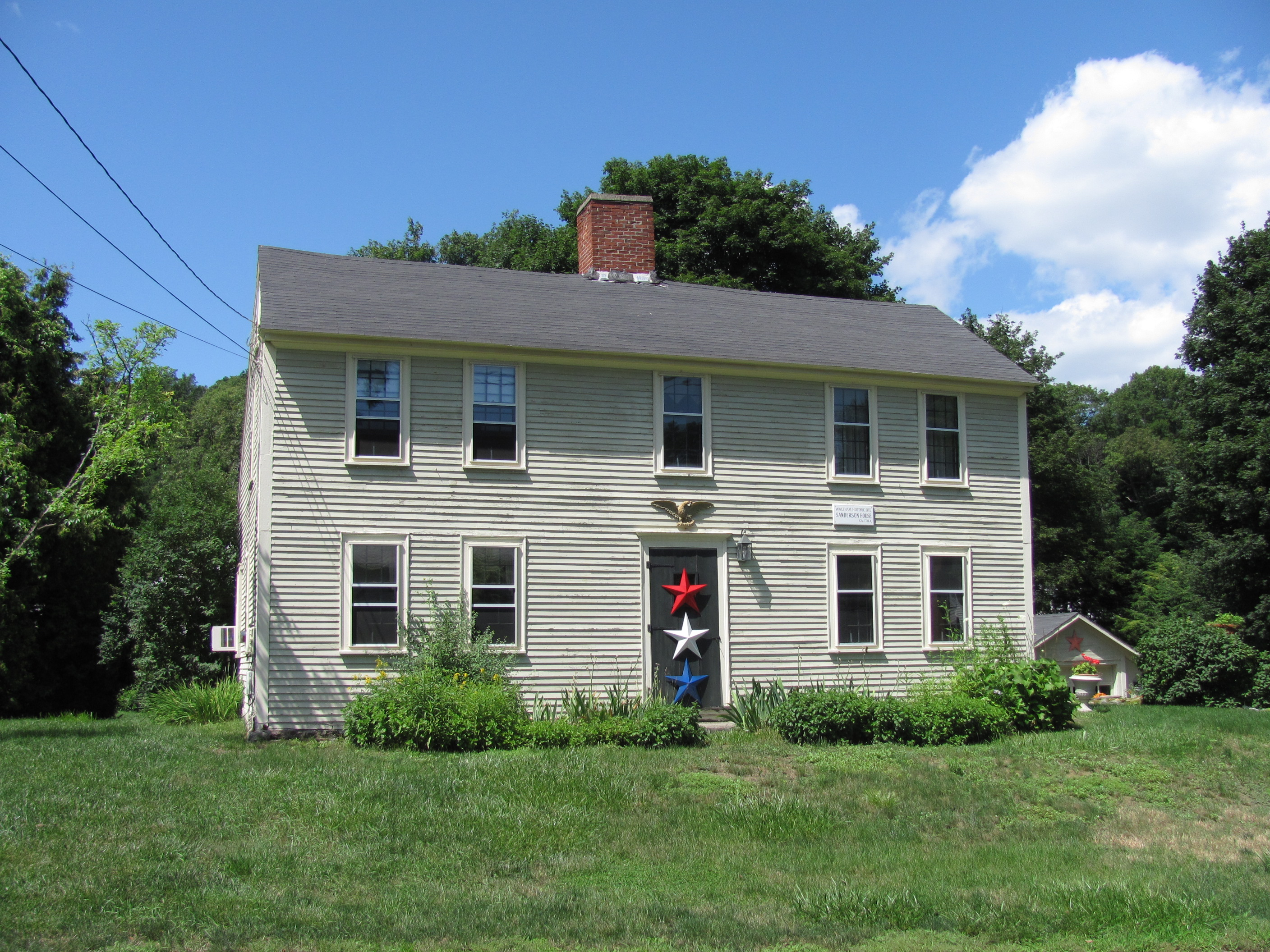
- Nathan Sanderson I House

- Location within Massachusetts Location within the United States
- Location: 107 Lincoln St., Waltham, Massachusetts
- Coordinates: 42°23′37″N 71°14′35″W
- Built: 1783
- Architectural style: Federal
- MPS: Waltham MRA
- NRHP reference No.: 89001556
- Added to NRHP: September 28, 1989

The Nathan Sanderson I House is a historic house at 107 Lincoln Street in Waltham, Massachusetts. The 2 1/2-story wood-frame house was built c. 1783, probably by Nathan Sanderson, over the foundation of an earlier (c. 1707) house built by an uncle. It was built in stages, with only two rooms on each floor at first; sometime before 1834 the roof was raised and a leanto added. The leanto was also raised to a full two stories in the 19th century, giving the house its present Federal profile. The house is one of several associated with the Sandersons, who were early settlers of the area.

The house was listed on the National Register of Historic Places in 1989.

== See also ==
- Nathan Sanderson II House
- Sanderson-Clark Farmhouse
- John Sanderson House
- National Register of Historic Places listings in Waltham, Massachusetts
