= North Lexington Street Historic District =

Historic district in Massachusetts, United States

- U.S. National Register of Historic Places
- U.S. Historic district
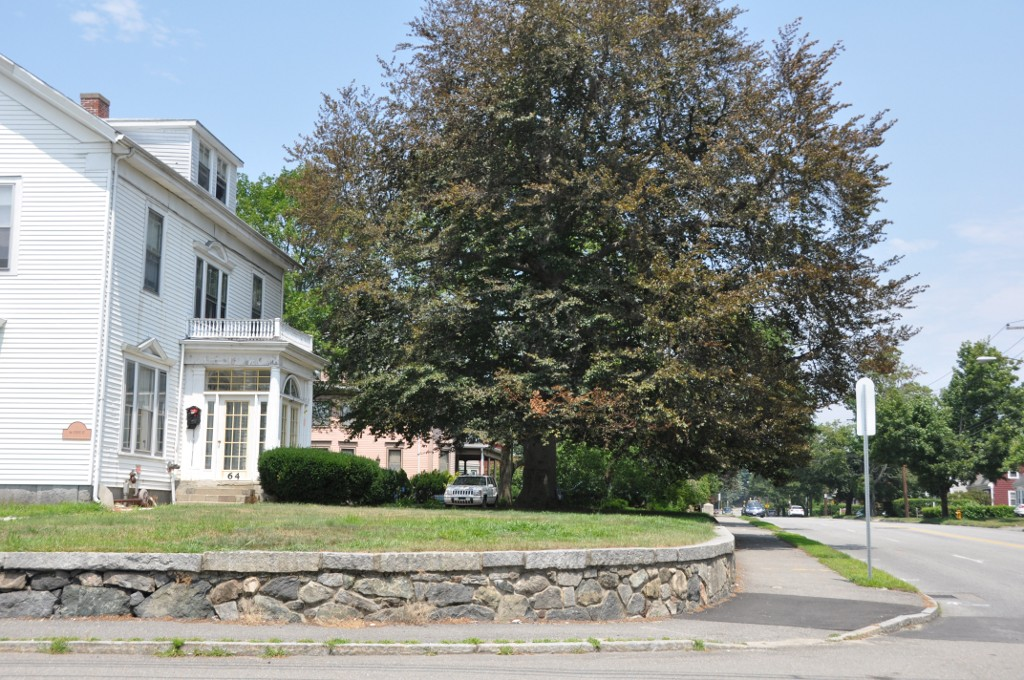

- Location within Massachusetts Location within the United States
- Location: 508–536 N. Lexington St., Waltham, Massachusetts
- Coordinates: 42°23′35″N 71°14′19″W
- Area: 3.17 acres (1.28 ha)
- Built: 1865
- Architectural style: Colonial Revival, Second Empire, Mansard
- MPS: Waltham MRA
- NRHP reference No.: 89001500
- Added to NRHP: September 28, 1989

The North Lexington Street Historic District is a residential historic district at 508–536 North Lexington Street in Waltham, Massachusetts. It consists of a cluster of four houses and their associated outbuildings, built around the turn of the 20th century, and unusual for its state of cohesion and preservation given the busy nature of Lexington Street. Three houses (508 and 520, and 536 Lexington Street) are Colonial Revival in styling, and 528 Lexington is an 1873 Second Empire house. The house at 508 Lexington was built in 1865 and extensively restyled in 1905; it retains some Italianate styling. Particularly rare in Waltham is the converted barn at 526 Lexington Street. This cluster of buildings was traditionally associated with the Piety Corner area, but is now separated from it by a significant number of more modern buildings.

The district was listed on the National Register of Historic Places in 1989.

== See also ==
- National Register of Historic Places listings in Waltham, Massachusetts
