= Lexington Bridge =

Lexington Bridge may refer to:

Bridges:

- Lexington Bridge (Mississippi River), a bridge over the Mississippi River
- Lexington Bridge (Lexington, Missouri), a former bridge over the Missouri River

Other:

- Lexington Bridge (band), a British-Dutch-American boyband
