= Lexington station (Kentucky) =

- Southern Railway Passenger Depot
- U.S. National Register of Historic Places
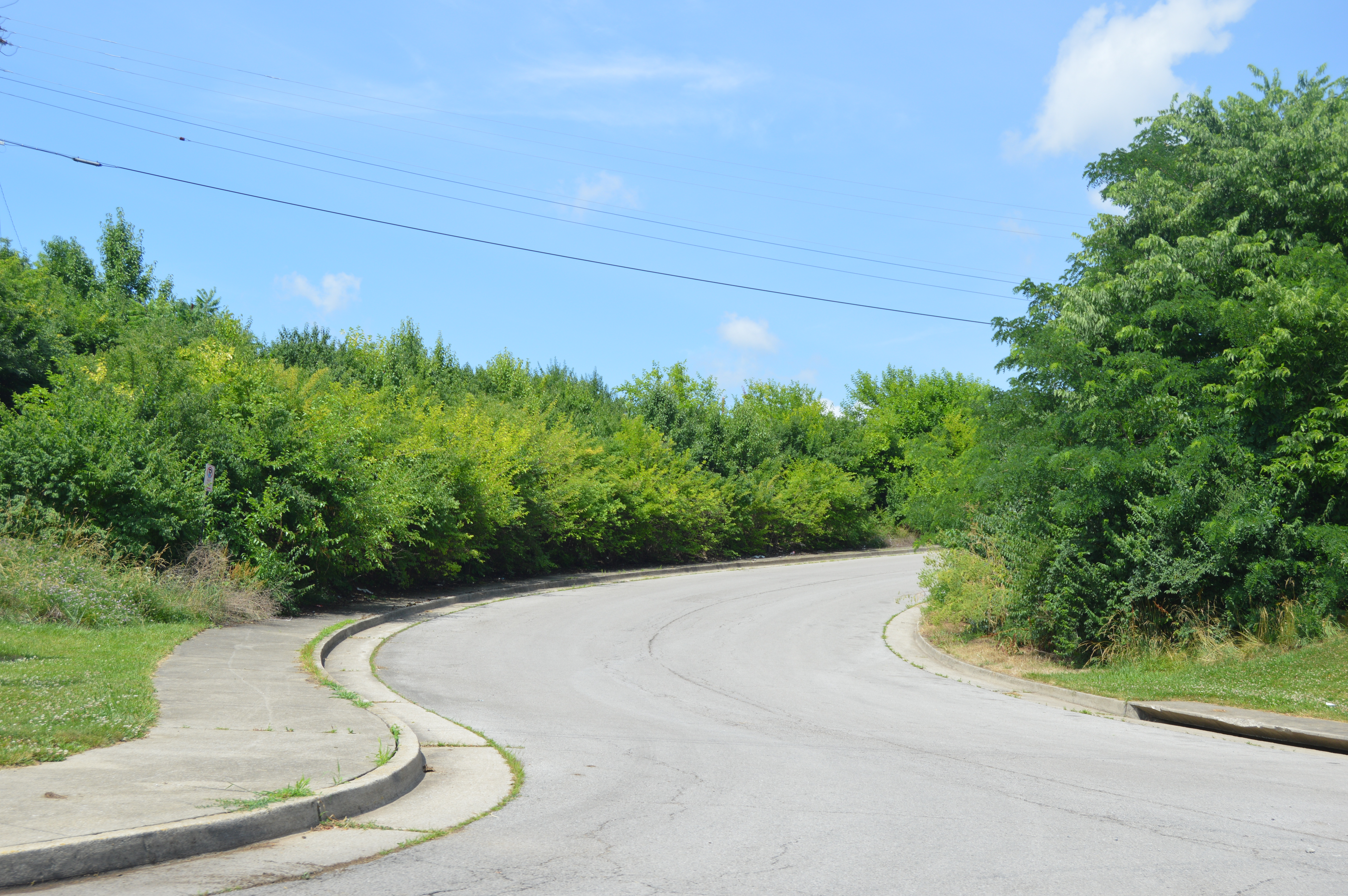
- Approximate station site in 2014
- Location: 701 S. Broadway; Lexington, Kentucky
- Coordinates: 38°02′34″N 84°30′37″W
- NRHP reference No.: 87001364
- Added to NRHP: August 13, 1987

Lexington station was a railway station in Lexington, Kentucky. The Southern Railway reached Lexington in 1877. The original station was gutted in a fire in 1906, and a new building was constructed adjacent to the old one. The railroads moved operations into the new depot on March 9, 1908. Passenger service ceased in 1971. It was listed on the National Register of Historic Places on August 13, 1987. Renovations on the building had stalled that summer due to nearby freeway construction. The building was largely destroyed in a fire on May 4, 1991, and it was demolished that October.

Preceding station	Southern Railway	Following station
Brannon toward New Orleans	New Orleans – Cincinnati	Greendale toward Cincinnati
Van Meter toward Lawrenceburg	Lexington – Lawrenceburg	Terminus
