= Lexington Avenue (Asheville, North Carolina) =

Prominent street in Savannah, Georgia

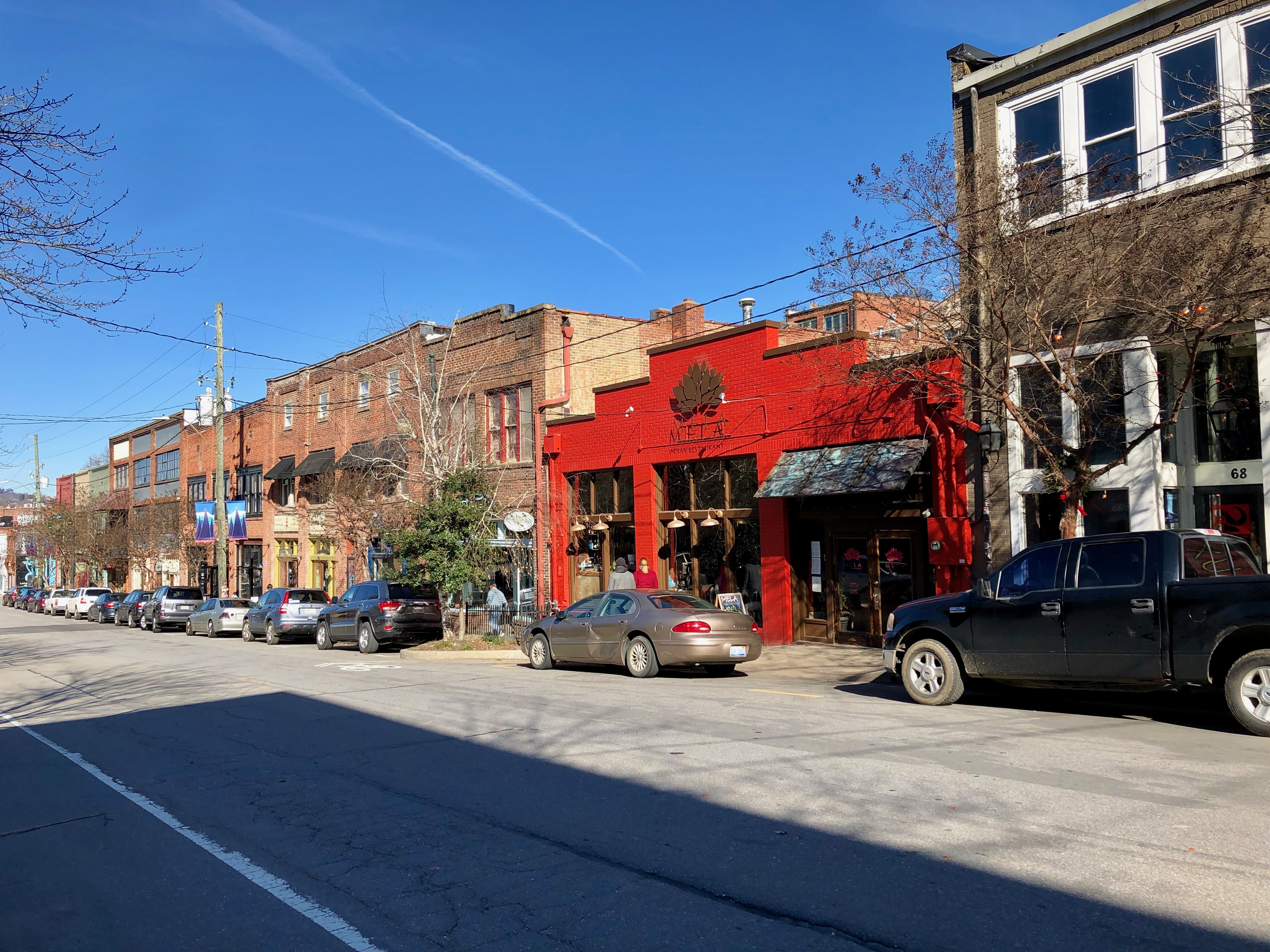
- Lexington Avenue in 2019
- Length: 0.76 mi (1.22 km)
- Location: Asheville, North Carolina, U.S.
- North end: Broadway Street
- South end: Southside Avenue

Lexington Avenue is a prominent street in Asheville, North Carolina, United States. Located between Rankin Avenue to the west and Broadway Street to the east, it runs for about 0.76 miles (1.22 km) from Broadway Street in the north to Southside Avenue in the south. Its addresses are split between "North Lexington Avenue" and "South Lexington Avenue", the transition occurring at Patton Avenue.

After falling into neglect for many years, the street was revitalized in the 1970s after city officials offered to build a mall on a large, eleven-block plot of land; Asheville citizens voted against the idea, however.

The Tyler Building, at 63 North Lexington Avenue (today occupied by DSSOLVR brewery), was built in the 1920s, during a construction boom that included the Grove Arcade, Asheville City Building and the Buncombe County Courthouse. When Dssolvr opened in 2019, it preserved the building's 16-foot-tall wooden front doors.

In 2003, the Asheville City Development Plan 2025 was implemented, encouraging higher densities, infill development and adaptive reuse. In addition, the City of Asheville Pedestrian Plan and the Urban Walking Trail (which includes stops on Lexington Avenue) were introduced, along with the Asheville Downtown Master Plan, in 2009, and a hybrid zoning code the following year.

Today, the street is known for being the home of over two hundred small businesses, including specialty shops, restaurants and brewpubs. Annually on the Sunday of Labor Day weekend, the Lexington Avenue Arts and Fun Festival (LAAFF) takes place, while the free Downtown After 5 Summer Music Series is hosted by the Asheville Downtown Association, bringing visitors to the street every third Friday in the summer months.

== Urban forest ==
Lexington Avenue's urban forest has been named "one of America's great places" by the American Planning Association. Friends of Lexington Avenue have been working to protect the forest against the planned construction of a new substation on the land by Duke Energy.
