= Lexington, Oregon =

- City
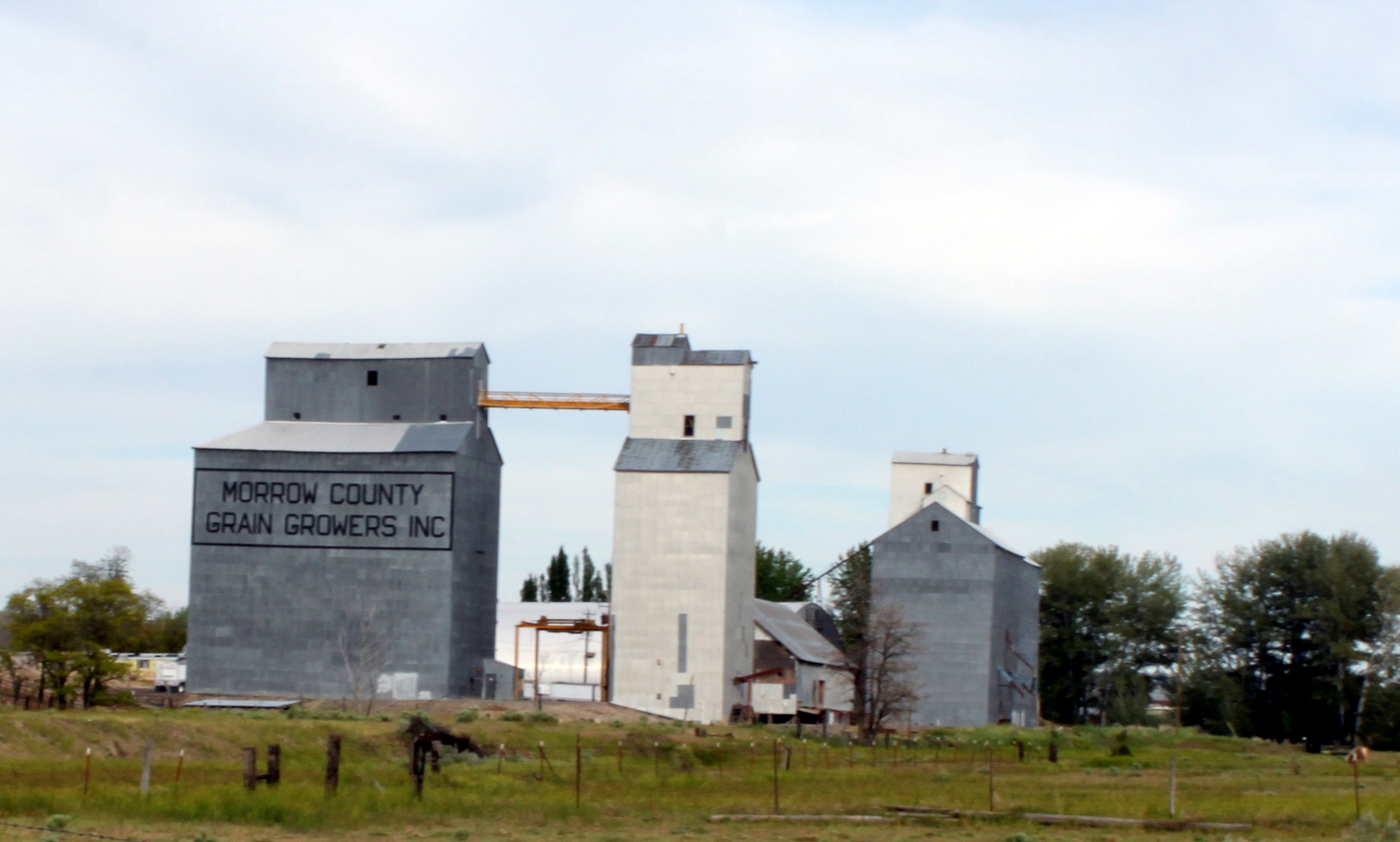
- Grain elevators in Lexington, May 2009

- Location in Morrow County and the state of Oregon
- Coordinates: 45°26′43″N 119°41′17″W
- Country: United States
- State: Oregon
- County: Morrow
- Incorporated: 1903

Government
  - Mayor: Sheila Miller

Area
  - Total: 0.44 sq mi (1.13 km^{2})
  - Land: 0.44 sq mi (1.13 km^{2})
  - Water: 0 sq mi (0.00 km^{2})
- Elevation: 1,450 ft (440 m)

Population (2020)
  - Total: 238
  - Density: 545.2/sq mi (210.49/km^{2})
- Time zone: UTC-8 (Pacific)
  - Summer (DST): UTC-7 (Pacific)
- ZIP Code: 97839
- Area code: 541
- FIPS code: 41-42200
- GNIS feature ID: 2412892
- Website: www.lexingtonoregon.com

Lexington is a city in Morrow County, Oregon, United States. The population was 238 at the 2020 census, unchanged from 2010. It is part of the Pendleton–Hermiston Micropolitan Statistical Area.

== History ==
Lexington was named by early settler William Penland for his hometown of Lexington, Kentucky. The Lexington post office was established in 1885.

In 1886, shortly after Morrow County was created, Lexington lost by 33 votes to Heppner in an election to determine the county seat. The town was incorporated in 1903, and had a population of 185 at the 1910 census.

Sheep ranching was important in the region during the days of early settlement by non-natives. It continues in the 21st century and has been joined by wheat farming and cattle ranching as significant uses of the land.

== Geography ==
Lexington is in central Morrow County, between the Columbia River 25 miles (40 km) to the north and the Blue Mountains the same distance to the southeast. The town is along Oregon Route 74, about 9 miles (14 km) northwest of Heppner, the Morrow county seat. Lexington is about 38 miles (61 km) southwest of Hermiston and 174 miles (280 km) east of Portland.

Willow Creek flows through Lexington, which is downstream of Heppner and upstream of Ione and Arlington. According to the U.S. Census Bureau, Lexington has a total area of 0.44 square miles (1.14 km^{2}), all land.

Route 74 forms part of the Blue Mountain Scenic Byway, a 130-mile (210 km) set of roads connecting Interstate 84 (I-84) along the Columbia River with the North Fork John Day River in the Blue Mountains. Part of the route follows the Willow Creek drainage through Lexington.

== Economy and education ==
As of 2002, Lexington's largest employers were the Morrow County Grain Growers (farms), the Columbia Basin Electric Co-op in Heppner, a metal fabrication company in Heppner, and a small company in Lexington that repaired farm equipment.

The headquarters of the Morrow County School District is in Lexington. The nearest public schools in this district are in Heppner.

== Demographics ==
Historical population
Census	Pop.	Note	%±
1870	23		—
1890	100		—
1900	175		75.0%
1910	185		5.7%
1920	264		42.7%
1930	180		−31.8%
1940	223		23.9%
1950	237		6.3%
1960	240		1.3%
1970	230		−4.2%
1980	307		33.5%
1990	286		−6.8%
2000	263		−8.0%
2010	238		−9.5%
2020	238		0.0%

=== 2010 census ===
As of the census of 2010, there were 238 people, 94 households, and 70 families residing in the town. The population density was 540.9 inhabitants per square mile (208.8/km^{2}). There were 101 housing units at an average density of 229.5 per square mile (88.6/km^{2}). The racial makeup of the town was 92.4% White, 0.4% Asian, 1.7% from other races, and 5.5% from two or more races. Hispanic or Latino of any race were 1.3% of the population.

There were 94 households, of which 28.7% had children under the age of 18 living with them, 60.6% were married couples living together, 9.6% had a female householder with no husband present, 4.3% had a male householder with no wife present, and 25.5% were non-families. 17% of all households were made up of individuals, and 8.6% had someone living alone who was 65 years of age or older. The average household size was 2.53 and the average family size was 2.86.

The median age in the town was 43 years. There were 24.4% of residents were under the age of 18; 6.7% were between the ages of 18 and 24; 19.4% were from 25 to 44; 31.9% were from 45 to 64; and 17.6% were 65 years of age or older. The gender makeup of the town was 55% male and 45% female.

=== 2000 census ===
As of the census of 2000, there were 263 people, 102 households, and 72 families residing in the town. The population density was 637.9 inhabitants per square mile (246.3/km^{2}). There were 111 housing units at an average density of 269.2 per square mile (103.9/km^{2}). The racial makeup of the town was 96.96% White, 1.14% Native American, 0.76% Asian, 0.38% from other races, and 0.76% from two or more races. Hispanic or Latino of any race were 0.38% of the population.

There were 102 households, out of which 29.4% had children under the age of 18 living with them, 64.7% were married couples living together, 4.9% had a female householder with no husband present, and 29.4% were non-families. 20.6% of all households were made up of individuals, and 12.7% had someone living alone who was 65 years of age or older. The average household size was 2.58 and the average family size was 3.03.

In the town, the population was spread out, with 24.3% under the age of 18, 6.8% from 18 to 24, 28.1% from 25 to 44, 24.7% from 45 to 64, and 16.0% who were 65 years of age or older. The median age was 42 years. For every 100 females, there were 107.1 males. For every 100 females age 18 and over, there were 103.1 males.

The median income for a household in the town was $43,125, and the median income for a family was $50,625. Males had a median income of $37,969 versus $24,688 for females. The per capita income for the town was $23,152. About 6.7% of families and 12.0% of the population were below the poverty line, including 20.6% of those under the age of 18 and 7.1% of those 65 or older.

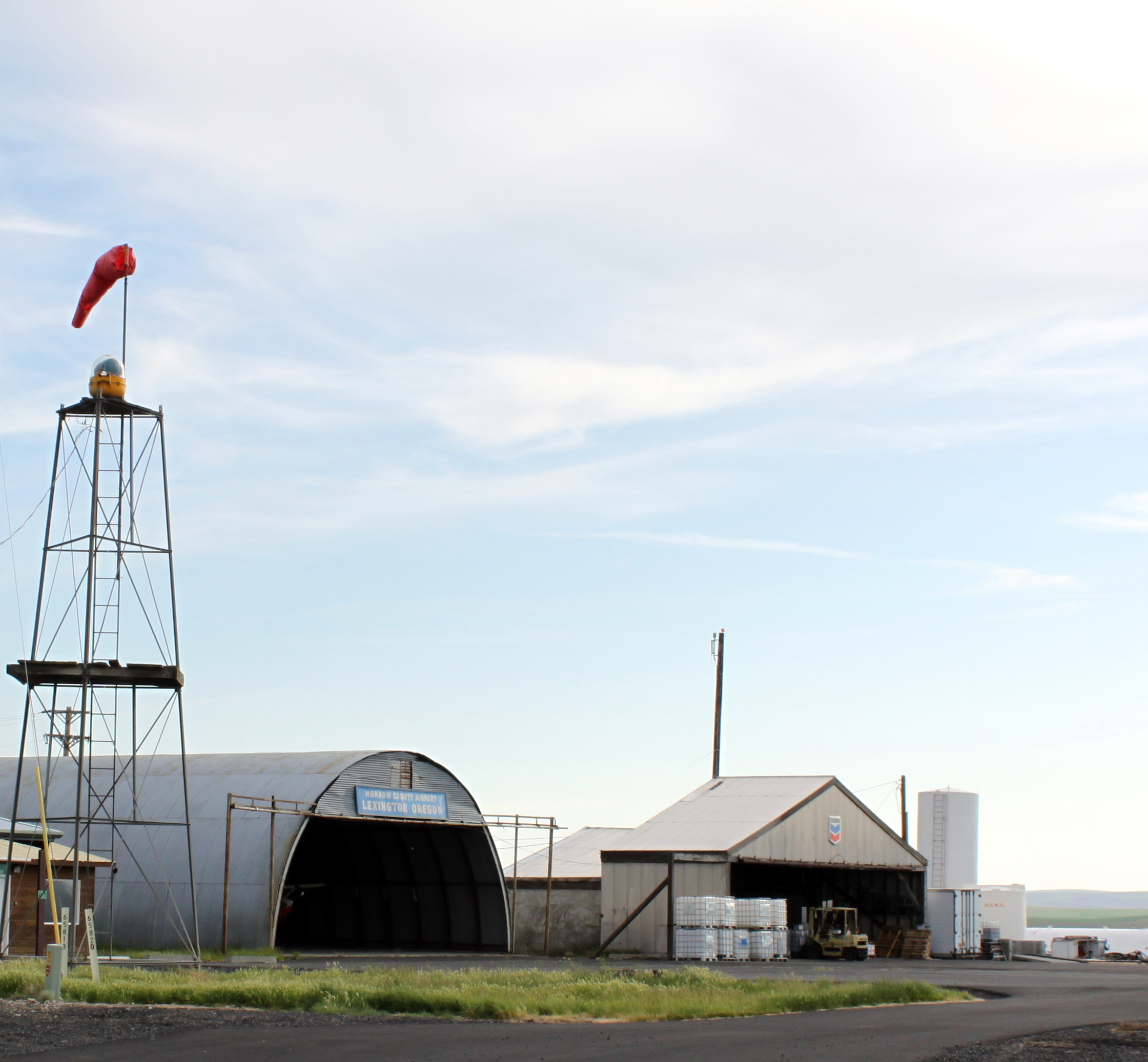
Lexington Airport, May 2009

== Transportation ==
Lexington Airport, which is open to the public, is about one mile north of the town. Operations involve an average of about 85 aircraft a week, mostly local. Seasonally, many flights are related to agriculture.

== See also ==
- List of cities and unincorporated communities in Oregon
