= Lexington Airport (Oregon) =

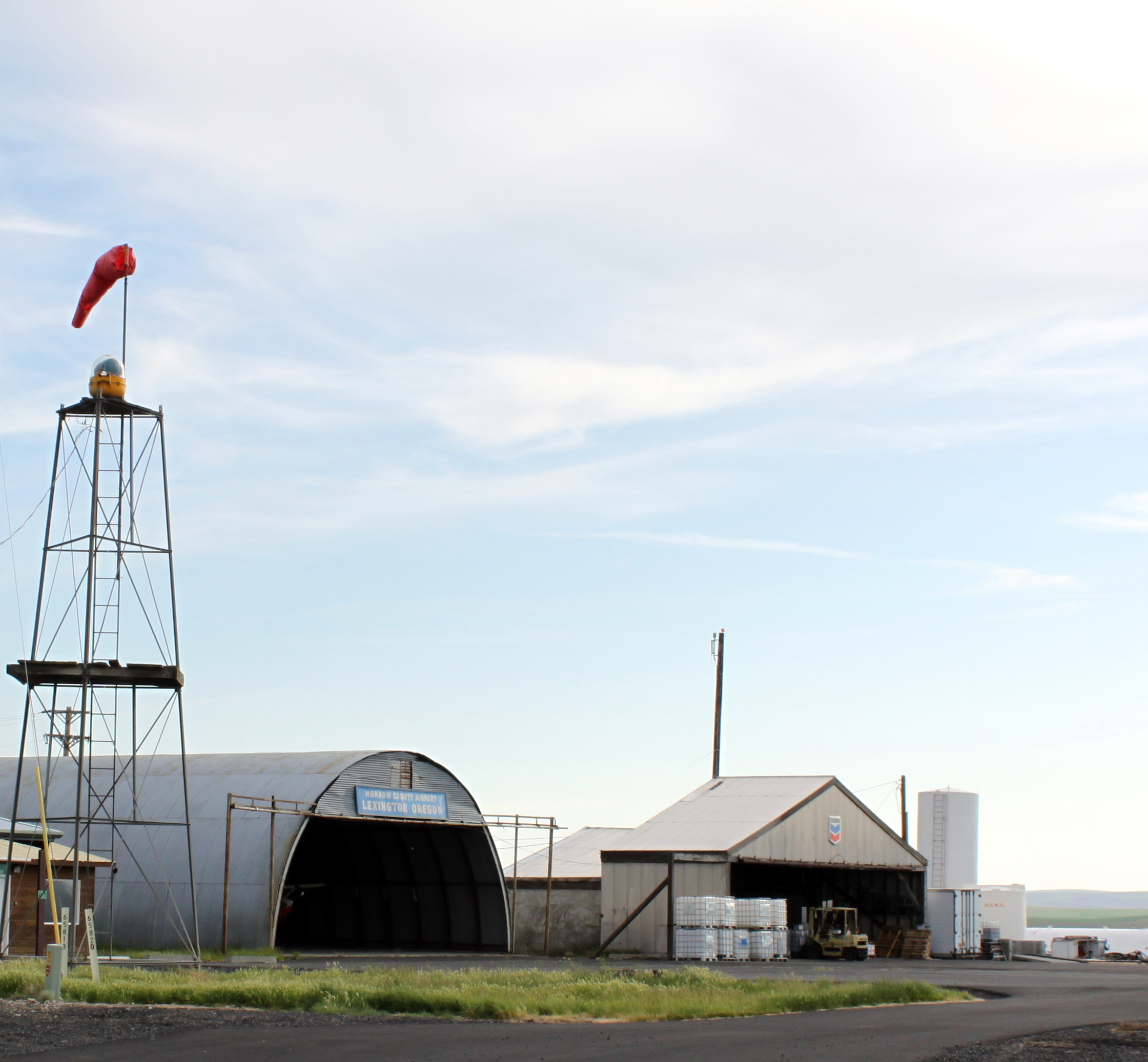
- Hangars and windsock at Lexington Airport
- IATA: none; ICAO: none; FAA LID: 9S9

Summary
- Airport type: Public
- Operator: Morrow County
- Location: Lexington, Oregon
- Elevation AMSL: 1,634 ft / 498 m
- Coordinates: 45°27′14.9210″N 119°41′24.96″W
- Interactive map of Lexington Airport

Runways
Direction	Length		Surface
Direction	ft	m	Surface
8/26	4,155	1,266	Asphalt

Lexington Airport (FAA LID: 9S9) is a public airport located one mile (1.6 km) north of Lexington in Morrow County, in the U.S. state of Oregon. In 2026, the airport received a Federal Aviation Administration grant of $160,000 to improve the runway lighting.

== See also ==
- Boardman Airport
