= Hagar–Smith–Livermore–Sanderson House =

Historic house in Massachusetts, United States

- U.S. National Register of Historic Places
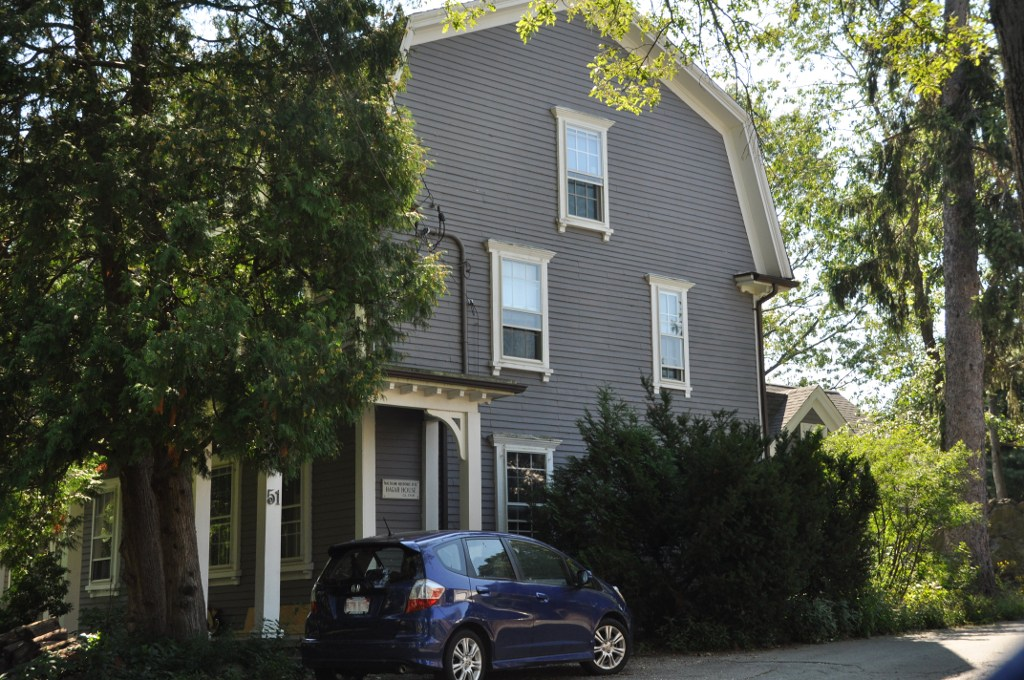

- Location within Massachusetts Location within the United States
- Location: 51 Sanders Ln., Waltham, Massachusetts
- Coordinates: 42°23′19″N 71°14′43″W
- Built: 1716
- Architectural style: Italianate
- MPS: Waltham MRA
- NRHP reference No.: 89001532
- Added to NRHP: September 28, 1989

The Hagar–Smith–Livermore–Sanderson House is a historic house at 51 Sanders Lane in Waltham, Massachusetts. The 2 1/2-story wood-frame house was built in several stages, and is considered to be the city's oldest surviving structure. Its oldest portion, now an ell attached to the main block, may have been built as early as 1716 (according to deed research), although architectural evidence suggests a date in the mid-18th century. This structure is attached to a larger main block that is now 2 1/2 stories with a slate gambrel roof. This section, however, also began as a 1 1/2-story structure, built in the 1780s. The house reached its current proportions in the mid-19th century, which is when it received its Italianate styling. The house has long been associated with a number of families prominent in the affairs of the town.

The house was listed on the National Register of Historic Places in 1989.

== See also ==
- National Register of Historic Places listings in Waltham, Massachusetts
