= Nathan Sanderson II House =

Historic house in Massachusetts, United States

- U.S. National Register of Historic Places
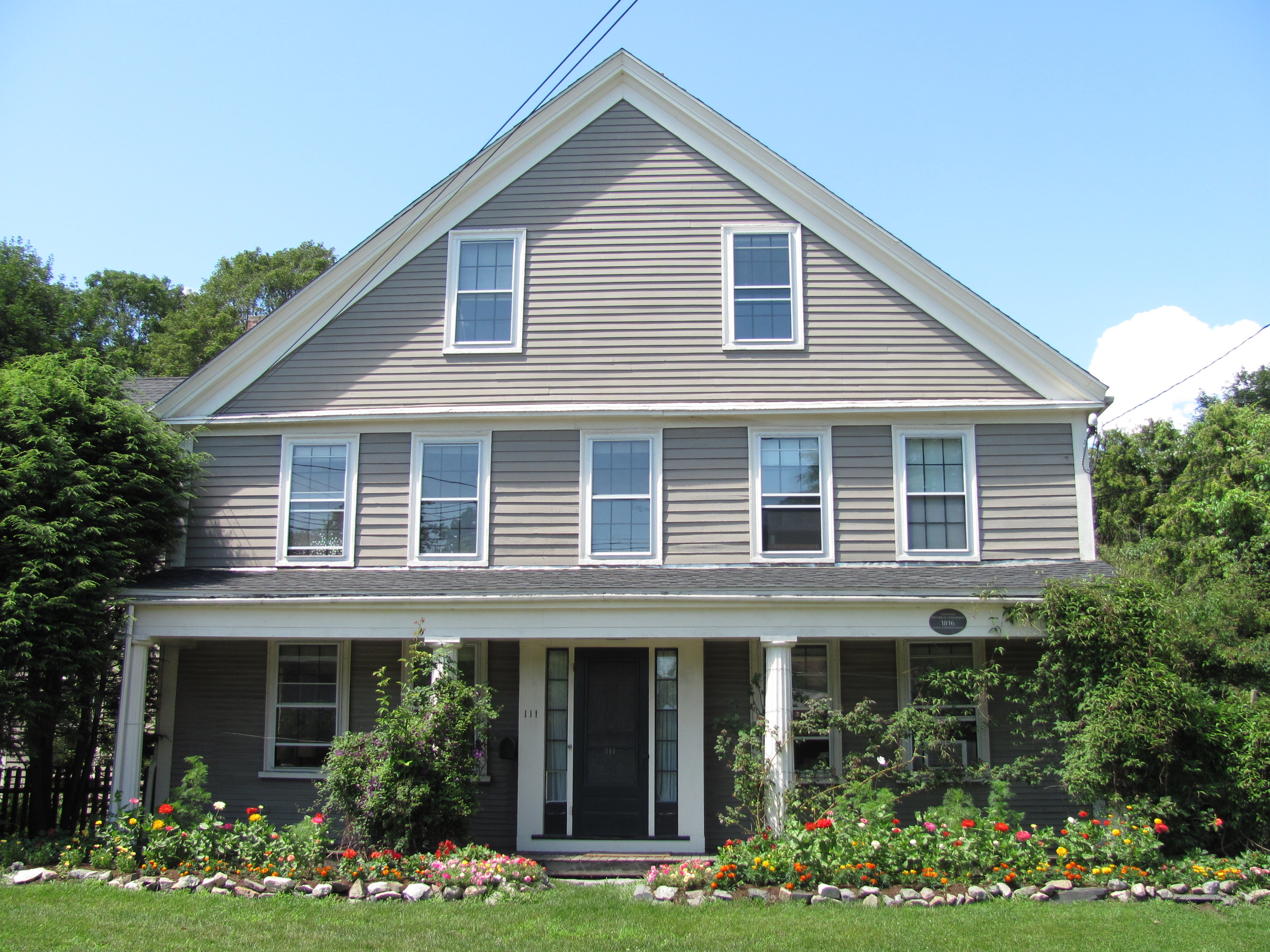
- Nathan Sanderson II House

- Location within Massachusetts Location within the United States
- Location: 111 Lincoln St., Waltham, Massachusetts
- Coordinates: 42°23′36″N 71°14′36″W
- Architectural style: Greek Revival
- MPS: Waltham MRA
- NRHP reference No.: 89001513
- Added to NRHP: September 28, 1989

The Nathan Sanderson II House is a historic house at 111 Lincoln Street in Waltham, Massachusetts. The oldest portion of this house, a 1 1/2-story timber frame section, is said to date to c. 1698. It was moved to its present location c. 1816 by Nathan Sanderson II, son of Nathan Sanderson I, whose house is next door. It was extensively altered at the time, giving it an unusual five-bay front-gable Greek Revival appearance. A single story porch with fluted Doric columns spans the main facade, and the slightly projecting central entry is flanked by sidelight windows. The house is one of several associated with the Sanderson family, who were early settlers of the area.

The house was listed on the National Register of Historic Places in 1989.

== See also ==
- National Register of Historic Places listings in Waltham, Massachusetts
