= Niemeyer (tobacco) =

Dutch tobacco company

Koninklijke Theodorus Niemeyer BV
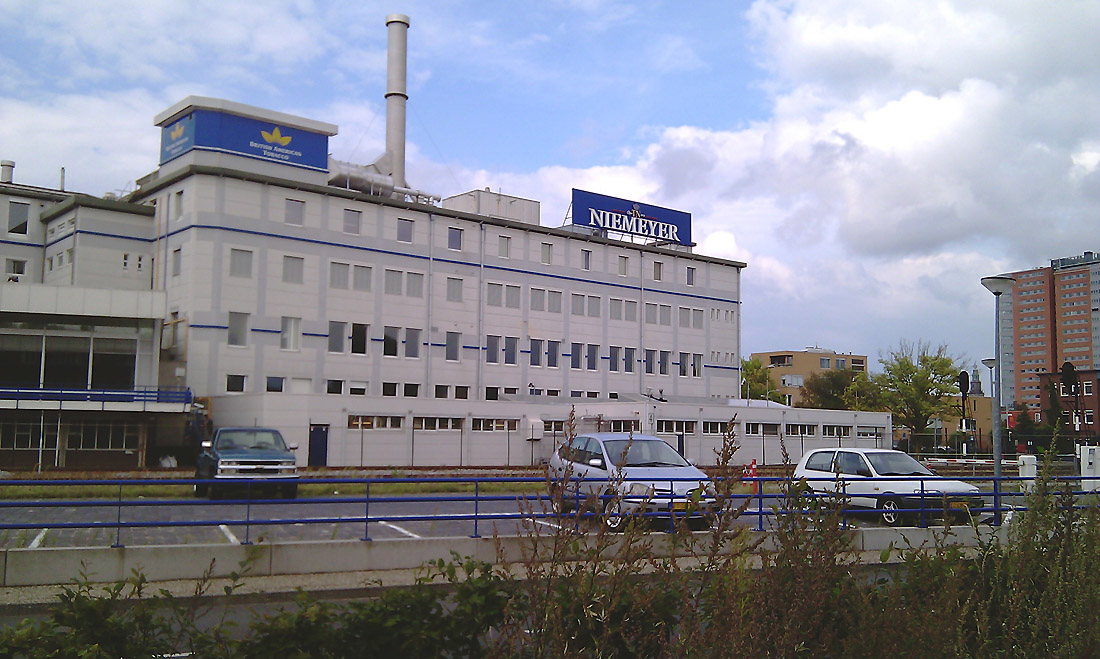
- Type: Subsidiary of British American Tobacco
- Industry: Tobacco
- Founded: 25 March 1819
- Headquarters: Groningen, Netherlands
- Key people: Simon Welford (chairman)
- Products: Cigarettes, shag, cigars
- Website: Official website

Koninklijke Theodorus Niemeyer BV (Royal Theodorus Niemeyer Ltd.) is a Dutch tobacco company. The company is currently part of the multinational British American Tobacco (BAT).

== History ==
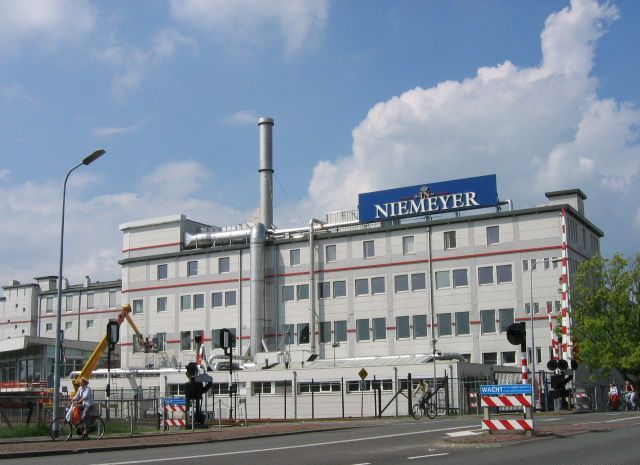
Factory in 2004

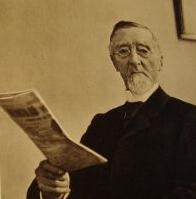
Theodorus Niemeyer (1822-1910)

Koninklijke Theodorus Niemeyer BV has been a family-run business for a long period with origins from the trade in products from the Dutch colonies. Meindert Niemeyer started the trading-business on 25 March 1819. The company sold products from the colonies, including tobacco (brandname Wapen van Rotterdam or Arms of Rotterdam). When son Theodorus Niemeyer took over the business they started producing and selling different brands, both under their own name and also supplying other companies (such as De Bijenkorf). The company then also started selling other goods from the colonies such as tea and coffee.

In the 20th century, the company grew by acquiring other tobacco-companies in the city of Groningen, and they also started looking to overseas markets. When the company celebrated its 150th birthday they received the title "Royal" (Koninklijk).

Until 1990 the company was completely independent, but in that year the company became part of Rothmans International. In 1999 the Rothmans merged with British American Tobacco. Koninklijke Theodorus Niemeyer BV is currently a subsidiary of BAT. However, the factory is still located in the city of Groningen.

=== Tobacco museum ===
Until 1 January 2011 the city housed the Niemeyer Tobacco-museum as part of the Noordelijk Scheepvaartmuseum (the Northern Shipping Museum). In 2010, it was decided to close the tobacco museum, as Niemeyer was withdrawing their funding for it seeing it unfit with BAT's policies for the future of the company. Without their funding it was not feasible to keep it open. The collection of the museum would be split up: articles that the museum had received as a gift or were on loan from people would be (as much as possible) returned. Other important pieces would become part of the (own) collection of the shipping-museum or go to other museums. Most of the then remaining items would be sold at an auction at Christie's in Amsterdam. The few articles that would remain are kept in the archives of the shipping-museum for safe-keeping.

== Products and brands ==
Koninklijke Theodorus Niemeyer BV produces (or produced in the past) a wide range of different brands. These include:

- Cigares: Schimmelpenninck, Corps Diplomatique, Westpoint, Javai, Don Pablo, Dunhill
- Pipe tobacco: Sail Troost, Neptune, Voortrekker, Clan, Art Enjoy, Dunhill, Royal Mixture, Indian Summer, Schippers, Captain Black, Stanwell, Erinmore, Edgeworth, Danske Club, Blanke Baai, Rode Ster, Flying Dutchman, Niemeyer
- Shag: Samson, Pall Mall Export, Javaanse Jongens, Schwarzer Krauser (Black Curly), Jakobs, Caballero Mild, Twin, Canuma, Gruno, Hoboken, 50 Miles, American Star, Dragon Special, Sterling, El Rey Mild, Goldstar, Gauloises, Bizon, Cutters Choice
