= Sanderson–Clark Farmhouse =

Historic house in Massachusetts, United States

- U.S. National Register of Historic Places
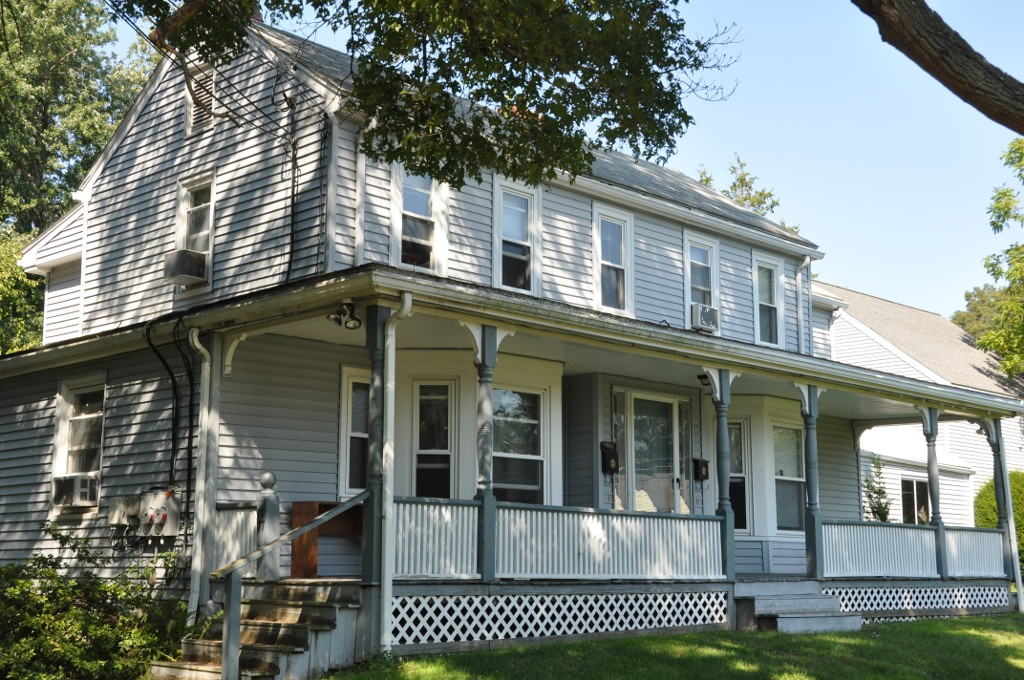

- Location within Massachusetts Location within the United States
- Location: 75 Lincoln Street, Waltham, Massachusetts
- Coordinates: 42°23′36″N 71°14′29″W
- Built: 1831
- Architectural style: Federal
- MPS: Waltham MRA
- NRHP reference No.: 89001557
- Added to NRHP: September 28, 1989

The Sanderson–Clark Farmhouse is a historic farmstead at 47 Lincoln Street (aka 26 Lincoln Terrace) in Waltham, Massachusetts. The property includes an 1831 Federal style house, along with farm-related outbuildings, including a barn and stable. The property was used as a working farm until the early 20th century. It is now surrounded by 20th-century infill development, although other Federal-era houses associated with the Sanderson family still stand nearby.

The house was listed on the National Register of Historic Places in 1989.

== See also ==
- National Register of Historic Places listings in Waltham, Massachusetts
