= Smith House =

Smith House may refer to:

== In the United States ==
=== Arkansas ===
- William H. Smith House, Atlanta
- Smith House (Bentonville, Arkansas)
- Rowland B. Smith House, Camden
- S.G. Smith House, Conway
- Joel Smith House, El Dorado
- Tom Smith House, Elkins
- Jessie B. Smith House, Fordyce
- A.J. Smith House, Griffithville
- Smith House (Searcy, Arkansas)
- Smith House (Wheatley, Arkansas)

=== Arizona ===
- Walter Lee Smith House, Phoenix, listed on the NRHP
- Jesse N. Smith House (Snowflake, Arizona), listed on the NRHP
- Professor George E. P. Smith House, Tucson, listed on the NRHP
- J. Homer Smith House, Yuma

=== California ===
- Williams Smith House, Napa, listed on the NRHP
- Ernest W. Smith House, Pasadena

=== Colorado ===
- William Smith House (Aurora, Colorado)
- Milo A. Smith House, Denver, listed on the NRHP
- Pierce T. Smith House, Denver, listed on the NRHP
- Smith House (Denver, Colorado), listed on the NRHP

=== Connecticut ===
- Frederick J. Smith House, Darian
- Samuel Smith House (East Lyme, Connecticut)
- Smith-Harris House (East Lyme, Connecticut)
- Jabez Smith House, Groton
- Shubel Smith House, Ledyard

=== Florida ===
- Dr. Chandler Holmes Smith House, Madison
- E. C. Smith House, Ocala

=== Georgia ===
- W. E. Smith House, Albany, listed on the NRHP
- Tullie Smith House, Atlanta
- Jim Smith House, Lyons
- Archibald Smith House, Roswell
- Dr. Robert L. and Sarah Alberta Smith House, Sharpsburg, listed on the NRHP
- Thomas W. Smith House, Tennille, listed on the NRHP
- Smith-Harris House (Vesta, Georgia), listed on the NRHP
- Robert Shand Smith House, Washington, listed on the NRHP

=== Idaho ===
- Nathan Smith House, Boise
- Henry Smith House (Challis, Idaho), listed on the NRHP
- C. Harvey Smith House, Twin Falls, listed on the NRHP

=== Illinois ===
- George W. Smith House (Oak Park, Illinois)
- Ephraim Smith House, Sugar Grove

=== Indiana ===
- Henry W. Smith House, Kokomo
- John W. Smith House, Rochester
- Everel S. Smith House, Westville

=== Iowa ===
- Smith Farmhouse (Lake City, Iowa)
- John Smith House (Le Claire, Iowa)
- Alvord I. Smith House, Davenport
- Henry H. Smith/J.H. Murphy House, Davenport
- James Smith House (Davenport, Iowa)
- William G. Smith House (Davenport, Iowa)
- Gen. Cass and Belle Smith House, Lake City
- Peter and Mary Smith House, Lake City
- Hiram C. Smith House, Winterset

=== Kansas ===
- Edwin Smith House (Wellington, Kansas)
- H.F. Smith House, Wellington

=== Kentucky ===
- George W. Smith House (Elizabethtown, Kentucky), Elizabethtown, listed on the NRHP
- Nelson and Clifton Rodes Smith House, Georgetown, listed on the NRHP
- Dr. William Addison Smith House, Georgetown, listed on the NRHP
- David H. Smith House, Hodgenville, listed on the NRHP
- Enoch Smith House, Mount Sterling
- F.A. Smith House, Munfordville, listed on the NRHP
- Thomas Smith House (New Castle, Kentucky), listed on the NRHP
- Maj. Hampden Smith House, Owensboro, listed on the NRHP
- Smith House (Paint Lick, Kentucky), listed on the NRHP
- William Alexander Smith House, Peewee Valley, listed on the NRHP
- Smith House (Shawhan, Kentucky), listed on the NRHP
- Smith House (Somerset, Kentucky), listed on the NRHP
- Beecher Smith House, Somerset, listed on the NRHP
- Levi J. Smith House, Springfield, listed on the NRHP

=== Louisiana ===
- Smith House (Franklin, Louisiana), listed on the NRHP
- Clifford Percival Smith House, Houma

=== Maine ===
- Zebulon Smith House, Bangor
- James Smith Homestead, Kennebunk
- George W. Smith Homestead, Mattawamkeag
- Parson Smith House, South Windham

=== Maryland ===
- William S. Smith House, Oriole
- Harry Smith House (Riverdale Park, Maryland)
- Gov. John Walter Smith House, Snow Hill

=== Massachusetts ===
- Thomas and Esther Smith House, Agawam
- Matthias Smith House, Barnstable
- John J. Smith House, Boston
- John Mace Smith House, Fall River
- Smith House (Ipswich, Massachusetts)
- James Smith House (Needham, Massachusetts)
- Curtis S. Smith House, Newton
- Marshall Smith House, Waltham
- Perez Smith House, Waltham
- Ellen M. Smith Three-Decker, Worcester

=== Michigan ===
- LeRoy Smith House, Algonac
- Smith-Dengler House, Calument Township
- Samuel L. Smith House, Detroit
- Melvyn Maxwell and Sara Stein Smith House, Pontiac
- Smith-Culhane House, Port Austin
- George and Mary Pine Smith House, Sheldon
- Smith House (Vassar, Michigan)

=== Minnesota ===
- W.W. Smith House, Sleepy Eye, listed on the NRHP
- H. Alden Smith House, Minneapolis
- Lena O. Smith House, Minneapolis

=== Mississippi ===
- Charles F. Smith House, Canton, listed on the NRHP
- A.L. Smith House, Monticello, listed on the NRHP

=== Missouri ===
- Smith House (Florissant, Missouri), listed on the NRHP
- James Smith House (Grandin, Missouri)
- Lawrence Smith House, Grandin
- William F. Smith House, Grandin

=== Montana ===
- T.W. Smith House, Joliet, listed on the NRHP
- Smith House (Kalispell, Montana), listed on the NRHP

=== Nebraska ===
- Woral C. Smith Lime Kiln and Limestone House, Fairbury
- George W. Smith House (Geneva, Nebraska), Geneva

=== Nevada ===
- Jay Dayton Smith House, Las Vegas

=== New Hampshire ===
- Gov. John Butler Smith House, Hillsborough
- Simeon P. Smith House, Portsmouth

=== New Jersey ===
- Nathaniel Smith House, Berkeley Heights
- David V. Smith House, Elmer
- John Smith House (Mahwah, New Jersey), listed on the NRHP
- Bridget Smith House, Mine Hill Township
- S.C. Smith House, Montclair, listed on the NRHP
- John Smith House (Morristown, New Jersey), listed on the NRHP
- Thomas Smith House (Mount Laurel, New Jersey), listed on the NRHP
- William Smith House (Salem, New Jersey), listed on the NRHP
- J. Harper Smith Mansion, Somerville Borough
- Albert Smith House (Waldwick, New Jersey), Waldwick

=== New York ===
- Frank W. Smith House, Amityville
- Augustus A. Smith House, Attica
- Adon Smith House, Hamilton
- Daniel Smith House (Huntington, New York)
- George J. Smith House, Kingston
- John Smith House (Kingston, New York)
- The Smith House (Montgomery, New York)
- Alfred E. Smith House
- Gerrit Smith Estate, Peterboro
- Almeron and Olive Smith House, Plandome
- Stephen and Charles Smith House, Roslyn Harbor
- Reuel E. Smith House, Skaneateles
- Obadiah Smith House, Smithtown
- Jacob Smith House, West Hills

=== North Carolina ===
- Whitford G. Smith House, Asheville
- William G. Smith House (Bullock, North Carolina)
- Francis Marion Smith House, Gibsonville
- Benjamin Smith House (New Bern, North Carolina)
- William E. Smith House, Selma
- William Rankin and Elizabeth Wharton Smith House, Whitsett
- Frank and Mary Smith House, Willow Spring
- Turner and Amelia Smith House, Willow Spring

=== Ohio ===
- Dr. Robert Smith House, Akron
- David Smith House, Clinton, listed on the NRHP
- William Smith House (Clinton, Ohio), listed on the NRHP
- Benjamin Smith House (Columbus, Ohio)
- Edwin Smith House (Dayton, Ohio)
- Charles William and Anna Smith House, Elyria, listed on the NRHP
- Samuel Smith House and Tannery, Greenfield
- William R. Smith House, Zanesville

=== Oregon ===
- Andrew Smith House, Dayton, listed on the NRHP
- Alvin T. Smith House, Forest Grove
- Herbert and Katherine Smith House, Grants Pass, listed on the NRHP
- Lame–Smith House, Halsey
- Bernard Pitzer Smith House, Myrtle Creek, listed on the NRHP
- John T. Smith House, Newberg, listed on the NRHP
- Alfred H. and Mary E. Smith House, Portland
- Blaine Smith House, Portland
- Milton W. Smith House, Portland
- Percy A. Smith House, near Portland
- Mary J.G. Smith House, Portland, listed on the NRHP
- Stanley C.E. Smith House, near Portland, listed on the NRHP
- Walter V. Smith House, Portland
- Henry Clay Smith House, Winston, listed on the NRHP

=== Pennsylvania ===
- William Smith House (Wrightstown, Pennsylvania)

=== Rhode Island ===
- Joseph Smith House, North Providence

=== South Carolina ===
- J. Warren Smith House, Liberty

=== South Dakota ===
- William P. Smith House (Stickney, South Dakota)

=== Tennessee ===
- Alexander Smith House (Brentwood, Tennessee)
- Christopher H. Smith House, Clarksville
- Warner Price Mumford Smith House, Mount Juliet
- Dr. Benjamin Franklin Smith House, Waco

=== Texas ===
- John Sterling Smith Jr. House, Chappell Hill, NRHP-listed in Washington County
- W. D. Smith House, McKinney, TX, NRHP-listed in Collin County
- Smith House (San Marcos, Texas), NRHP-listed in Hays County

=== Utah ===
- Warren B. Smith House, American Fork
- Ellen Smith House, Beaver
- Seth W. Smith House, Beaver, listed on the NRHP
- William P. Smith House (Beaver, Utah), listed on the NRHP
- Joseph M. and Celestia Smith House, Draper, listed on the NRHP
- Lauritz H. and Emma Smith House, Draper
- Lauritz Smith House, Draper
- Mary Smith House, Draper
- Thomas J. and Amanda N. Smith House, Kaysville, listed on the NRHP
- John Y. and Emerette C. Smith House, Lehi
- William McNeil Smith House, Logan, listed on the NRHP
- Jesse N. Smith House (Parowan, Utah)
- Hannah Maria Libby Smith House, Provo
- George Albert Smith House, Salt Lake City, listed on the NRHP
- Francis 'Frank' and Eunice Smith House, Vernal

=== Vermont ===
- Simeon Smith House (West Haven, Vermont)
- Simeon Smith Mansion, West Haven

=== Virginia ===
- Marshall-Rucker-Smith House, Charlottesville
- William Smith House (Hamilton, Virginia)

=== Washington ===
- Nat Smith House, Kelso, listed on the NRHP
- Edwin A. Smith House, Spokane, listed on the NRHP

=== West Virginia ===
- Michael Smith House, Cedarville
- Silas P. Smith Opera House, West Union
- Elven C. Smith House, Williamson

=== Wisconsin ===
- Francis West Smith House, Brodhead
- John Smith House (Clinton, Wisconsin)
- J.B. Smith House and Granary, Green Bay
- Richard C. Smith House, Jefferson
- T. C. Smith House, Lake Geneva, NRHP-listed in Walworth County
- Alexander Smith House (Madison, Wisconsin)
- Villa Terrace Decorative Arts Museum, Milwaukee, also known as the Lloyd R. Smith House
- Charles R. Smith House, Neenah
- Henry Spencer Smith House, Neenah
- Hiram Smith House, Neenah
- Daniel Smith House (Prescott, Wisconsin)
- Adam and Mary Smith House, Sun Prairie
- Camillia Smith House, Waukesha

== See also ==
- Smith Farm (disambiguation)
- Smith Building (disambiguation)
- Smith-Harris House (disambiguation)
- Alexander Smith House (disambiguation)
- Benjamin Smith House (disambiguation)
- Daniel Smith House (disambiguation)
- Edwin Smith House (disambiguation)
- George W. Smith House (disambiguation)
- James Smith House (disambiguation)
- Jesse N. Smith House (disambiguation)
- John Smith House (disambiguation)
- Henry Smith House (disambiguation)
- Samuel Smith House (disambiguation)
- Simeon Smith House (disambiguation)
- Thomas Smith House (disambiguation)
- William Smith House (disambiguation)
