= William Smith House =

William Smith House, and variations, may refer to:

- Captain William Smith House, in Lincoln, Massachusetts
- William H. Smith House, in Atlanta, Arkansas
- Williams Smith House, in the National Register of Historic Places listings in Napa County, California
- William Smith House (Aurora, Colorado)
- William G. Smith House (Davenport, Iowa)
- William Alexander Smith House, in the National Register of Historic Places listings in Oldham County, Kentucky
- William S. Smith House, in Oriole, Maryland
- William F. Smith House, in Grandin, Missouri
- William Smith House (Salem, New Jersey), in the National Register of Historic Places listings in Salem County, New Jersey
- William G. Smith House (Bullock, North Carolina)
- William E. Smith House, in Selma, North Carolina
- William Smith House (Clinton, Ohio), in the National Register of Historic Places listings in Summit County, Ohio
- William R. Smith House, in Zanesville, Ohio
- William Smith House (Wrightstown, Pennsylvania)
- William P. Smith House (Stickney, South Dakota)
- William P. Smith House (Beaver, Utah), on the National Register of Historic Places listings in Beaver County, Utah
- William McNeil Smith House, in Logan, Utah, in the National Register of Historic Places listings in Cache County, Utah
- William Smith House (Hamilton, Virginia)

== See also ==
- Smith House
