= Simeon Smith House =

Simeon Smith House may refer to:

- Simeon P. Smith House, Portsmouth, New Hampshire, listed on the U.S. National Register of Historic Places (NRHP)
- Simeon Smith House (West Haven, Vermont), listed on the NRHP in Rutland County, Vermont
- Simeon Smith Mansion, West Haven, Vermont, listed on the NRHP in Rutland County, Vermont

== See also ==
- Smith House
