= Henry Smith House =

Henry Smith House may refer to:

- Henry Smith House (Challis, Idaho), listed on the NRHP in Idaho
- Henry W. Smith House, Kokomo, IN, listed on the NRHP in Indiana
- Henry H. Smith/J.H. Murphy House, Davenport, IA, NRHP-listed
- Henry Clay Smith House, Winston, OR, listed on the NRHP in Oregon
- Henry Spencer Smith House, Neenah, WI, listed on the NRHP in Wisconsin

== See also ==
- Smith House
