= Daniel Smith House =

Daniel Smith House may refer to:

- Daniel Smith House (Huntington, New York), listed on the National Register of Historic Places in Suffolk County, New York
- Daniel Smith House (Prescott, Wisconsin), listed on the National Register of Historic Places in Pierce County, Wisconsin

== See also ==
- Smith House (disambiguation)
