= Edwin Smith House =

Edwin Smith House may refer to:

- Edwin Smith House (Wellington, Kansas), listed on the National Register of Historic Places in Sumner County, Kansas
- Edwin Smith House (Dayton, Ohio), listed on the NRHP in Ohio
- Edwin A. Smith House, Spokane, Washington, listed on the NRHP in Spokane County, Washington

== See also ==
- Smith House (disambiguation)
