= Samuel Smith House =

Samuel Smith House may refer to:

- Samuel Smith House (East Lyme, Connecticut), listed on the National Register of Historic Places (NRHP)
- Samuel L. Smith House, Detroit, Michigan, NRHP-listed
- Samuel Smith House and Tannery, Greenfield, Ohio, NRHP-listed

== See also ==
- Smith House
