= Jesse N. Smith House =

Jesse N. Smith House may refer to:

- Jesse N. Smith House (Snowflake, Arizona), listed on the National Register of Historic Places in Navajo County, Arizona
- Jesse N. Smith House (Parowan, Utah), historic building in Iron County, Utah

== See also ==
- Smith House (disambiguation)
