= Smith Building =

Smith Building may refer to:

- H. D. Smith Company Building, Plantsville, Connecticut, listed on the National Register of Historic Places in Hartford County, Connecticut
- H. W. Smith Building, Punta Gorda, Florida, listed on the NRHP in Florida
- D. G. Smith Building, Abilene, Kansas, listed on the NRHP in Kansas
- Mitchell Baker Smith Company Building, Lexington, Kentucky, listed on the NRHP in Kentucky
- Bradford Smith Building, New Bedford, Massachusetts, listed on the NRHP in Massachusetts
- W. J. and Ed Smith Building, West Plains, Missouri, listed on the NRHP in Missouri
- Alfred E. Smith Building, Albany, New York
- E. L. Smith Building, Hood River, Oregon, listed on the NRHP in Oregon
- R. S. Smith Motor Company Building, Sandy, Oregon, listed on the NRHP in Oregon
- Ashbel Smith Building, Galveston, Texas, listed on the NRHP in Texas
- Smith Tower, Seattle, Washington
- Smith Building (Parkersburg, West Virginia), listed on the NRHP in West Virginia
- W.H. Smith Hardware Company Building, Parkersburg, West Virginia, listed on the NRHP in West Virginia

== See also ==
- Smith House (disambiguation)
