= Gov. Smith Homestead =

Historic house in Connecticut, United States

- U.S. National Register of Historic Places
- U.S. Historic district – Contributing property
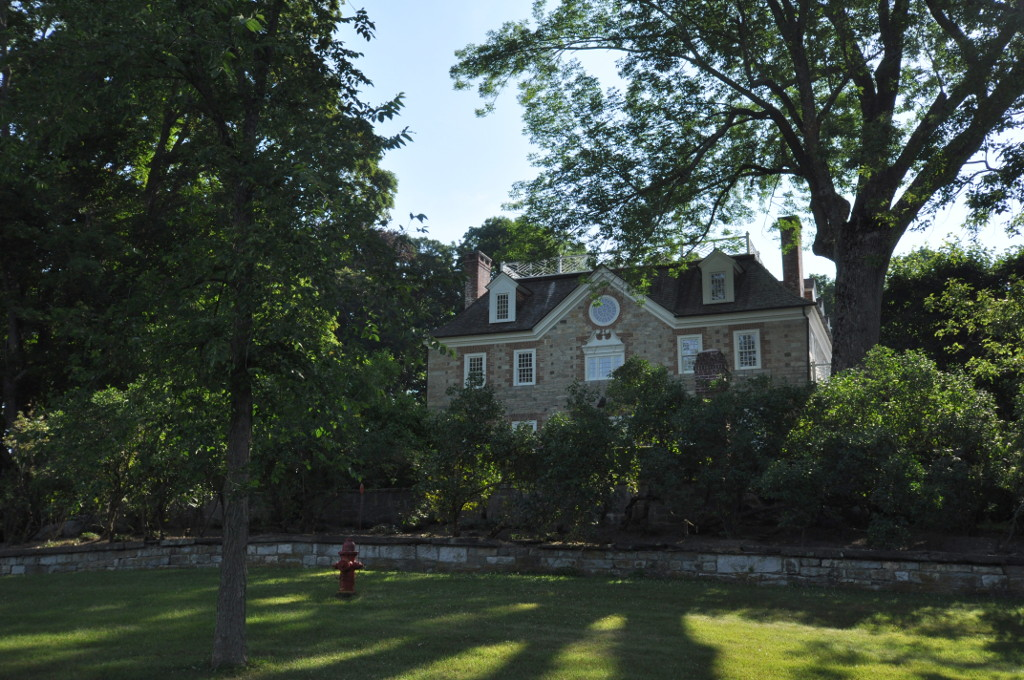

- Location within Connecticut Location within the United States
- Location: South Main Street, Sharon, Connecticut
- Coordinates: 41°52′9″N 73°28′32″W
- Area: 15 acres (6.1 ha)
- Built: 1765
- Architectural style: Colonial Revival, Georgian
- Part of: Sharon Historic District (ID93000257)
- NRHP reference No.: 82004475

Significant dates
- Added to NRHP: March 25, 1982
- Designated CP: April 15, 1993

The Governor Smith Homestead is a historic house on South Main Street in Sharon, Connecticut. Built between 1765 and 1777, this large stone house has been a distinctive presence on the Sharon Green for over 200 years. It was for many years the home of John Cotton Smith, Governor of Connecticut during the War of 1812, and a nephew of the house's builder, Simeon Smith. The house was listed on the National Register of Historic Places in 1982, and was included in the Sharon Historic District in 1993.

== Description and history ==
The Smith Homestead anchors the southernmost end of the long Sharon Green, a 1.5-mile (2.4 km) greensward that defines the town center. The southern half of the green is mainly residential, and has been modified to have a central roadway instead of two flanking ones, as seen in the northern section. The Smith House is located on the east side of South Main Street, just north of its crossing of an unnamed stream. The house is a large 2 1/2-story stone construction, built out of locally quarried stone and covered by a truncated hip roof. Its prominence is accentuated by the presence of stone retaining walls, which terrace the landscaped area around it on two sides. The flat area at the center of the roof is ringed by a balustrade, and corbelled brick chimneys rise from either side. The angled portion of the roof is pierced by gabled dormers, and by a one-bay gable above the main entrance. The interior follows a central hall plan, and retains many fine period finish elements.

Construction on this house was begun in 1765 by Simeon Smith, a prominent local doctor, pharmacist, and militia leader. Its oldest portion is the rear ell, which was occupied while construction of the main block continued. The stonework was supposedly overseen by an Italian craftsman brought in by Smith, who had traveled extensively in Europe. Finishing elements on the house were delayed by the American Revolutionary War. Smith conducted a meeting at the house in 1779 of several other medical professionals, which they styled as the first meeting of its kind in the new United States. Smith fell on hard times financially after the war, and turned the property over to his brother. John Cotton Smith, Smith's nephew, a prominent state politician who served as Governor and in the United States Congress, made this house is home. It remained in the Smith family until 1915.

== See also ==
- Simeon Smith Mansion, built in West Haven, Vermont by Smith in the 1790s
- Simeon Smith House (West Haven, Vermont), also built by Smith
- National Register of Historic Places listings in Litchfield County, Connecticut
