= Benjamin Smith House =

Benjamin Smith House may refer to:

- Benjamin Smith House (New Bern, North Carolina), listed on the NRHP in North Carolina
- Benjamin Smith House (Columbus, Ohio), listed on the NRHP in Ohio
