= Thomas Smith House =

Thomas Smith House may refer to:

- Tom Smith House, Elkins, AR, listed on the NRHP in Arkansas
- Thomas W. Smith House, Tennille, GA, listed on the NRHP in Georgia
- Thomas Smith House (New Castle, Kentucky), listed on the NRHP in Kentucky
- Thomas and Esther Smith House, Agawam, MA, listed on the NRHP in Massachusetts
- Thomas Smith House (Mount Laurel, New Jersey), listed on the NRHP in New Jersey
- Thomas J. and Amanda N. Smith House, Kaysville, UT, listed on the NRHP in Utah

== See also ==
- Smith House
