= George W. Smith House =

George W. Smith House may refer to:

in the United States (by state)

- George W. Smith House (Oak Park, Illinois), listed on the NRHP in Illinois
- George W. Smith House (Elizabethtown, Kentucky), Elizabethtown, Kentucky, listed on the National Register of Historic Places in Hardin County, Kentucky
- George W. Smith Homestead, Mattawamkeag, Maine, listed on the National Register of Historic Places in Penobscot County, Maine
- George W. Smith House (Geneva, Nebraska), Geneva, Nebraska, listed on the National Register of Historic Places in Fillmore County, Nebraska

== See also ==
- Smith House (disambiguation)
