= Shubel Smith House =

Historic house in Connecticut, United States

- U.S. National Register of Historic Places
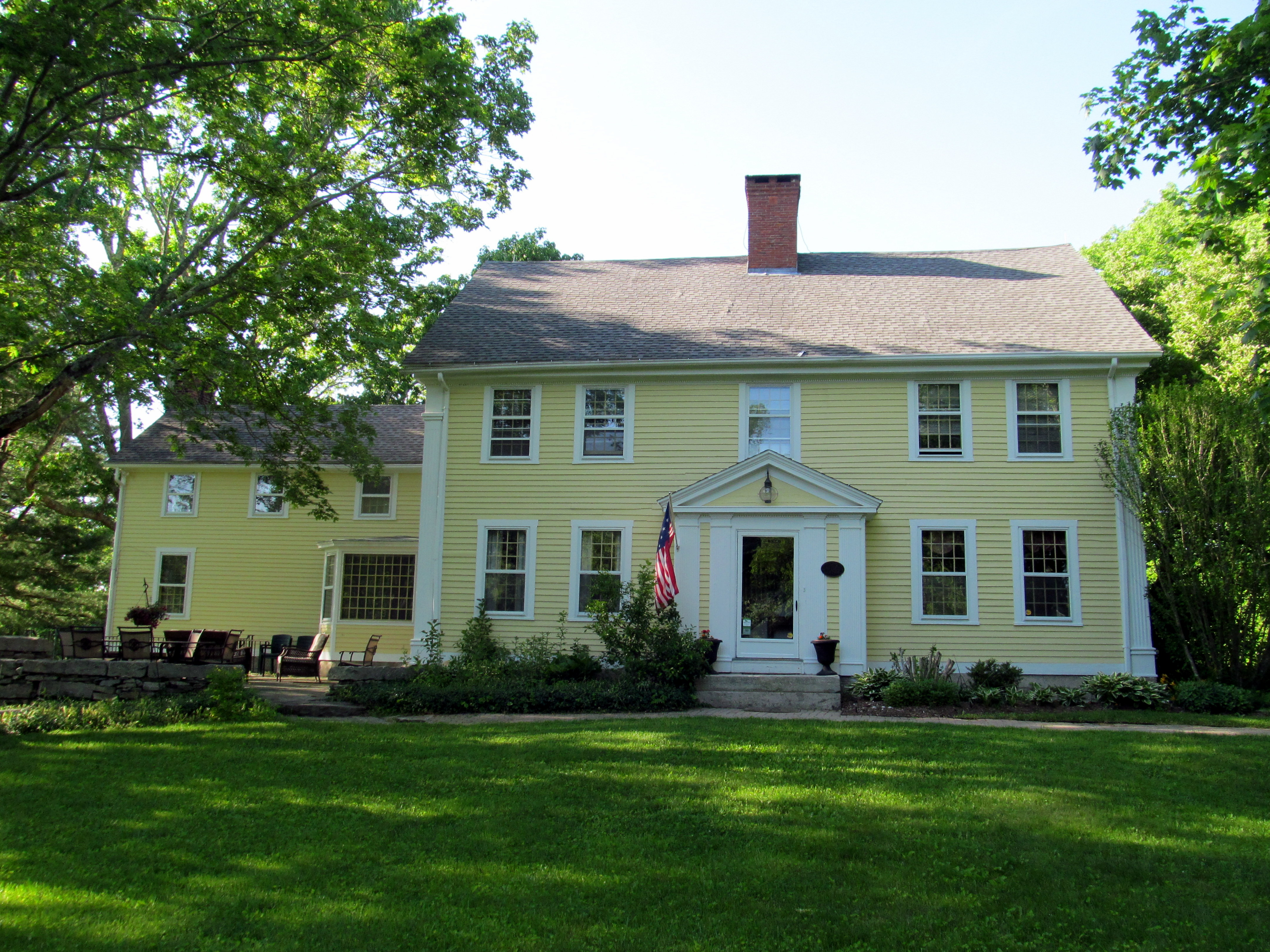
- Front view of the Shubel Smith House in 2014

- Location within Connecticut Location within the United States
- Location: 515 Pumpkin Hill Road, Ledyard, Connecticut
- Coordinates: 41°25′23″N 71°59′8″W
- Area: 6.5 acres (2.6 ha)
- Built: 1807
- Architectural style: Georgian, Federal
- NRHP reference No.: 96001462
- Added to NRHP: December 20, 1996

The Shubel Smith House, also known as Stonecroft, is a historic house at 515 Pumpkin Hill Road in Ledyard, Connecticut. It was built in 1807 as the estate of Shubel Smith, a sea captain, and is one of Ledyard's finest surviving farmhouses from that period. It was listed on the National Register of Historic Places in 1996. The listing included three contributing buildings on a 6.5-acre (2.6 ha) area, including the Georgian Colonial house and the "Yellow Barn" as well as a smaller outbuilding. Both of the large buildings have modernized interiors, serving as a bed and breakfast called Stonecroft Country Inn.

== Description and history ==
The Shubel Smith House is located in a rural setting of southeastern Ledyard, on the west side of Pumpkin Hill Road. The property's built infrastructure is basically that of a 19th-century farmstead, with the main house, a barn, and a shed/garage building. The barn is a 20th-century structure built on an older foundation; the original was destroyed in the New England Hurricane of 1938. The house is a 2 1/2-story wood-frame structure, with a gabled roof, central chimney, and clapboarded exterior. The main facade is five bays wide and symmetrically arranged, with a center entrance set in a projecting gabled vestibule. Building corners are adorned with pilasters. A two-story ell extends to the left side at a recess, with a modern bay window filling in part of the corner. The interior follows a modification to the typical center chimney plan: because of the larger entrance vestibule, the chimney stack is set further forward than normal, and the kitchen (placed behind the chimney) is thus larger than usual. The interior retains a number of original period features, and includes a loom in one of the second-floor chambers that appears to date to the house's construction.

The property is a small portion of a once-larger estate purchased in 1795 by Charles Smith for his son Shubel, apparently in anticipation of the latter's marriage the following year. Shubel Smith raised livestock for sale in the West Indies, and it is thought that some of the many stone walls on the property are related to penning the animals. He apparently first occupied the house then standing on the property, building this one in 1807 and recycling materials from the other one. The property remained in the hands of the Smith family until at least 1896.

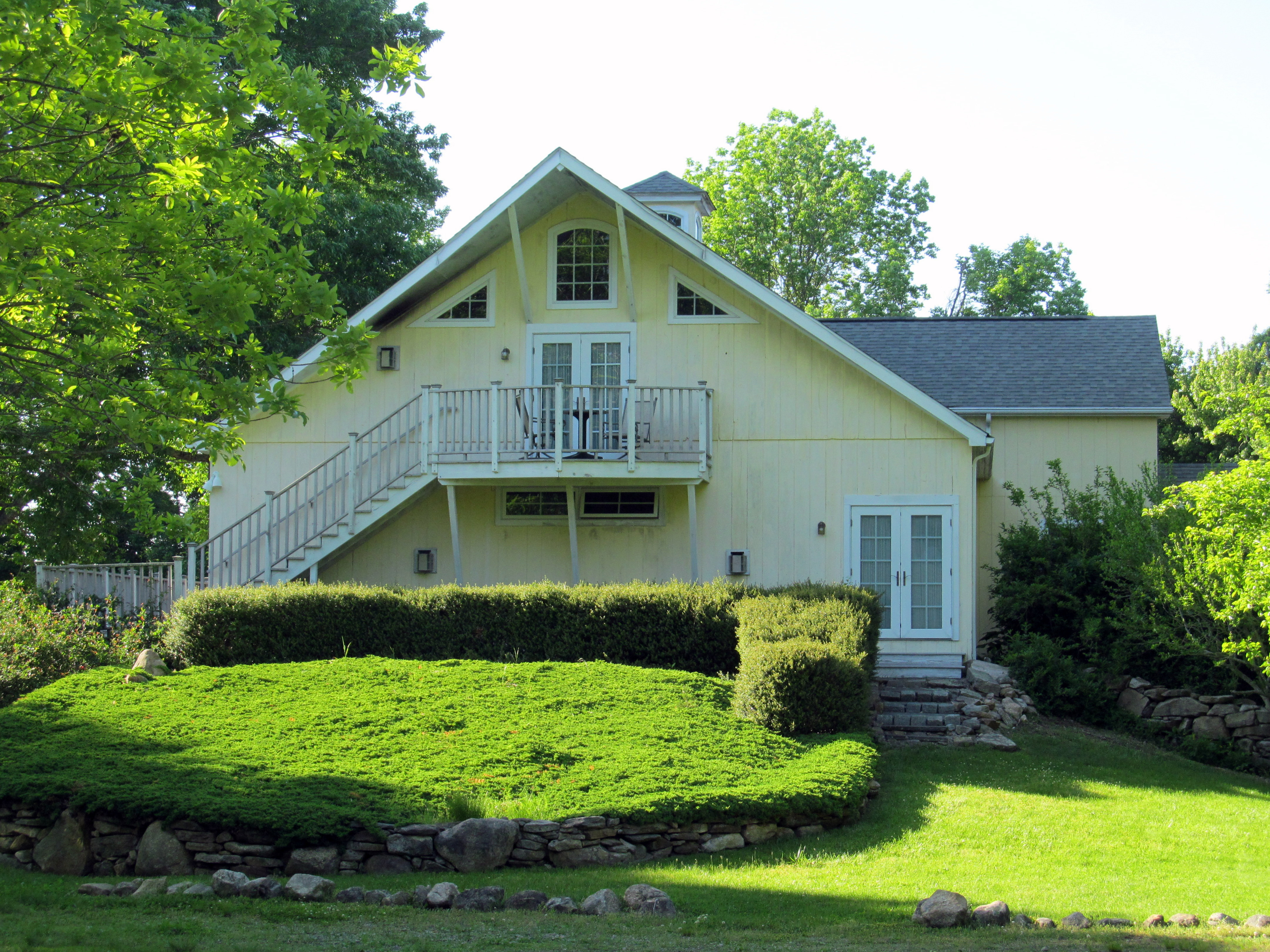
Side view of the "Yellow Barn"

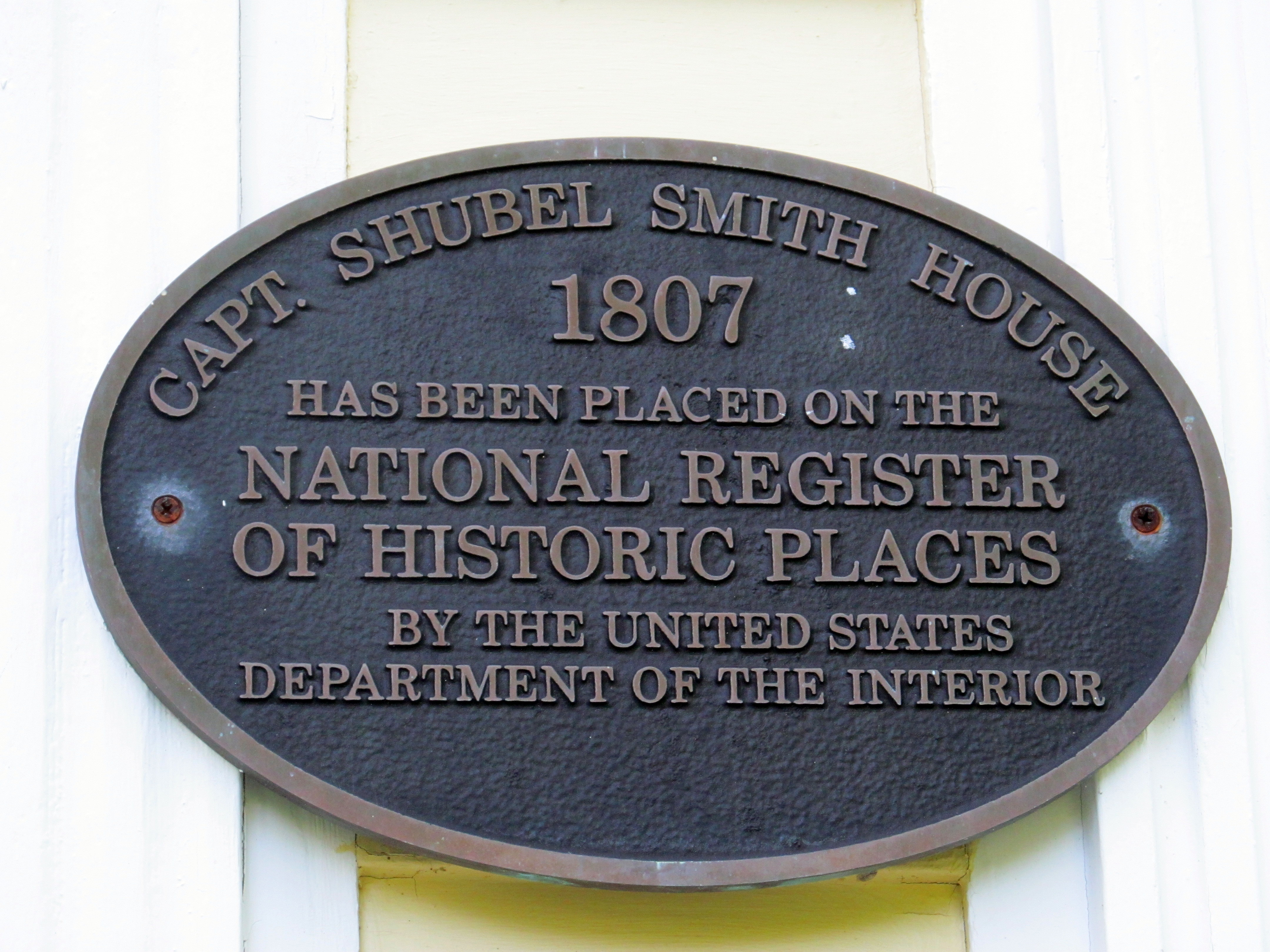
NRHP plaque on the house

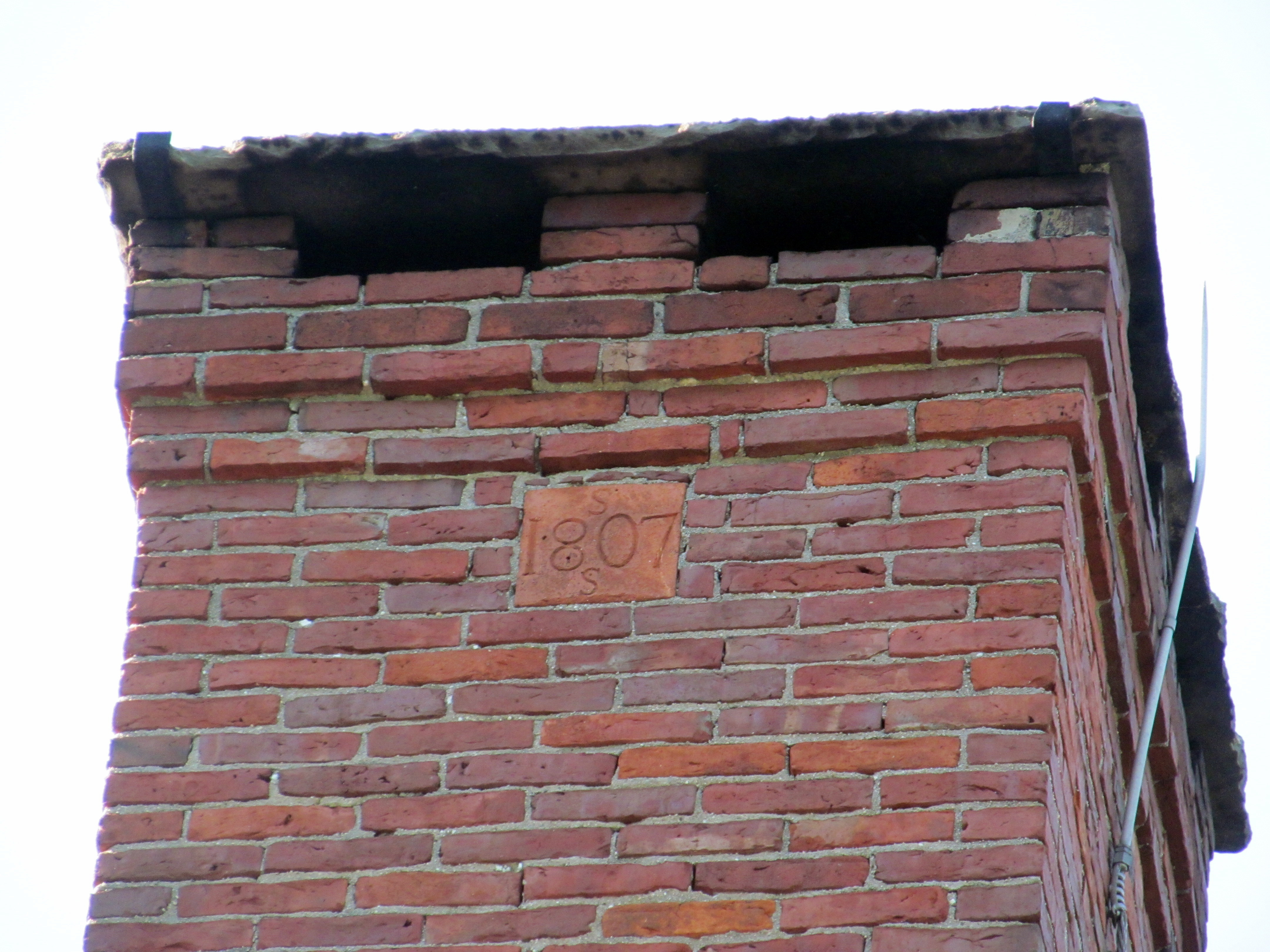
Brick reading "1807" in the chimney

== See also ==
- National Register of Historic Places listings in New London County, Connecticut
