= Warren B. Smith House =

Historic house in Utah, United States

- U.S. National Register of Historic Places
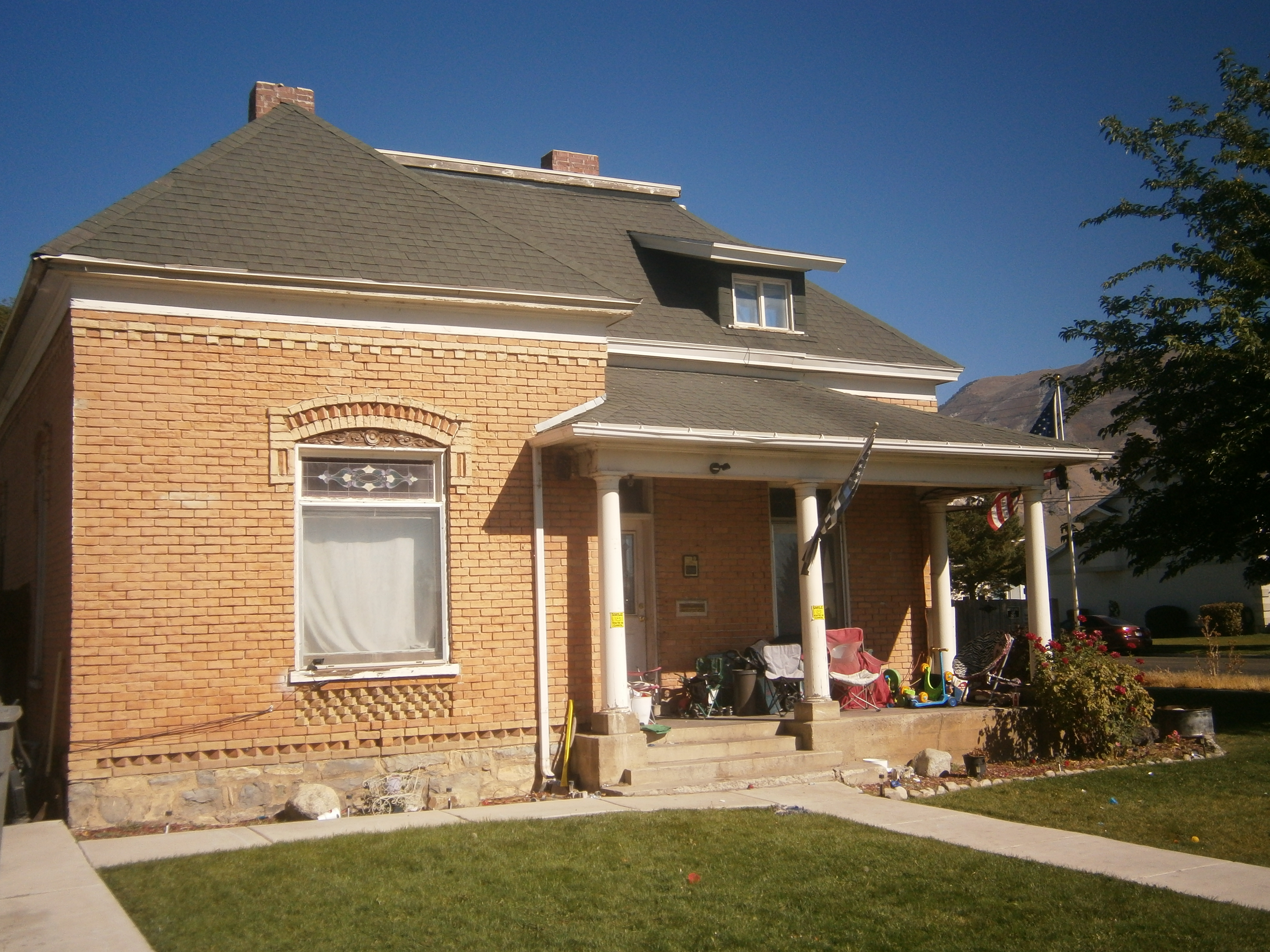

- Location within Utah Location within the United States
- Location: 589 E. Main St., American Fork, Utah
- Coordinates: 40°22′37″N 111°46′55″W
- Area: less than one acre
- Built: 1897
- Architectural style: Late Victorian
- NRHP reference No.: 79002513
- Added to NRHP: June 19, 1979

The Warren B. Smith House at 589 E. Main St. in American Fork, Utah, United States, was built in 1897. It was listed on the National Register of Historic Places in 1979.

== Late Victorian ==
The house is significant as an attractive and representative example "of the modest late-Victorian dwellings to be found in many of Utah's small towns," and for its association with Warren B. Smith, its builder. Smith was a blacksmith who became a leading citizen in American Fork, including serving on the city council. He spent four years in two full-time missions for the LDS church. He supported three wives, and took a fourth wife late in his life, at age 63, in 1907, and spent six months in the Utah Territorial Penitentiary for his violation of the Edmunds-Tucker Act. He led the American Fork choir for thirty years.
