= Alvord I. Smith House =

Historic house in Iowa, United States

- U.S. National Register of Historic Places
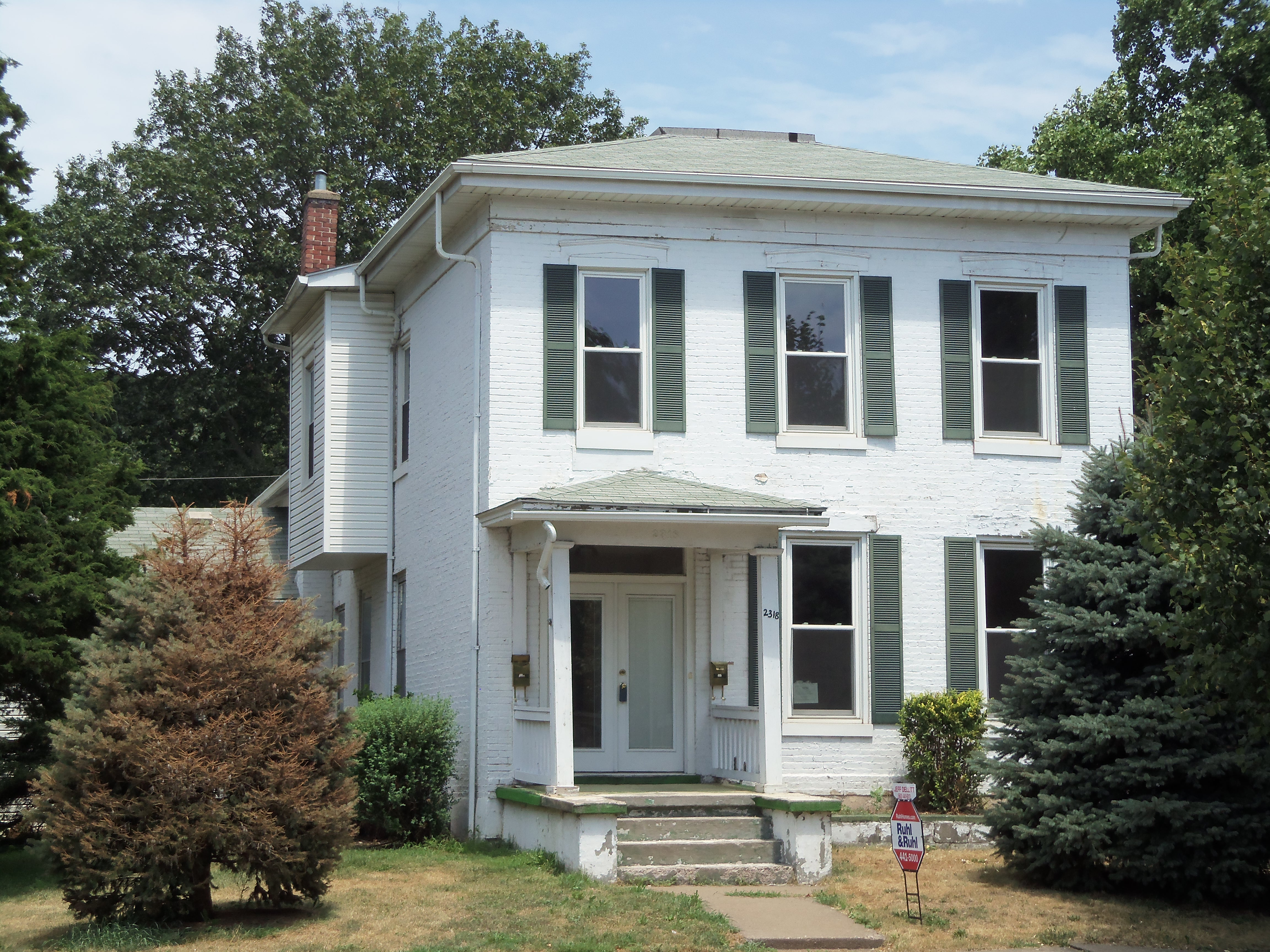

- Location within Iowa Location within the United States
- Location: 2318 W. 3rd St. Davenport, Iowa
- Coordinates: 41°31′21″N 90°36′50″W
- Area: less than one acre
- Built: 1868
- Architectural style: Italianate
- MPS: Davenport MRA
- NRHP reference No.: 83002507
- Added to NRHP: July 7, 1983

The Alvord I. Smith House is a historic building located in the West End of Davenport, Iowa, United States. The residence has been listed on the National Register of Historic Places since 1983.

== History ==
Alvord Smith was a farmer at the time he had this house built in 1868. In time he would become a general agent for the Charter Oak Life Insurance Company. Several other people owned the house after him and before Herman Steffen bought it around 1880. Steffen had retired as the manager of the St. Louis House and Saloon downtown when he bought this house.

== Architecture ==
The Alvord I. Smith House is a typical example of the simplified Italianate style house with Greek Revival elements built in mid-19th century Davenport. It features a nearly square, boxy form with a shallow hipped roof with wide eaves and a simplified cornice. The house also has cast iron lintels that are in the shape of shallow triangular pediments. A small porch frames the main entrance.
