= Ernest W. Smith House =

Historic house in California, United States

- U.S. National Register of Historic Places
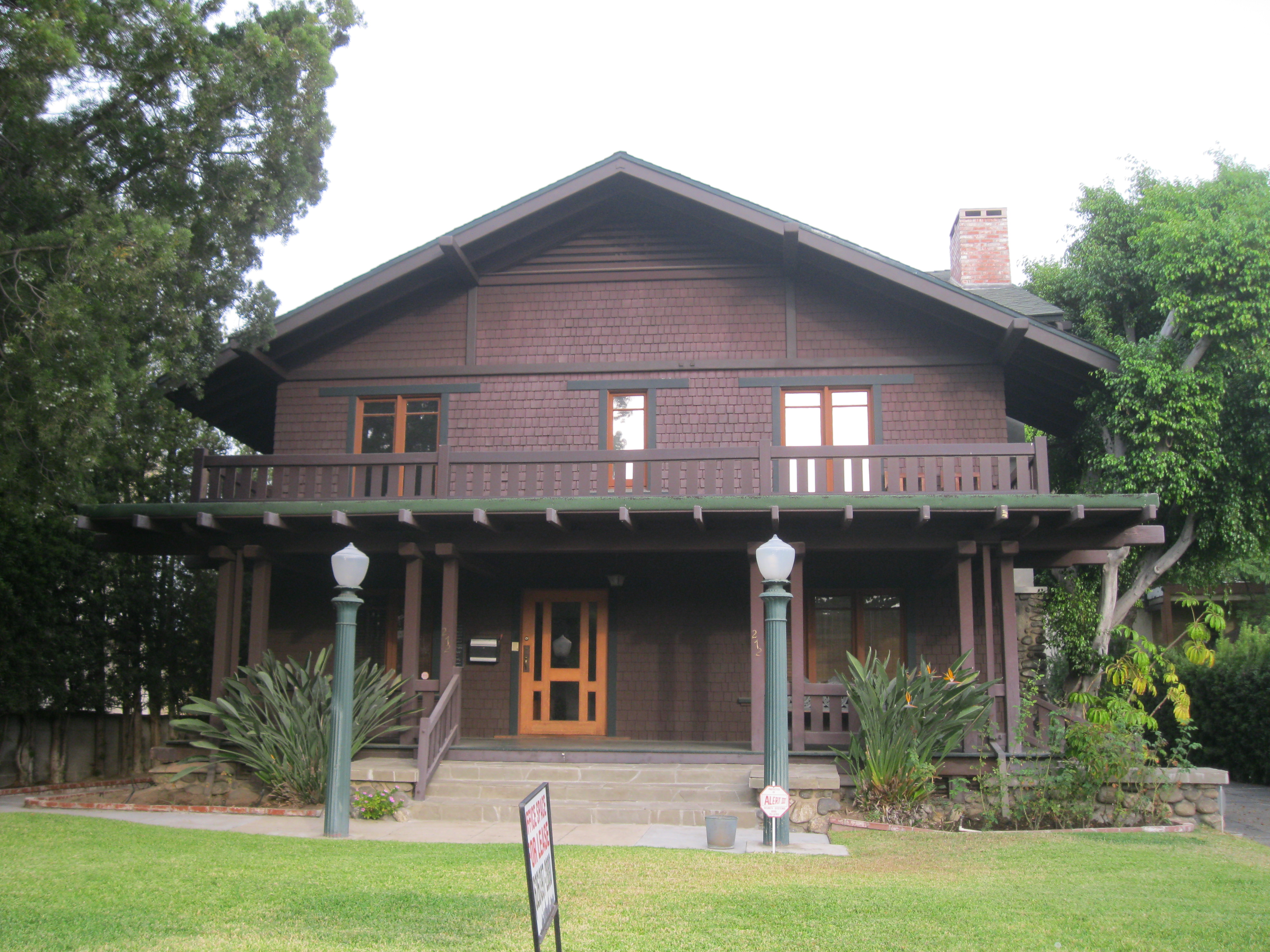

- Location within the Los Angeles metropolitan area Location within California Location within the United States
- Location: 272 S. Los Robles Ave., Pasadena, California
- Coordinates: 34°8′28″N 118°8′27″W
- Area: 1.9 acres (0.77 ha)
- Built: 1910
- Built by: Erickson, John
- Architect: Greene & Greene
- Architectural style: American Craftsman
- NRHP reference No.: 87002397
- Added to NRHP: January 14, 1988

The Ernest W. Smith House is a historic house located at 272 S. Los Robles Ave. in Pasadena, California. Prominent Pasadena architects Greene & Greene designed the American Craftsman house in 1910. The house was one of the last designed by Greene & Greene; however, its simple design is reminiscent of their earlier work. The house's interlocking gable roof with wide eaves was inspired by the Swiss chalet style, a design which Greene & Greene often incorporated into their work. The house's design also features exposed rafter tails, a full-length front porch, casement windows, and a wood shingle roof, all typical elements of Greene & Greene designs.

The house was added to the National Register of Historic Places on January 14, 1998.
