= Smith House (Searcy, Arkansas) =

Historic house in Arkansas, United States

- U.S. National Register of Historic Places
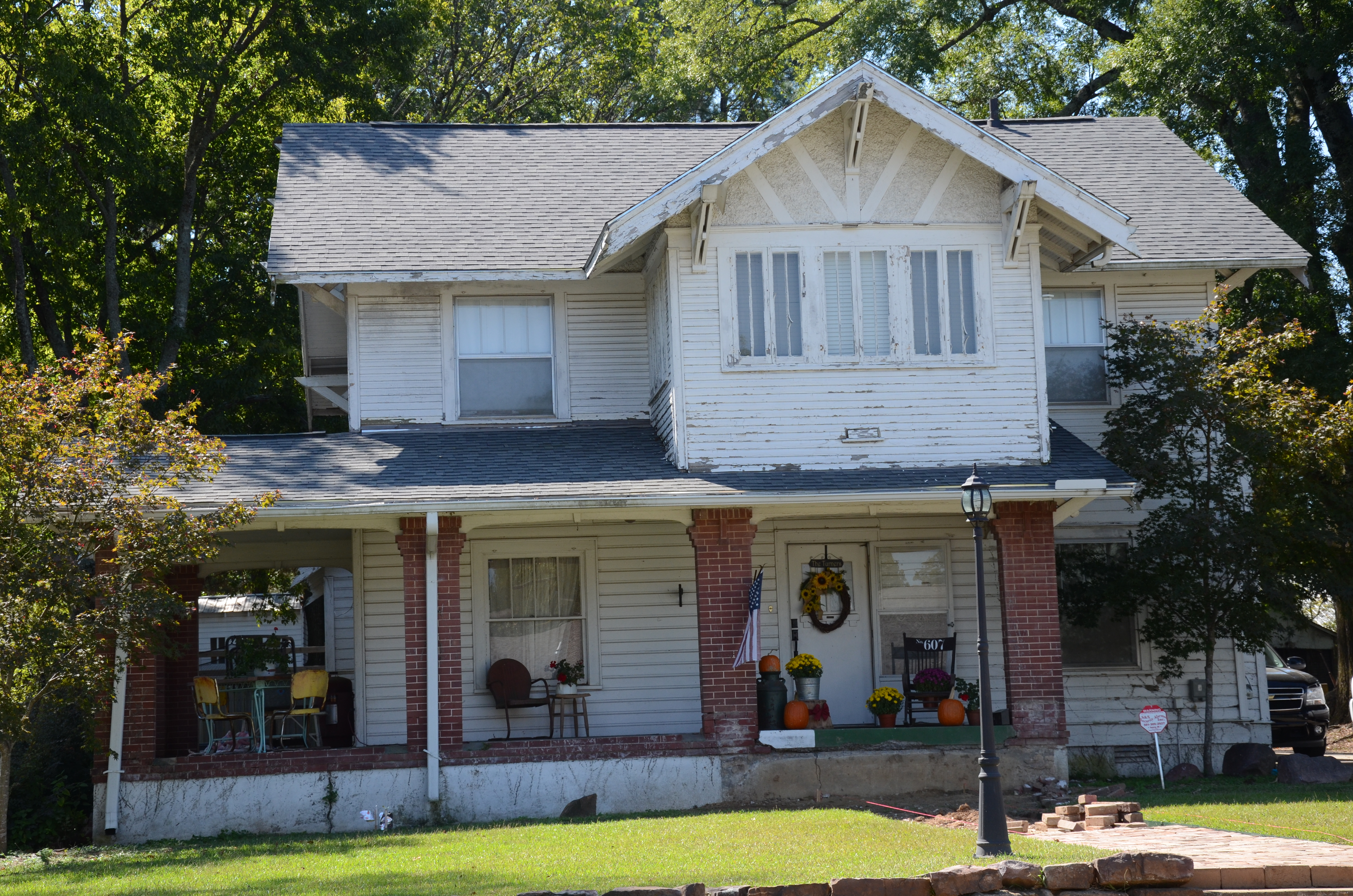

- Location within Arkansas Location within the United States
- Location: 607 W. Arch Ave., Searcy, Arkansas
- Coordinates: 35°15′0″N 91°44′36″W
- Area: less than one acre
- Built: 1920
- Architect: Sears, Roebuck & Co.
- Architectural style: Vernacular irregular plan
- MPS: White County MPS
- NRHP reference No.: 91001218
- Added to NRHP: September 5, 1991

The Smith House is a historic house at 607 West Arch Avenue in Searcy, Arkansas. Built in 1920, it is a rare local example of a prefabricated mail order house, produced by the Sears, Roebuck company as model #264P202 of the Sears Modern Homes. It is a two-story frame structure, with a side gable roof and novelty siding. The roof has extended eaves with exposed rafters and large brackets in the gable ends, and there is a projecting gable section in the center of the front facade. A porch wraps around to the left of this section, its shed roof supported by brick piers.

The house was listed on the National Register of Historic Places in 1991.

== See also ==
- National Register of Historic Places listings in White County, Arkansas
