= Edwin Smith House (Dayton, Ohio) =

Historic house in Ohio, United States

- U.S. National Register of Historic Places
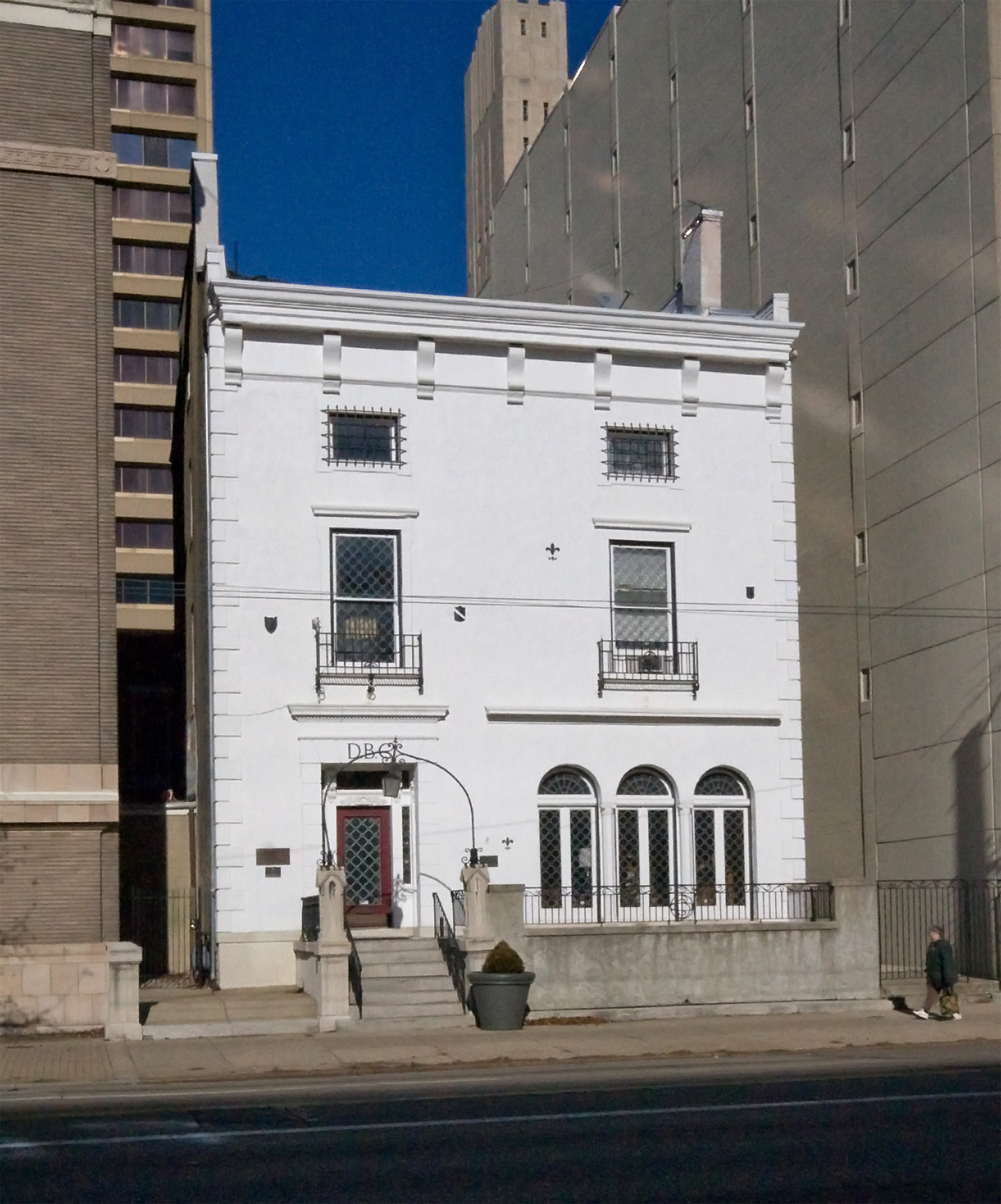

- Location within Ohio Location within the United States
- Location: 131 West Third Street, Dayton, Ohio
- Coordinates: 39°45′32″N 84°11′42″W
- Architectural style: Renaissance
- NRHP reference No.: 74001582
- Added to NRHP: August 13, 1974

The Edwin Smith House is an historic structure in Dayton, Ohio. It was added to the National Register of Historic Places on August 13, 1974. It is also known as the Dayton Bicycle Club and Craighead House.

Edwin Smith (1803–1876) was a doctor, druggist, and the founder and first president of the Montgomery County Medical Society. He had the house built in 1850 and used it as his private residence until it was sold to attorney Samuel Craighead in 1872. The side of the structure features a highwater marker from the Great Flood of 1913. Established in 1884, the Dayton Bicycle Club moved into the house in 1915. It was added to the National Register of Historic Places in 1974.

== See also ==
- National Register of Historic Places listings in Dayton, Ohio
