= William R. Smith House =

- U.S. National Register of Historic Places
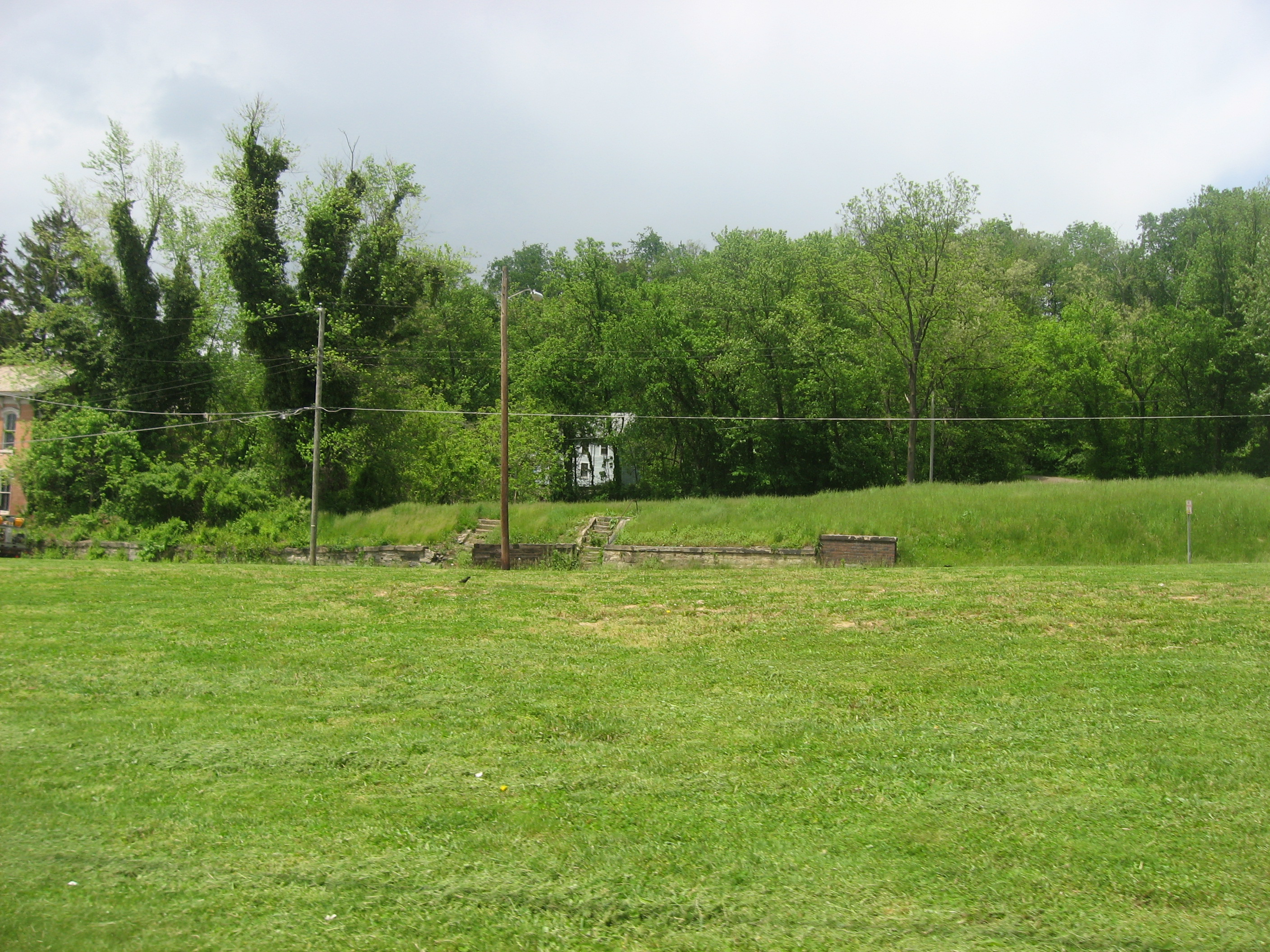
- Site of Smith House

- Location within Ohio Location within the United States
- Location: 920 Marietta St., Zanesville, Ohio
- Coordinates: 39°56′10″N 82°00′09″W
- Area: less than one acre
- Built: 1894
- Architect: Lindsay, H.C.
- Architectural style: Richardsonian Romanesque
- NRHP reference No.: 82003627
- Added to NRHP: June 1, 1982

The William R. Smith House, at 920 Marietta St. in Zanesville, Ohio, was built in 1894. It was listed on the National Register of Historic Places in 1982. It has been demolished.
