= Daniel Smith House (Prescott, Wisconsin) =

Historic house in Wisconsin, United States

- U.S. National Register of Historic Places
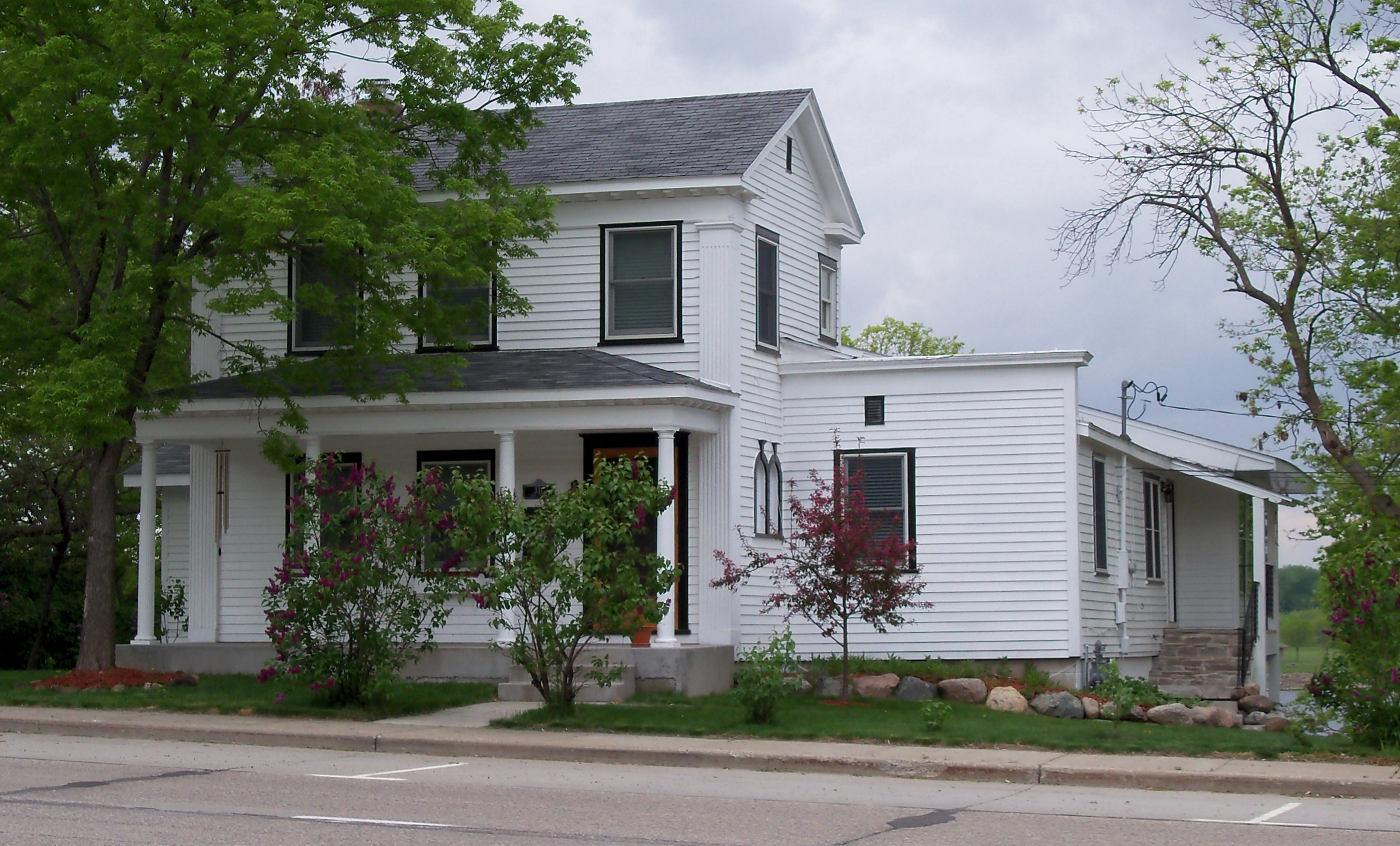
- Daniel Smith House

- Location within Wisconsin Location within the United States
- Interactive map showing the location of Daniel Smith House
- Location: 331 N. Lake St., Prescott, Wisconsin
- Coordinates: 44°45′02″N 92°48′11″W
- Area: less than one acre
- Built: 1855
- Architectural style: Greek Revival
- NRHP reference No.: 84003775
- Added to NRHP: March 15, 1984

The Daniel Smith House is located in Prescott, Wisconsin.

The original section of this house, built in about 1855, is a wood-frame structure built on a stone foundation. It displays many features found in the Greek Revival style of architecture, including: low-pitch gable ends, fluted pilaster corner boards, boxes cornice with dentils and a plain frieze, and a full-front porch with Doric columns. In about 1870 a one-story clapboarded addition was made to the southwest corner of the house. A water tower, located to the northeast of the house, a gazebo located to the west of the south, and rock walls were built in about 1903.

The Daniel Smith house is locally significant due to its association with Prescott, Wisconsin's early settlement and historical development. The owners of the house between its construction in about 1855 and 1889 were instrumental in the establishment and support of many of the city's earliest commercial, civic, social, educational, governmental, and political activities.

== History ==
The house was originally built for Daniel Smith, a local politician. His wife, Salome, also operated a school in it. Another politician, Norman Dunbar, purchased the house in 1864. Dunbar later sold it to Matthew H. Dill in 1871, who lived in it until 1889.

The house was added to the National Register of Historic Places in 1984 and to the State Register of Historic Places in 1989.
