= William G. Smith House (Davenport, Iowa) =

Historic house in Iowa, United States

- U.S. National Register of Historic Places
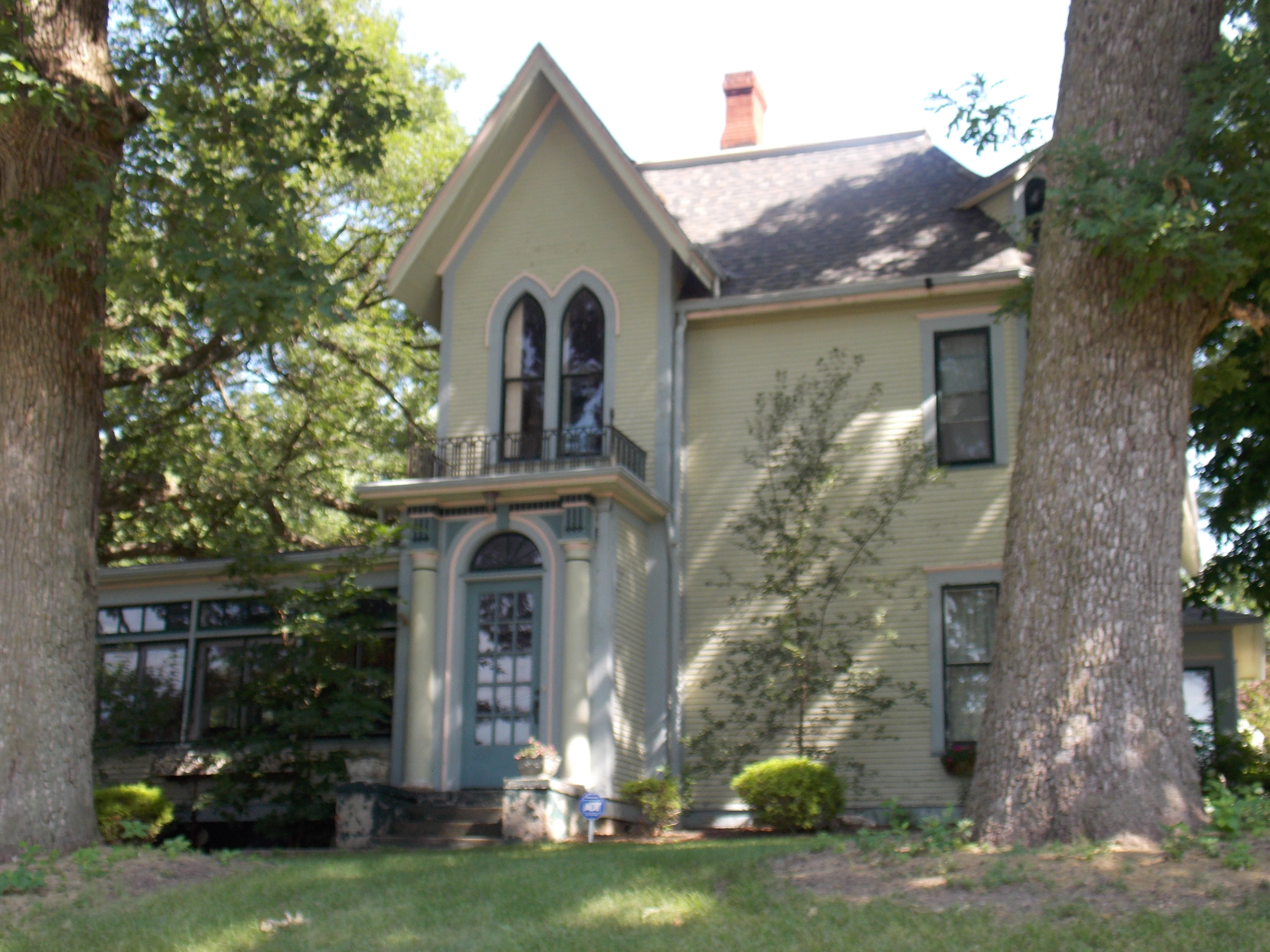
- The house from East Tenth Street

- Location within Iowa Location within the United States
- Location: 1002 Bridge St. Davenport, Iowa
- Coordinates: 41°31′49″N 90°33′30″W
- Area: less than one acre
- Built: 1894
- Architectural style: Queen Anne; Colonial Revival
- MPS: Davenport MRA
- NRHP reference No.: 84001566
- Added to NRHP: April 5, 1984

The William G. Smith House is a historic building located on the east side of Davenport, Iowa, United States. It has been listed on the National Register of Historic Places since 1984.

== History ==
William G. Smith, who was the president of A.J. Smith and Sons, had this house built in 1894. The firm was started by his father and dealt in retail furniture and carpets sales.

== Architecture ==
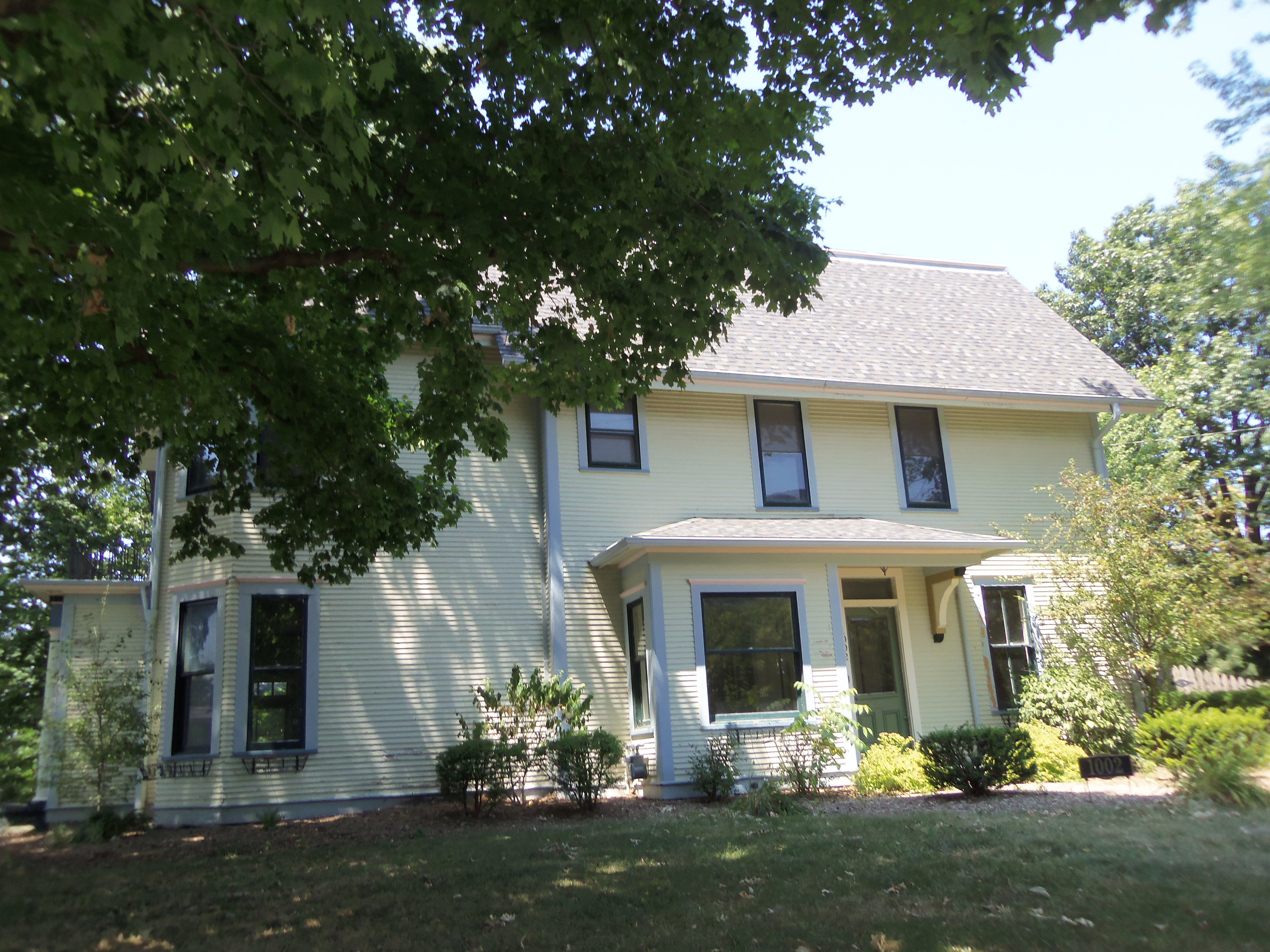
The house from Bridge Street

This two-story, frame house follows an irregular plan. It is eclectic in nature in that its builder borrowed from several architectural styles that are disassociated chronologically and based on a personal aesthetic. Though the practice was not uncommon in late 19th-century Davenport the other examples of eclecticism are transitional from one style to another. The Smith House features a complex roofscape that begins with a large main roof shaped as a truncated asymmetrical gable in the back and a neo-mansard in the front. There are three gables on the west side of the house with one of them perpendicular to the other two. One of the more eclectic features of the structure is the Gothic Revival front gable located above a Colonial Revival entrance. The entrance-way features engaged columns, a semi-circular fanlight, and a columned porch at the southwest corner. The house is located on a large corner lot with shaded grounds that contribute to its sense of prominence.
