= William P. Smith House (Stickney, South Dakota) =

Historic house in South Dakota, United States

- U.S. National Register of Historic Places
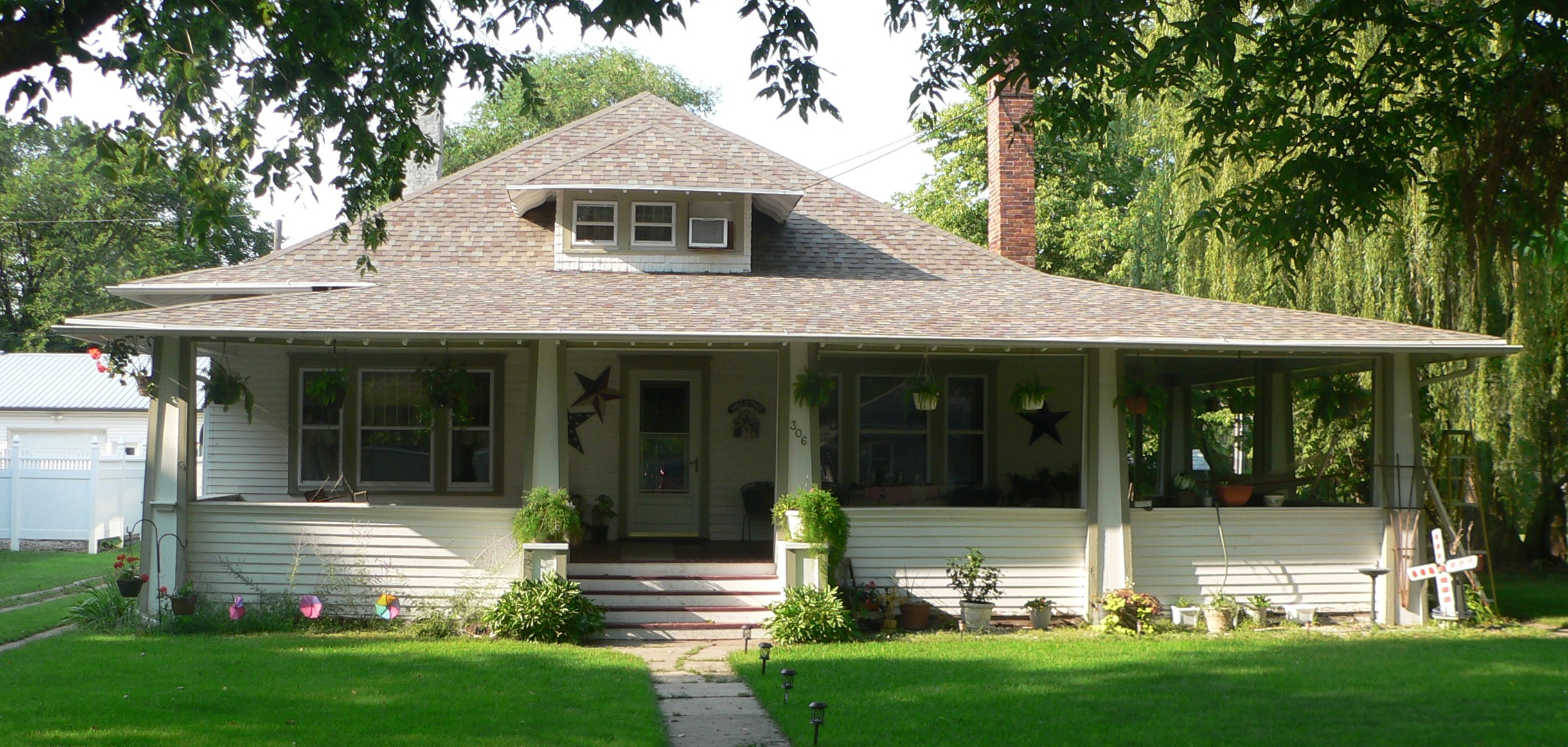

- Location within South Dakota Location within the United States
- Location: 306 N. Third Ave., Stickney, South Dakota
- Coordinates: 43.592359°N 98.438354°W
- Architectural style: Bungalow/craftsman
- NRHP reference No.: 04000471
- Added to NRHP: May 19, 2004

The William P. Smith House is a house in Stickney, South Dakota. It was designed in the bungalow and craftsman style by Keith Architect Service. The house was added to the National Register of Historic Places in 2004.

It was deemed notable "as a fine example of a Bungalow/Craftsman home in South Dakota. It is significant locally as a hipped roof subtype of this style."
