= Henry W. Smith House =

Historic house in Indiana, United States

- U.S. National Register of Historic Places
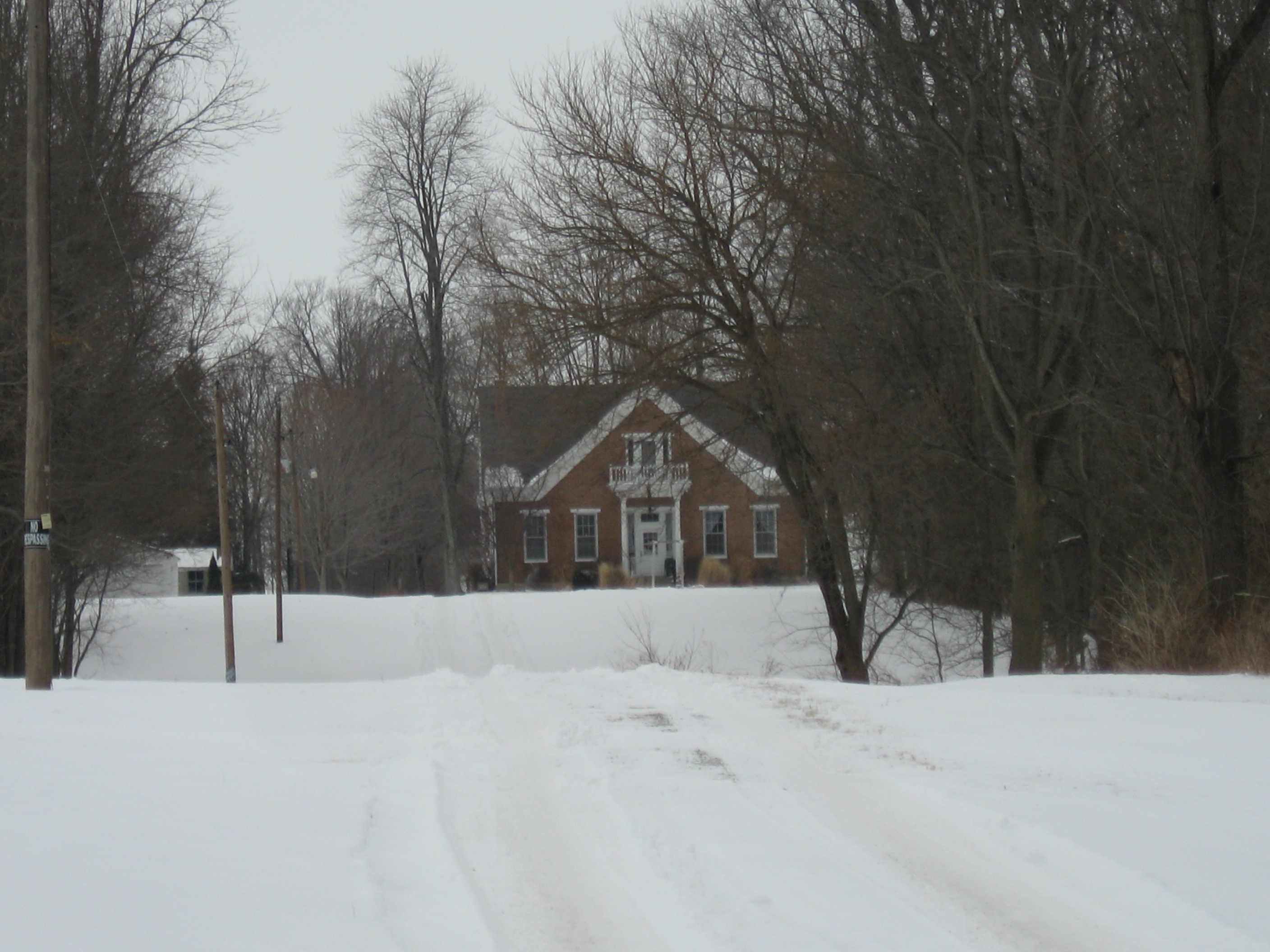
- Henry W. Smith House, January 2011

- Location within Indiana Location within the United States
- Location: 5 miles (8 km) west of Kokomo in Clay Township, Howard County, Indiana
- Coordinates: 40°28′41″N 86°13′41″W
- Area: 4 acres (1.6 ha)
- Built: 1859
- Architectural style: Mid 19th Century Revival, Italianate
- NRHP reference No.: 79000019
- Added to NRHP: March 9, 1979

Henry W. Smith House is a historic home located in Clay Township, Indiana. It was built in 1859, and is a two-story, brick dwelling on a fieldstone foundation. While primarily Italianate in style, the house incorporates elements of Federal, Gothic Revival, and Greek Revival styles. It has a steep cross-gable and features a front porch with Tuscan order columns.

It was listed on the National Register of Historic Places in 1979.
