= Edwin Smith House (Wellington, Kansas) =

Historic house in Kansas, United States

- U.S. National Register of Historic Places
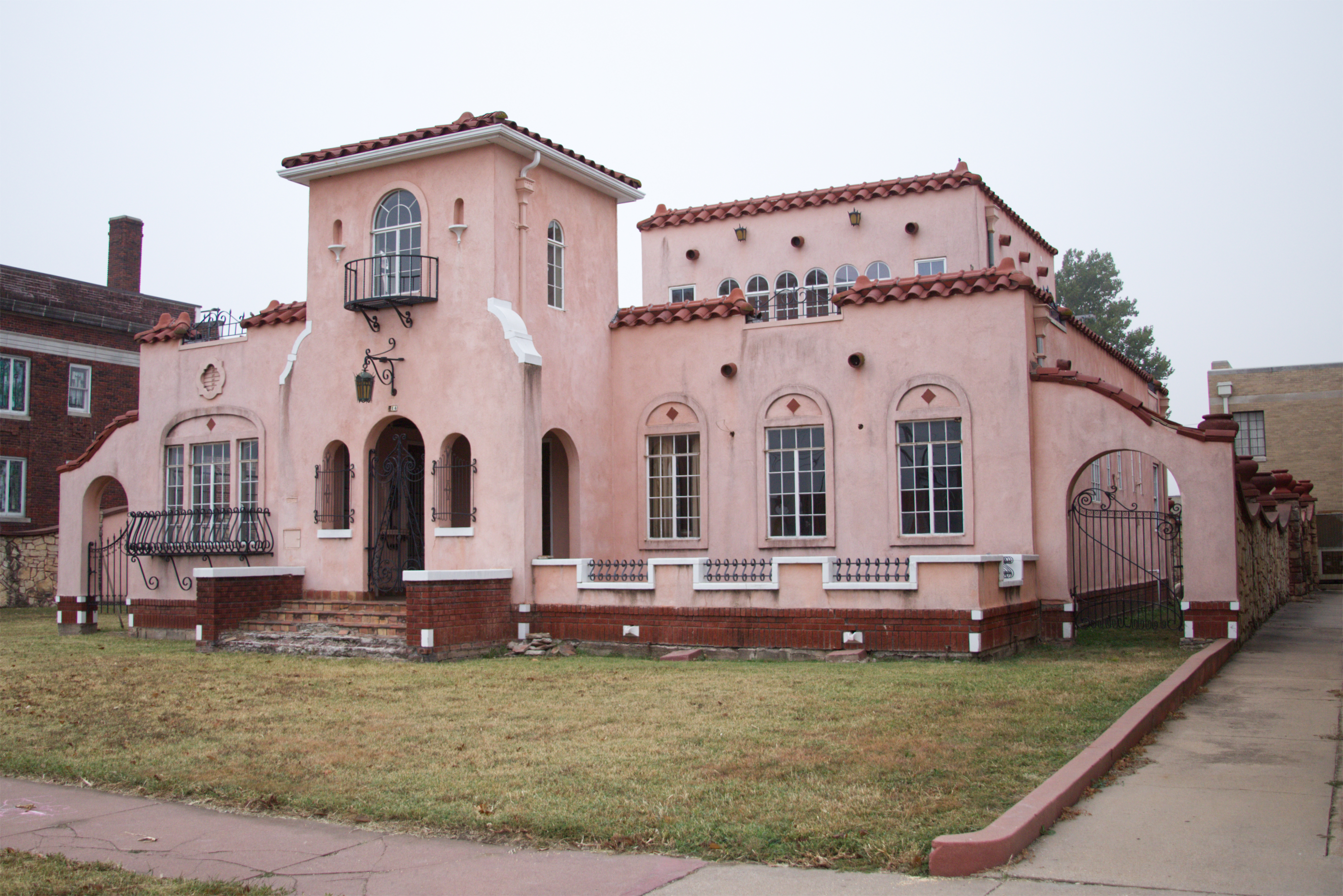
- Edwin Smith House (Wellington, Kansas)

- Location within Kansas Location within the United States
- Location: 114 S. Jefferson, Wellington, Kansas
- Coordinates: 37°15′54″N 97°23′58″W
- Area: less than one acre
- Built: 1935
- Architect: Charles, Ellis and Co.
- Architectural style: Mission/Spanish Revival, Colonial Revival
- NRHP reference No.: 04000450
- Added to NRHP: May 19, 2004

The Edwin Smith House in Wellington, Kansas was built in 1935. Also known as the Pink House, it was listed on the National Register of Historic Places in 2004.

It has a 60 feet (18 m)-long facade topped by a parapet. It originally featured pink stucco. It is Spanish eclectic in style, and unusual in its small-town Kansas setting. The house is surrounded on all sides by both the First Baptist Church of Wellington and the United Methodist Church.
