= Simeon P. Smith House =

Historic house in New Hampshire, US

- U.S. National Register of Historic Places
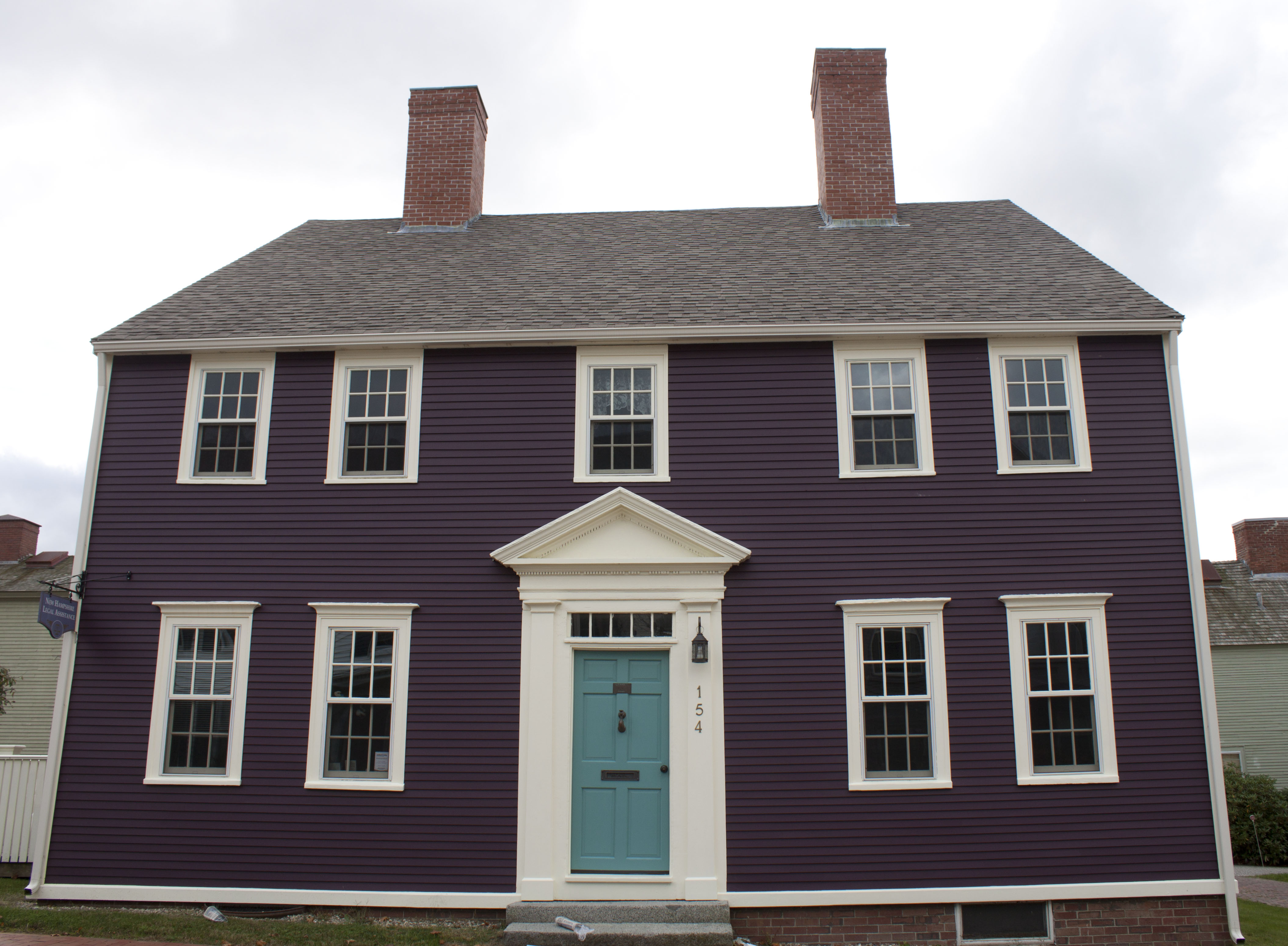

- Location within New Hampshire Location within the United States
- Location: 154 High St., The Hill, Portsmouth, New Hampshire
- Coordinates: 43°4′43″N 70°45′35″W
- Area: less than one acre
- Built: 1810–11
- Architectural style: Federal
- NRHP reference No.: 72000088
- Added to NRHP: November 14, 1972

The Simeon P. Smith House is a historic house at 154 High Street in Portsmouth, New Hampshire. Built in 1810–11, it is a fine example of a Federal-style duplex, built for a local craftsman, and one of a modest number of such houses to survive a devastating fire in 1813. It was listed on the National Register of Historic Places on November 14, 1972.

== Description and history ==
The Simeon P. Smith House is located on The Hill, a cluster of historic properties south of Deer and High streets which was created as part of a road widening project. It is located facing High Street on the cluster's northeastern edge. It is a 2 1/2-story wood-frame building, with a gabled roof and interior chimneys. Its central doorway is framed by pilasters and has a triangular pediment above a four-light transom window. Windows are framed by delicate Federal period moulding. Brick chimneys are set on either side of the roof. The interior includes Federal-style cornices, and a fine carved arch in the central hall. Although many rooms retain original Federal period styling, some were altered by subsequent owners to have simpler Greek Revival elements. A secondary entrance has also been added to one of the sides.

The Federal-style house was built between 1810 and 1811 for Simeon P. Smith, a Portsmouth cooper. As one of the few middle-class dwellings to survive the Portsmouth fire of 1813, the house serves as an example of a tradesman's home in Portsmouth in the early 1800s. The house originally stood on the north side of Deer Street, facing south.

== See also ==
- National Register of Historic Places listings in Rockingham County, New Hampshire
