= William Smith House (Wrightstown, Pennsylvania) =

Historic house in Pennsylvania, United States

- U.S. National Register of Historic Places
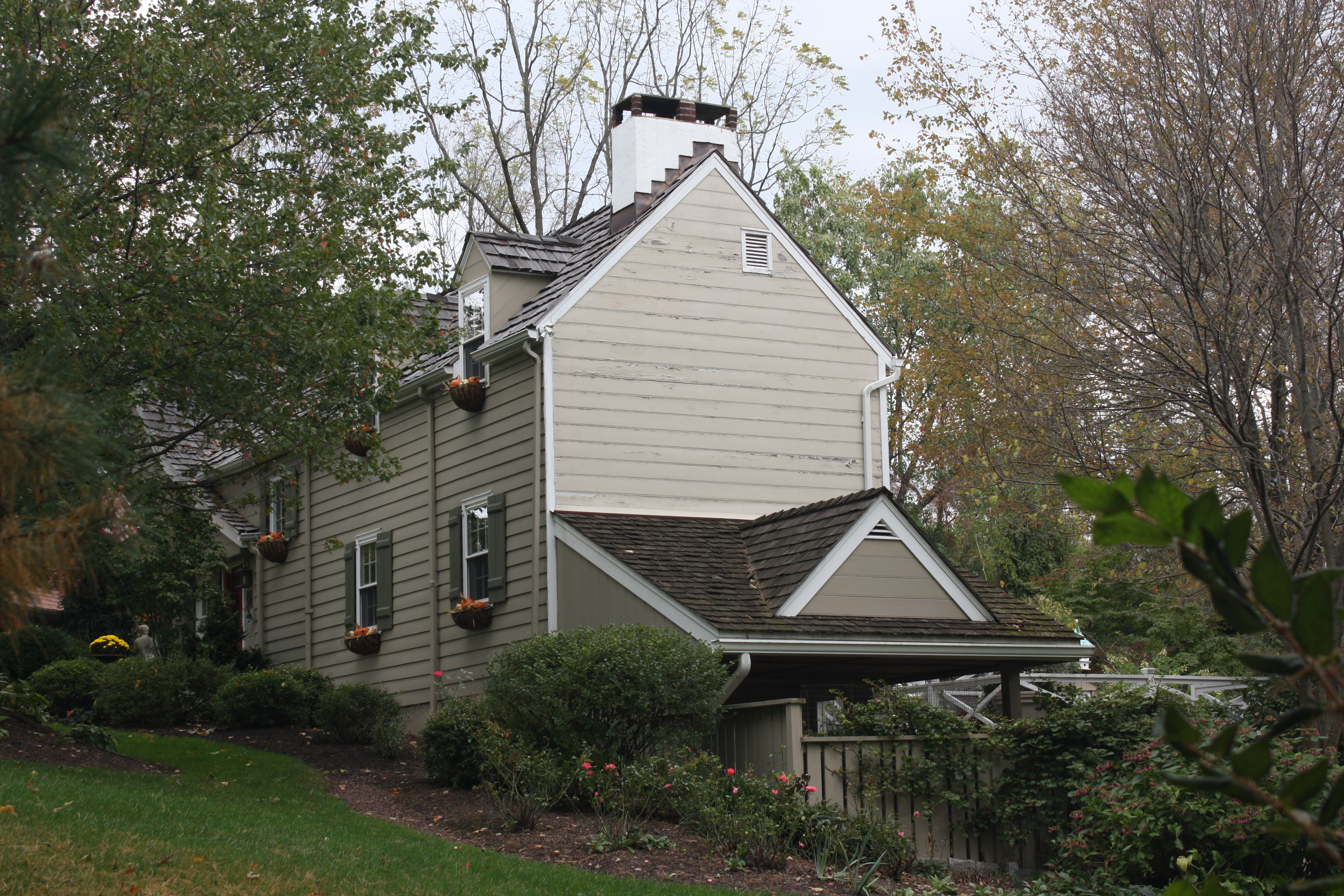
- William Smith House. October 2012.

- Location within Pennsylvania Location within the United States
- Location: Mud and Penns Park Rd., Wrightstown, Pennsylvania
- Coordinates: 40°15′46.9″N 74°59′25.6″W
- Area: 2.7 acres (1.1 ha)
- Built: 1686, 1690, 1965, 1968
- NRHP reference No.: 77001131
- Added to NRHP: April 13, 1977

The William Smith House, also known as Brooks, is an historic home that is located in Wrightstown, Bucks County, Pennsylvania, United States.

The oldest structure in Wrightstown and one of the oldest in the nation, it was added to the National Register of Historic Places in 1974.

== History and architectural features ==
The original section of this historic structure was built in 1686, and was a two-story, walnut log cabin. A fieldstone addition was built in 1690. The log section was subsequently covered in clapboard. Sympathetic modern additions were built in 1965 and 1968. It is the oldest structure in Wrightstown and one of the oldest in the nation.
