= Samuel Smith House (East Lyme, Connecticut) =

Historic house in Connecticut, United States

- U.S. National Register of Historic Places
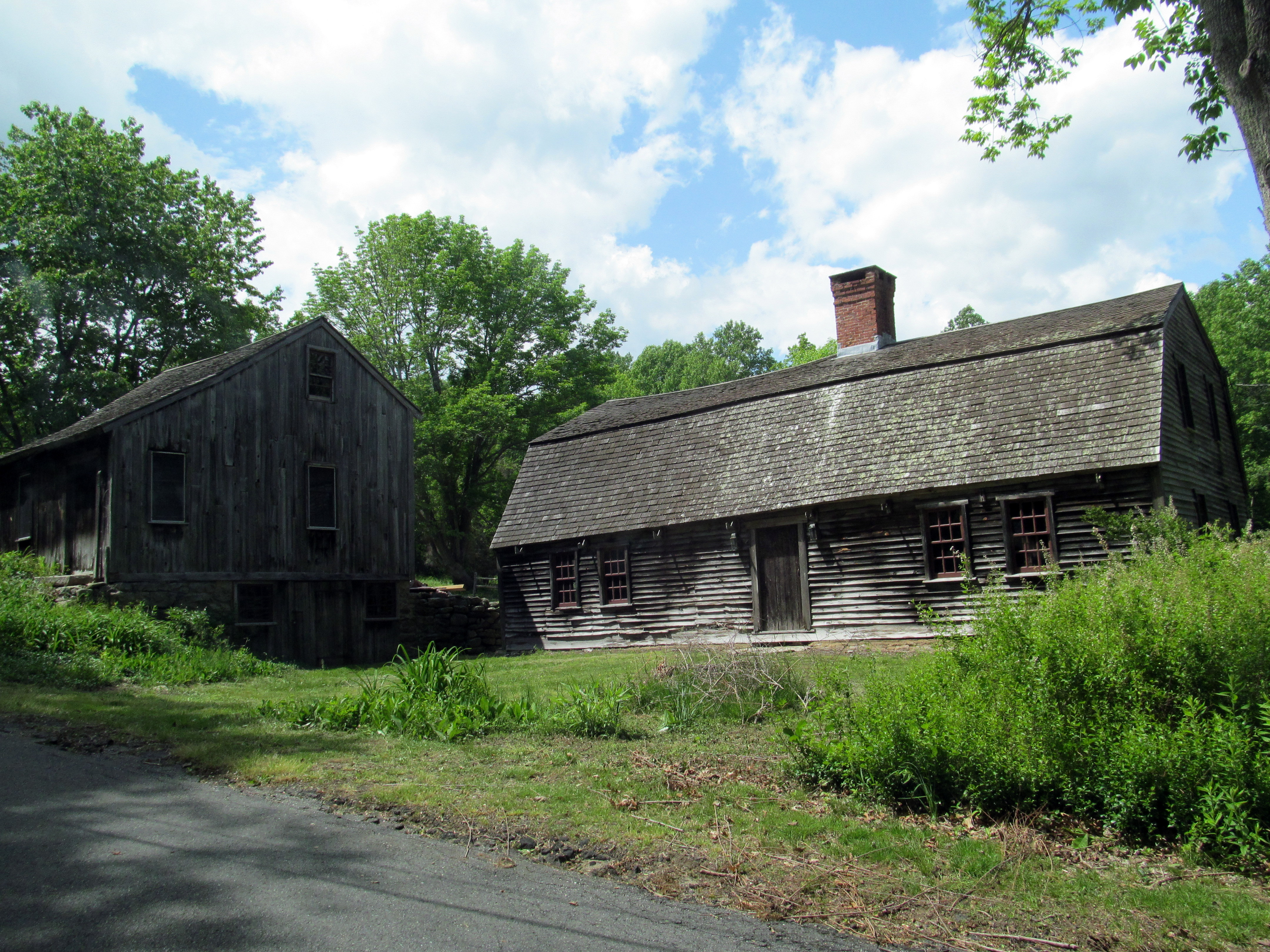
- Samuel Smith House in 2014

- Location within Connecticut Location within the United States
- Location: 82 Plants Dam Road, East Lyme, Connecticut
- Coordinates: 41°20′28″N 72°14′52″W
- Area: 30 acres (12 ha)
- Built: 1700
- Architectural style: First Period
- NRHP reference No.: 79002668
- Added to NRHP: June 4, 1979

The Samuel Smith House is a historic First Period house at 82 Plants Dam Road in East Lyme, Connecticut. With a construction history dating to about 1700, it is one of the oldest buildings in the community, exhibiting a pattern of architectural changes over the 18th century. The house was added to the National Register of Historic Places on June 4, 1979.

== Description and history ==
The Samuel Smith House is located in a rural setting in western East Lyme, on the north side of Plants Dam Road a short way west of its junction with North Bride Brook Road. It is a 1 1/2-story gambrel-roofed Cape style house, with clapboard and shingle siding, a five bay facade, and a large central chimney. The facade is slightly asymmetrical, with the entrance near its center. The interior follows a central chimney plan, with the east side of the house exhibiting construction methods of the early 18th century, as well as period featheredged wood paneling. There is also a rare surviving fireplace in the basement, indicative that it probably served as a summer kitchen.

The oldest portion of the house, its east side, was built c. 1700, and the main block reached its present size c. 1730. The house was built on land that had been granted to Thomas Bull, one of the founders of Hartford, for his service in the Pequot War of 1637. In 1692 Thomas Bull's sons sold the land to Nehemiah Smith, Jr. In 1698 Bull transferred it to his second son, Samuel, who built this house near the Niantic River. The house passed out of the Smith family in 1746.

== See also ==
- National Register of Historic Places listings in New London County, Connecticut
