= Daniel Smith House (Huntington, New York) =

Historic house in New York, United States

- U.S. National Register of Historic Places
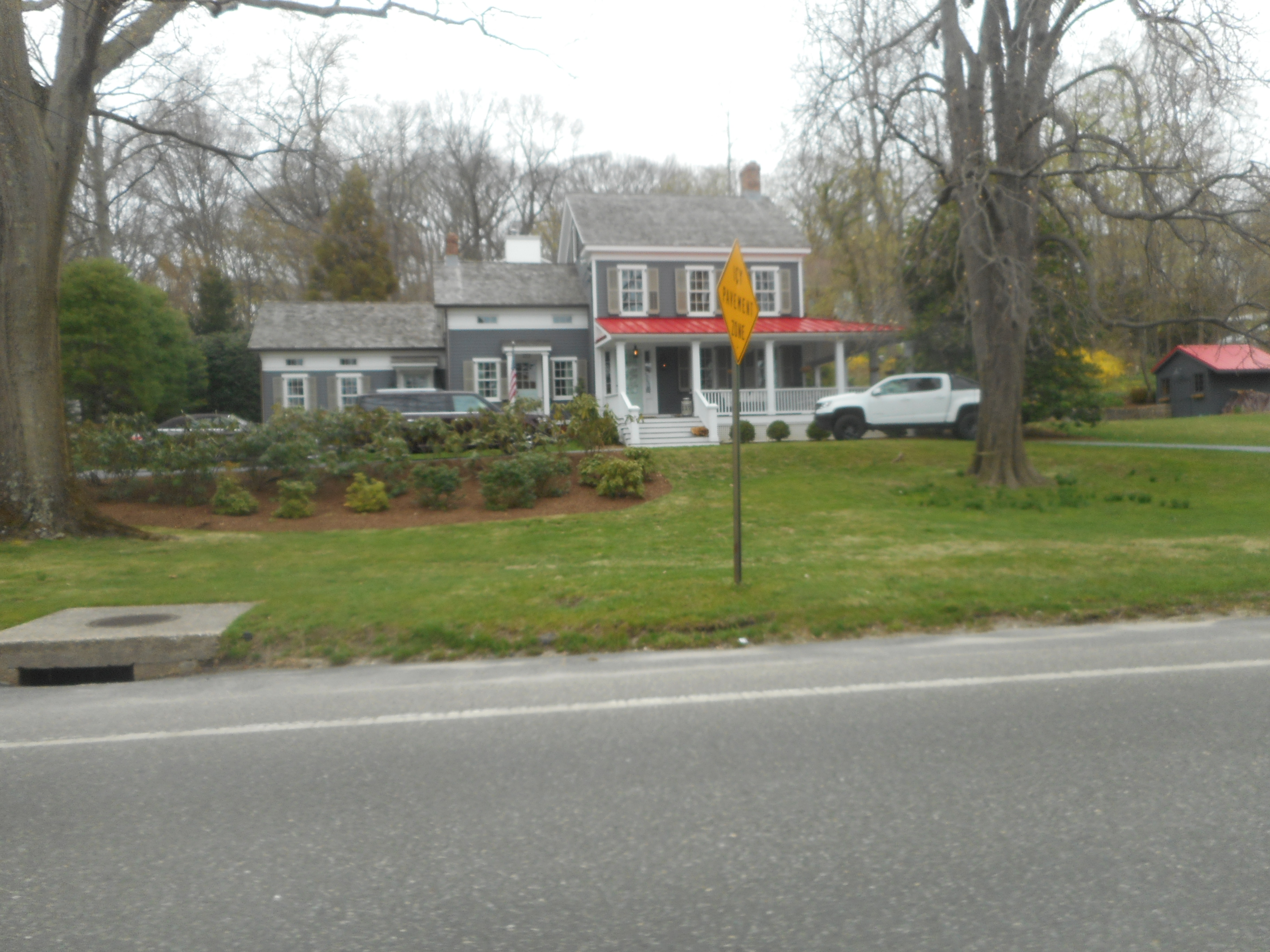
- The Daniel Smith House as seen in April 2019.

- Location within New York Location within the United States
- Location: 117 W. Shore Rd., Huntington, New York
- Area: 1.5 acres (0.61 ha)
- Built: 1830
- Architectural style: Greek Revival
- MPS: Huntington Town MRA
- NRHP reference No.: 85002576
- Added to NRHP: September 26, 1985

Daniel Smith House is a historic home located at Huntington in Suffolk County, New York. It consists of a 2 1/2-story, five-bay, dwelling built about 1855, with a 1 1/2-story three bay south wing, built about 1830. It is an intact example of late period architecture in Huntington.

It was added to the National Register of Historic Places in 1985.
