= William Smith House (Aurora, Colorado) =

Historic house in Colorado, United States

- U.S. National Register of Historic Places
- U.S. Historic district
- Colorado State Register of Historic Properties
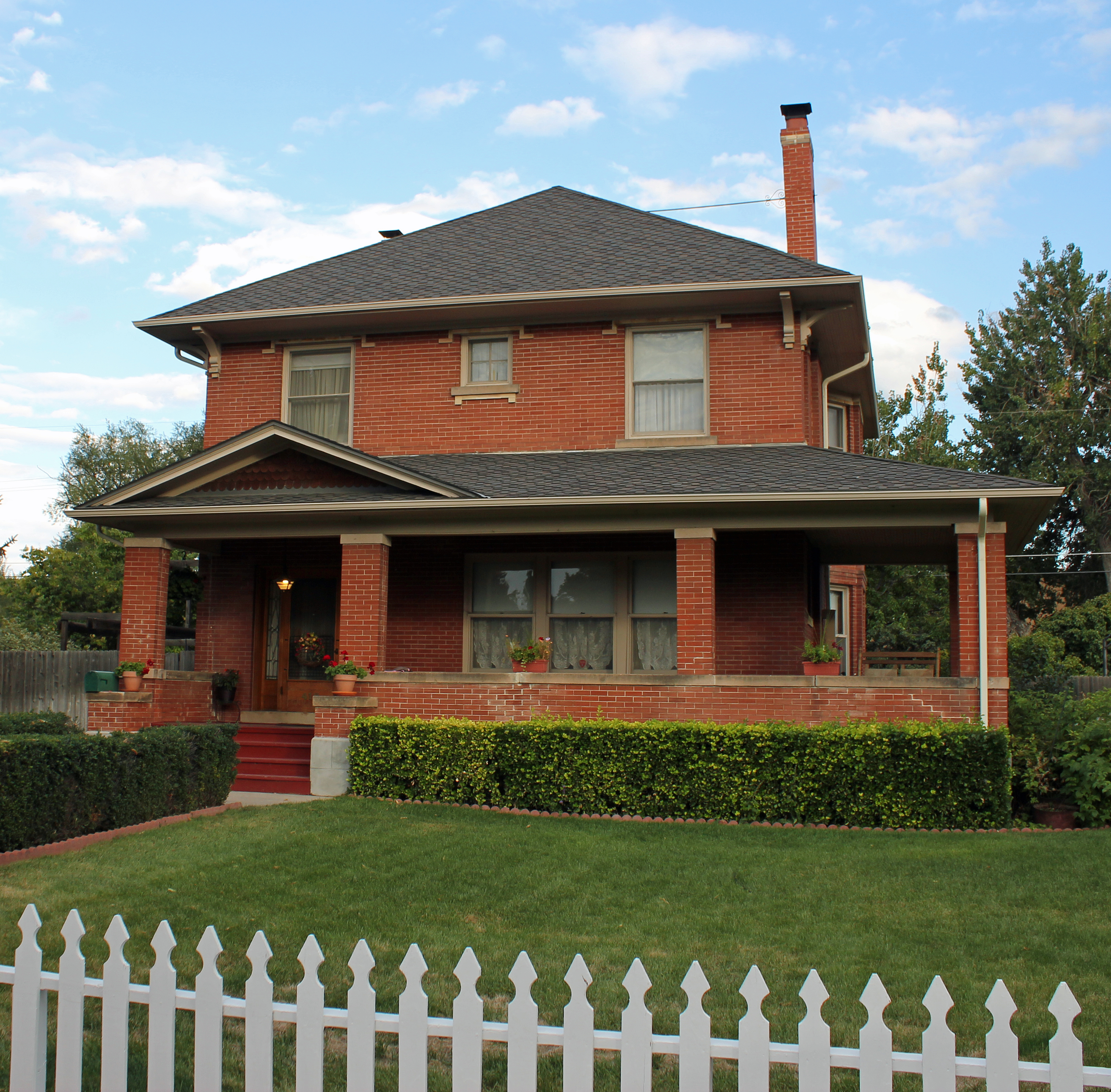

- Location within Colorado Location within the United States
- Nearest city: 412 Oswego Ct., Aurora, Colorado
- Coordinates: 39.7206191°N 104.851048°W
- Area: 0.3 acres (0.12 ha)
- Built: 1910
- Architect: Joseph Wilson
- Architectural style: American Foursquare
- NRHP reference No.: 85002565
- CSRHP No.: 5AH.280
- Added to NRHP: September 26, 1985

The William Smith House is a home located at 412 Oswego Ct. in Aurora, Colorado. William Smith arrived in Aurora, Colorado in 1882. The house was built in 1910. William Smith was the founder of the Aurora Public school system. He once raised sheep on the property and former owner of land donated for Del Mar Park. He served on the school board for over 50 years and Aurora's first high school was named after him. The house remained in the family until 1983 when his daughter Margaret died. The house remains as a private residence.

It was listed on the National Register of Historic Places in 1985.

It has some features of American Foursquare styling in that the body of the house is square in plan, and two stories tall, and has a hipped roof, although it does not have the dormers through its roof that is usually part of the pure style. A second contributing building on the property is a one-car brick garage, built in about 1915 after the house owner purchased a car.

William Smith was born in Aberdeen, Scotland, in 1860.

== See also ==
- National Register of Historic Places listings in Arapahoe County, Colorado
