= Jesse N. Smith House (Parowan, Utah) =

Historic house in Utah, United States

- U.S. National Register of Historic Places
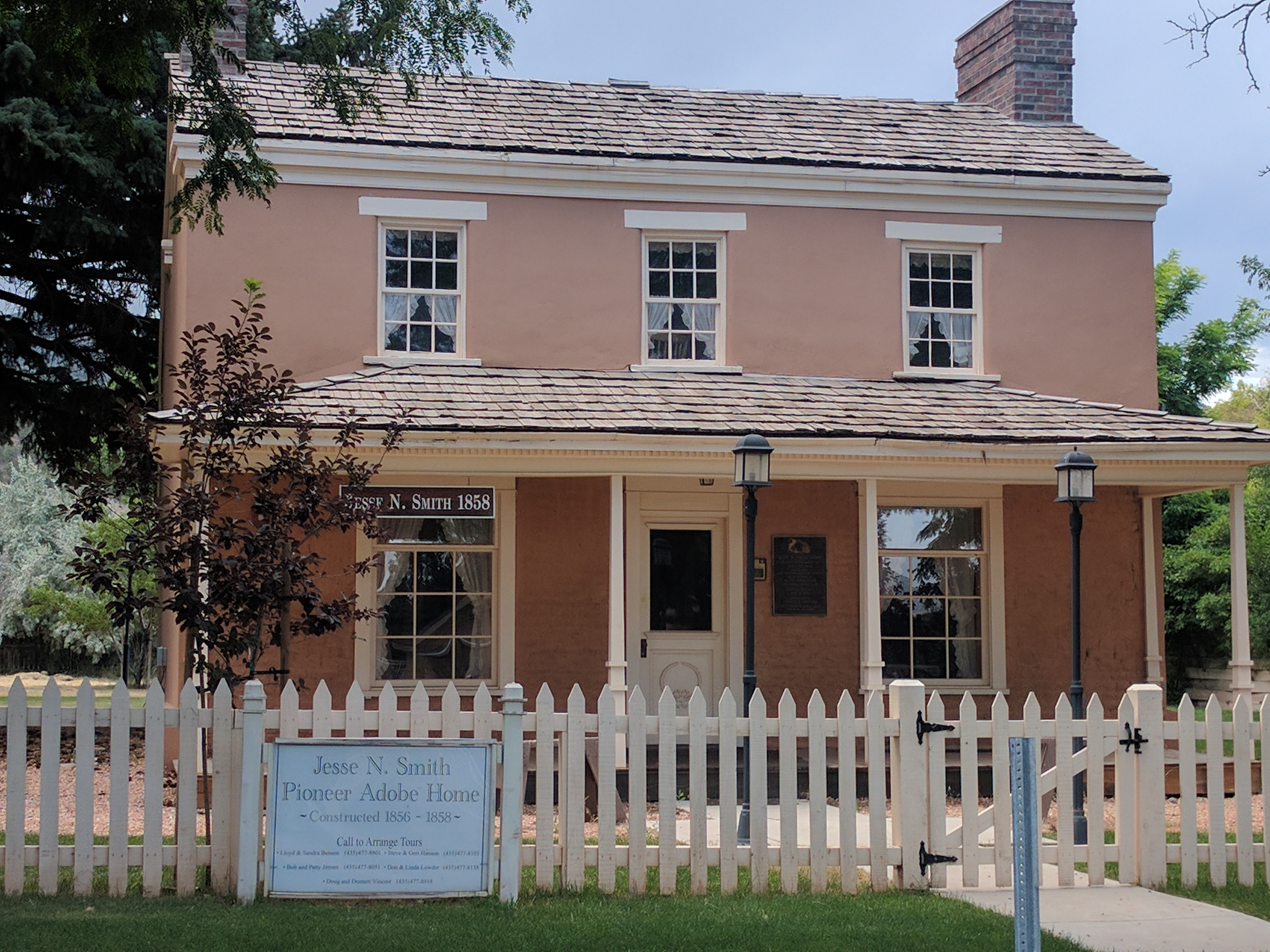

- Location within Utah Location within the United States
- Location: 45 W. 100 South, Parowan, Utah
- Coordinates: 37°50′24″N 112°49′39″W
- Area: less than one acre
- Built: 1856-1858
- Built by: Smith, Jesse N.
- Architectural style: Saltbox
- NRHP reference No.: 75001807
- Added to NRHP: June 20, 1975

The Jesse N. Smith House, located in Parowan, Utah, is a two-story home that was constructed from June 1856 to March 1858. Jesse N. Smith was asked by church leadership to assist in the settling of Parowan in 1851, where he constructed and lived in the house. The house is constructed from quarried rock, baked adobe, and hewed timber. Originally consisting of four rooms - two upstairs and two downstairs - an addition was later added to the rear of the house that consisted of four additional rooms. It is the oldest adobe structure in the state of Utah.

It was listed on the National Register of Historic Places in 1975, and was then thought to be the oldest house surviving in southern Utah.

The house was sold to William Bentley in 1879. The building remained unoccupied for a number of years until it was purchased by the Jesse N. Smith Family Association in 1962. Restoration of the home took place between 1967 and 1969. In 2017, the renovated house exists as a museum for visitors, showcasing the history of Jesse N. Smith and his wives.
