= Simeon Smith Mansion =

Historic house in Vermont, United States

- U.S. National Register of Historic Places
- U.S. Historic district
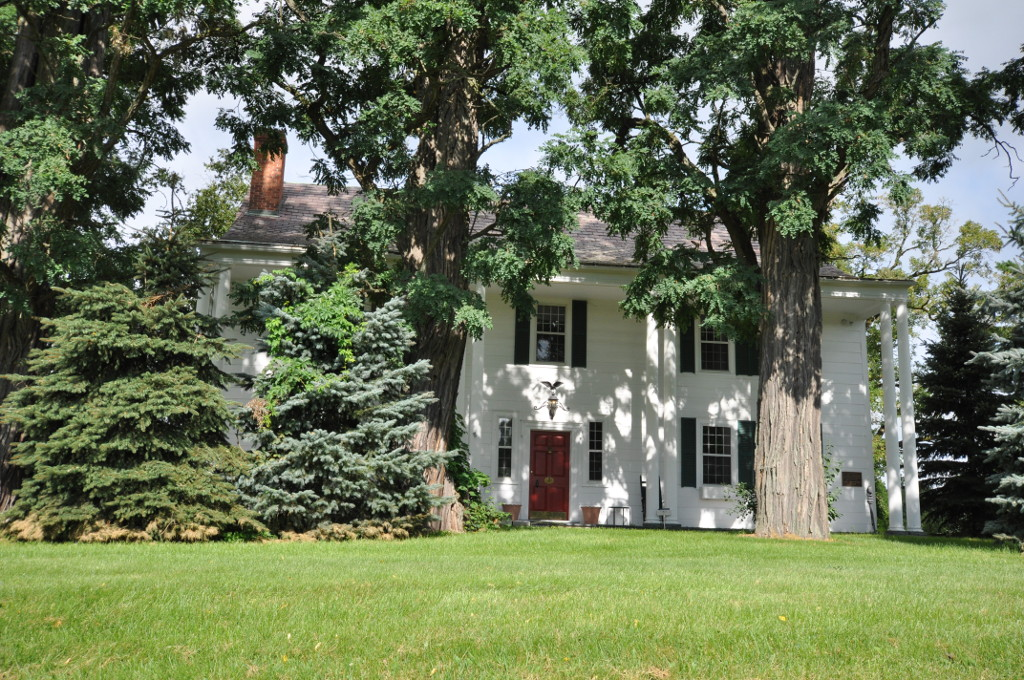

- Location within Vermont Location within the United States
- Location: Smith/Doran Rd. W of jct. with VT 22A, West Haven, Vermont
- Coordinates: 43°38′9″N 73°18′8″W
- Area: 108 acres (44 ha)
- Built: 1876
- Architect: Webber, Payson R.
- Architectural style: Colonial Revival, Georgian
- NRHP reference No.: 91001675
- Added to NRHP: November 21, 1991

The Simeon Smith Mansion is a historic farm property on Smith (or Doran) Road in West Haven, Vermont. The property, more than 100 acres (40 ha) includes a farmhouse dating to the 1790s, which was the seat of Simeon Smith, a prominent local doctor, politician, and landowner. The property was listed on the National Register of Historic Places in 1991.

== Description and history ==
The Simeon Smith Mansion stands in a rural area of eastern West Haven, on the west side of Smith (or Doran) Road, a gravel road extending south from Main Road, a short way west of Vermont Route 22A. The main house is a 2 1/2-story wood-frame structure, with a gable roof, end chimneys, clapboard siding, and a granite foundation. A single-story ell extends to the rear. Across the front stands a monumental two-story Colonial Revival portico, with a shed roof supported by Tuscan columns, some grouped in closely spaced pairs. The facade sheltered by this portico is five bays wide, with a center entrance set in a moulded surround that has narrow sash windows (two panes wide) on either side. The interior follows a traditional Georgian central hall plan, with two rooms on each side of a center hallway. The front rooms exhibit a combination of period 18th-century finishes and alterations made during a major 1937 update of the structure.

The property was purchased in 1789 by Simeon Smith, and the house was probably built not long afterward. Smith had moved to the area in 1783 from northwestern Connecticut. This house was built for him by William Sprat (or Sprats), a Connecticut builder who spent his later years in this area, and is buried in a West Haven cemetery next to Simeon Smith. Smith was a prominent early settler of the area, and made a significant fortune speculating in land, in addition to providing medical services, serving as a local probate judge and in the state legislature.

== See also ==
- Gov. Smith Homestead, built for Smith in Sharon, Connecticut
- National Register of Historic Places listings in Rutland County, Vermont
