= Benjamin Smith House (New Bern, North Carolina) =

Historic house in North Carolina, United States

- U.S. National Register of Historic Places
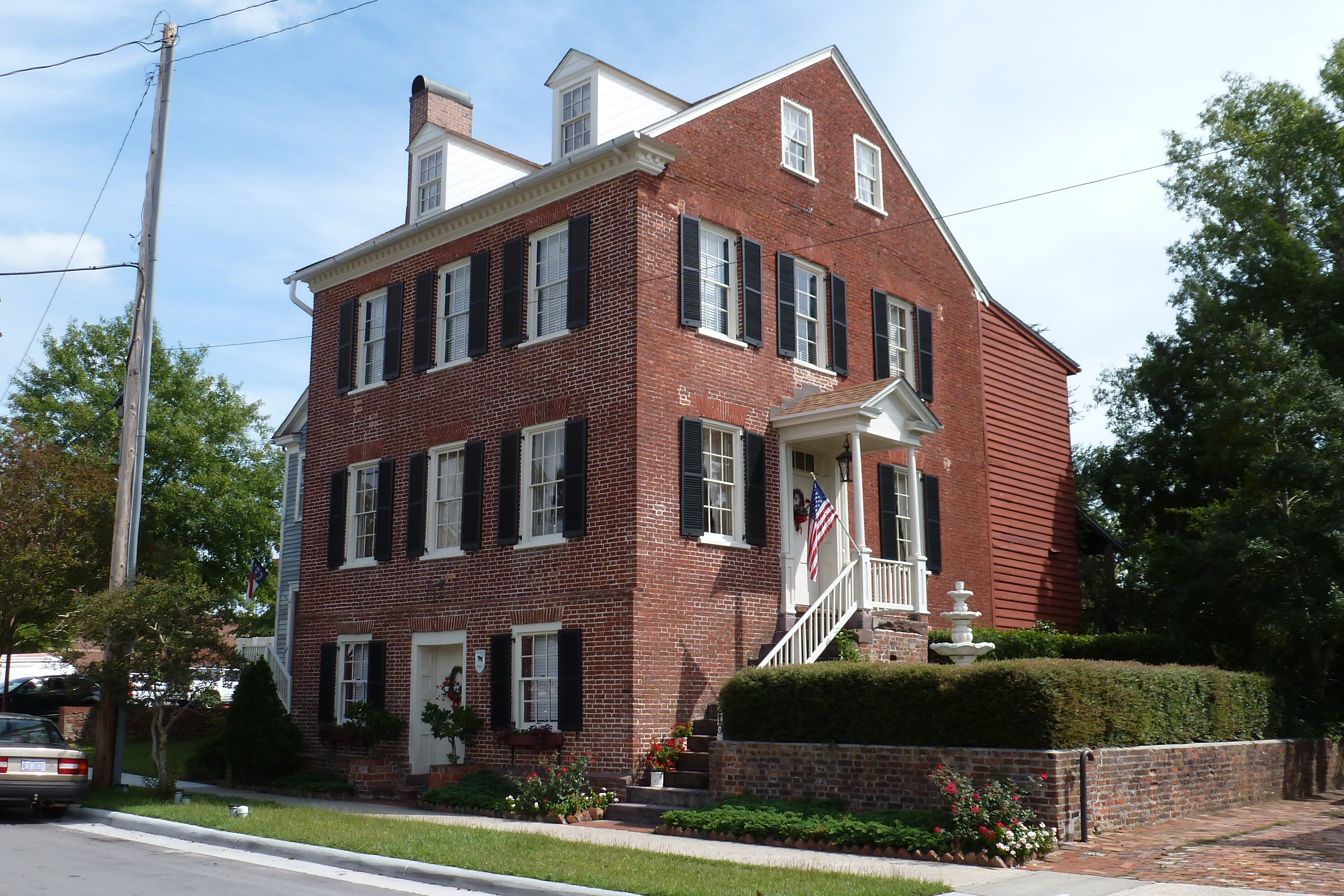

- Location within North Carolina Location within the United States
- Location: 210 Hancock St., New Bern, North Carolina
- Coordinates: 35°6′19″N 77°2′31″W
- Area: 0.3 acres (0.12 ha)
- Built: c. 1790
- Architectural style: Georgian, Federal
- NRHP reference No.: 72000949
- Added to NRHP: April 13, 1972

The Benjamin Smith House is a historic home located at New Bern, Craven County, North Carolina. It was built about 1790, and is a 2 1/2-story, brick side-hall plan dwelling with Georgian and Federal-style design elements.

It was listed on the National Register of Historic Places in 1972.
