= William S. Smith House =

Historic house in Maryland, United States

- U.S. National Register of Historic Places
- Location within Maryland Location within the United States
- Location: S side of Oriole Rd. E of jct. with Crab Island Rd., Oriole, Maryland
- Coordinates: 38°10′22″N 75°48′56″W
- Area: 0.8 acres (0.32 ha)
- Built: 1890
- Architectural style: Queen Anne
- NRHP reference No.: 91000891
- Added to NRHP: July 9, 1991

William S. Smith House, also known as Croswell House and Phoebus House, is a historic home located at Oriole, Somerset County, Maryland. It is a two-story cross-shaped frame Queen Anne house, built about 1890. It features by a pair of three-story entrance towers with pyramidal roofs marked by kicked eaves, wooden finials, and weathervanes.

It was listed on the National Register of Historic Places in 1991.
