= William Smith House (Hamilton, Virginia) =

Historic house in Virginia, United States

- U.S. National Register of Historic Places
- Virginia Landmarks Register
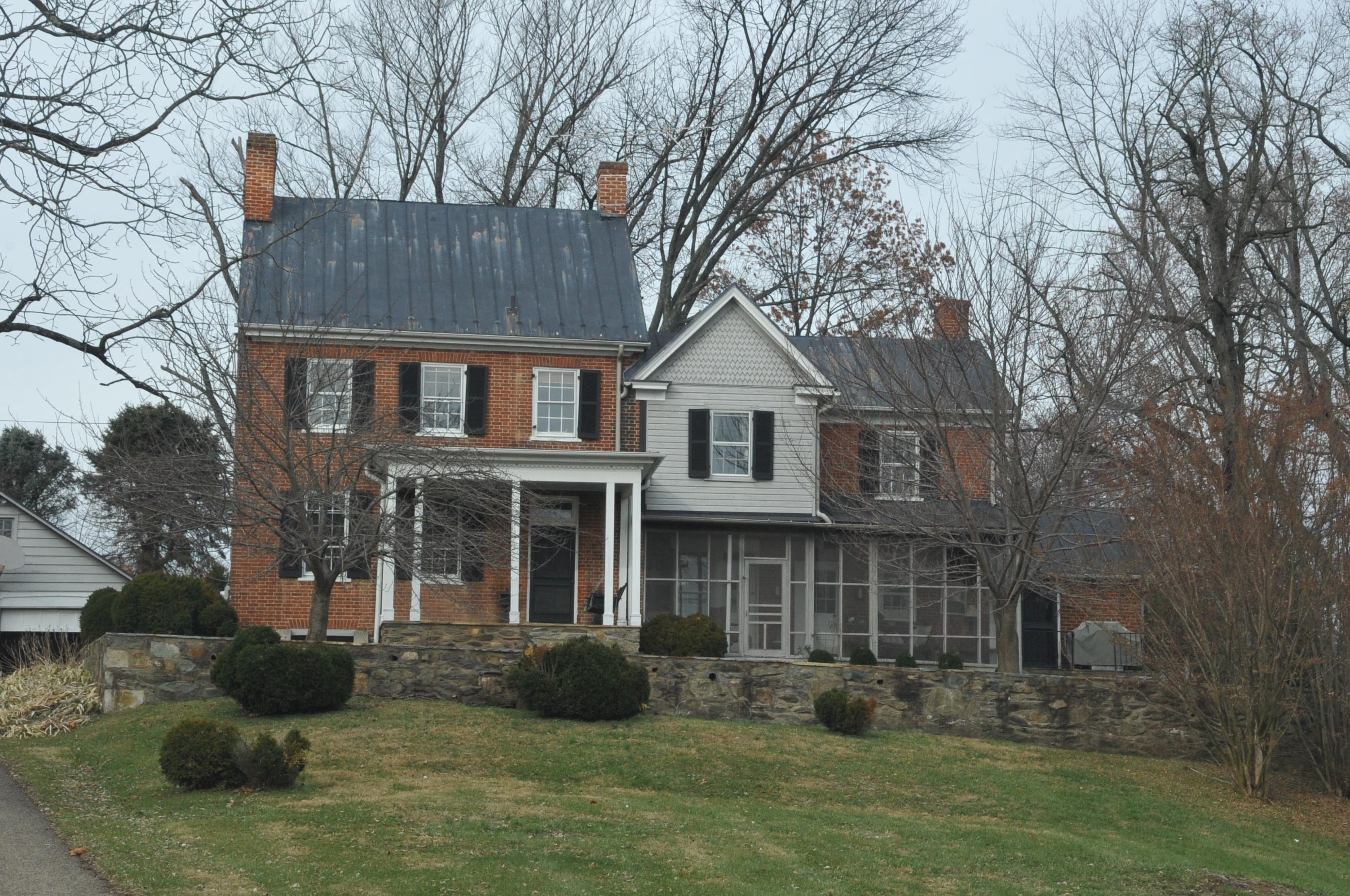

- Location within Northern Virginia Location within Virginia Location within the United States
- Location: 38678 Piggott Bottom Rd., Hamilton, Virginia
- Coordinates: 39°09′29″N 77°39′55″W
- Area: 24.6 acres (10.0 ha)
- Built: c. 1813-1820
- Architectural style: Federal
- NRHP reference No.: 03000189
- VLR No.: 053-1087

Significant dates
- Added to NRHP: April 2, 2003
- Designated VLR: December 4, 2002

William Smith House, also known as Jonas Smith House and Boidock House, is a historic home located at Hamilton, Loudoun County, Virginia. It was built about 1813–1820, and is a two-story, three-bay, Federal-style brick dwelling. It has a recessed right-side dining and kitchen wing, also in brick, originally 1 1/2 stories, now two stories. Also on the property are the contributing brick barn with diamond-patterned ventilation holes (ca 1813), two-story springhouse (c. 1813), a wide loafing shed, a large corncrib, and two-car garage (c. 1948).

It was listed on the National Register of Historic Places in 2003.
