= Henry H. Smith/J.H. Murphy House =

Historic house in Iowa, United States

- U.S. National Register of Historic Places
- Davenport Register of Historic Properties
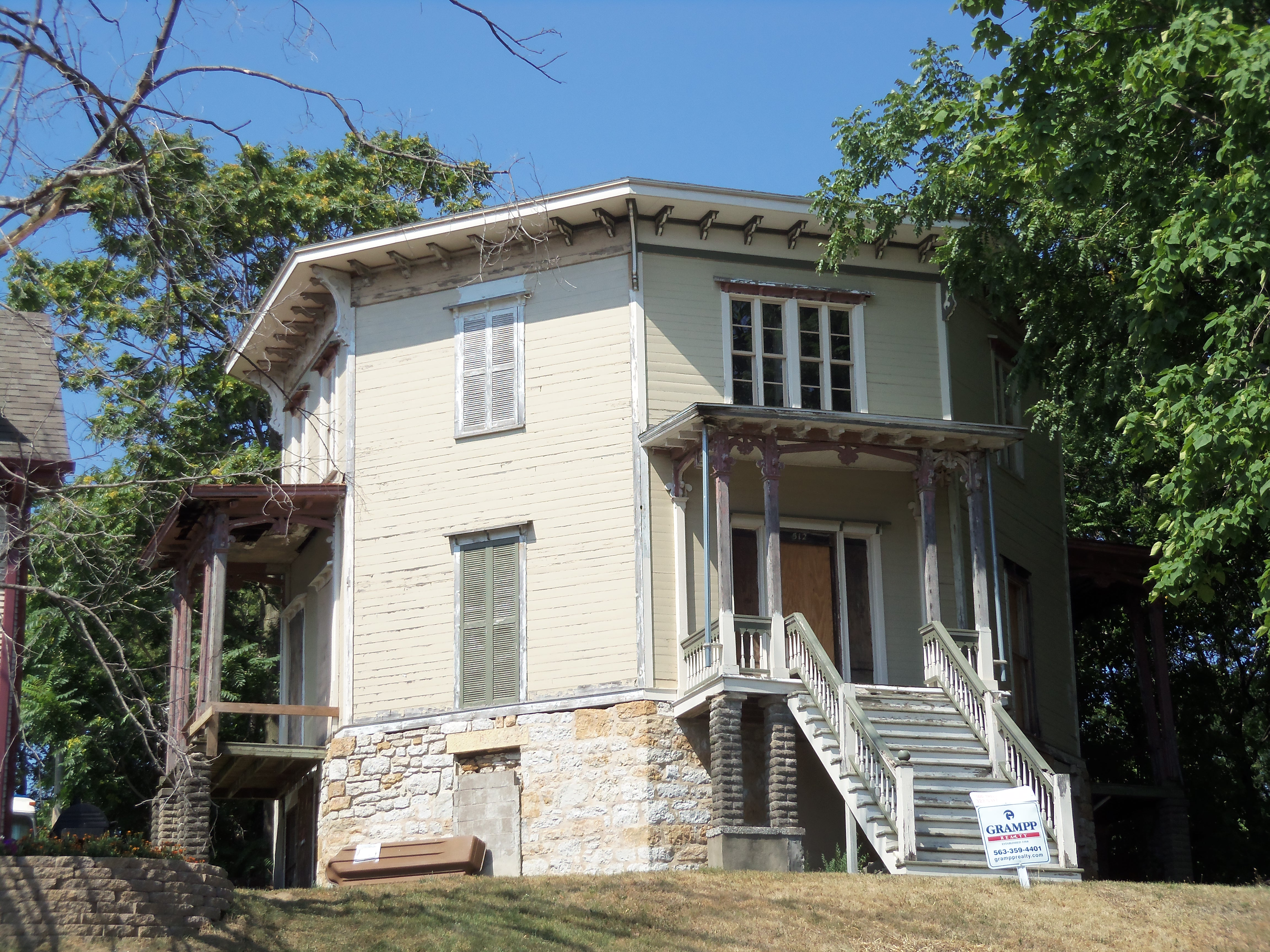

- Location within Iowa Location within the United States
- Location: 512 E. 6th St. Davenport, Iowa
- Coordinates: 41°31′34″N 90°34′3″W
- Area: less than one acre
- Built: 1854
- Architect: Willett L. Carroll
- Architectural style: Italianate
- MPS: Davenport MRA
- NRHP reference No.: 83002508
- DRHP No.: 20

Significant dates
- Added to NRHP: July 7, 1983
- Designated DRHP: April 2, 1997

The Henry H. Smith/J.H. Murphy House is a historic building located on the east side of Davenport, Iowa, United States. It was listed on the National Register of Historic Places in 1983. In 1997 it was listed on the Davenport Register of Historic Properties as the Octagon House.

== History ==
Henry H. "Variety" Smith was a successful Davenport merchant and a member of the city council. He and his wife Mary moved to Davenport in 1850. His downtown store, Smith's Philadelphia Variety Store, was known for its “splendid stock of fancy goods from numerous buying trips to the East.” Mary served as the store's assistant manager and was the city's first female clerk. It is believed he hired one of Davenport's first professional architects, Willett L. Carroll, to design his house in the 1850s.

The Smith's sold the store in 1867 and moved to East Davenport where they were engaged in agriculture. After it sat empty for a short time, the house was purchased by J.H. Murphy who was a partner in the law firm of Martin, Murphy and Suksdorf.

== Architecture ==
The house was designed based on the philosophy of Orson Fowler, a leading phrenologist, who held that the octagon was the closest thing to a circle and it was conducive to good health. While it is one of several octagon houses in the state of Iowa, it is the only one left in Davenport. It is the earliest of the remaining octagon houses in Iowa that was built to the precepts of Fowler who recommended that they employ "plank wall" construction and a plan adapted from the Howland House, which he published in A Home For All in 1853. The house exhibits features found in the Italianate style: hipped roof, bracketed eaves, and a small belvedere on top, which has subsequently been removed. The entrances into the house are on the main floor, which sits atop a raised basement level. They are all covered by columned porches and are located on the four cardinal points of the compass. The grounds of the estate also featured a carriage house, stable, grape vines and a picket fence, all of which are now gone.
