= Simeon Smith House (West Haven, Vermont) =

Historic house in Vermont, United States

- U.S. National Register of Historic Places
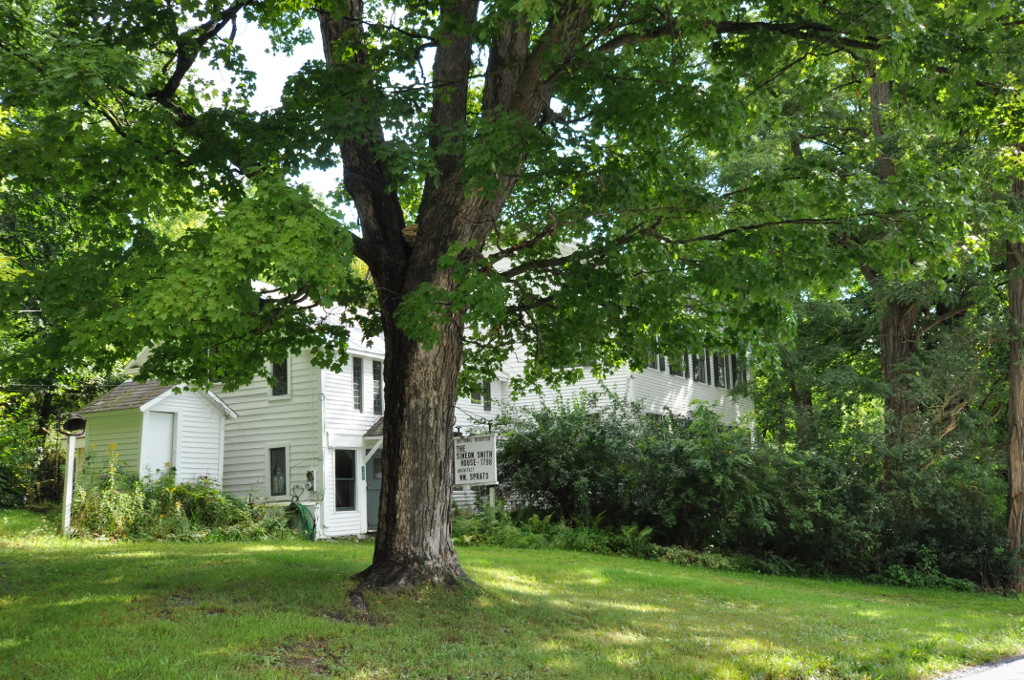

- Location within Vermont Location within the United States
- Location: Main Rd., West Haven, Vermont
- Coordinates: 43°38′11″N 73°18′0″W
- Area: 1 acre (0.40 ha)
- Built: 1798
- Architect: Sprats, William
- Architectural style: Federal
- NRHP reference No.: 83003220
- Added to NRHP: March 3, 1983

The Simeon Smith House is a historic house on Main Road in West Haven, Vermont. Built in 1798–1800 to a design by William Sprat (or Sprats), a prominent housewright from Litchfield, Connecticut, it is a fine example of period Federal architecture. It was built for Simeon Smith, a wealthy businessman who moved here from Connecticut. The house was listed on the National Register of Historic Places in 1983.

== Description and history ==
The Simeon Smith House stands in a rural area of far eastern West Haven, on the north side of Main Road, a short way west of its junction with Vermont Route 22A, the principal north–south route in the area. The house is a 2 1/2-story I-house, built of wood, with a gable roof, clapboard siding, and rubblestone foundation. The main facade faces the road to the south, and has a central entrance flanked by sidelight windows and topped by a cornice. Windows are 19th-century two-over-two sash, with flanking shutters, and the roof line has a modillioned eave. The interior follows a center hall plan on the ground floor, and has a large, elaborately decorated ballroom taking up most of the second floor. An ell extends to the left, dating to a 1920s renovation done after a fire damaged an older ell.

The house was built in 1798-1800 for Simeon Smith, a wealthy businessman who had moved to the area (then part of Fair Haven) in 1787 from northwestern Connecticut. Smith's relationship with the designer William Sprat is not well understood. Sprat was active in the Litchfield, Connecticut area, and was apparently hired by Smith to at least draw up plans for this house; it is unclear if he actually worked on it. Smith and Sprat are buried in adjacent plots in a West Haven Cemetery.

== See also ==
- Gov. Smith Homestead, built for Smith in Sharon, Connecticut
- National Register of Historic Places listings in Rutland County, Vermont
