= Cape Arundel Golf Club =

- U.S. National Register of Historic Places
- U.S. Historic district
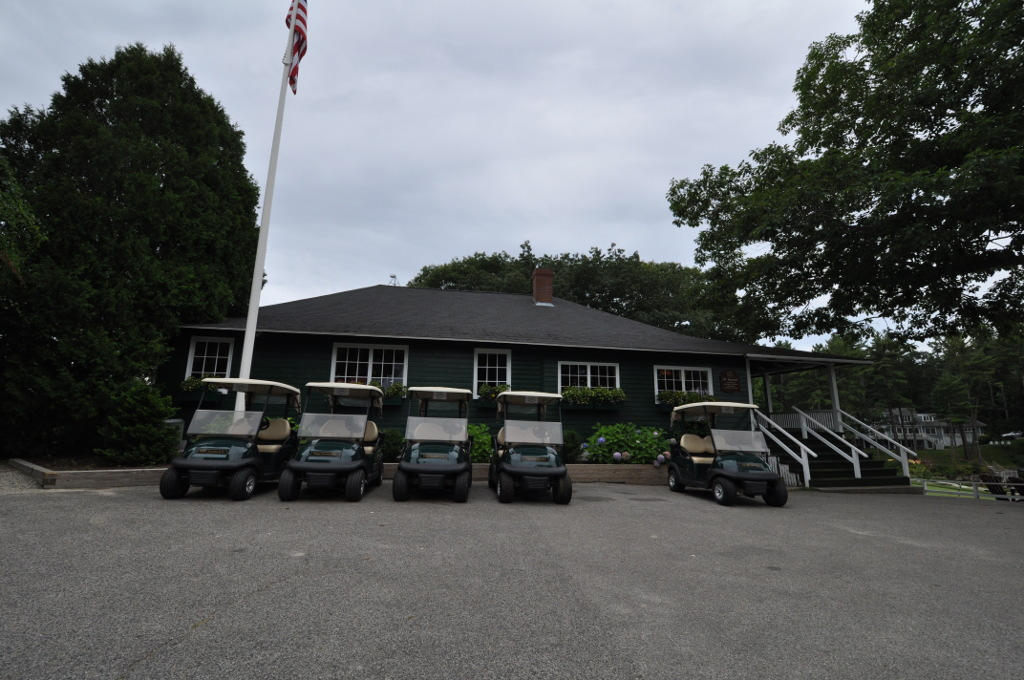

- Location within Maine Location within the United States
- Location: 19 River Rd., Kennebunkport, Maine
- Coordinates: 43.37365°N 70.48068°W
- Area: 88.9 acres (36.0 ha)
- Architect: Travis, Walter J.; Senat, Prosper L.
- Architectural style: Bungalow/craftsman
- NRHP reference No.: 09000879
- Added to NRHP: November 4, 2009

The Cape Arundel Golf Club, originally just the Arundel Golf Club, is a country club at 19 River Road in Kennebunkport, Maine. Established in 1896, it is one of the oldest golf clubs in the state. Its 18-hole course was laid out in two stages, with its original nine holes designed by Alexander H. Findley in 1900, and later redesigned and expanded by Walter Travis. The club has long been a social scene for the summer elite of the Kennebunkport area, notably including former United States President George H. W. Bush. The club was listed on the National Register of Historic Places in 2009.

== Description and history ==
The Cape Arundel Golf Club is located on the north bank of the Kennebunk River on the inland portion of Kennebunkport, abutting the neighboring town of Arundel. It is set on 88 acres (36 ha), between two tidal branches of the river, one of which further branches, partially dividing the property. The property is roughly bisected by the main drive, which provides access to the clubhouse, a Craftsman/Bungalow style building built in 1900 and enlarged about 1920, with an interior last remodeled in the 1980s. The building presents a single story in three directions, but has a two-story frontage overlooking the river, where its site drops off steeply.

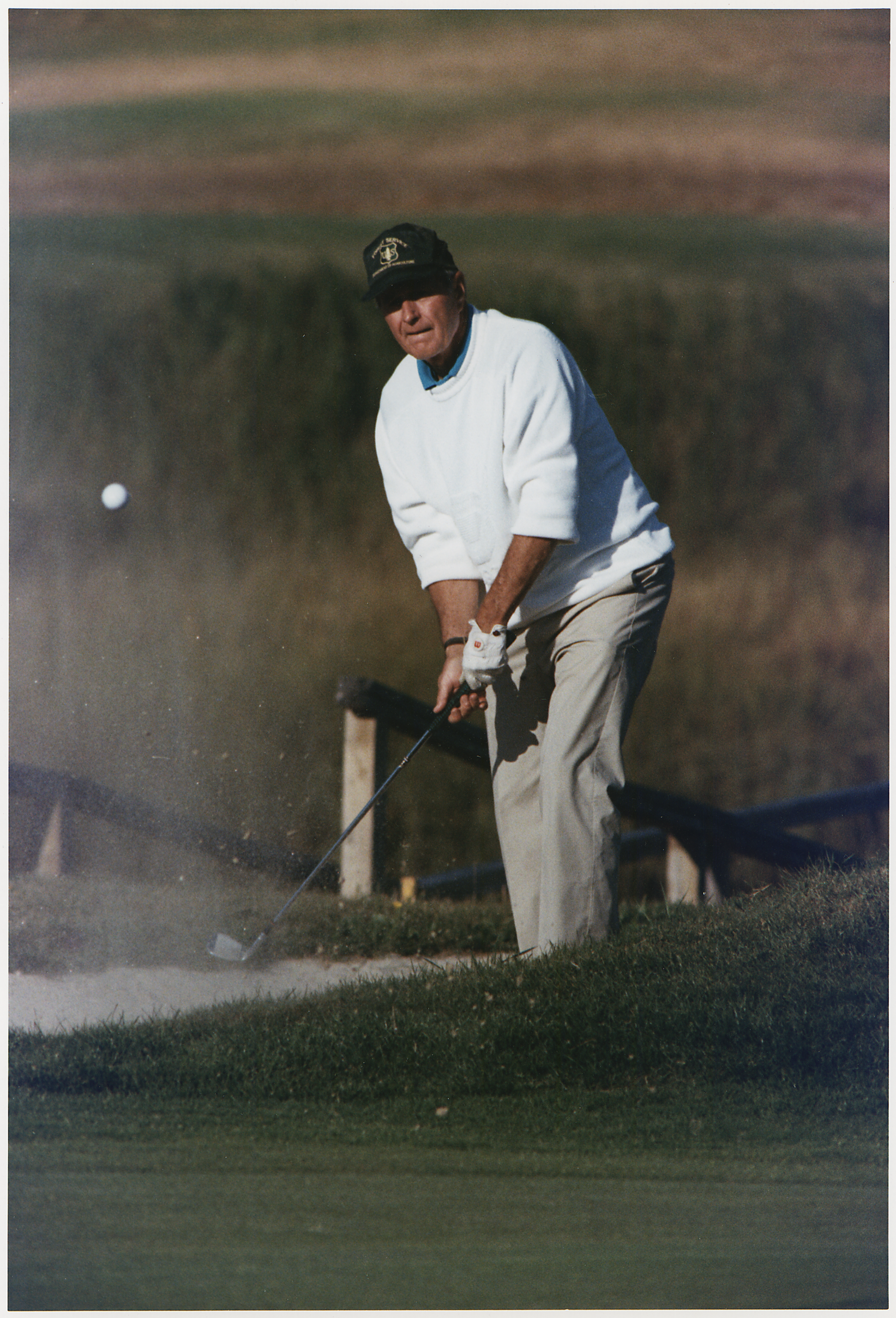
President George H. W. Bush plays on the course.

The club was established in 1896 by the residents of the Cape Arundel Summer Colony, a coastal resort area of lavish summer "cottages" catering to the wealthy. The clubhouse was built in 1900, designed by Prosper L. Senat, and the first nine holes were formally laid out that year. In the early 1920s the club hired Walter Travis to expand the course to eighteen holes. This was accomplished in part by reversing the order of the original nine, which are located east of the access drive, and building the back nine to its west. The course is a modified links-style course, which Travis modeled on traditional Scottish seaside courses. The design involved only limited alteration to the landscape, typically the addition of mounds to the relatively flat terrain. Its greens are small, and are sometimes obscured from view from the fairway, requiring players to plan their shots with care. Play is affected both by wind conditions and the state of the tides along the river.

== See also ==
- National Register of Historic Places listings in York County, Maine
