= Goat Island Light =

Lighthouse in Maine, US

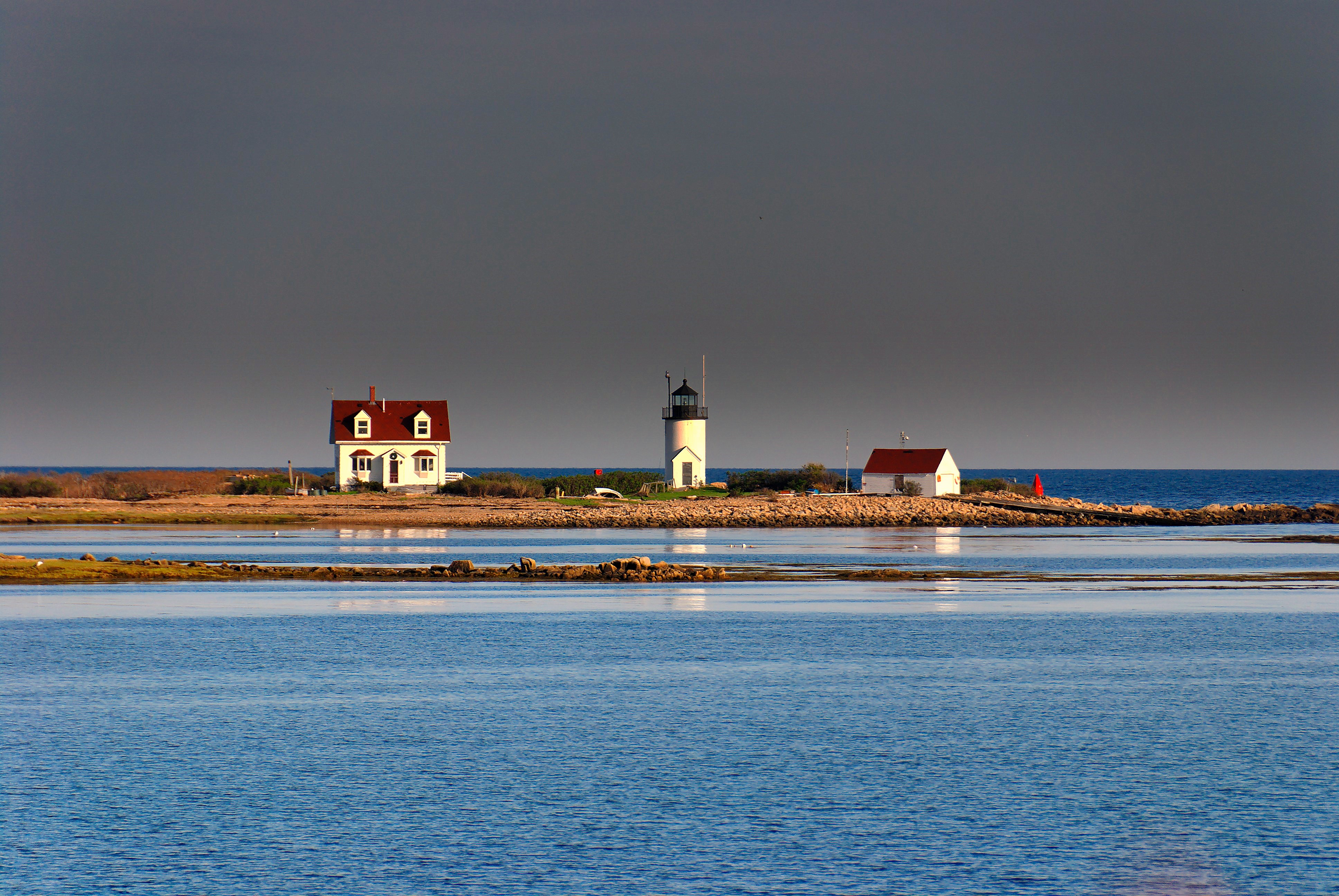
- Goat Island Light from Cape Porpoise
- Location: Goat Island, Cape Porpoise harbor
- Coordinates: 43°21′28″N 70°25′30″W

Tower
- Constructed: 1835
- Foundation: Natural, emplaced
- Construction: Brick
- Automated: 1990
- Height: 7.5 m (25 ft)
- Shape: Cylindrical
- Markings: White with black lantern
- Heritage: National Register of Historic Places listed place
- Fog signal: HORN: 1 every 15s

Light
- First lit: 1859 (current tower)
- Focal height: 38 feet (12 m)
- Lens: 5th order Fresnel lens (original), 12 inches (300 mm) (current)
- Range: 12 nautical miles (22 km; 14 mi)
- Characteristic: Flashing white 6s.
- Goat Island Light Station
- U.S. National Register of Historic Places
- U.S. Historic district
- Nearest city: Cape Porpoise, Maine
- Built: 1859
- Architect: US Army Corps of Engineers
- MPS: Light Stations of Maine MPS
- NRHP reference No.: 87002268
- Added to NRHP: March 23, 1988

Goat Island Light is a lighthouse located off Cape Porpoise near Kennebunkport in southern Maine. Goat Island Light was established in 1835 to guard the entrance to Cape Porpoise Harbor. The original station was upgraded in 1859 to the current brick tower with a fifth order Fresnel lens. Keeper's quarters were added to the island in 1860. The light station was automated by the United States Coast Guard in 1990 and is currently active. The keepers dwellings and tower are leased to the Kennebunkport Conservation Trust. Goat Island Light can be seen from shore in Cape Porpoise Harbor just off State Route 9 north of Kennebunkport or is viewable by boat. The island is currently closed to the public except by special arrangement.

== Description and history ==
The coast of southern Maine east of the Kennebunk River is studded with a group of small islands and rock ledges near the headland called Cape Porpoise. Goat Island is a treeless outer island, about 7.7 acres (3.1 ha) in size. The lighthouse is set on the island's southern shore, with the keeper's house a short way to its north. A boathouse and dock stand and the western end of the island, with a small brick oil house between it and the tower.

The present tower is a circular brick structure, with the lantern 25 feet (7.6 m) above ground level. The lantern house presently houses a fifth order Fresnel lens. A metal walkway and railing surround the lantern house, and there is a single window in the tower. A small workroom with two doors projects from the tower. The keeper's house is an L-shaped wood-frame structure, 1 1/2 stories in height, with clapboard siding replacing its original board-and-batten siding. The roof is pierced by dormers, also a later alteration. It was originally joined to the tower by a covered walkway. The boathouse is a simple rectangular single-story structure with a gable roof and clapboard siding. The oil house is a small brick structure with a gable roof that has a vent at one end.

Goat Island Light was authorized in 1833 as an aid to navigation for reaching the harbor at Cape Porpoise. The first tower built was 20 feet (6.1 m) in height; the present tower and keeper's house were built in 1859. The boathouse was built in 1905.

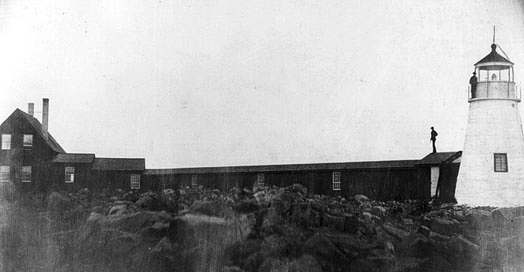
Original 1835 tower, USCG photo

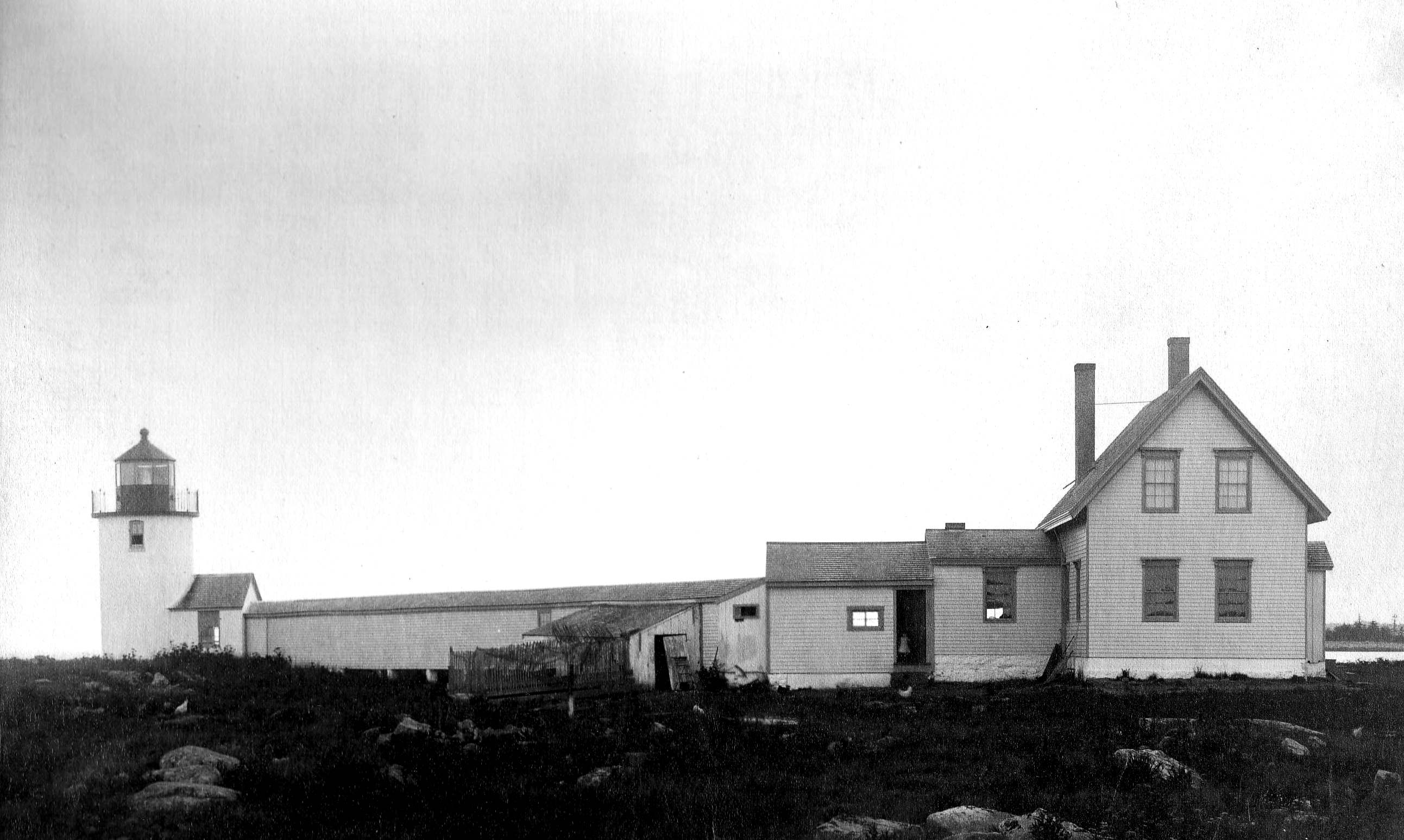
1859 tower, USCG photo

== See also ==
- National Register of Historic Places listings in York County, Maine
