= Kennebunk River Club =

- U.S. National Register of Historic Places
- U.S. Historic district – Contributing property
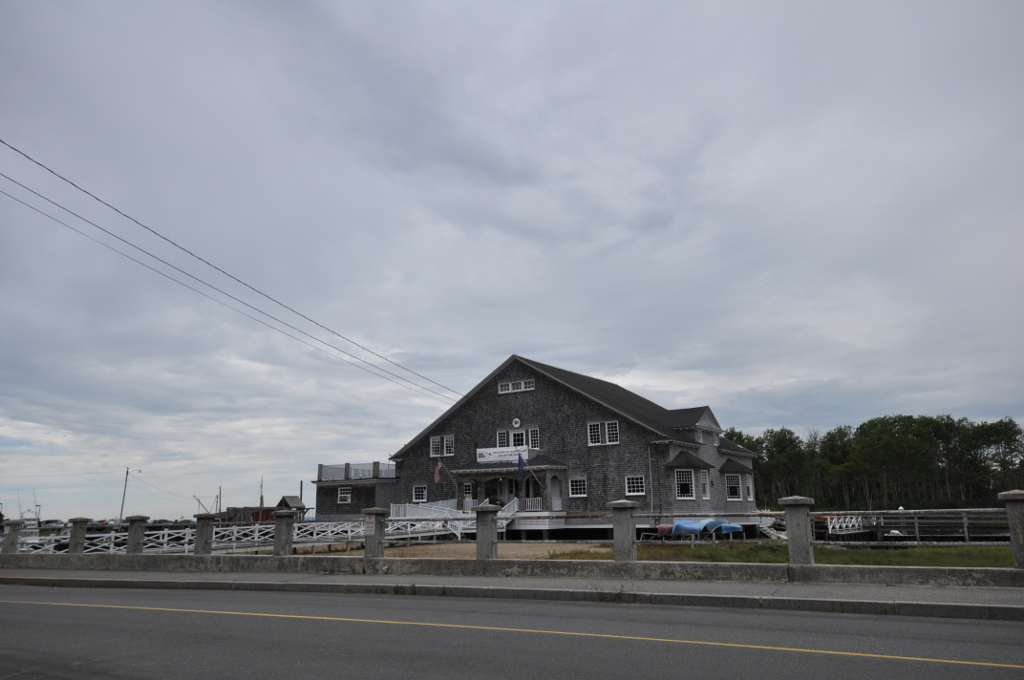

- Location within Maine Location within the United States
- Location: 116 Ocean Avenue, Kennebunkport, Maine
- Coordinates: 43°21′1″N 70°28′24″W
- Area: 1 acre (0.40 ha)
- Built: 1888
- Architect: Frederick W. Stickney
- Architectural style: Shingle Style
- Part of: Cape Arundel Summer Colony Historic District (ID84001549)
- NRHP reference No.: 75002169

Significant dates
- Added to NRHP: September 9, 1975
- Designated CP: August 16, 1984

The Kennebunk River Club is a private recreational and social club at 116 Ocean Avenue in Kennebunkport, Maine. Established in 1888 by summer residents of the resort area, its main building, constructed the following year, is a high-quality example of Shingle style architecture, and was listed on the National Register of Historic Places in 1975.

== Description and history ==
The Kennebunk River Club is located on the west side of Ocean Avenue, between it and the Kennebunk River. It is a two-story frame structure, built on top of pilings. It has a broad gabled roof oriented toward the river and the road, with gabled dormers projecting from the sides. The main facade faces the river, and has a centered double-door entrance flanked by sidelights, with symmetrically placed windows on either side. A porch extends across this facade, with five arched openings on the first floor, and a large arched opening on the second. Stairs sheltered by the porch provide access between its levels. The interior of the building is simply styled, and little altered since its construction.

In 1888, thirteen summer residents of Kennebunkport organized a "Lobster, Boat, and Canoe Club", which was formally titled the Kennebunk River Club with the start of construction of this building the following year. The building, designed by Frederick W. Stickney of Lowell, Massachusetts, was completed in 1890, and was enlarged by the addition of a canoe shed on the north side in 1908. Canoes were built and hired out to club members by members of the Penobscot tribe who came to Kennebunkport from Old Town each summer. The club's activities have mirrored changing fashions of boating trends over the following decades.

== See also ==
- National Register of Historic Places listings in York County, Maine
