= Mathew Lanigan =

American businessman

- Born: April 10, 1964; San Juan, Puerto Rico
- Died: November 27, 2012 (aged 48); Worcester, Massachusetts, U.S.

Mathew James Lanigan (April 10, 1964 – November 27, 2012) was an American businessman and selectman from Kennebunkport, Maine. A supporter of the town's annual Christmas Prelude, the 2012 edition of the event was dedicated in his honor, and the bridge connecting Kennebunkport and Kennebunk is now named for him.

Lanigan was also a member of the Kennebunkport Business Association.

== Life and career ==
The Kennebunk side of the Mathew J. Lanigan Bridge

Lanigan formerly owned this store in Dock Square

Lanigan was born in 1964 in San Juan, Puerto Rico, to Donald and Margaret Hanna. He graduated Sarasota High School and the University of Central Florida, earning his bachelor's degree.

After several years as concierge manager at Disney's Grand Floridian Resort & Spa in Orlando, Florida, he later became the owner of The Emporium, a store in Kennebunkport's Dock Square, for seventeen years. The business was named one of the top 100 retailers of the world by Swarovski.

He served on Kennebunkport's board of selectmen for eight years, including as its chair between 2007 and 2009.

Beginning in 1986, he volunteered to decorate the town for its annual Christmas Prelude, including stringing the lights on the tree, and the bridge separating Kennebunkport from neighboring Kennebunk. The bridge was named in his honor upon his death.

== Death ==
Lanigan died in 2012, aged 48, from complications from brain surgery performed eight days earlier. He was survived by his wife of ten years, Jennifer Lufkin, and three children.
