= Cape Arundel Summer Colony Historic District =

Historic district in Maine, United States

Coordinates: 43.3434°N 70.4687°W

- U.S. National Register of Historic Places
- U.S. Historic district
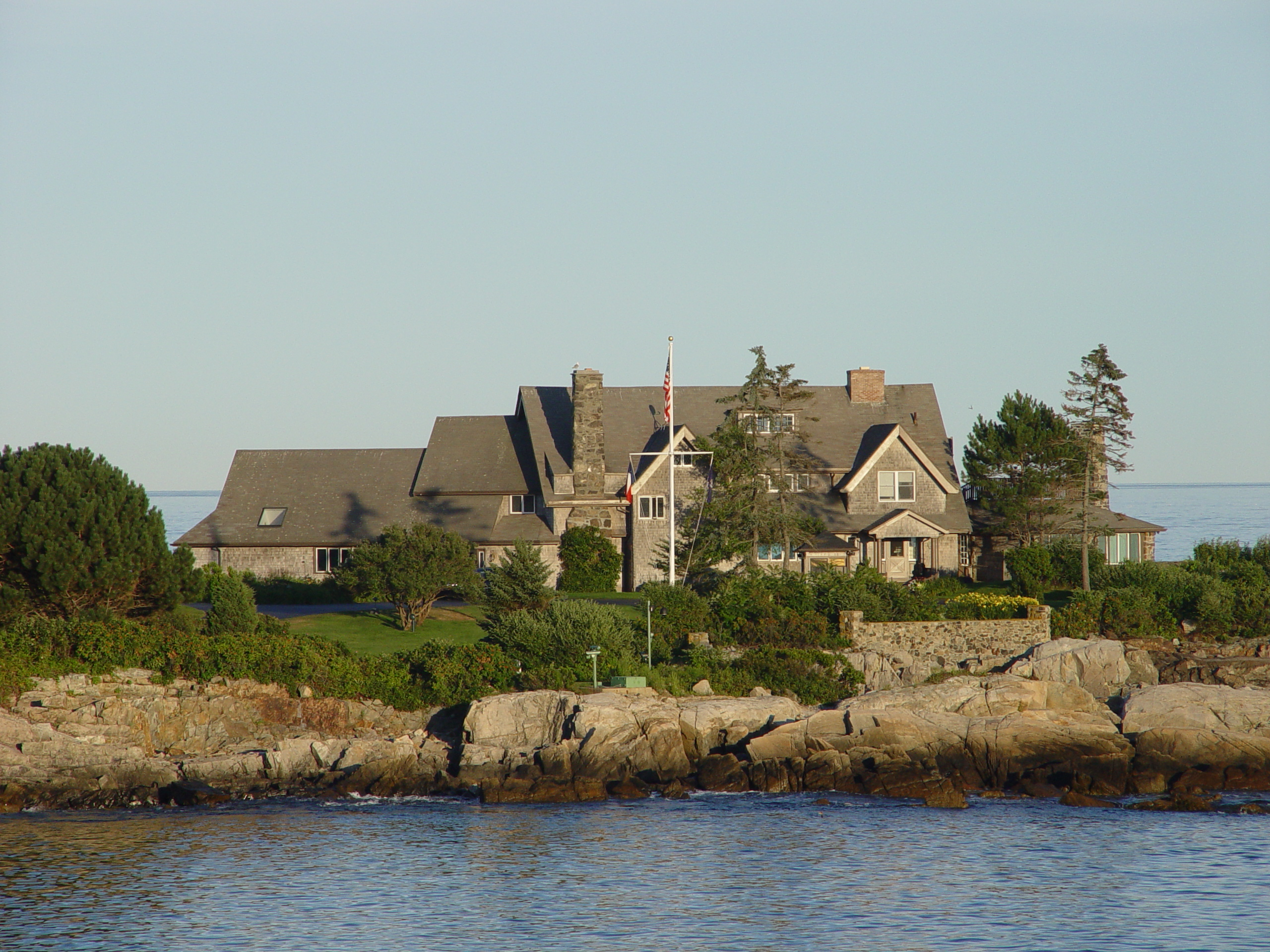
- The residence of former United States President George H. W. Bush, the main house of the Bush compound at Walkers Point

- Location within Maine Location within the United States
- Location: Roughly bounded by Chick's Creek, Ocean Ave., S. Main St., Endcliff Rd., and Walkers Point, Kennebunkport, Maine
- Area: 120 acres (49 ha)
- Architect: Multiple
- Architectural style: Colonial Revival, Shingle Style
- NRHP reference No.: 84001549
- Added to NRHP: August 16, 1984

The Cape Arundel Summer Colony Historic District encompasses an enclave of large summer estates on the coast of Kennebunkport, Maine. The area was developed in the late 19th and early 20th century as a resort area for the wealthy of the northeastern United States. It notably includes the Kennebunk River Club and Walkers Point, the location of the Bush compound, which has a Shingle-style house built in 1903. The district was listed on the National Register of Historic Places in 1984.

== Description and history ==
Cape Arundel is located on the southern coast of Maine, just east of the mouth of the Kennebunk River. The village center of Kennebunkport is set a short way up the river. Development of this area as a summer resort began in the 1870s with the formation of the Sea Shore Company, which purchased most of the land in the area, and promoted its development. The company built the Ocean Bluff Hotel in 1873, but development did not take off until a railroad spur was completed the following year. More hotels were built, with summer "cottages" following as road access to the area was improved. The Kennebunk River Club was built in 1889 as a major social venue.

A significant number of the buildings in the district were designed by prominent architects of the day, and many were executed in the Shingle style of architecture popular for summer houses in the late 19th century. John Calvin Stevens, a noted Portland architect, designed several buildings, as did William Ralph Emerson and Henry Paston Clark. Clark and his partners in particular designed at least 29 houses in the area.

Many of these properties line Ocean Avenue, extending along the southernmost stretch of the Kennebunk River, and around the cape to just east of Walkers Point, which juts south into the sea. Most of these are on the inland side of the road, with the Bush compound, which is located on Walkers Point. This property was sold to George Herbert Walker by the Sea Shore Company in 1902, and had two Shingle style houses built the following year. One has since been demolished; the other now serves as the summer home of former United States President George H. W. Bush.

== Gallery ==
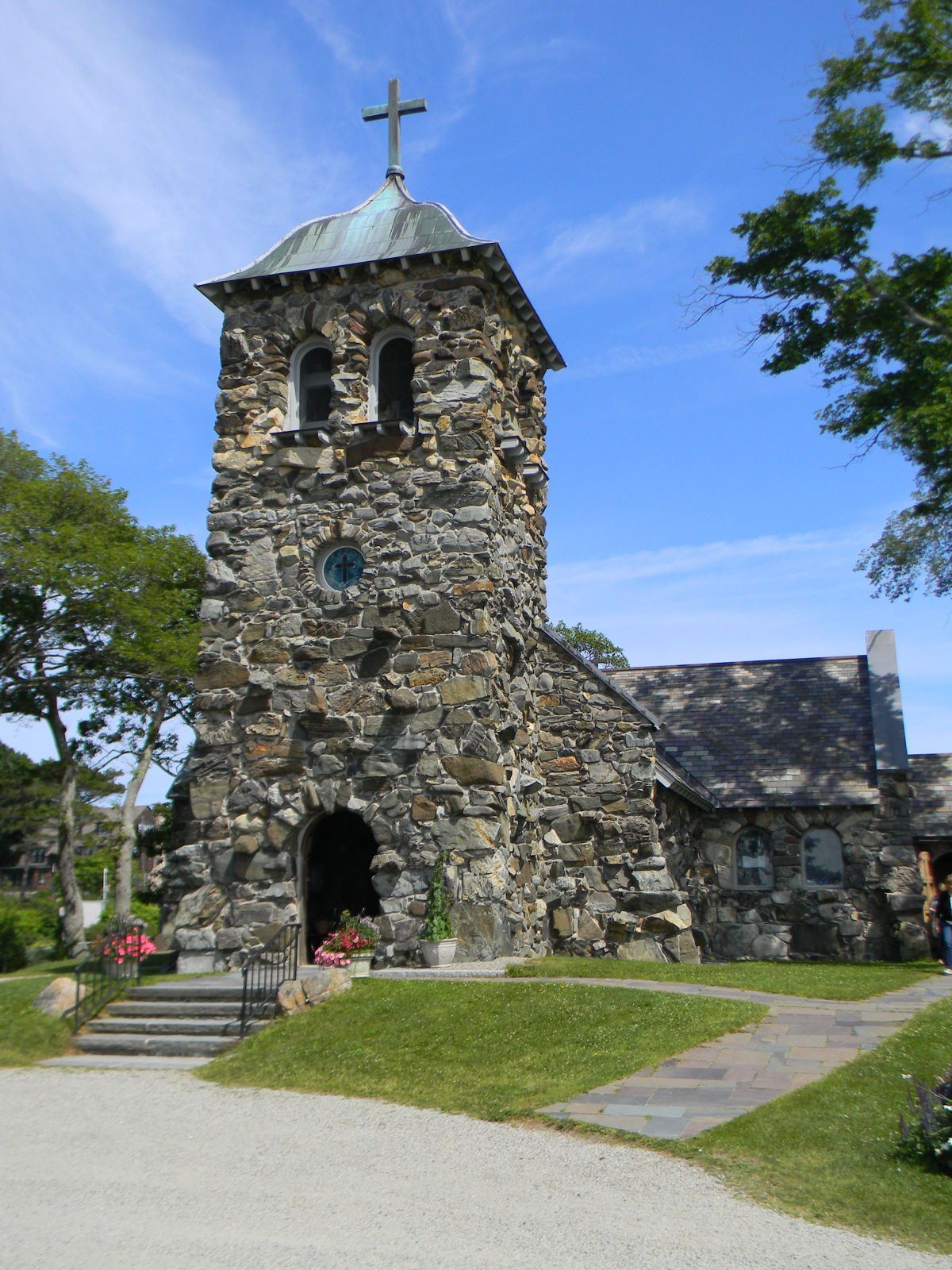
Cape St. Ann's Episcopal Church, 2015

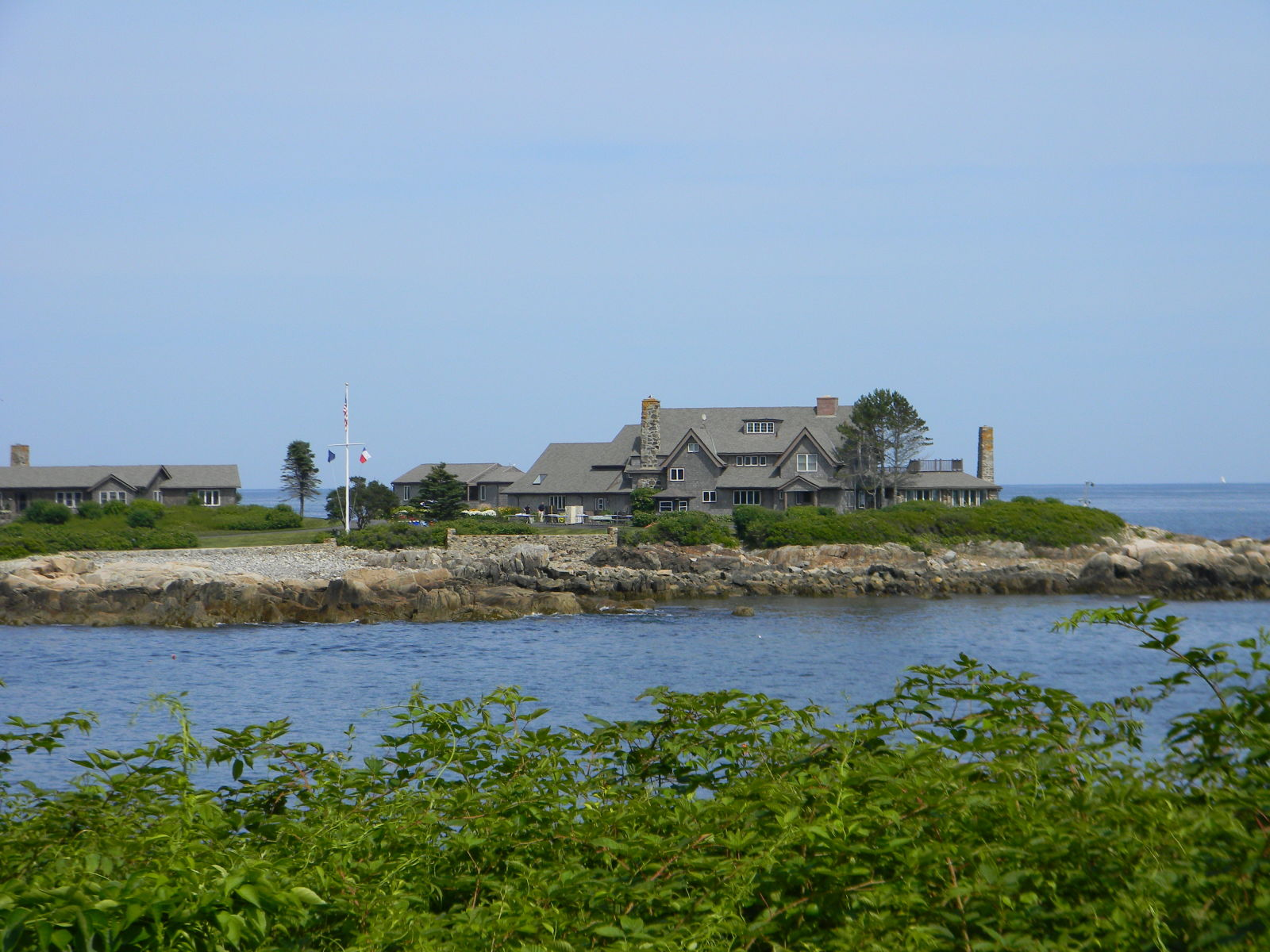
Walker's Point, 2015

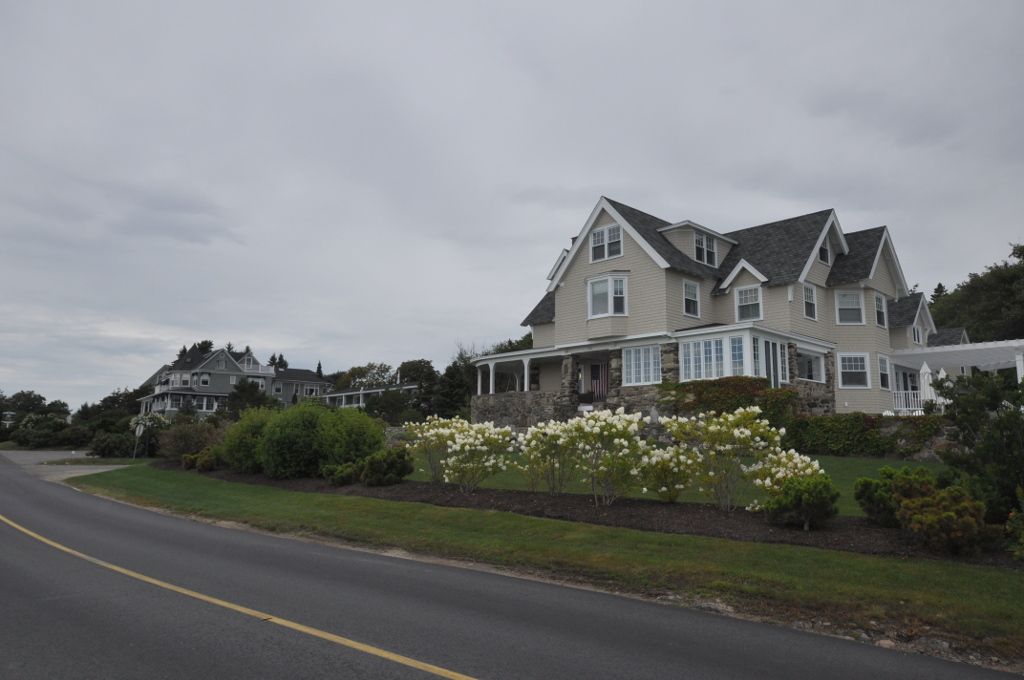
Summer home on Ocean Avenue

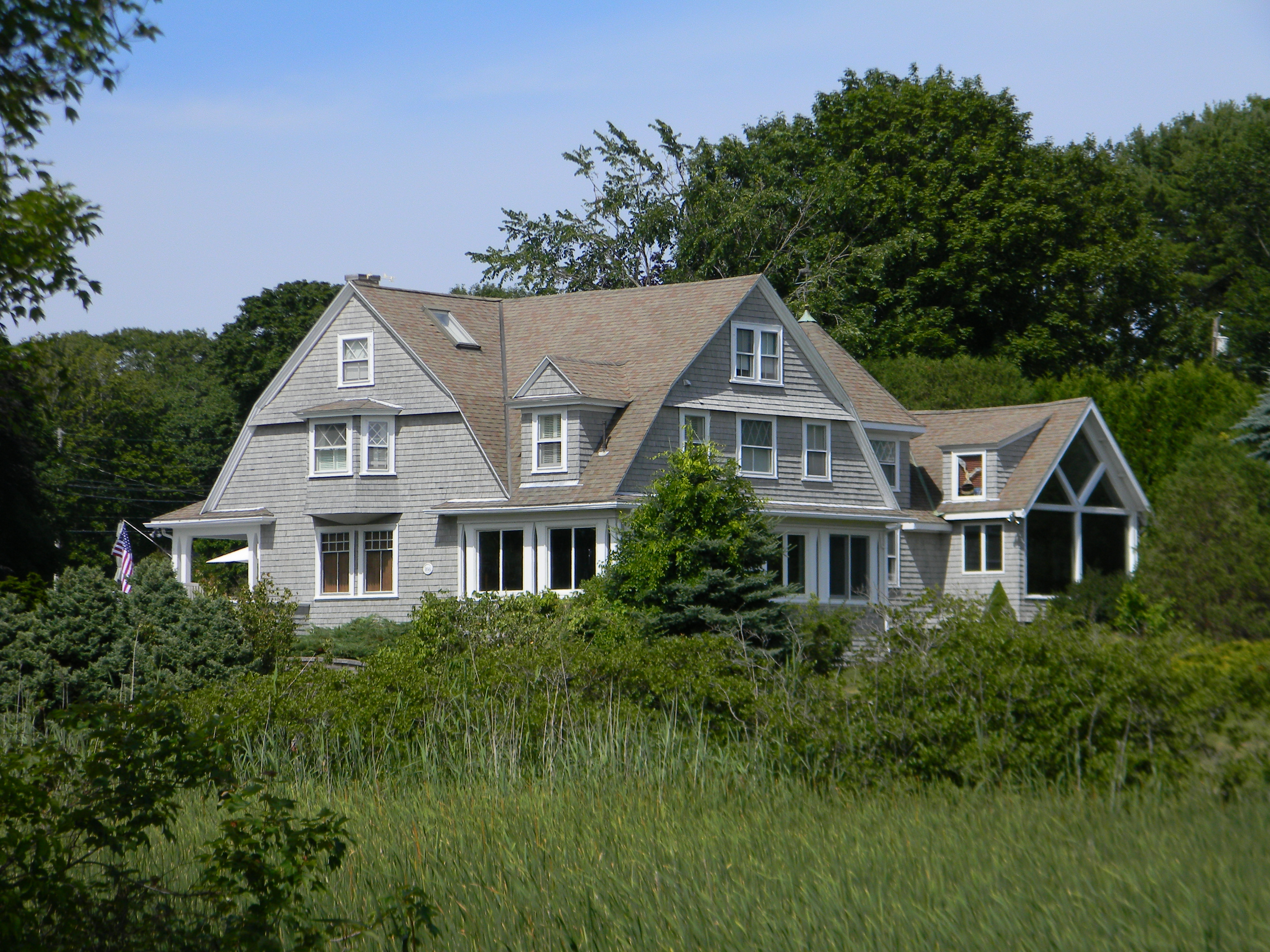

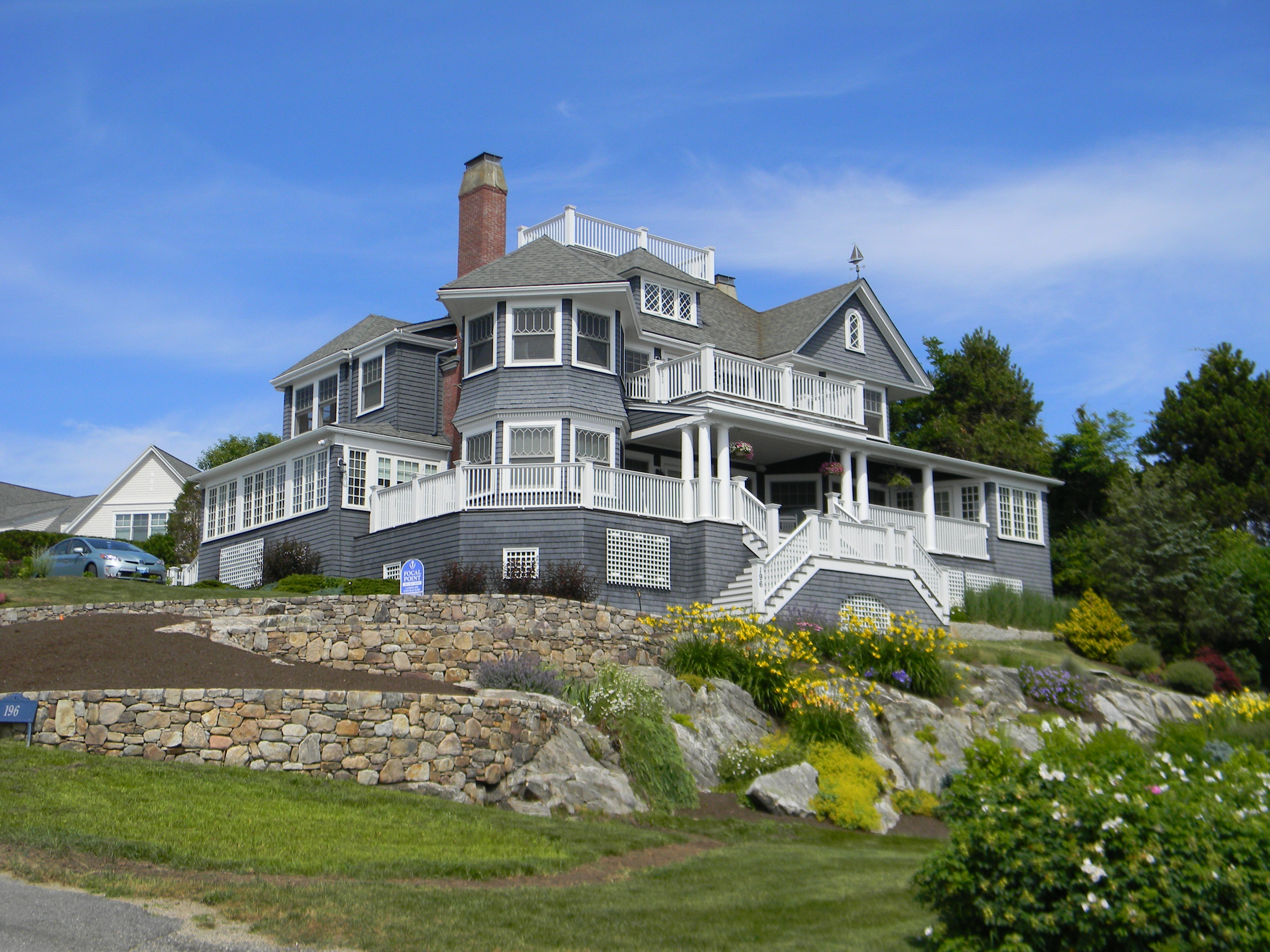

== See also ==
- National Register of Historic Places listings in York County, Maine
