= Frank Handlen =

American painter (1916–2023)

- Born: Frank William Handlen; September 26, 1916; New York City, New York, U.S.
- Died: May 25, 2023 (aged 106); Biddeford, Maine, U.S.
- Occupations: Painter; sculptor; shipwright
- Known for: Marine based portraits
- Children: 2

Frank William Handlen (September 26, 1916 – May 25, 2023) was an American painter, sculptor and shipwright, known for his marine-based portraits.

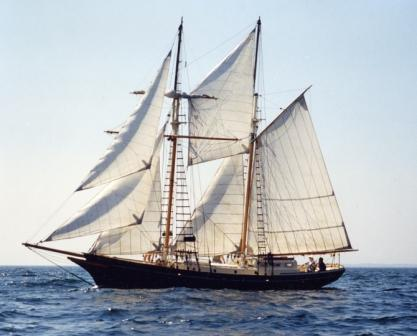
Saltwind, by Frank W. Handlen

The offshore swell

== Biography ==
Born in Brooklyn in 1916, and raised in Caldwell, New Jersey, Handlen depicts ships, the sea and the Maine landscape in oil and pastels. In 1938, his mentor, marine artist Frederick Judd Waugh, encouraged him to go to Maine, "where it will all be before you". Handlen settled first in Biddeford Pool and later in Kennebunkport. As a young man, he worked in Bernie Warner's shipyard on the Kennebunk River and eventually designed and built his own forty-foot, sixteen ton topsail schooner, The Saltwind, which is moored in the Kennebunk River behind his house, very near the site of the old shipyard. In 1994, he was commissioned to create the heroic bronze statue, Our Forebears of the Coast, which stands on the Kennebunkport River Green.

Handlen was a Fellow of The American Society of Marine Artists for 22 years. He illustrated "Seapiece The Story of a Maine Boy" by Will Beale and "The Story of Maine for Young Readers" by Melville Freeman and Estelle Hale Perry. His pastels, oil paintings and pen and ink drawings are extensively owned by private and corporate collectors including The Kennebunkport Historical Society, The Brick Store Museum, MBNA, Sears Roebuck and The St. Botolph Club in Boston. He turned 100 in September 2016, and 105 in 2021.

Handlen died in Biddeford, Maine, on May 25, 2023, at the age of 106.
