= Eliot O'Hara =

American painter

- O'Hara in 1954
- Born: June 14, 1890; Waltham, Massachusetts
- Died: July 30, 1969 (aged 79); Washington D.C.
- Known for: Watercolor painting
- Awards: Guggenheim Fellowship, 1928

Eliot O'Hara (June 14, 1890 – July 30, 1969) was an American artist and educator known for his masterful watercolors, especially his impressionistic landscapes. The Ogunquit Museum of American Art in Maine has over 120 of his watercolors, representing all aspects of his work. His paintings are in the collections of many American museums, and have been the subject of exhibitions throughout the US. He was an influential educator through his nearly 40 years of teaching, writing, and filmmaking.

== Life ==
Eliot O'Hara was born in 1890, in Waltham, Massachusetts to Daniel and Mayfred O'Hara. His father was the owner of the O'Hara Waltham Dial Company and Eliot went into the family business. In 1923 he began teaching himself to paint with watercolors while continuing to work at the family factory. In 1927, O'Hara took a few courses at the Boston Museum School and at the School of Fine arts and Crafts in Boston and then, in 1928, he was awarded a Guggenheim fellowship in painting.

Moscow Church, 1929

In 1929 O'Hara undertook an epic journey through Soviet Russia. Traveling by train, horseback and foot, he produced 130 sketches and watercolors that he later completed at a studio in Paris. The paintings were exhibited in the Soviet Union and at galleries in London, Boston, and New York. A selection of the paintings toured throughout the United States. He remained an avid traveler and plein air painter throughout his life, locations for his paintings include Peru, Australia, Japan, China, Indonesia, and Thailand.

In 1931, he opened the Eliot O'Hara School for Watercolor Painting in Goose Rocks Beach, Maine. The school was active until it burned down in the Great Fires of 1947. After the fire, O'Hara continued to offer classroom instruction at summer workshops around the United States. O'Hara authored his first book of watercolor instruction in 1931, his final book was published in 1966.

During World War II, from 1943–44, he served in the Camouflage Section, Bureau of Ships, U.S. Navy. In the late 1940s O'Hara began making art education films for Encyclopaedia Britannica Films, his last film was made in 1961. In 1948 O'Hara was among the first water-colorists inducted into the National Academy of Design.

O'Hara died in Washington D.C. in 1969 from cancer of the kidney.

== Art ==
Marathon Key, 1968

Beginning with his first exhibitions, O'Hara was noted for his technical skill in watercolor. He preserved and advanced his mastery of the medium throughout his life, achieving a "miraculous" level of skill. For O'Hara, mastery was not an end but a means to achieve expression of his artistic voice. He wrote that "the problems of techniques and materials are of relatively minor importance" and that the goal is to use technique to achieve "the greatest possible emotional thrust."

O'Hara mainly painted outdoors, finding in nature a reliable source of inspiration. His later landscapes became less complex tending towards simple washes with spare, obvious brushstrokes. These later restrained and abstracted landscapes, of surprising simplicity, evoke a calm, profound power that "stand with the finest of American watercolors".

O'Hara worked primarily with transparent watercolors but he was open to other media. He taught himself several printmaking techniques, made collages, experimented with acrylics, and sometimes painted with gouache and casein.

== Teaching ==
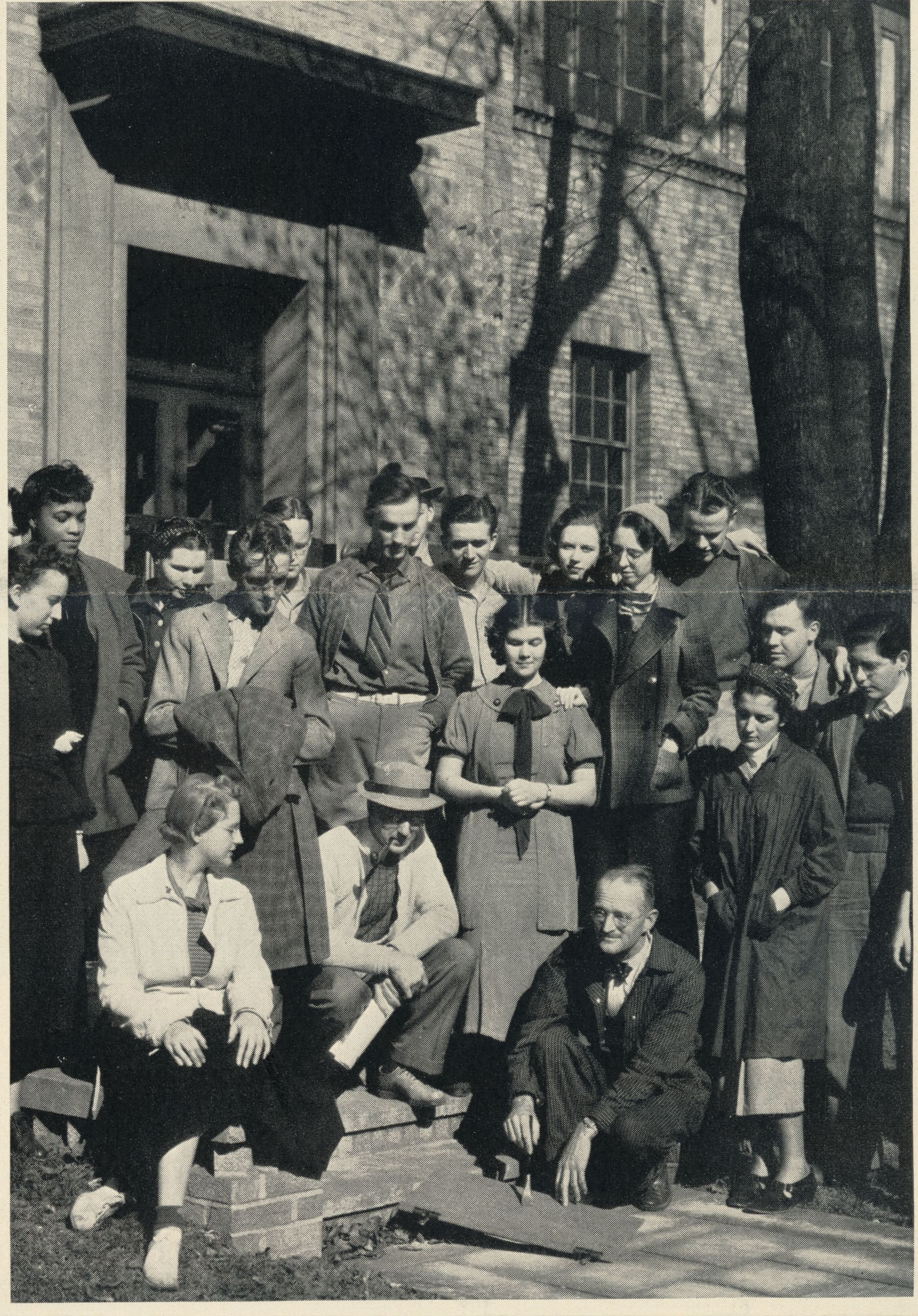
O'Hara teaching watercolor painting in Indianapolis.

O'Hara taught watercolor painting at his school in Maine and at classes sponsored by universities, museums and art associations around the United States. He said that his teaching was "predicated on the assumption that art itself cannot be taught". Therefore, his teaching focused on the development of technical skills as a means to self expression. His student, Carl Schmalz, attempted to capture the organization and content of his classroom teaching in the book Water Color Lessons from Eliot O'Hara.

In addition to his classroom teaching, O'Hara wrote books on watercolor painting and made art education films.

His notable students include Carl Schmalz, George Campbell Tinning, Elsie Lower Pomeroy, Standish Backus, and Marvin Mangus.

== Filmography ==
The following films were released by Encyclopaedia Britannica Films.

- Brush Techniques: The language of watercolor (1947). Demonstration by Eliot O'Hara.
- Painting Reflections in Water (1947). Demonstration by Eliot O'Hara.
- Painting an Abstraction, using planes (1950). Demonstration by Eliot O'Hara.
- Color Keying in Art and Living (1951).
- Painting Trees with Eliot O'Hara (1954). Best Art Film award, Cleveland, 1954.
- Rhythm in Paint (1954). Features demonstrations by Margaret Sheppard .
- Oriental brushwork (1956). Features demonstrations by Tyrus Wong and Chiura Obata. The film was digitized and re-released on DVD. A clip appears in the 2017 film Tyrus by Pamela Tom.
- Painting clouds (1956).
- Painting crowds of people (1956).
- Painting Shadows (1957).
- Drawing a Portrait (1957).
- Painting a Portrait (1957).
- Painting with Calligraphy (1958). Features demonstrations by George Post, and Paul Travis. Awarded Certificate of Merit, Cleveland, 1956.

The following films were released by Bee Cross-Media.

- Sea and surf (1960).
- Restraint (1961).

The following film has an unknown publisher.

- Space cutting (1961). Discusses neoplasticism, features the works of John McLaughlin and Pieter Mondriaan.

== Bibliography ==
=== Books authored by O'Hara ===
- O'Hara, Eliot (1931). Sgraffito prints. Washington, D.C., G. Dunthorne.
- O'Hara, E. (1932). Making watercolor behave: with two reproductions of paintings and twenty-one photographs demonstrating brush work.New York: Minton, Balch & company.
- O'Hara, E. (1935). Making the brush behave: fourteen lessons in watercolor painting; with twenty-nine illustrations. New York: Minton, Balch & company.
- O'Hara, E. (1938). Watercolor fares forth: eighteen experiments in watercolor painting with twenty-eight illustrations, ten in color. New York: Minton, Balch & company.
- O'Hara, E. (1939). Art teachers' primer: forty-four assignments to art classes, with eighteen blackboard diagrams and a frontispiece in color.New York: Minton, Balch & company.
- O'Hara, E. (1946). Watercolor at large: nineteen chapters on the renaissance of watercolor, with thirty illustrations, two in full color. New York: Minton, Balch & company.
- O'Hara, E. (1966). Watercolor with O'Hara. New York: Putnam.

=== Books coauthored by O'Hara ===
- Walker, P. Flory. (1948). Portraits in the making with Dorothy Short and Eliot O'Hara. New York: G.P. Putnam's Sons. The 1949 edition was entitled: Watercolor Portraiture.
- Flory, Phoebe. (1985). Watercolor Portraiture : A Practical Guide. New York: Dover Publications. Revised version of the Watercolor Portraiture (1949).

=== Books featuring O'Hara's work ===
- Schmalz, C. (1974). Watercolor Lessons from Eliot O'Hara. New York: Watson-Guptill.
- O'Hara, E., Schmalz, C., Eaton, T. A., & Boca Raton Museum of Art. (1994). Eliot O'Hara: The world in watercolor, 1925–1969. Boca Raton, FL: Boca Raton Museum of Art.
- Meek, W. (2018). ELIOT O'HARA's Ring of Fire in Watercolor. Blurb Self Publishing.

== Museums with O'Hara's works online ==
The following museums have one or more of O'Hara's works available in their online databases.

- Mead Art Museum at Amherst College: contains examples spanning 5 decades of O'Hara's work, including works from his journey to the Soviet Union.
- Portland Museum of Art: contains 6 paintings by O'Hara.
- Bowdoin College Museum of Art: contains several portraits by O'Hara. In addition, there are works by other artists donated to the museum by Eliot O'Hara; some of these works appear as illustrations in his books.
- Anchorage Museum: several of O'Hara's paintings from the 1940s.
- Smithsonian American Art Museum: aquatints and etchings by O'Hara as well as several photographs of O'Hara.
- Hirshhorn Museum and Sculpture Garden: a painting from 1938 and one from 1968.
- Boston Museum of Fine Arts: paintings from 1940s and 50's, in black and white.
