= Christmas Prelude =

Festival in Kennebunkport, Maine

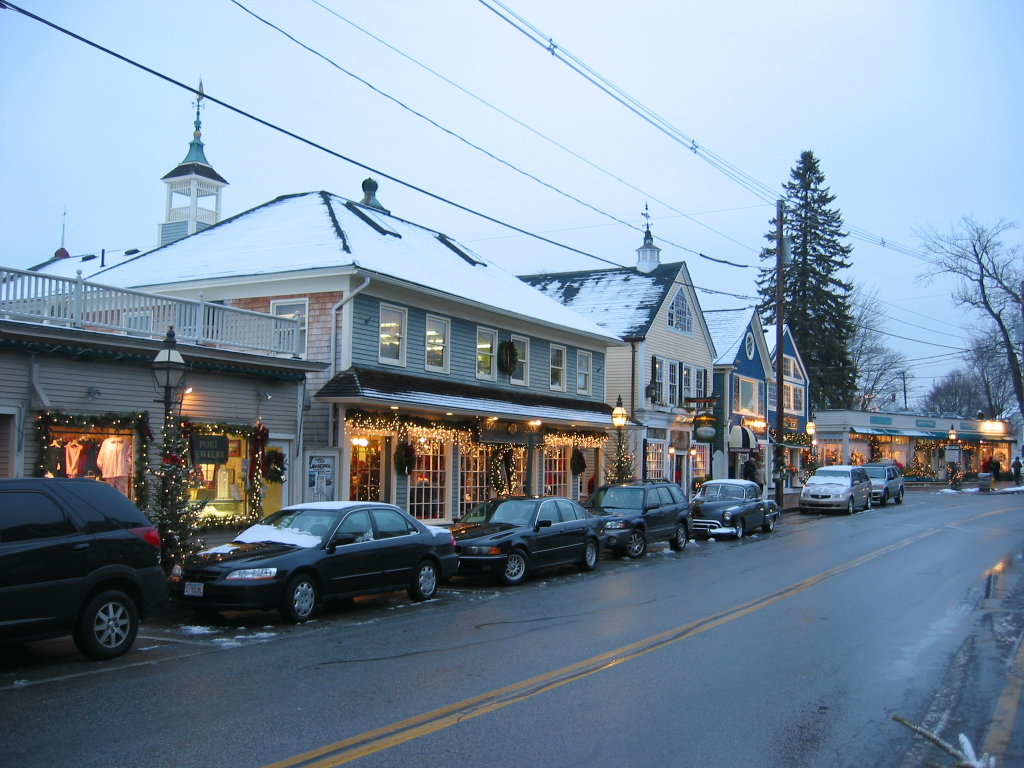
- Western Avenue in Kennebunkport, December 2004
- Genre: Winter holiday season
- Dates: late November or early December
- Locations: Kennebunkport, Maine, U.S.
- Founded: 1982 (44 years ago)
- Website: christmasprelude.com

Christmas Prelude is an annual festival in Kennebunkport, Maine, United States, coinciding with the unofficial start of the winter holiday shopping season. Many retailers in the town remain open late to allow customers to browse the stores before and after the tree lighting in Dock Square. The tree is lit on the first Friday of December, after a performance of carols from the local high school. The tree is noted for its decorations in the form of lobster traps.

A fireworks display has taken place after the tree lighting since 2011. The Prelude is put on with the help of hundreds of volunteers. The event is an opportunity for many groups in the Kennebunk area to fundraise.

Established in 1982, after a meeting of local business people spearheaded by Henry Pasco, the event takes place in late November or early December. The 2022 Prelude was the 41st edition; the 42nd will run from November 30 to December 10, 2023.

HGTV named Kennebunkport runners-up in their "Christmas Town in America" ranking.

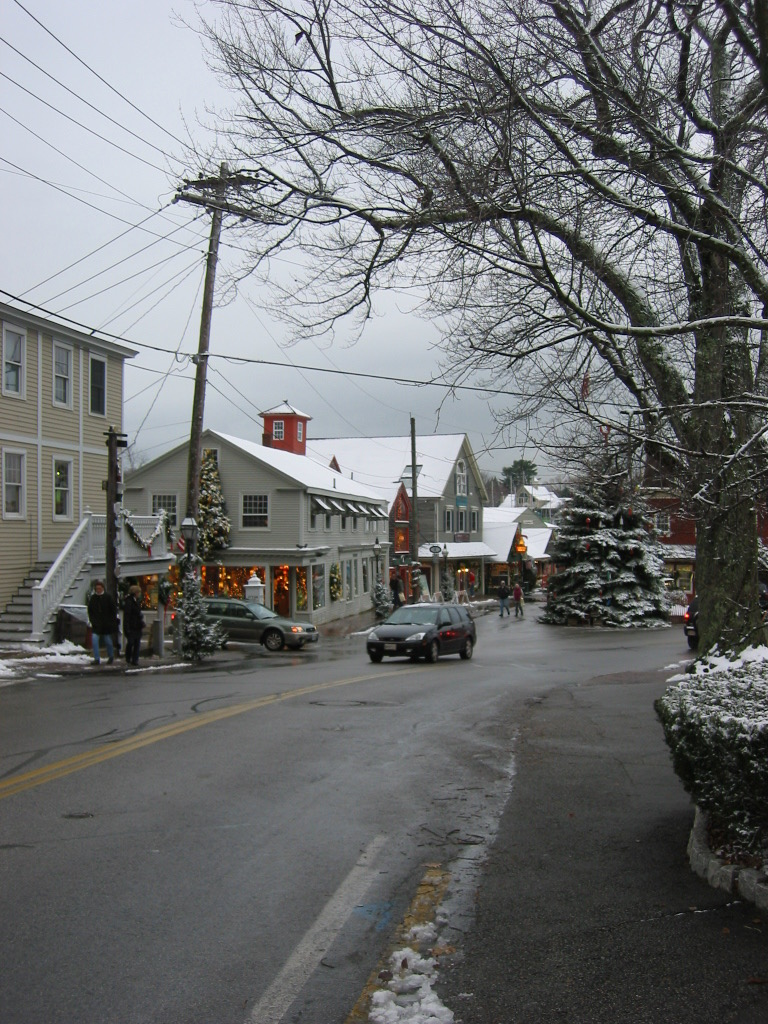
Looking southwest down Spring Street to the Christmas tree in Dock Square

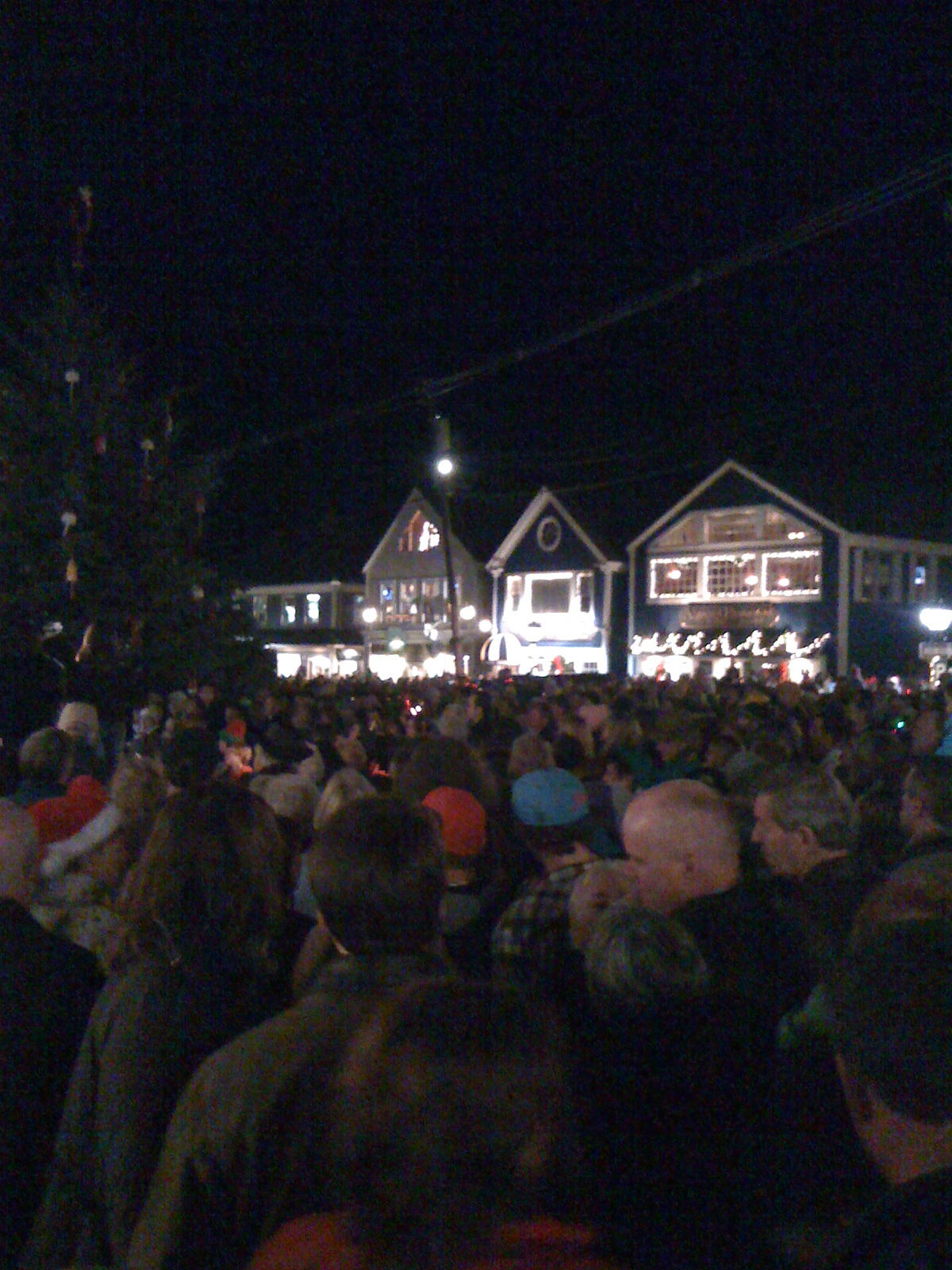
Shortly before the 2009 tree lighting

== See also ==
- Mathew Lanigan
