= Cape Porpoise, Maine =

Coastal village in Maine, United States

Coordinates: 43°22′21″N 70°26′17″W

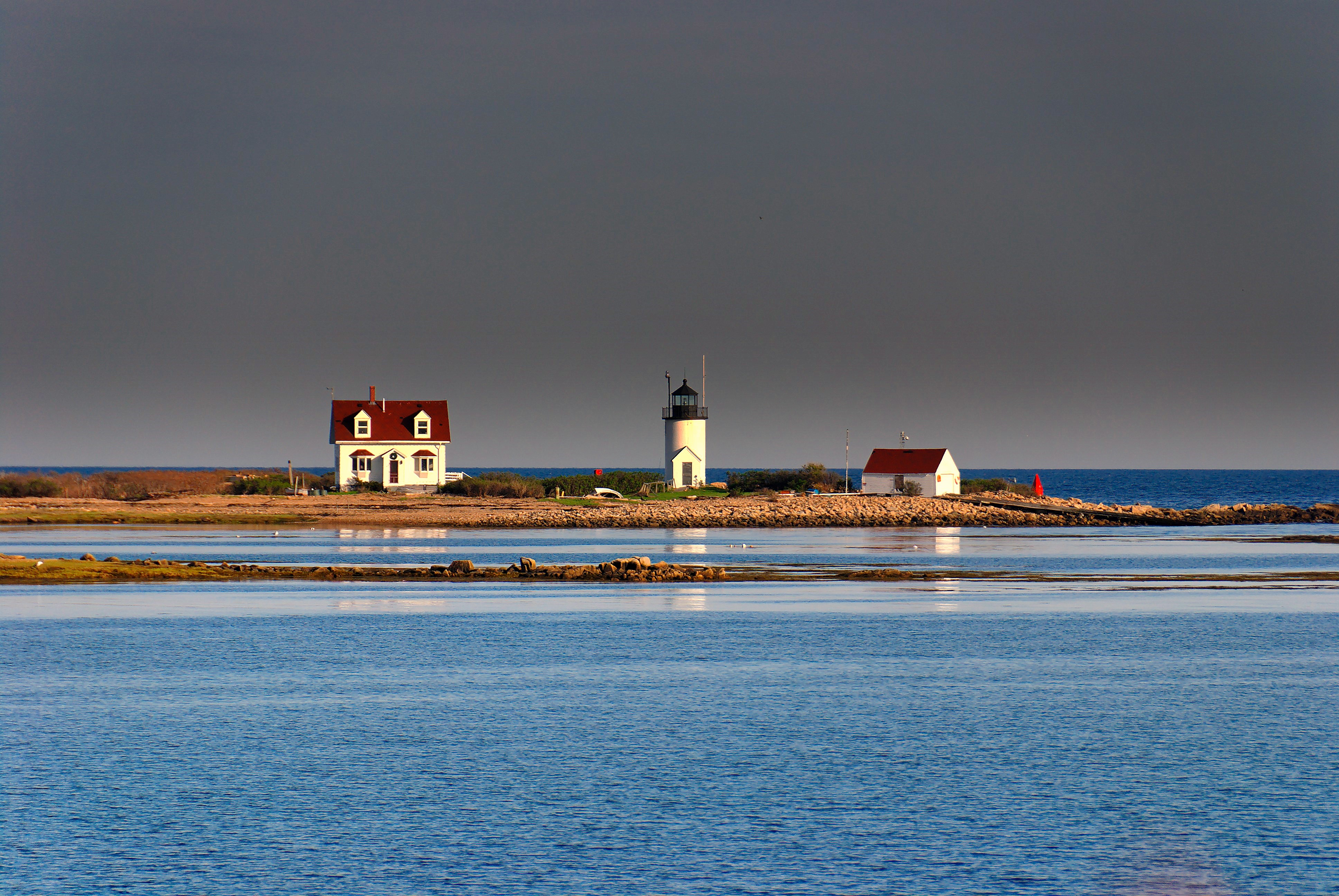
Goat Island Light

Cape Porpoise is a small coastal village in the town of Kennebunkport, Maine, United States, and was the original English settlement of the town. It is located northeast of Dock Square and southwest of Goose Rocks Beach. The village occupies the mainland adjacent to Cape Porpoise Harbor. More than a dozen islands protect the deep natural harbor. The ZIP Code for Cape Porpoise is 04014.

Goat Island Light marks the harbor entrance between Goat and Folly islands.

== History ==
Archeological evidence exists of human activity in the area now known as Cape Porpoise 7,000 years ago. In 1602, the time of contact with Europeans, it was occupied by communities of the Almouchiquois people, who referred to the area as Nampscoscocke and had settlements at Gooch's Beach and Great Hill in Kennebunk 3 miles south of Cape Porpoise. According to 1640 land records, a sagamore of that community was called Thomas Chabinock.

Cape Porpoise was named by explorer Captain John Smith in 1614 during his exploration of New England. English fishermen began making seasonal residences in the area beginning about 1619 until a year-round European settlement was established in 1629, based on a land grant from the Plymouth Colony. The town was incorporated as "Cape Porpus" under the government of the Massachusetts Bay Colony in 1653.

The Europeans cut or thinned forested areas to support their agricultural and forestry economy, which undermined the hunting and pastoral livelihoods of Indian communities. This led to conflict. During King William's War in 1689, Indians forced the settlers off the mainland and onto Stage Island until rescued by English authorities. English settlers did not return to the town until 1699. The Wabanaki Confederacy, which had been created among Abenaki to resist English encroachment, had prevailed in the northern theater of King William's War and continued to push for the removal of European settlers from the area after that war ended. Indians drove English settlers from Cape Porpoise again in 1703. After the settlers' return in 1717, Indians made further attacks against in 1723-1727. Active hostilities only stopped when France, the Indians' military ally, ceded southern Maine to England after King George's War.

During the American Revolutionary War, on August 8, 1782, the English 16-gun brig Meriam and the schooner Hammond entered the harbor and attempted to take a schooner and sloop as prizes. The English took the schooner but ran the sloop aground. The town militia had assembled and fired shore cannons and muskets at the English. The English burned the sloop and then returned to their brig but couldn't escape the harbor because of a growing southern breeze. Over the next few hours, the English towed and warped the brig out of the harbor under musket and cannon fire even as they tried to return gun fire. All combined, more than 20 men were killed during the battle, including Captain James Burnham, one of the town leaders, and the only American casualty.

In July 2010, singer Taylor Swift filmed the music video for her hit single "Mine" here. She filmed parts of the video in the popular Wayfarer restaurant, The Captain's restaurant, and in a local river.

== Geography ==
The village is located on State Highway 9.
