= Standish Backus =

American naval officer and painter (1910–1989)

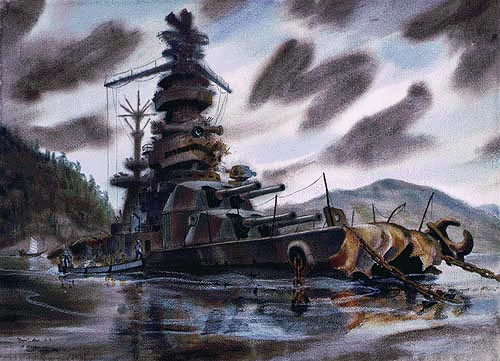
Backus' 1946 painting of the Japanese battleship Hyūga

Standish Backus, Jr. (April 5, 1910 – October 12, 1989) was a United States military artist.

== Biography ==
Born in Detroit, he attended Princeton University, where he obtained in 1933 a degree in architecture. He then spent a year at the Ludwig-Maximilians-Universität München studying painting. After a brief period in Maine studying watercolor under Eliot O'Hara, he relocated to Santa Barbara, in 1935 and began working full-time as an artist. At the start of the Second World War he commissioned as an ensign in the Naval Reserve in 1940, and became an active-duty officer in 1941. He spent most of the war assigned to Net and Boom Defenses in the South Pacific.

He transferred to a special graphic presentation unit in 1945 and spent the last year of the Pacific theater as a combat artist. By the end of the war he had obtained the rank of commander. He left active service in May 1946 and taught at the University of California, Santa Barbara from 1947 to 1948.

He returned to active duty in 1955 to 1956 to travel with Admiral Richard Evelyn Byrd to Antarctica as part of "Operation Deepfreeze" to record images of the exploration.

Backus returned to California and continued to paint. He died in Santa Barbara in 1989. His work is in the collections of the Santa Barbara Museum of Art, the Los Angeles County Museum of Art, and the Naval Historical Center.

In 1936 in New York City, Backus married Barbara Babcock, who predeceased him. Upon his death, he was survived by a daughter, a granddaughter, and three sisters. His brother Charles Backus, who graduated from Princeton University, in 1939, was killed in 1965 while foxhunting, when his horse failed to make a jump and fell on top of him.

== Standish Backus Sr. ==
The only son of Charles Kellogg Backus and Eva Backus, née Standish (a descendant of Myles Standish), Standish Backus Sr. (1875–1943) was born in Detroit on January 12, 1875. He graduated in 1898 with an A.B. from the University of Michigan and in 1901 with an LL.B. from the Detroit College of Law. He became a corporate lawyer, a member of the law firm of Stevenson, Carpenter, Butzel, & Backus, and general counsel for General Motors. In January 1907 he married Lotta E. Boyer, daughter of Joseph Boyer, who was the president of Burroughs Adding Machine Corporation until 1920. From 1920 until his sudden death on July 14, 1943, Standish Backus Sr. was the president of the Burroughs Adding Machine Corporation. He was a member of several clubs, including the Detroit Club, the Detroit Boat Club, the Detroit Athletic Club, and New York City's Grolier Club.

== Standish Backus Mansion ==
The architect Ralph Adams Cram, in association with the Detroit-based architect Robert Ovens Derrick (1890–1961), designed a new home (completed in 1934) for Standish Backus Sr. and his wife Lotta. The cost of the house, located on a 12-acre estate in Grosse Pointe Shores, was about $1,000,000 (at a time when gold sold for $35 per ounce). The 40-room residence was in the Tudor style with a stone façade, prominent chimneys, mullioned windows, and elaborate wood work. The mansion had an 8-car garage with electrically-operated doors, a telephone system connecting all the rooms, and a walk-in vault.

The estate had a long, straight driveway, separated from the lawn by clipped yews. The famous landscape architect Fletcher Steele designed the estate's garden. Cram and Steele worked closely together to ensure harmony between house and garden. The formal garden, with many Baroque architectural features, had spacious lawns, herb gardens, flower gardens, and a plant nursery. The mansion with its 12-acre estate was sold to Horace Caulkins Ford (1930–2023) in 1966 — the mansion was soon demolished with the land turned into a housing subdivision named "Stratton Place".
