= Dock Square (Kennebunkport) =

Public square in Kennebunkport, Maine

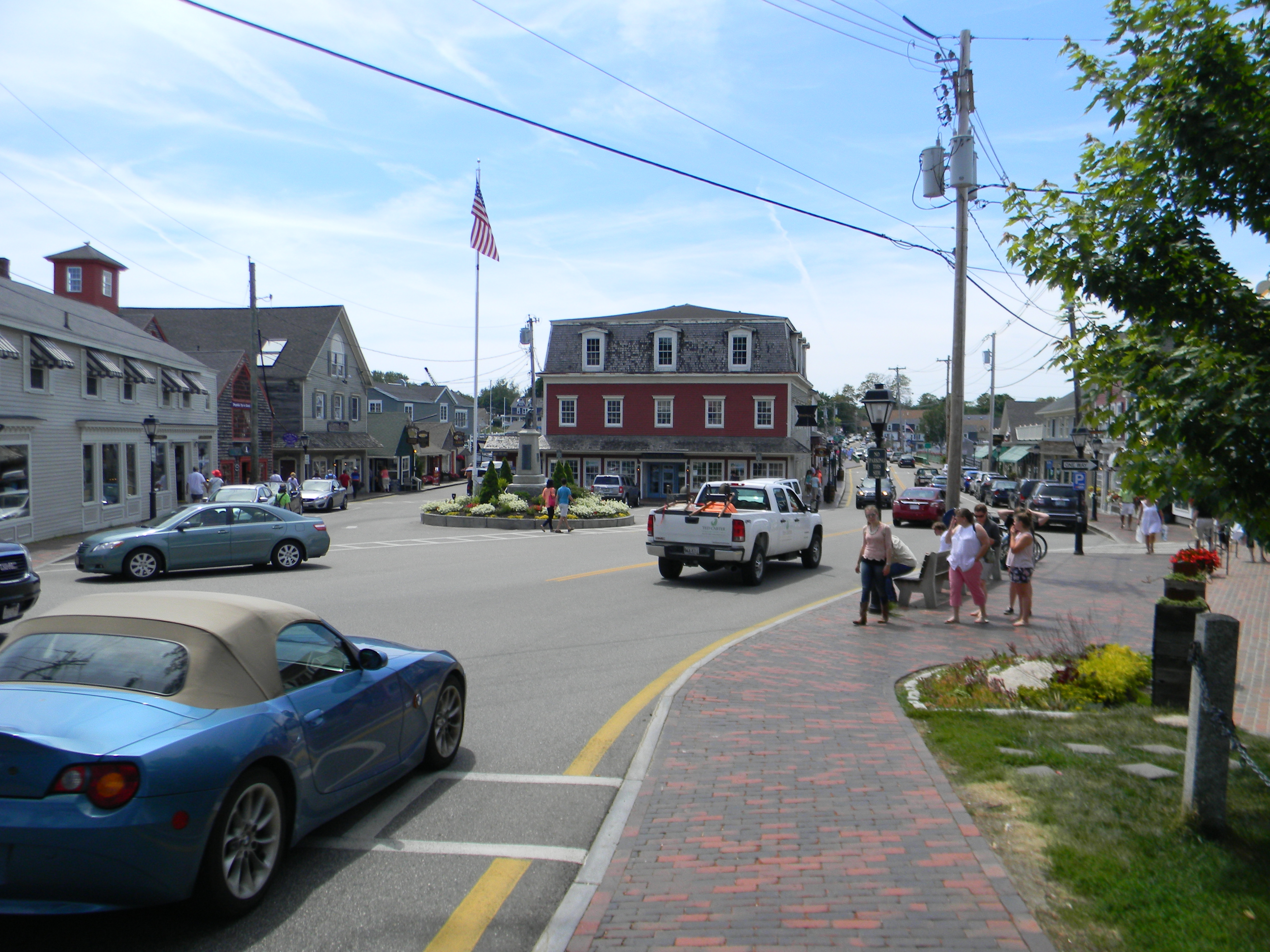
- Dock Square in 2015, looking southwest toward Kennebunk
- Interactive map of Dock Square
- Maintained by: Town of Kennebunkport
- Location: Kennebunkport, Maine, U.S.
- Coordinates: 43.361667°N 70.476972°W

Dock Square is a public square in Kennebunkport, Maine, United States. It stands at the intersections of Western Avenue (part of State Route 9), Spring Street and Ocean Avenue and extends southwest to the Mathew J. Lanigan Bridge separating Kennebunkport from Kennebunk.

The square is popular with tourists browsing the shops, boutiques and galleries, housed in former homes and 18th-century warehouses. The town's Christmas Prelude sees a Christmas tree being lit in the center of the square, a tradition begun in 1982. In addition, a fireworks festival is held in the square annually on July 4.

Former U.S. president George H. W. Bush and first lady Barbara often shopped in Dock Square while staying at nearby Walker's Point Estate.
