= Goose Rocks =

Beach in Maine, United States

Coordinates: 43°23′56.0″N 70°24′38.0″W

Goose Rocks Beach (formerly known as "Beachwood"), is a public beach located in the town of Kennebunkport, Maine United States, bordered by Cape Porpoise, Maine (another neighborhood of Kennebunkport) to the southwest, and Granite Point (a coastal neighborhood of Biddeford, Maine ) to the northeast. The village is inhabited mainly by summer residents from surrounding states and Canadian provinces. The Little River, which forms a border between Kennebunkport and Biddeford, empties into Goosefare Bay, the body of water that faces Goose Rocks Beach. Goose Rocks is unofficially bounded by the Batson River to the south-west, Route 9 to the northwest, and the Little River to the northeast. In 2009 Goose Rocks Beach was the subject of a lawsuit which multiple beach-front property owners filed against the town of Kennebunkport, claiming that they owned the beach in front of their homes up to the high tide water line. Goose Rocks Beach was the site of the O'Hara Watercolor School run by American watercolor painter Eliot O'Hara from 1930 to 1947. The school and many other buildings burned down in the Great Fires of 1947.

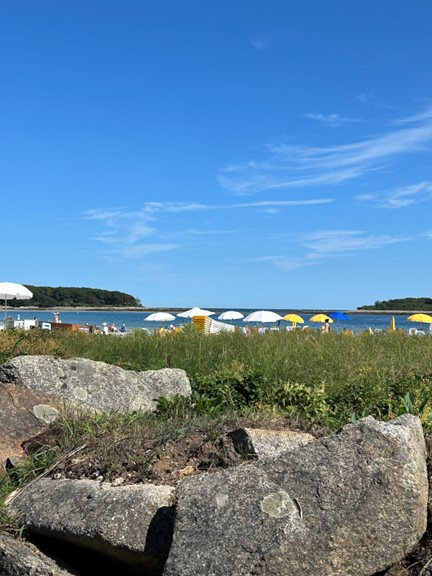
Photo taken in Goose Rocks
