= O'Hara Waltham Dial factory =

- O'Hara Waltham Dial Company
- U.S. National Register of Historic Places
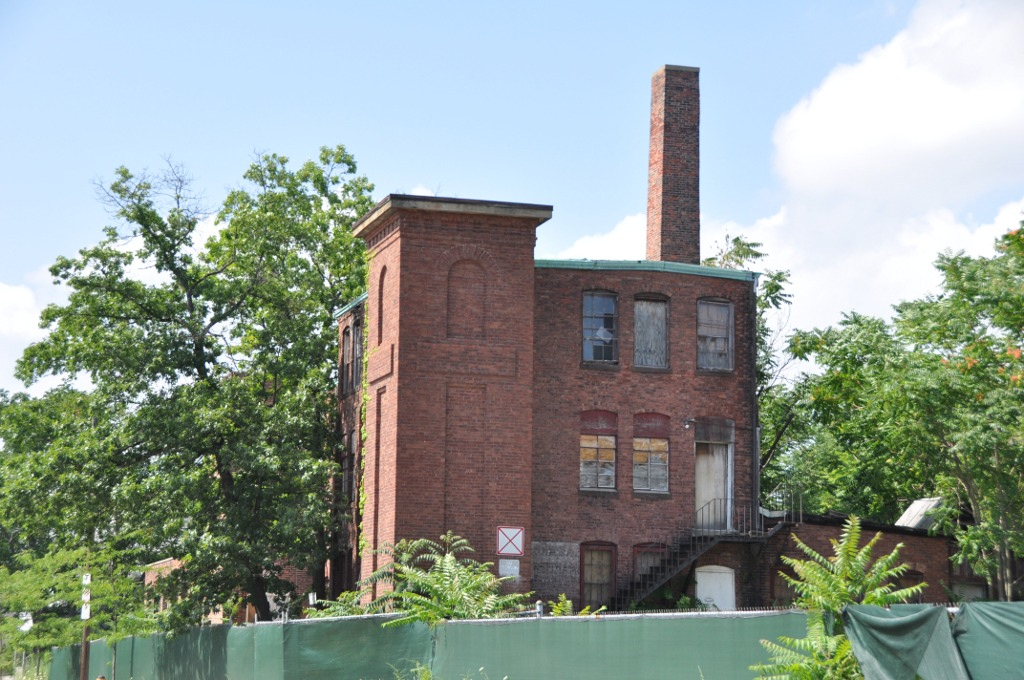

- Location within Massachusetts Location within the United States
- Location: 74 Rumford Ave., Waltham, Massachusetts
- Coordinates: 42°21′34″N 71°14′36.4″W
- Built: 1897
- MPS: Waltham MRA
- NRHP reference No.: 89001533
- Added to NRHP: September 28, 1989

The O'Hara Waltham Dial factory was a historic building at 74 Rumford Avenue in Waltham, Massachusetts. The three-story brick structure was built in 1897 by Daniel O'Hara, and housed his company, a spinoff from the Waltham Watch Company which specialized in the manufacture of a variety of clock faces. The building had distinctive corner towers with paneled brick surfaces, although these were a later (early 1900s) addition. O'Hara's company operated until the late 1950s; the facility was then used in the manufacture of traffic signals and luggage.

The building was listed on the National Register of Historic Places in 1989.

On April 5, 2019, the city of Waltham issued a Notice of Unsafe Structure for the building. On June 12, 2019 it was decided that the building was beyond repair and was subsequently demolished. The lot is currently vacant, and some of the original foundations remain.

== See also ==
- National Register of Historic Places listings in Waltham, Massachusetts
