= Kennebunk River =

River in the U.S. state of Maine

Coordinates: 43°26′53.6″N 70°34′25.7″W

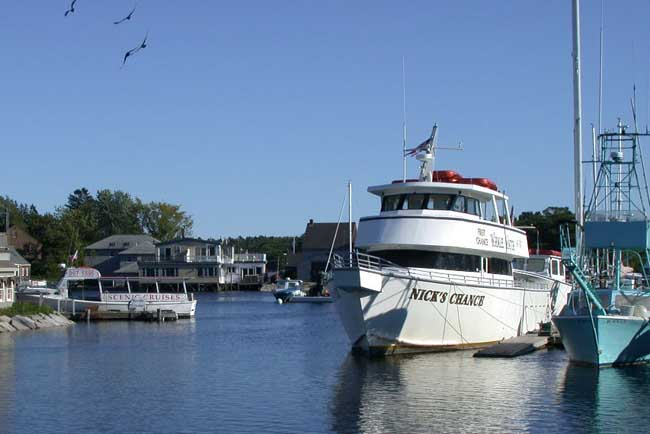
Boats on the Kennebunk River in Kennebunkport

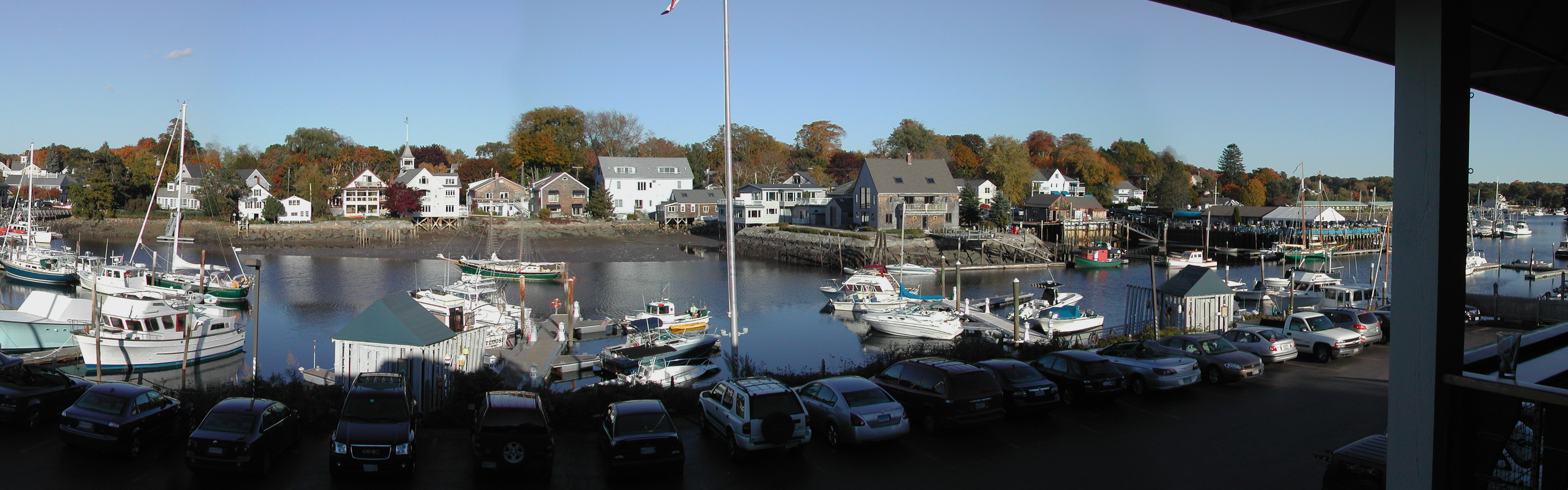
Panoramic view of the Kennebunk River taken on the deck of Federal Jack's Restaurant

The Kennebunk River is a 17.6-mile-long (28.3 km) river in York County, Maine in the United States. It drains a settled rural area southwest of Portland, emptying into the Atlantic Ocean.

It rises in central York County, at the junction of Carlisle Brook and Lords Brook in the town of Lyman. Lords Brook issues from Kennebunk Pond in Lyman. The Kennebunk River flows generally southeast, passing under Interstate 95 and U.S. Route 1. It flows past the town center of Kennebunkport, where it becomes navigable, and enters the Atlantic in Kennebunkport, approximately one-half mile (1 km) downstream from the town center.
