= Kennebunkport, Maine =

Town in Maine, United States

- Town
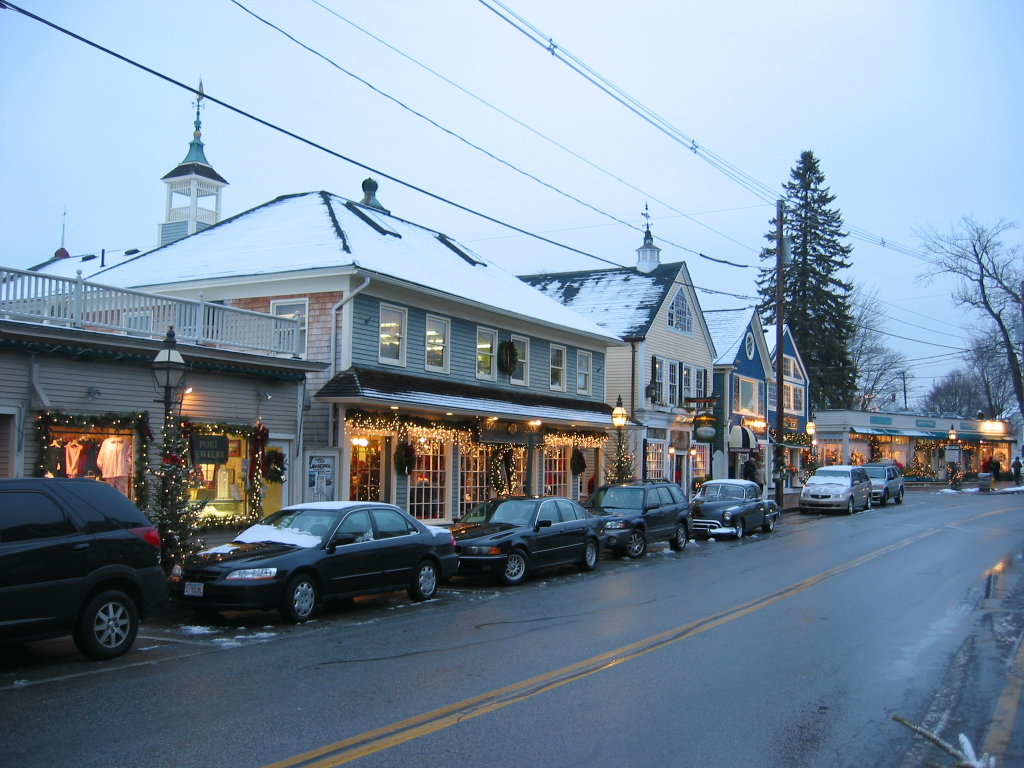
- Downtown during the Christmas season, looking towards Dock Square

- Flag Seal

- Location within Maine Location within the United States
- Coordinates: 43°22′51″N 70°25′27″W
- Country: United States
- State: Maine
- County: York
- Incorporated: July 5, 1653

Government
  - Type: Town Meeting

Area
  - Land: 18.6 sq mi (48 km^{2})
- Elevation: 0 ft (0 m)

Population (2020)
  - Total: 3,629
  - Density: 195.1/sq mi (75.3/km^{2})
- Time zone: UTC-5 (Eastern (EST))
  - Summer (DST): UTC-4 (EDT)
- ZIP Codes: 04046 (Kennebunkport); 04014 (Cape Porpoise)
- Area code: 207
- FIPS code: 23-36745
- GNIS feature ID: 582540
- Website: kennebunkportme.gov

Kennebunkport /ˌkɛniˈbʌŋkˌpɔːrt/ is a resort town in York County, Maine, United States. The population was 3,629 at the 2020 census. It is part of the Portland metropolitan area.

The town center, the area in and around Dock Square, is located along the Kennebunk River, approximately 1 mile (1.6 km) from the mouth of the river on the Atlantic Ocean. Historically a shipbuilding and fishing village, for well over a century the town has been a popular summer colony and seaside tourist destination. The Dock Square area has a district of souvenir shops, art galleries, schooner attractions, seafood restaurants, and bed and breakfasts. Cape Porpoise, while retaining its identity as a fishing harbor, has a very small village area with several restaurants and stores, as well as a church, small library, and art gallery. The Kennebunkport Christmas Prelude takes place annually in the town, beginning either in late November or early December.

Kennebunkport has a reputation as a summer haven for the upper class and is one of the wealthiest communities in the state of Maine. The Municipality of Kennebunkport includes the constituent villages of Kennebunkport Village, Cape Arundel & Colony Beach, the Cottage Coast, Wilde's District (Wildwood), Goose Rocks Beach, Tributts Creek, Cape Porpoise Village, North Village Crossing (Townhouse Corner), among various other newer developments. The town is the home of Walker's Point, a summer estate of the Bush family. Kennebunkport and neighboring towns Kennebunk and Arundel comprise school district RSU 21.

== History ==
Archeological evidence exists of activity in the area now known as Cape Porpoise 7000 years ago. In 1602, the time of contact with Europeans, it was occupied by communities of the Almouchiquois people, who referred to the area as Nampscoscock. According to 1640 land records, a sagamore of that community was "Thomas" Chabinock.

Kennebunkport was first incorporated in 1653 as Cape Porpus, subject to the government of the Massachusetts Bay Colony (Maine was admitted to the Union in 1820 as part of the Missouri Compromise). Due to Abenaki Indian resistance to colonial expansion, European settlers abandoned the town by 1689 and did not return for at least ten years. The Wabanaki Confederacy again expelled English from the area from 1703 to 1717, and continued violent resistance to colonization until the end of King George's War in 1748.

Indian settlements continued to be present and interspersed with English colonial settlements during that time and later during Maine statehood. When the United States Congress was debating the Indian Removal Act, residents of Kennebunk sent to Congress a statement advocating for the preservation of Indian rights and property. A settlement of Penobscot and Passamaquoddy continued until at least the 1880s.

The town was renamed Arundel in 1701, and the town center located inland at Burbank Hill.
On August 8, 1782, Arundel was under attack by two loyalist vessels: the 16 gun brig "Miriam" [Richard Pomroy] and the schooner "Hammond" [Doty] captured two unnamed vessels from Newbury Massachusetts (a schooner and a sloop). The sloop was burned after it went aground on Goat Island. A battle took place between the vessels and the militia ashore. The Patriot casualties were Captain James Burnham killed in action; civilian Samuel Wildes was wounded when he demanded the Loyalists return the vessels they had taken. In 1821 the town was renamed again, this time to Kennebunkport in reflection to its economy becoming one of shipbuilding and trade along the Kennebunk River.

By the 1870s the town had developed as a popular summer destination, with both hotels and homes constructed along its coastline. Cape Arundel, Cape Porpoise, and Beachwood (now called Goose Rocks) were some of the early summer colonies; although Cape Porpoise was, and still is, a working fishing harbor. Since 1939, Kennebunkport has been home to the Seashore Trolley Museum.

The Great Fires of 1947, which devastated much of York County, affected Kennebunkport and especially the area near Goose Rocks Beach. Much of the housing near Goose Rocks Beach was destroyed by the fire, but the area has since recovered and been rebuilt.

== Geology ==
Like much of the northeast coast, the geography of the southern Maine coast was largely directed by the retreat of the Laurentide ice cap about 23,000 years ago. The coast is framed by bedrock, left during the formation of the Appalachian mountains, and the irregular shape of the coast (characteristic of much of the New England coast, with the exception of Cape Cod and the islands) is attributed to differential erosion of the underlying rock layer.

The coast along Kennebunkport differs sharply from the Maine coast north and east of Portland due to differences in the composition of this rock layer. Beyond Portland, the layer is a largely metamorphic rock, but here the coast is a mixture of igneous rock, and embayments of more deeply eroded sedimentary and metamorphic rock. These embayments result in the sandy beaches that can be found in southern Maine (such as Goose Rocks Beach, Colony Beach, and nearby Kennebunk Beach) but are uncommon north of Portland. Likewise, the geology here differs from that of the outer lands (Cape Cod, Nantucket, and Martha's Vineyard in Massachusetts, Block Island in Rhode Island, and Long Island in New York), which were formed as terminal and recessional moraines, and do not contain much in the way of a bedrock skeleton.

== Geography ==
According to the United States Census Bureau, the town has a total area of 49.35 square miles (127.82 km^{2}), of which 20.52 square miles (53.15 km^{2}) is land and 28.83 square miles (74.67 km^{2}) is water.

The town has several distinct areas, each developed during a phase of the town's history. The original town center was at Cape Porpoise, which today has a small village center, is both a summer colony and year-round community, and hosts a working fishing harbor. Inland from Cape Porpoise is a mix of forest and agricultural land, punctuated by a historic town center at Burbank Hill (there are a few historic buildings of interest here, including a schoolhouse and jail). Heading west, towards the mouth of the Kennebunk River is Dock Square, the current town center.

In the late 19th and early 20th century, Kennebunkport, and especially Cape Arundel (also known as Point Arundel), developed as a summer colony for the wealthy. Traveling from Dock Square along Ocean Avenue is the Cape Arundel Summer Colony Historic District. This district of many well-preserved examples of early-20th-century shingle-style cottages begins at Chick's Creek and ends at Walker's Point.

=== Climate ===
This climatic region is typified by large seasonal temperature differences, with warm to hot (and often humid) summers and cold (sometimes severely cold) winters. According to the Köppen climate classification system, Kennebunkport has a humid continental climate, abbreviated Dfb on climate maps.

Climate data for Kennebunkport, Maine (1991–2020 normals, extremes 1989–present)
Month	Jan	Feb	Mar	Apr	May	Jun	Jul	Aug	Sep	Oct	Nov	Dec	Year
Record high °F (°C)	63 (17)	68 (20)	77 (25)	91 (33)	92 (33)	97 (36)	99 (37)	96 (36)	93 (34)	84 (29)	79 (26)	75 (24)	99 (37)
Mean maximum °F (°C)	51.1 (10.6)	52.1 (11.2)	60.0 (15.6)	73.3 (22.9)	82.0 (27.8)	87.7 (30.9)	90.5 (32.5)	87.9 (31.1)	83.2 (28.4)	73.7 (23.2)	64.1 (17.8)	55.5 (13.1)	92.6 (33.7)
Mean daily maximum °F (°C)	32.7 (0.4)	34.9 (1.6)	41.2 (5.1)	52.0 (11.1)	61.6 (16.4)	70.8 (21.6)	76.9 (24.9)	76.0 (24.4)	69.3 (20.7)	58.6 (14.8)	48.3 (9.1)	38.8 (3.8)	55.1 (12.8)
Daily mean °F (°C)	22.9 (−5.1)	24.7 (−4.1)	32.0 (0.0)	42.1 (5.6)	52.1 (11.2)	61.5 (16.4)	67.3 (19.6)	66.2 (19.0)	59.1 (15.1)	48.1 (8.9)	38.7 (3.7)	29.4 (−1.4)	45.3 (7.4)
Mean daily minimum °F (°C)	13.1 (−10.5)	14.4 (−9.8)	22.7 (−5.2)	32.3 (0.2)	42.7 (5.9)	52.3 (11.3)	57.8 (14.3)	56.5 (13.6)	48.9 (9.4)	37.5 (3.1)	29.2 (−1.6)	20.0 (−6.7)	35.6 (2.0)
Mean minimum °F (°C)	−6.7 (−21.5)	−3.9 (−19.9)	3.6 (−15.8)	20.4 (−6.4)	29.5 (−1.4)	40.3 (4.6)	46.6 (8.1)	44.3 (6.8)	33.1 (0.6)	23.7 (−4.6)	14.4 (−9.8)	2.6 (−16.3)	−9.7 (−23.2)
Record low °F (°C)	−20 (−29)	−19 (−28)	−10 (−23)	13 (−11)	16 (−9)	34 (1)	35 (2)	29 (−2)	19 (−7)	12 (−11)	−3 (−19)	−15 (−26)	−20 (−29)
Average precipitation inches (mm)	3.65 (93)	3.71 (94)	4.68 (119)	4.73 (120)	4.21 (107)	4.69 (119)	3.90 (99)	3.88 (99)	3.93 (100)	5.63 (143)	4.17 (106)	4.82 (122)	52.00 (1,321)
Average snowfall inches (cm)	13.3 (34)	13.3 (34)	9.8 (25)	1.3 (3.3)	0.0 (0.0)	0.0 (0.0)	0.0 (0.0)	0.0 (0.0)	0.0 (0.0)	0.1 (0.25)	0.7 (1.8)	10.4 (26)	48.9 (124.35)
Average extreme snow depth inches (cm)	11.6 (29)	12.7 (32)	11.7 (30)	2.0 (5.1)	0.0 (0.0)	0.0 (0.0)	0.0 (0.0)	0.0 (0.0)	0.0 (0.0)	0.1 (0.25)	0.7 (1.8)	7.3 (19)	18.7 (47)
Average precipitation days (≥ 0.01 in)	10.7	9.0	10.6	11.9	12.8	12.7	11.0	10.1	9.9	12.1	11.1	12.2	134.1
Average snowy days (≥ 0.1 in)	5.8	4.8	3.2	0.6	0.0	0.0	0.0	0.0	0.0	0.1	0.7	4.0	19.2
Source 1: NOAA
Source 2: National Weather Service

=== Adjacent municipalities ===
- Biddeford (north)
- Kennebunk (southwest)
- Arundel (west)

==== Rachel Carson National Wildlife Refuge ====
The Rachel Carson National Wildlife Refuge has a significant portion of lands in Kennebunkport, northeast of Cape Porpoise and through Goose Rocks. Within Kennebunkport, much of this protected land is salt-water marsh.

== Summer home of the Bush family ==
Kennebunkport was also the summer home of former U.S. President George H. W. Bush, father of former U.S. President George W. Bush. First built by Bush's maternal grandfather George Herbert Walker, it has been a family home ever since, and has been owned by the Bush family since sometime in the early 1980s. The Bushes' ancestry is distinct from the Walker family that settled York County, Maine. Some of this family's Walker relatives are buried in the Kennebunkport area ancient cemeteries. During his presidency, George H.W. Bush often invited world leaders, from Margaret Thatcher to Mikhail Gorbachev, to Kennebunkport. In 2007, his son George W. Bush invited Vladimir Putin and Nicolas Sarkozy. The Bush compound is on Walkers Point, called Point Vesuvius prior to the Walker family's acquisition.

In 2016, former First Lady Laura Bush, spoke at the dedication of the reopening of the front door at Graves Library, and announced the commencement of a campaign to raise funds for a new-mothers wing at the library.

== Demographics ==
Historical population
Census	Pop.	Note	%±
1830	2,763		—
1840	2,768		0.2%
1850	2,706		−2.2%
1860	2,668		−1.4%
1870	2,372		−11.1%
1880	2,405		1.4%
1890	2,196		−8.7%
1900	2,123		−3.3%
1910	2,130		0.3%
1920	1,431		−32.8%
1930	1,284		−10.3%
1940	1,448		12.8%
1950	1,522		5.1%
1960	1,851		21.6%
1970	2,160		16.7%
1980	2,952		36.7%
1990	3,356		13.7%
2000	3,720		10.8%
2010	3,474		−6.6%
2020	3,629		4.5%
U.S. Decennial Census

As of 2000, the median income for a household in the town was $54,219, and the median income for a family was $66,505. Males had a median income of $43,125 versus $34,028 for females. The per capita income for the town was $36,707. About 1.7% of families and 4.4% of the population were below the poverty line, including 4.4% of those under age 18 and 1.4% of those age 65 or over.

=== 2010 census ===
As of the census of 2010, there were 3,474 people, 1,578 households, and 1,039 families residing in the town. The population density was 169.3 inhabitants per square mile (65.4/km^{2}). There were 2,897 housing units at an average density of 141.2 per square mile (54.5/km^{2}). The racial makeup of the town was 99.0% White, 0.2% African American, 0.1% Native American, 0.7% Asian, 0.3% from other races, and 0.7% from two or more races. Hispanic or Latino of any race were 0.9% of the population.

There were 1,578 households, of which 22.1% had children under the age of 18 living with them, 56.7% were married couples living together, 6.4% had a female householder with no husband present, 2.8% had a male householder with no wife present, and 34.2% were non-families. 28.6% of all households were made up of individuals, and 13.1% had someone living alone who was 65 years of age or older. The average household size was 2.20 and the average family size was 2.68.

The median age in the town was 51.8 years. 17.9% of residents were under the age of 18; 5.6% were between the ages of 18 and 24; 15.2% were from 25 to 44; 36.5% were from 45 to 64, and 24.7% were 65 years of age or older. The sex makeup of the town was 47.5% male and 52.5% female.

== Education ==
It is in the Regional School Unit 21.

== Gallery ==
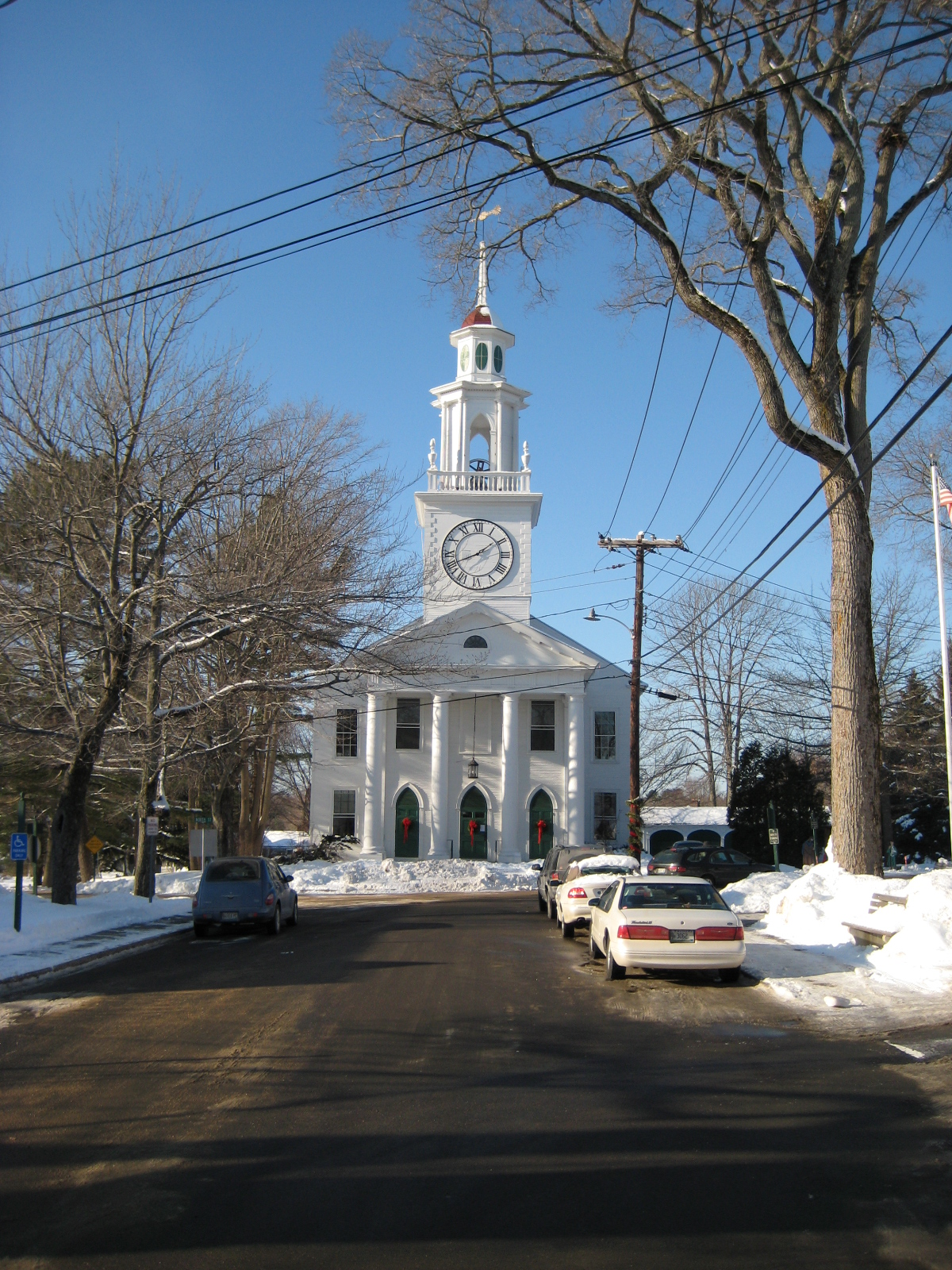
South Congregational Church

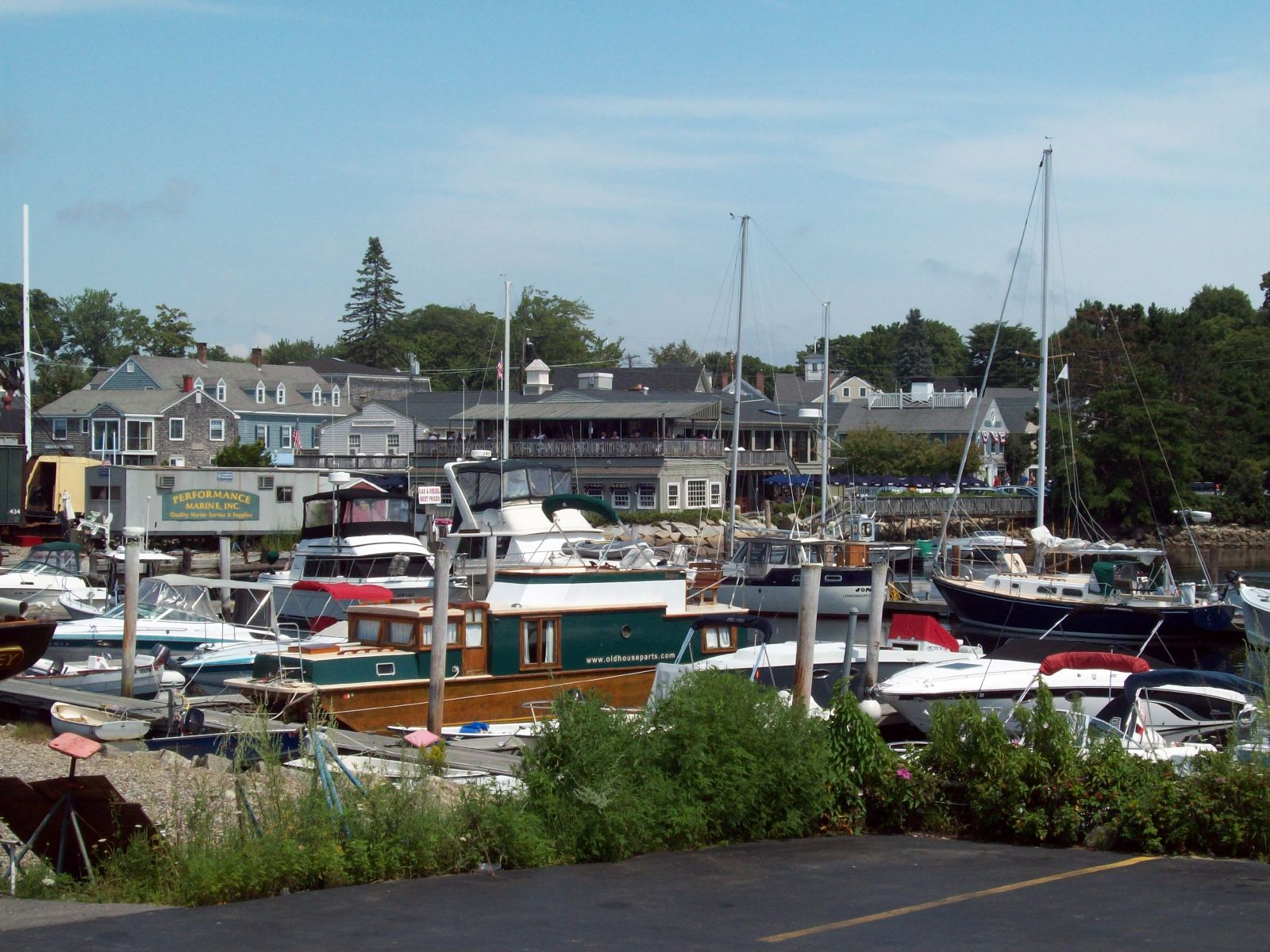
The harbor

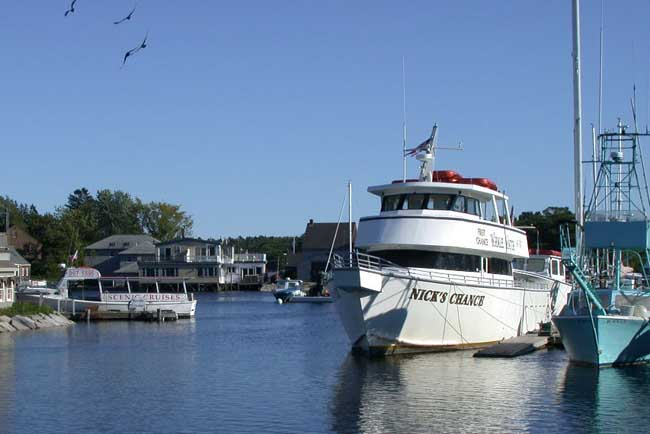
Boats on the Kennebunk River

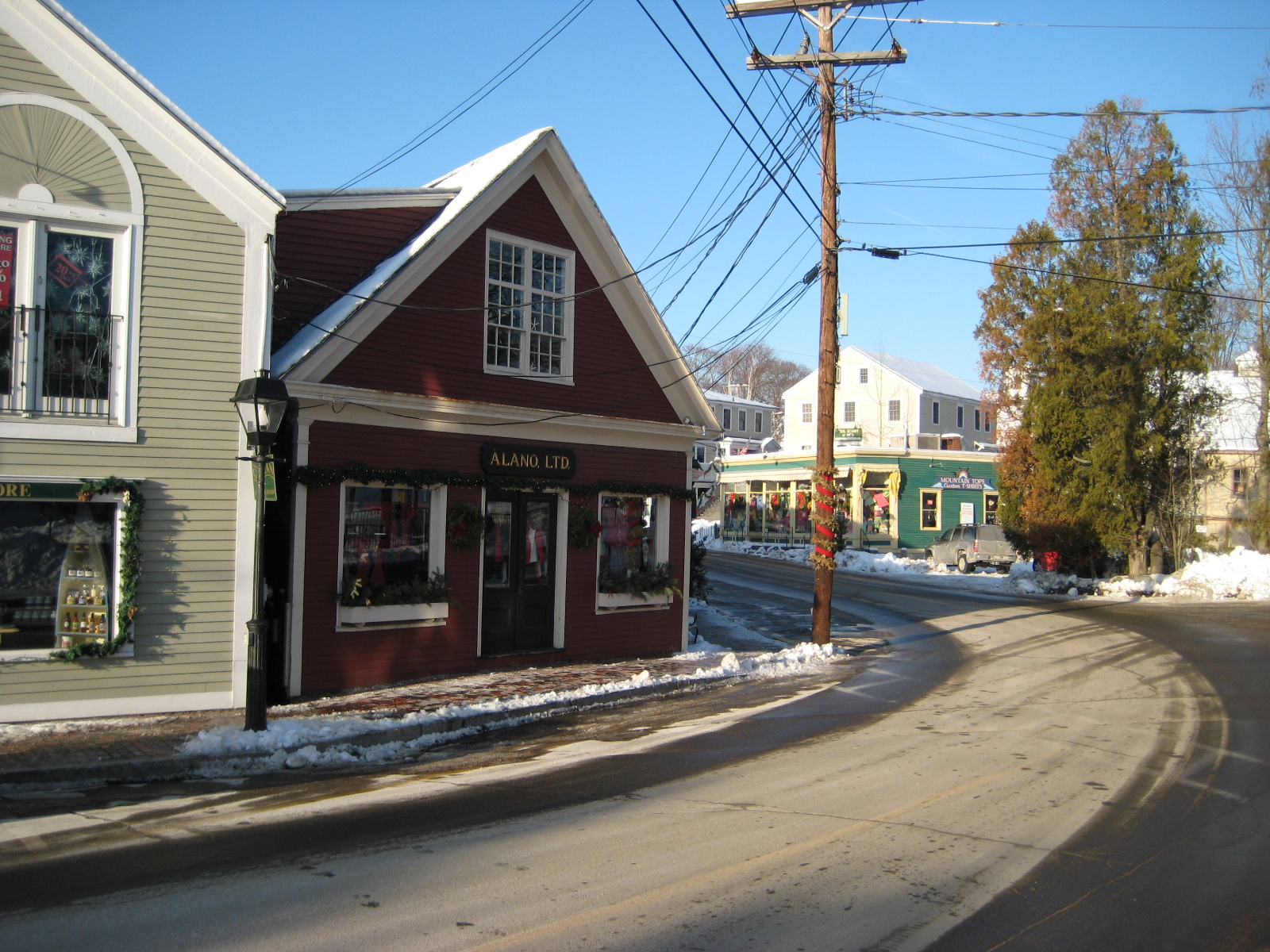
Businesses on Ocean Avenue

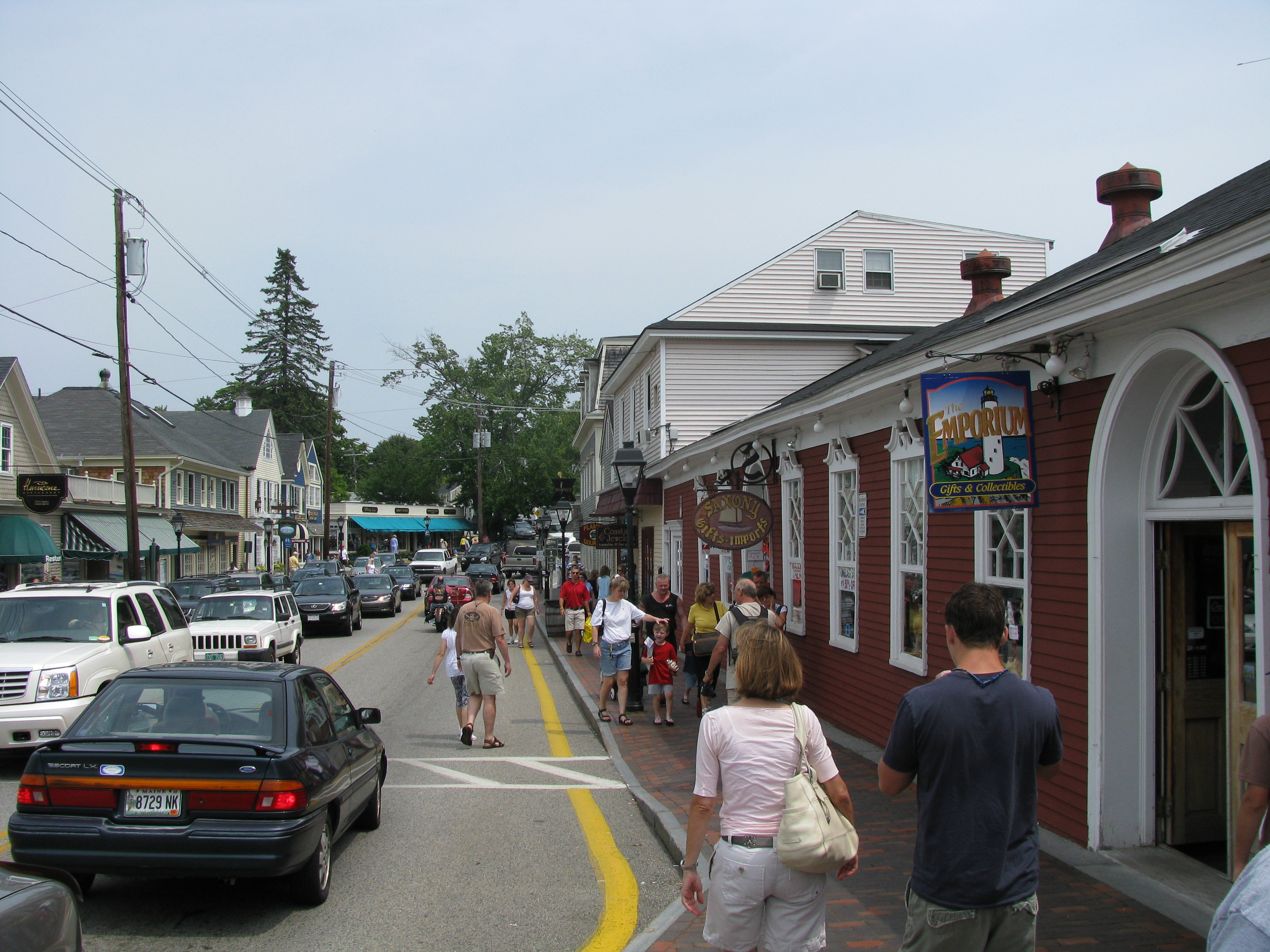
View of Dock Square

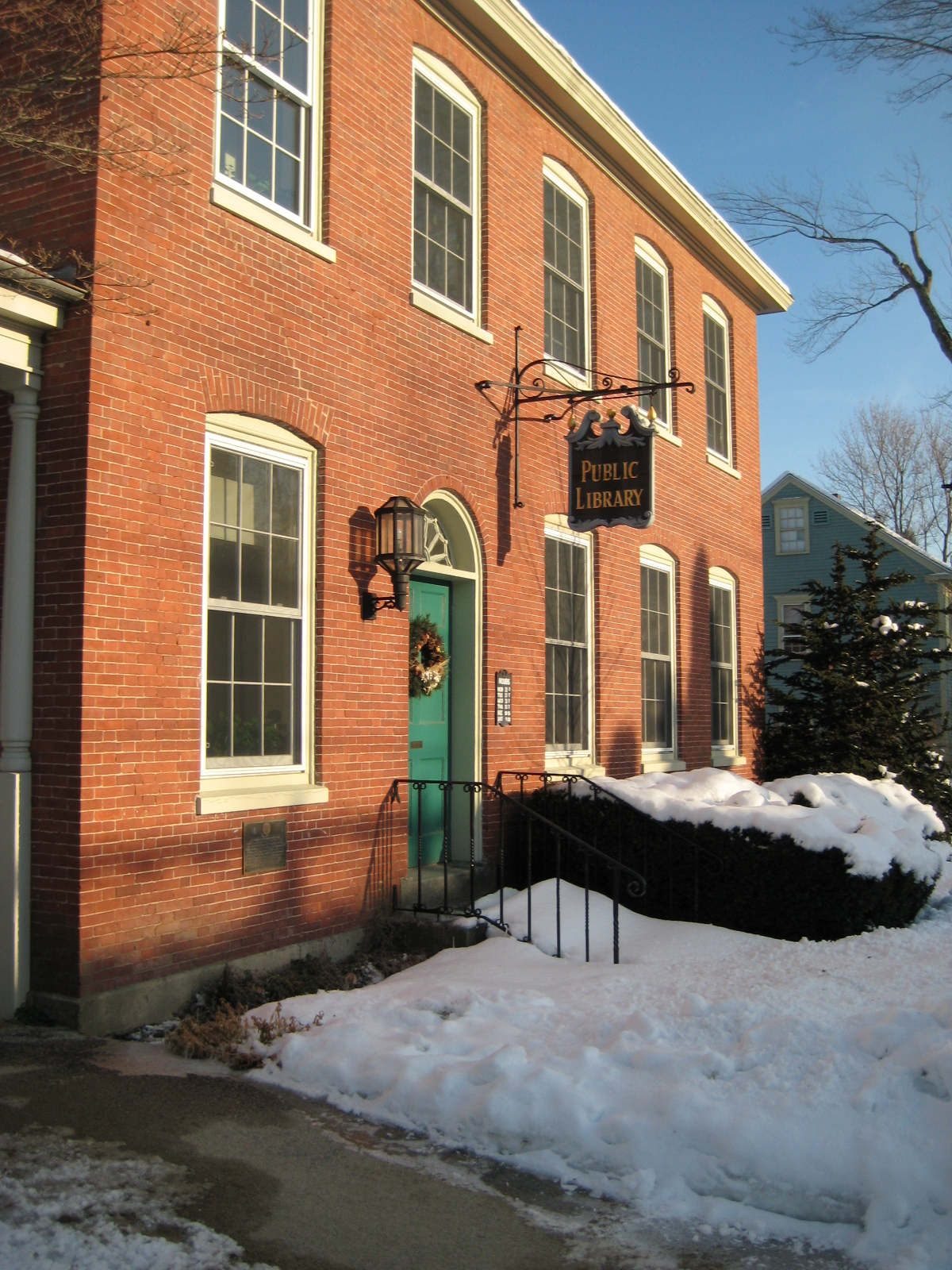
Louis T. Graves Memorial Public Library

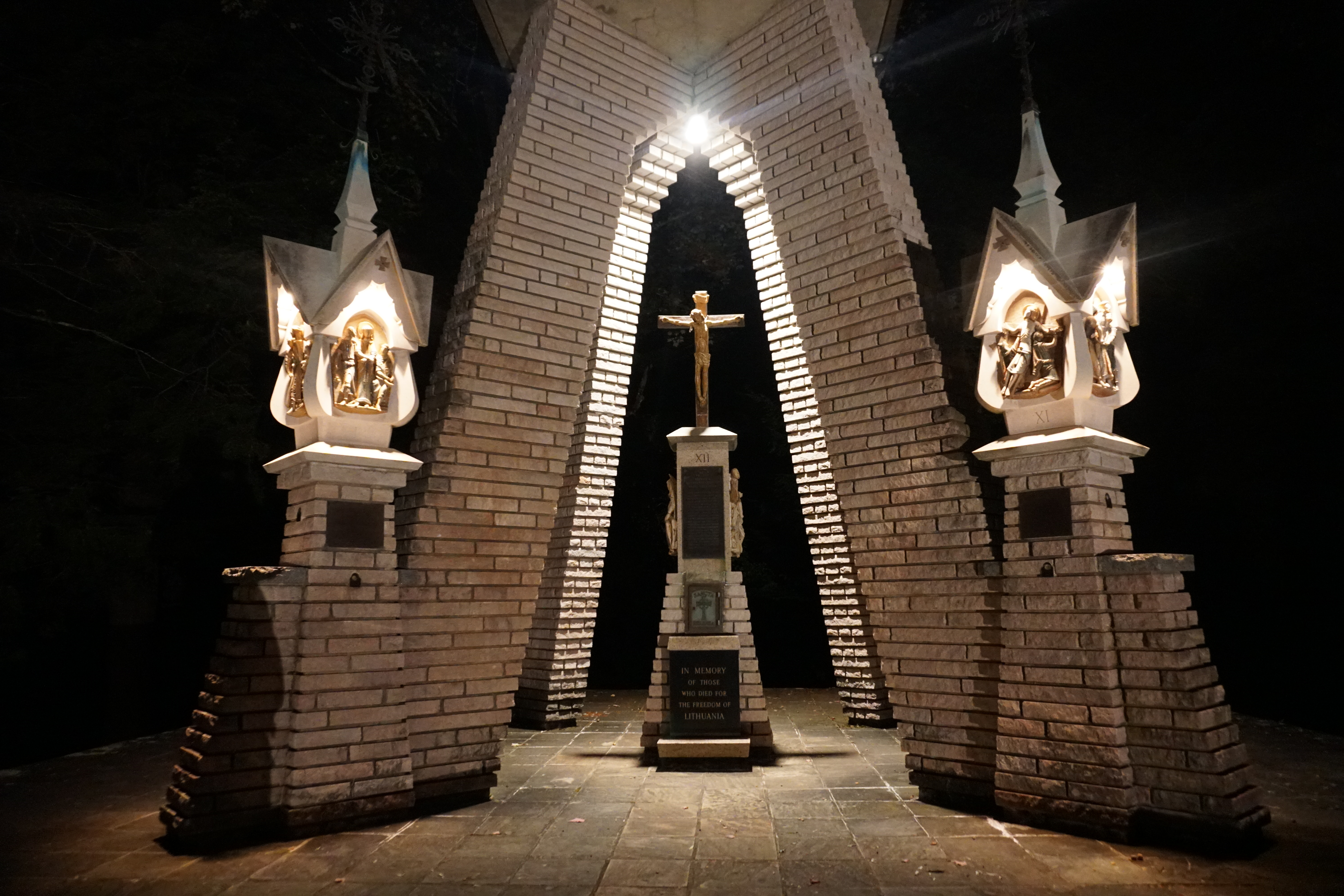
Monument dedicated to Lithuanians who died fighting for Lithuania's freedom

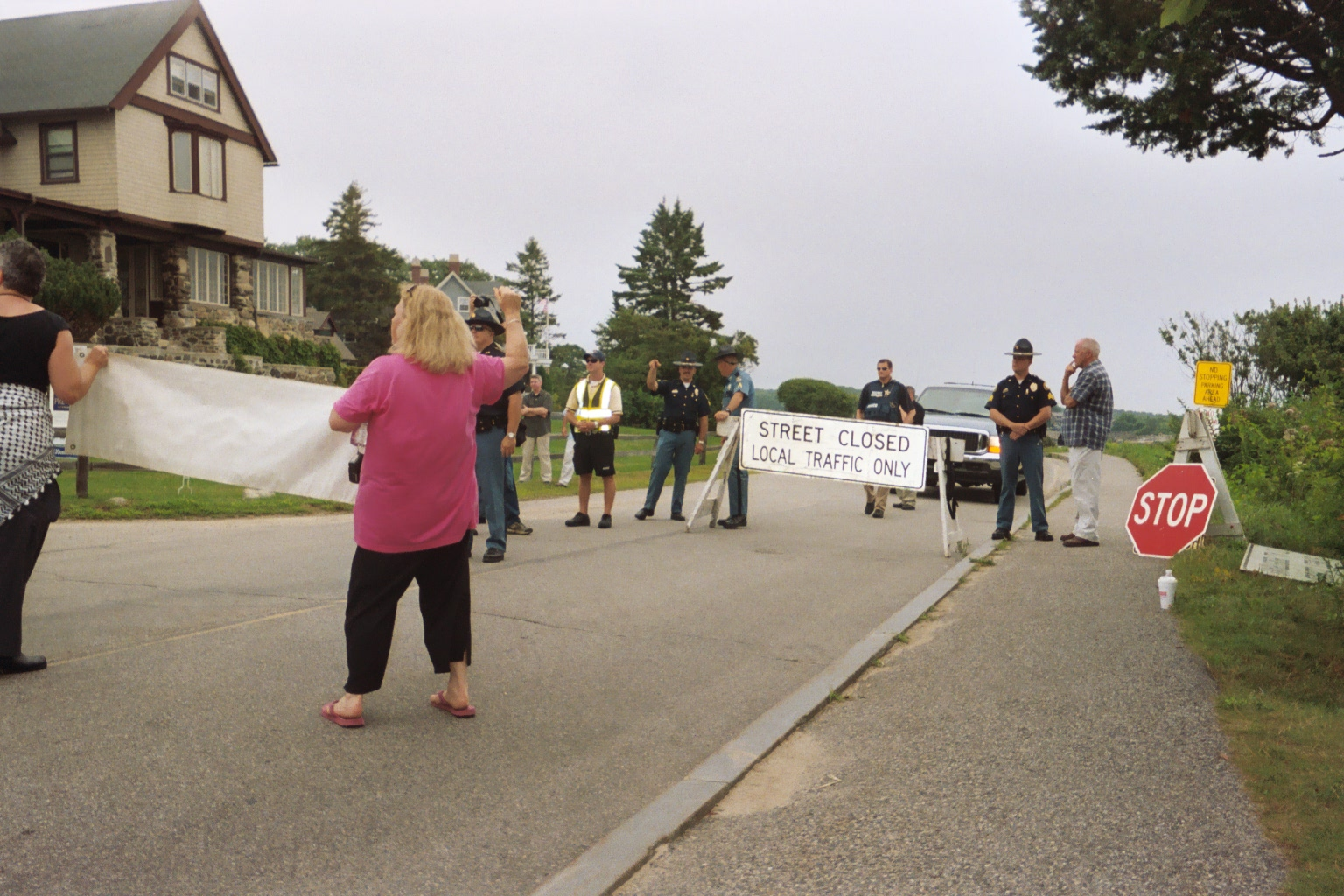
Protestors on Ocean Ave. near the Bush Compound, in 2008

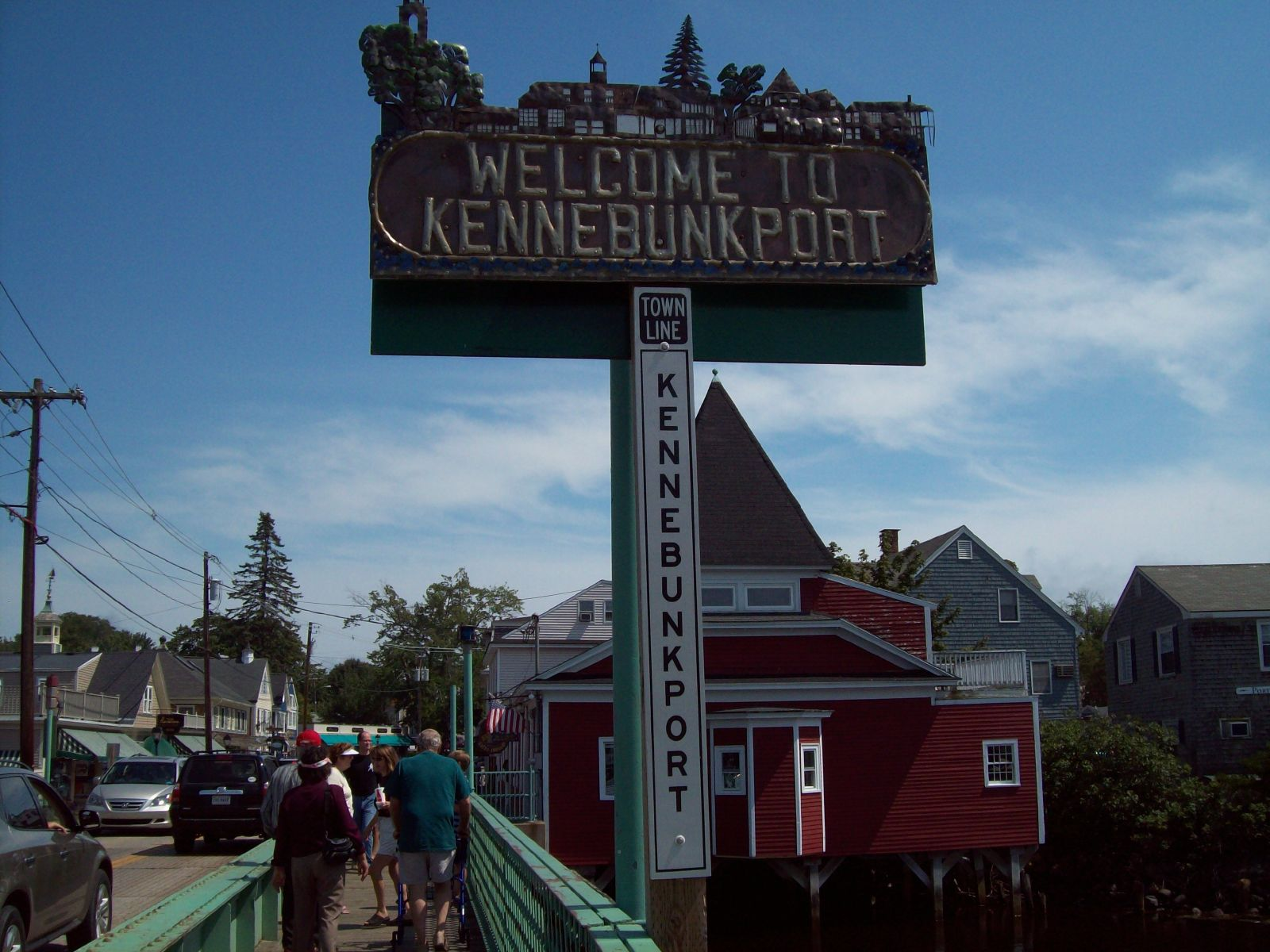
Kennebunkport welcome sign and town line, in 2008

== Notable people ==
- Margaret Deland, novelist
- Dan Goodwin, building, rock, and sports climber
- Frank Handlen, painter
- Garnet Hathaway, professional ice hockey player
- Joshua Herrick, US congressman
- Dick McCabe, racing driver and champion
- Jane Morgan, singer
- Shiloh Pepin, Sirenomelia patient with legs fused
- George Clement Perkins, 14th governor of California
- Kenneth Roberts, author
- Booth Tarkington, novelist and dramatist
- George Herbert Walker, banker and grandfather of US President George H. W. Bush
- Neil Clark Warren, online dating service chairman

== In popular culture ==
Kennebunkport was featured in the 2003 filming of the film Empire Falls by Maine author Richard Russo, with a downtown book shop making a notable appearance. Robin Wright appeared on set in Kennebunkport.

Other films with scenes shot in Kennebunkport include Lost Boundaries (1949), The Man Who Knew Bush (2004 documentary), The Living Wake (2007), 41 (2012 documentary) and US Route 1-ME (2012). My Husband's Double Life was partially set in the town, but filmed in Toronto.
