= John Smith =

John Smith is a common name. It is also commonly used as a placeholder name and pseudonym, and is sometimes used in the United States, and the United Kingdom or the internet as a term for an average person.

For uses of John Smith that are not people, see § Other uses.

Notable people with the name include:

== People ==
=== Academics ===
- John Smith (astronomer) (1711–1795), Lowndean Professor of Astronomy and Master of Caius
- John Smith (anatomist and chemist) (1721–1797), professor of anatomy and chemistry at the University of Oxford, 1767–1797
- John Smith (antiquary) (1747–1807), Scottish antiquary and Gaelic scholar
- John Blair Smith (1764–1799), president of Union College, New York
- John Smith (professor of languages) (1752–1809), professor of languages at Dartmouth College
- John Augustine Smith (1782–1865), president of the College of William and Mary, 1814–1826
- John Smith (botanist) (1798–1888), curator of Kew Gardens
- J. Lawrence Smith (chemist) (1818–1883), American doctor and chemist
- John Smith (dentist) (1825–1910), founder of Edinburgh's School of Dentistry
- John Campbell Smith (1828–1914), Scottish writer, advocate and Sheriff-Substitute of Forfarshire
- John Donnell Smith (1829–1928), biologist and taxonomist
- John McGarvie Smith (1844–1918), Australian metallurgist and bacteriologist
- John Bernhardt Smith (1858–1912), American entomologist
- John Alexander Smith (1863–1939), British Idealist philosopher
- John Merlin Powis Smith (1866–1932), English-born, American orientalist and biblical scholar
- John E. Sharwood Smith (1919–2007), English professor of classics
- John Edwin Smith (1921–2009), American philosopher
- John Cyril Smith (1922–2003), leading authority on English criminal law
- John Derek Smith (1924–2003), Cambridge molecular biologist
- John Smith (sociologist) (1927–2002), English sociologist
- John D. Smith (born 1946), indologist at the University of Cambridge
- John H. Smith (mathematician), Boston College educator (retired 2005)

=== Arts ===
==== Graphic arts ====
- John Smith (engraver) (1652–1742), English mezzotint engraver
- John Warwick Smith (1749–1831), British watercolour landscape painter and illustrator
- John Raphael Smith (1751–1812), English mezzotint engraver and painter
- John Thomas Smith (engraver) (1766–1833), draughtsman, engraver and antiquarian
- John Rubens Smith (1775–1849), London-born painter, printmaker and art instructor who worked in the US
- John Smith (art historian) (1781–1855), British art dealer
- John Orrin Smith (1799–1843), English wood engraver
- John Rowson Smith (1810–1864), American panorama painter
- John Moyr Smith (1839–1912), British architect, artist and designer
- John Noel Smith (born 1952), Irish artist

==== Literature ====
- John Berryman (1914–1972), originally John Allyn Smith, American poet
- John Smith (English poet) (1662–1717), English poet and playwright
- John Frederick Smith (1806–1890), English novelist
- John G. Smith (poet) (died 1891), Scottish poet
- John Smith (Canadian poet) (1927–2018)
- John N. Smith (born 1943), Canadian film director and screenwriter
- John Warner Smith (born 1952), American poet and educator
- John Smith (comics writer) (born 1967), British comics writer

==== Music ====
- John Christopher Smith (1712–1795), English composer
- John Stafford Smith (1750–1836), composer of the tune for "The Star-Spangled Banner"
- John Kelday Smith (1834–1889), Scottish bellhanger and songwriter
- John F. Smith (musician) (born 1950), British musician and trade unionist
- John Smith (folk musician), English contemporary folk musician and recording artist

==== Other arts ====
- John Moyr Smith (1839–1912), British architect, artist and designer
- John Smith (actor) (1931–1995), American actor
- John N. Smith (born 1943), Canadian film director and screenwriter
- John Smith (English filmmaker) (born 1952), avant-garde filmmaker
- John F. Smith (writer), American soap opera writer and producer
- John Douglas Smith (born 1966), Canadian sound editor
- John Smith (comedian), British comedian, actor and performer

=== Business ===
- John Smith (vegetarian) (c. 1795–1870), English banker and vegetarianism activist
- John Smith (banker) (1797–1866), Scottish banker and philanthropist, working in England
- John Russell Smith (1810–1894), English bookseller and bibliographer
- John J. Smith (1820–1906), African-American abolitionist, Underground Railroad contributor and politician
- John Smith (brewer) (1824–1879), Tadcaster brewery founder in North Yorkshire, UK
- John K. Smith (1805–1845), American pharmacist and businessman, founder of the company which would later become SmithKline, a major pharmaceutical company
- John L. Smith (pharmaceutical executive) (1889–1950), German-born American chemist, pharmaceutical executive and Major League Baseball team owner
- John F. Smith Jr. (born 1938), former chairman and chief executive officer of General Motors
- John Smith (BBC executive) (born 1957), former chief executive officer of BBC Worldwide Ltd.

=== Crime ===
- John Smith (housebreaker) (1661–after 1727), London housebreaker who evaded hanging thrice and was eventually transported to Virginia
- John Smith (died 1835) (1795–1835), one of the last two Englishmen who were hanged for sodomy in 1835
- John Eldon Smith (1930–1983), convicted of the murders of Ronald and Juanita Akins
- John Smith (murderer) (born 1951), American convicted murderer

=== Law ===
- John Witherspoon Smith (1778–1829), American lawyer
- John Sidney Smith (legal writer) (1804–1871), English legal writer
- John William Smith (legal writer) (1809–1845), English barrister and legal writer
- John Smalman Smith, (1847–1914), British judge in the Colony of Lagos
- John Lewis Smith Jr. (1912–1992), US federal judge
- John Smith (police officer) (born 1938), British police officer, Deputy Commissioner of the Metropolitan Police, 1991–1995
- John Smith (South African judge) (born 1958)
- Jack Smith (lawyer) (born 1969), American lawyer

=== Medicine ===
- John Gordon Smith (surgeon) (1792–1833), Scottish surgeon and professor of medical jurisprudence
- John Smith (physician) (c. 1800–1879), Scottish physician specialising in treating the insane
- John Alexander Smith (physician) (1818–1883), Scottish physician, antiquarian, archaeologist and ornithologist

=== Military ===
- John Smith (banneret) (1616–1644), Englishman who supported the Royalist cause in the English Civil War
- John Kilby Smith (1752–1842), Continental Army brigadier general during the American Revolutionary War
- John Smith (British Army officer, born 1754) (1754–1837), British artillery officer in the American Revolutionary War, later promoted to major-general
- John Smith (United States Navy officer) (1780–1815), US Navy captain
- Frederick Smith (British Army officer, born 1790) (John Mark Frederick Smith, 1790–1874), British general and colonel-commandant of the Royal Engineers
- John Smith (sergeant) (1814–1864), soldier in the Bengal Sappers and Miners, and Indian Mutiny Victoria Cross recipient
- John E. Smith (general) (1816–1897), Swiss emigrant, Union general during the Civil War
- John Smith (private) (1822–1866), soldier in the 1st Madras (European) Fusiliers and Indian Mutiny Victoria Cross recipient
- John Smith (Medal of Honor, born 1826) (1826–1907), American Civil War sailor and Medal of Honor recipient
- John Smith (Medal of Honor, born 1831) (1831–?), American Civil War sailor and Medal of Honor recipient
- John Smith (Medal of Honor, born 1854) (1854–?), US Navy sailor and Medal of Honor recipient
- John Manners Smith (1864–1920), British Indian Army lieutenant awarded the Victoria Cross, later promoted to lieutenant-colonel
- John Smith, the nom de guerre adopted by Gopal Mukund Huddar (1902–1981) during the Spanish Civil War
- John Smith (flying ace) (1914–1972), US Marine Corps flying ace and Medal of Honor recipient
- John Malcolm Smith (1922–1981), US Navy World War II flying ace

=== Politics ===
==== Australia ====
- John Smith (New South Wales politician, born 1811) (1811–1895), pastoralist and member of the New South Wales Legislative Council
- John Smith (Victoria politician) (1816–1879), mayor of Melbourne
- John Smith (New South Wales politician, born 1821) (1821–1885), Scottish/Australian professor and member of the New South Wales Legislative Council
- John Samuel Smith (1841–1882), pastoralist and member of the New South Wales Legislative Assembly (Wellington)
- John Gordon Smith (politician) (1863–1921), member of the Queensland Legislative Council
- John Henry Smith (politician) (1881–1953), member of the Legislative Assembly of Western Australia

==== Canada ====
- John David Smith (Upper Canada politician) (1786–1849), businessman and politician in Upper Canada
- John Shuter Smith (c. 1813–1871), lawyer and politician in Canada West
- John Smith (Manitoba politician) (1817–1889), English-born farmer and politician in Manitoba
- John Smith (Peel MPP) (1831–1909), Scottish-born Ontario businessman and politician
- John Smith (Kent MPP), member of the 1st Ontario Legislative Assembly, 1867–1871
- John W. Y. Smith (1869–1936), member of the Legislative Assembly of New Brunswick
- John Smith (Ontario MP) (1894–1977), member of the Canadian House of Commons
- Jack Smith (politician) (John Eachern Smith, 1901–1967), Canadian politician and newspaper editor
- John James Smith (1912–1987), member of the Canadian House of Commons
- John Donald Smith (1919–1997), Canadian politician in the Legislative Assembly of British Columbia
- John Roxburgh Smith (1938–2018), Canadian politician in the Legislative Assembly of Ontario
- John David Smith (Ontario politician), Canadian politician in the Legislative Assembly of Ontario in 1975

==== United Kingdom ====
- John Smith alias Dyer (1498/99–1571), member of parliament (MP) for Ipswich
- John Smith (High Sheriff of Kent) (1557–1608), MP for Aylesbury and Hythe
- John Smith (steward of Berkeley) (1567–1640), English genealogical antiquary and politician
- John Smith (explorer) (1580–1631), helped found the Virginia Colony and became Colonial Governor of Virginia
- Sir John Smith of Grothill (c. 1600–c. 1675), Scottish landowner, merchant and Lord Provost of Edinburgh
- John Smith (Cavalier, born 1608) (1608–1657), English politician who sat in the House of Commons, 1640–1644
- John Smith (Chancellor of the Exchequer) (1655/56–1723), English Speaker of the House of Commons, 1705–1708
- John Smith (English judge) (1657–1726), Justice of Common Pleas in Ireland until 1702, then Baron of the Exchequer
- John Smith (Southampton MP), MP for Southampton from 1698 to 1700
- John Smith (Bath MP) (1727–1775), MP for Bath
- John Smith (Wendover MP) (1767–1842), member of Parliament for Wendover
- John Spencer Smith (1769–1845), British diplomat, politician, and writer
- John Smith (Deputy Governor of Anguilla) (died 1776)
- John Benjamin Smith (1796–1879), British Liberal MP for Stirling Burghs 1847–1852 and Stockport 1852–1874
- John Abel Smith (1802–1871), British Member of Parliament for Chichester and Midhurst
- John Smith (Conservative politician) (1923–2007), MP for the Cities of London and Westminster, founded the Landmark Trust
- John Hilary Smith (born 1928), colonial governor and administrator
- John Smith, Baron Kirkhill (1930–2023), life peer in the House of Lords
- John Smith (Labour Party leader) (1938–1994), leader of the British Labour Party
- John Smith (Welsh politician) (born 1951), Welsh politician and Labour Party member of Parliament

==== United States ====
- John Smith (President of Rhode Island) (died 1663), colonial president (governor) of Rhode Island
- John Smith (Virginia burgess) (1620–1663), Virginia colonial politician
- John Smith (Ohio politician, died 1824) (c. 1735–1824), US senator from Ohio
- John Smith (Virginia representative) (1750–1836), US representative from Virginia's 3rd Congressional District
- John Smith (New York politician, born 1752) (1752–1816), US senator from New York
- John Cotton Smith (1765–1845), eighth Governor of Connecticut
- John Smith (Vermont politician) (1789–1858), US representative from Vermont's 4th Congressional District
- John Speed Smith (1792–1854), US representative from Kentucky
- John T. Smith (politician) (1801–1864), US representative from Pennsylvania's 3rd Congressional District, 1843–1845
- John B. Smith (Wisconsin politician) (1811–1879)
- John Derby Smith (1812–1884), minister, physician, and Massachusetts state legislator
- John Armstrong Smith (1814–1892), US representative from Ohio
- J. Lawrence Smith (New York politician) (1816–1889), New York lawyer, assemblyman, district attorney, county judge
- J. Gregory Smith (1818–1891), governor of Vermont
- John Hugh Smith (1819–1870), three-time mayor of Nashville, Tennessee between 1845 and 1865
- J. Hyatt Smith (1824–1886), US representative from New York's 3rd Congressional District
- John Quincy Smith (1824–1901), US representative from Ohio's 3rd Congressional District
- John Lyman Smith (1828–1898), member of the 2nd Utah Territorial Legislature
- John Peter Smith (Texas politician) (1831–1901), known as the 'Father of Fort Worth'
- John Y. T. Smith (1831–1903), three-time member of Arizona Territorial Legislature
- John C. Smith (politician) (1832–1910), Lieutenant Governor of Illinois
- John Montgomery Smith (1834–1903), Wisconsin politician
- John B. Smith (Washington politician) (1837–1917), Canadian-born American politician
- John Butler Smith (1838–1914), 52nd governor of New Hampshire
- John B. D. Smith (died 1839), American politician
- John E. Smith (New York politician) (1843–1907)
- John Day Smith (1845–1933), Minnesota politician, lawyer, and judge
- John Walter Smith (1845–1925), 44th governor of Maryland
- John Ambler Smith (1847–1892), US representative from Virginia
- John A. Smith (Mississippi politician) (1847–?), American state senator in Mississippi
- John Peter Smith (Montana politician) (1848–?), mayor of Missoula, Montana
- John M. C. Smith (1853–1923), US representative from Michigan's 3rd Congressional District
- J. H. Smith (mayor) (1858–1956), mayor of Everett, Washington and co-founder of Anchorage, Alaska
- John M. Smith (politician, born 1872) (1872–1947), American businessman and politician
- John Smith (Maine politician) (1874–1936), mayor of Saco, Maine
- John W. Smith (Detroit mayor) (1882–1942), politician from Detroit
- John Lee Smith (1894–1963), Lieutenant Governor of Texas
- John R. Smith (agriculture commissioner) (fl. 1898–1899), North Carolina politician
- J. Joseph Smith (1904–1980), US representative from Connecticut and Federal judge
- J. Clay Smith Jr. (1942–2018), American lawyer and educator
- John Arthur Smith (1941–2024), Democratic member of the New Mexico Senate
- John R. Smith (politician, born 1945), Louisiana state senator
- John Robert Smith, mayor of Meridian, Mississippi
- John Smith (Washington politician) (born 1973), American politician

==== Other countries ====
- John Hope Smith (c. 1787–1831), governor of colonial Ghana, 1817–22
- John William Smith (politician) (1792–1845), Republic of Texas politician and mayor of San Antonio
- J. Valentine Smith (John Valentine Smith, 1824–1895), New Zealand politician

=== Religion ===
- John Smith (bishop of Llandaff) (died 1479), Welsh bishop
- John Smith (Platonist) (1618–1652), one of the founders of the Cambridge Platonists
- John Smith (Unitarian) (fl. 1648–1727), Unitarian writer
- John Smith (priest, born 1659) (1659–1715), English editor of Bede
- John Smith (bishop of Killala and Achonry) (died 1680), Irish Anglican priest
- John Smith (uncle of Joseph Smith) (1781–1854), Presiding Patriarch and member of the First Presidency of the Church of Jesus Christ of Latter-day Saints
- John Smith (Restoration Movement) (1784–1868), early Restoration Movement leader
- John Smith (missionary) (1790–1824), English missionary in Demerara
- John Smith (priest, born 1799) (1799–1870), first person to transcribe the Diary of Samuel Pepys
- John Smith (nephew of Joseph Smith) (1832–1911), Presiding Patriarch of the Church of Jesus Christ of Latter-day Saints
- John Henry Smith (1848–1911), apostle in the Church of Jesus Christ of Latter-day Saints
- John Smith (moderator) (1854–1927), moderator of the General Assembly of the Church of Scotland in 1922
- John Taylor Smith (1860–1938), Anglican bishop of Sierra Leone
- John Smith (archdeacon of Llandaff), Welsh Anglican priest
- John Smith (archdeacon of Wiltshire) (1933–2000), Anglican priest
- John M. Smith (bishop) (1935–2019), American Roman Catholic bishop
- John H. Smith (bishop) (1939–2012), American Episcopal prelate, Bishop of the Episcopal Diocese of West Virginia, 1989–1999
- John Smith (God's Squad) (died 2019), Australian founder of the God's Squad motorcycle club

=== Sports ===
==== American football ====
- Clipper Smith (American football, born 1904) (1904–1973), player and coach
- John Smith (tackle), in 1945
- John L. Smith (born 1948), American college football coach
- John Smith (placekicker) (born 1949), former New England Patriots kicker
- John Smith (running back) (born 1954)
- J. T. Smith (American football) (John Thomas Smith, born 1955), former professional American football player
- JuJu Smith-Schuster (born 1996 as John Smith), wide receiver
- L. J. Smith (born 1980), player

==== Association football ====
- John Smith (sportsman, born 1855) (1855–1934), Scottish footballer and rugby union player
- John Smith (footballer, born 1865) (1865–1911), Scottish football inside-right born in Kilmarnock, Ayrshire
- Jackie Smith (footballer) (born John Smith, 1886–1916), English footballer for Hull City
- Jack Smith (footballer, born 1898) (born John William Smith, 1898–1977), English international footballer born in Whitburn, County Durham
- John Smith (footballer, born 1898) (1898–?), Scottish international footballer for Ayr United and Middlesbrough
- John Richard Smith (footballer, born 1898) (1898–1986), English footballer
- John Smith (footballer, born 1901), English footballer born in Eccleshill, West Riding of Yorkshire
- Ted Smith (footballer, born 1914) (born John Edward Smith, 1914–1989), English football player and manager born in Grays, Essex
- John Smith (football chairman) (1920–1995), chairman of Liverpool (1973–90)
- John Smith (footballer, born 1921) (1921–?), English footballer born in Stoke-on-Trent, Staffordshire
- John Smith (footballer, born 1927) (1927–2000), English footballer for Liverpool and Torquay United
- John Smith (footballer, born 1939) (1939–1988), English footballer born in Shoreditch, London
- John Smith (footballer, born 1944), Welsh footballer born in Johnstown, Wrexham
- John Smith (footballer, born 1970), English football full back born in Liverpool
- John Smith (footballer, born 1971), English football striker born in Wigan, Lancashire
- John Smith (inside-left), English footballer for Port Vale 1932–33
- John Smith (1930s Gillingham footballer), English footballer who also played for Exeter City and Maidstone United

==== Baseball ====
- John Smith (1880s first baseman) (1858–1899), first baseman in 1882
- Phenomenal Smith (John Francis Smith, 1864–1952), American baseball pitcher and manager
- John Smith (shortstop), 1873–75
- John Smith (1930s first baseman) (1906–1982), first baseman in 1931
- Ford Smith (born John Ford Smith, 1919–1983), American Negro leagues pitcher
- John G. Smith (coach) (1924–1998), American college baseball, football and basketball coach

==== Basketball ====
- John Smith (basketball, born 1944), American basketball player known for his American Basketball Association career
- John Smith (basketball, born 1969), American college basketball coach
- John Smith (basketball, born 1984), American basketball player best known for his college career at Winona State University

==== Cricket ====
- John Smith (cricketer, born 1833) (1833–1909), Lancashire and Yorkshire cricketer
- John Smith (cricketer, born 1835) (1835–1889), English cricketer
- John Smith (Derbyshire cricketer) (1841–1898), English cricketer, played for Derbyshire
- John Smith (cricketer, born 1843) (1843–1873), English cricketer, played for Cambridgeshire 1863–72
- John Smith (cricketer, born 1882) (1882–1959), English cricketer, played for Leicestershire 1921
- John Smith (cricketer, born 1919) (1919–1999), New Zealand cricketer
- John Smith (cricketer, born 1924) (1924–1991), English cricketer, played for Leicestershire 1950–1955
- John Smith (cricketer, born 1936) (1936–2020), Australian cricketer
- John Smith (New Zealand cricketer) (born 1960), also known as Campbell Smith

==== Rugby ====
- John Sidney Smith (rugby union) (1860–?), Wales rugby union international
- Johnny Smith (rugby union) (1922–1974), New Zealand rugby player, baker, soldier, and sportsman
- J. V. Smith (John Vincent Smith, 1926–2021), English rugby player and RFU president
- John Smith (rugby union, born 1926) (1926–2006), Irish rugby player
- John Smith (rugby league) (fl. 1975–1980), New Zealand international

==== Other sports ====
- John Smith (Canadian rower) (1899–1973), Canadian rower at the 1924 Olympics
- John Suttie Smith (1905–1975), Scottish Olympic runner
- John Smith (Australian footballer) (born 1933), footballer for St Kilda
- John Smith (Zambian wrestler) (born 1942), Zambian freestyle wrestler at the 1964 Olympics
- John Smith (sprinter) (born 1950), American sprint athlete and now coach
- John Smith (racing driver, born 1952), Australian racing driver
- John Smith (Down Gaelic footballer), won the 1961 All-Ireland Senior Football Championship final
- John Smith (American wrestler) (born 1965), two-time Olympic gold medalist
- J. T. Smith (wrestler) (born 1967), American professional wrestler
- John Smith (Offaly Gaelic footballer), won the 1971 and 1972 All-Ireland Senior Football Championship finals
- John Smith (racing driver, born 1975), American stock car racing driver
- Johnboy Smith (John Charles Smith, born 1989), British parathlete and wheelchair racer
- John Smith (South African rower) (born 1990), South African rower at the 2012 Olympics

=== Other fields ===
- John Smith (settler) (c. 1595–c. 1649), founding settler of Providence Plantation (later Rhode Island)
- Sir John Smith, 1st Baronet (1744–1807), antiquarian of London and of the Royal Society, High Sheriff of Dorset
- John Smith (clockmaker) (1770–1816), Scottish clockmaker
- John Smith (architect) (1781–1852), Scottish architect
- John Smith (Native American) (1785–1922), reputed to have died at the age of 137
- John Smith (abolitionist) (1797–1886), American industrialist and abolitionist
- John Smith (1813–1886), clockmaker, founder of Smith of Derby Group
- John Chaloner Smith (1827–1895), Irish civil engineer and writer on mezzotints
- John Smith (hereditary chief) (c. 1836–1924), 1800s Cree Chief and Treaty Six signatory in Saskatchewan
- John Brown Smith (1837–1917), American author, shorthand developer, utopianist, tax resister
- John Baptist Smith (1843–1923), invented and helped build a lantern system of naval signaling
- John Smith Murdoch (1862–1945), Scottish architect
- J. E. Smith (c. 1862/1863–1912), English trade union leader
- John Chabot Smith (1915–2002), American journalist and author
- John Henry Smith (reporter), American sports journalist, active 2000s

== Fictional characters ==
- Ranger Smith (John Francis Smith), a park ranger in Yogi Bear cartoons
- J. Wesley Smith, in cartoons by Burr Shafer (1899–1965)
- John Smith (Kyon), Kyon's alias in the novels and animations of the Haruhi Suzumiya series
- John "Hannibal" Smith, in The A-Team
- John Smith, the human identity of Red Tornado, a fictional superhero appearing in DC Comics
- John Smith, also known as "Number Four", the protagonist of the young adult novel I Am Number Four
- John Smith, the protagonist in the film Last Man Standing, played by Bruce Willis
- John Smith, a protagonist in the film Mr. & Mrs. Smith, played by Brad Pitt
- John Smith (Doctor Who), an alias of the Doctor in Doctor Who media
- John Smith (Jericho), in the TV series Jericho
- Agent Smith, also known as John Smith, the main villain in The Matrix franchise
- John Smith, a Nazi SS-Obergruppenführer in the television series The Man in the High Castle
- John Smith, the main villain in the movie Hitman: Agent 47, played by Zachary Quinto
- Johnny Smith (Dead Zone), main character in Stephen King's novel The Dead Zone and its subsequent adaptations
- John Smith, lead character of the film John Smith (film)
- John Smith, the unknown everyday man, subject of Ode to J. Smith, a Travis album

== Other uses ==
=== Arts and entertainment ===
- "John Smith", a 2008 episode of TV series This American Life
- John Smith (film), a 1922 silent film
- John Smith, an 1889 operetta by Alfred Caldicott
- John Smith, an 1878 novel by Harriet Cradock

=== Ships ===
- John Smith, wrecked in June 1861
- John Smith, wrecked in February 1873
- John Smith, launched in 1881

=== Miscellaneous ===
- John Smith Field, a baseball venue in Sacramento, California
- John Smith's Brewery, founded in 1758 by John Smith at Tadcaster, North Yorkshire, England
- John Smith & Son, Glasgow-based bookseller
- John Smith & Sons, part of Smith of Derby Group, a group of clockmaking companies
- John Smith House (disambiguation)

== See also ==
- Joe Bloggs
- John Doe
- Sir John Smith (disambiguation)
- Johnny Smith (disambiguation)
- Jonathan Smith (disambiguation)
- Jack Smith (disambiguation)
- John Smyth (disambiguation)
- John Smythe (disambiguation)
- Johann Schmidt (disambiguation)
- Jan Smit (disambiguation)
- John Smit (born 1978), South African rugby player
- Juan Smith (born 1981), South African rugby player
