= John Smyth =

John Smyth may refer to:

- John Smyth (merchant) (c. 1500–1556), Bristol businessman and mayor
- John Smyth (English theologian) (1554–1612), considered the earliest Baptist
- John Smyth (Anglican priest) (died 1704), Anglican archdeacon in Ireland
- John Smyth (Catholic priest) (1824–1870)
- John Smyth (architect) (died 1775), Irish architect and engineer
- John Smyth (Master of Pembroke) (1744–1809), clergyman and Master of Pembroke College, Oxford
- John Ferdinand Smyth Stuart (1745–1814), until 1793 John Ferdinand Smyth, Scottish physician, soldier, and author
- John Smyth (1748–1811), British member of parliament for Pontefract
- John Smyth (sculptor) (c. 1773–1840), Irish sculptor
- John Henry Smyth (1780–1822), British member of parliament for Cambridge University
- John Smyth (minister) (1796–1860), Scottish minister in the Free Church of Scotland
- John Rowland Smyth (1803–1873), British soldier
- John George Smyth (1815–1869), Conservative member of parliament for the City of York
- John Smyth (Catholic priest) (1824–1870), vicar general in South Australia
- John Henry Greville Smyth 1836–1901), English naturalist and collector
- John Paterson Smyth (1852–1932), Canadian Anglican priest, Archdeacon of Montreal
- Sir John Smyth, 1st Baronet (1893–1983), Victoria Cross recipient, British MP and Privy Counsellor
- John Smyth (snooker referee) (1928–2007)
- John Smyth (barrister) (1941–2018), British QC, Christian lay minister, and child abuser
- John Smyth (footballer) (born 1970), Irish former professional footballer

== See also ==
- John Smythe (disambiguation)
- John Smith (disambiguation)
