= John S. Smith =

John S. Smith may refer to:

- John Shuter Smith (died 1871), Canadian lawyer
- John Sidney Smith (legal writer) (1804–1871), English legal writer
- John Sidney Smith (rugby union) (1860–?), English rugby union forward
- John Speed Smith (1792–1854), American politician
- John Stafford Smith (1750–1836), British composer
- John Samuel Smith (1841–1882), New South Wales politician
- John Spencer Smith (1769–1845), British diplomat, politician and writer
- John Smalman Smith, British judge in the Colony of Lagos
