= Annie Rothwell =

Canadian novelist and poet (1837–1927)

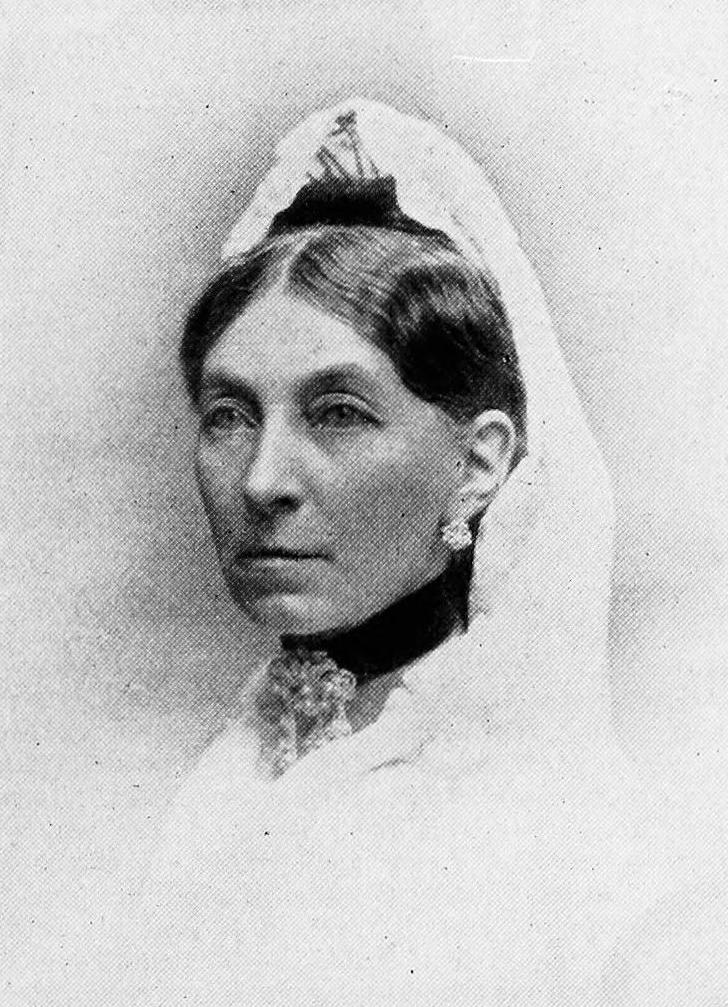
- Rothwell as she appeared in A Woman of the Century (1893)
- Born: Mary Ann Bessy Fowler; March 31, 1837; London, England
- Died: July 2, 1927 (aged 90); New Liskeard, Ontario, Canada
- Occupations: Novelist and poet
- Relatives: Daniel Fowler
- Writing career
- Years active: c. 1876 – c. 1914
- Period: Late 19th century; early 20th century
- Genre: War poetry
- Subjects: North-West Rebellion; Christian faith
- Notable works: "In Hospital" "Welcome Home"

Annie Fowler Rothwell Christie (Note: Also, less commonly, rendered "Rothwell-Christie.") (March 31, 1837 – July 2, 1927), born Mary Ann Bessy Fowler and publishing as Annie Rothwell, was a Canadian novelist and poet, active from 1876 to at least 1914. A writer of paeans to colonial forces during the North-West Rebellion and other imperial wars, she was known among contemporary critics mainly as a war poet.

== Background ==
Annie Rothwell lived and worked in a time of significant colonial consolidation and expansion in what is now Canada.

Rothwell's family immigrated from England in the early 1840s during the Great Migration of Canada, and she turned 30 the year Confederation was completed.

Rothwell lived mainly in Kingston, Ontario. The provincial capital for a brief period in the 1840s, Kingston was a significant military city, home to a number of installations including the Kingston Royal Naval Dockyard. It was represented in Parliament by John A. Macdonald, Canada's first prime minister, throughout the 19th century.

== Personal life ==
Rothwell was born in London, England. Through her mother, Elizabeth Gale, she was descended from a long line of English soldiers and officials, including Robert Martin Leake, Master of the Report Office, a position (likely a sinecure) in the Court of Chancery; (Note: On the role, and abolition in the early Victorian era, of the post of Master of the Report Office, see Smith, John Sidney (1834). A Treatise on the Practice of the Court of Chancery. Vol. 1. London: Saunders and Benning. pp. 20–21.) John Leake; and Stephen Leake. Her father was Daniel Fowler, a painter. She would later edit her father's autobiography.

The family moved to Canada when Rothwell was four years old. They first took up residence on Amherst Island near Kingston, Ontario. She was "educated at home, chiefly by her mother and a governess".

On May 19, 1862, she married Richard Rothwell, an Anglican minister and land agent "more than twice her age", who died in 1874. She married Israel James Christie, a rector from North Gower, on April 2, 1895.

By 1901 she lived in North Gower; by 1904, in Ottawa proper.

Rothwell is buried at Amherst Island.

== Literary career ==
Rothwell published five novels and numerous poems in anthologies and in the Canadian, British, and American popular press (especially Appletons' Journal). The anthologies in which Rothwell was featured, Robert Lecker notes, were consciously conceived by their editors as an element of the nation-building project: "all of the nineteenth-century anthologies were eminently political in their drive to value different models of Canadian nationalism as the nature of the country evolved".

In a profile published in 1888, Ethelwyn Wetherald summed up Rothwell's life and work thus:

Of this writer of fiction I have heard on good authority that she takes the deepest interest in Canadian politics, that she would prefer to hear good speeches at an election meeting to reading most of the new novels, and would rather witness the movements of a battalion in the drill shed than go to the opera. Love of her adopted country is perhaps her ruling passion, which was fanned to fever height by the North-West Rebellion. … Of the poems signed by Annie Rothwell's name, it may be said that they are born of admiration of some heroic deed, sympathy with some pathetic incident, or expression of some patriotic or other aspiration, shaped in verse of a rhythm and rhyme with which no fault can be found.

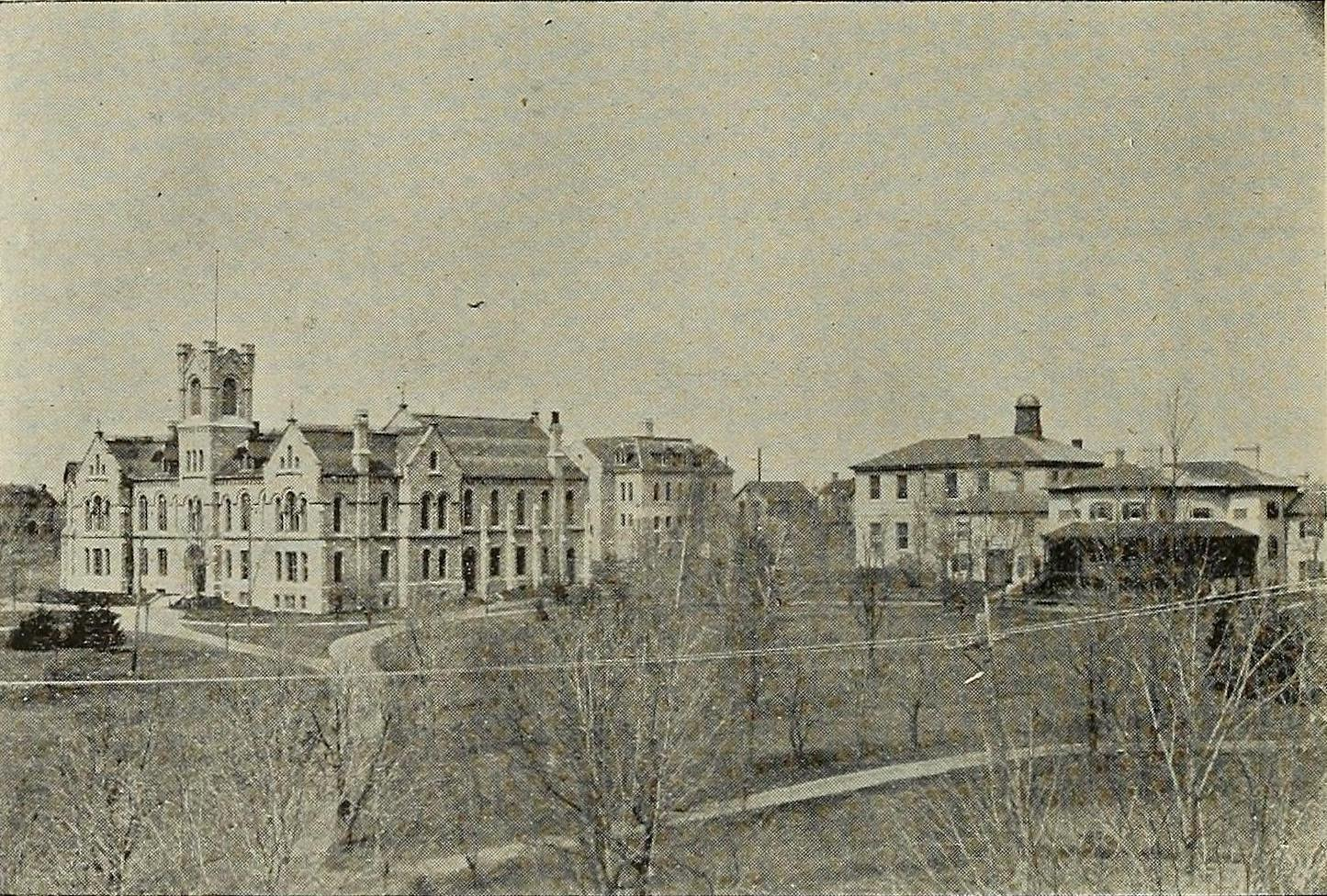
Queen's University, 1899.

Rothwell was a contemporary and acquaintance of Agnes Machar, also a native of Kingston. On December 18, 1889, an ode Rothwell had written in honour of the 50th anniversary of the founding of Queen's University was recited, following a poem Machar had written for the occasion. The poem, in sestains of iambic pentameter, exemplifies several persistent themes in Rothwell's work, including Christian faith and the achievement of lofty "ends":

Here Learning, large and gentle, points the way
Through patient labour and through lofty aim
To ends accomplished and through laurels won.
Here, lit by Faith unerring glows the ray
That lights alike the steep ascent to fame
And cheers the path of duty humbly done.

=== North-West Rebellion ===
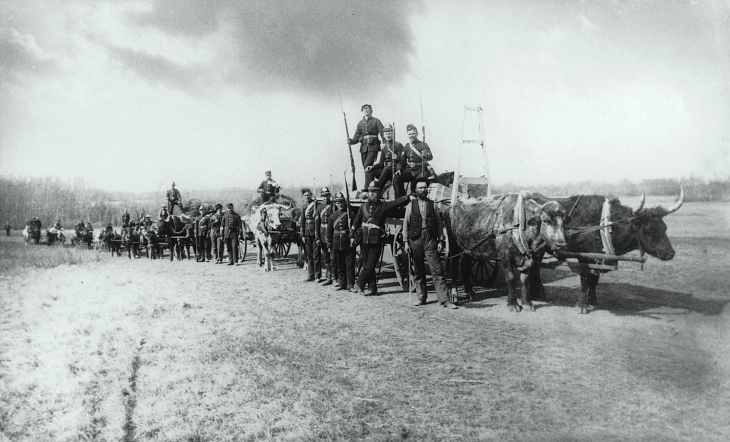
Dominion soldiers marching in what is now Saskatchewan in 1885, during the North-West Rebellion.

In Seas and Lands (1892), a travelogue mainly concerned with his trip to Japan but which begins with portraits of Canada and the United States, Edwin Arnold wrote that "the best war songs of the late half-breed (Note: The correct term for Louis Riel and a major group of opponents of colonial forces in the North-West Rebellion is Métis. Arnold's usage is racist.) rebellion were written by Annie Rothwell, of Kingston". (Note: For a critical account of the Orientalist tropes in Arnold's description of Japan, see Ferens, Dominika (2002). Edith and Winnifred Eaton: Chinatown Missions and Japanese Romances. Urbana, Illinois: University of Illinois Press. pp. 36–38. ISBN 0-252-02721-3. OCLC 47443724.) Her preoccupation with military themes caused John D. Logan, a contemporary critic, to anoint her the "supreme artist" of "Canadian martial poetesses". Thomas O'Hagan, another contemporary critic, concurred: "[a] fine spirit of Canadian patriotism permeates all her poetic work. She is perhaps strongest as a writer of war songs".

In 1901, Rothwell's poem "Welcome Home" (written on or about July 23, 1885) was published in the Canadian section of Patriotic Song: A Book of English Verse, an anthology of poetry "intended to be a representative collection of the patriotic poetry of the British Empire". Although the text does not make this explicit, the date of composition and triumphalist military imagery strongly suggest that the poem refers to the return of Dominion forces to eastern Canada after the colonial victory in the North-West Rebellion:

They show us work accomplished, hardships borne,
Courageous deeds, and patience under pain,
Their country's name upheld and glorified,
And Peace, dear purchased by their blood and toil.

Contemporary chronicler Conyngham Crawford Taylor asserts as much in his jingoistic Toronto "Called Back," from 1892 to 1847 (1892), in which he quotes Rothwell's poem in full following an account of the return of troops to Toronto after Prime Minister MacDonald's forces repressed the Rebellion. Taylor suggests that Rothwell's poem represents a faithful account of the scene in Toronto upon the return of imperial troops to the east: "[t]he return of the Queen's Own, Royal Grenadiers and Governor-General's Body Guards, amidst the spontaneous display of welcome by the tens of thousands of Toronto's citizens, was a sight seldom equalled". A modern-day historian tempers this assessment somewhat, noting the military display was a yearly event.

=== History ===
Rothwell contributed the poem "In Hospital" to Songs of the Great Dominion, an influential early anthology of Canadian poetry. "In Hospital", written in the voice of a soldier convalescing in a military hospital (probably following the North-West Rebellion), was published under the heading "The Spirit of Canadian History".

As of 1896, Rothwell was a "corresponding member" of the Women's Canadian Historical Society of Toronto, which stated in the preamble to its constitution that, among other purposes for the organization, "an intelligent and self-respecting national pride in Canadian literature needs to be awakened and encouraged". (Rothwell was a presumably a "corresponding member" from Kingston.)

== Religion ==
Rothwell was an active member of the Church of England in Canada.

In 1887, Rothwell delivered a lecture on "Modern Missions" to the Women's Auxiliary for the Diocese of Ontario (then, as now, headquartered in Kingston). Her lecture appeared following a paper titled "Work Among the Indians in Dacota", so it is likely that Rothwell's presentation concerned Anglican missionary work in North America among Indigenous peoples. Indeed, the missionary work of the Anglican Church, since the first settler colonists had arrived in what is now Canada, had long been a significant feature of the Canadian colonial project.

As of 1888–90, Rothwell was secretary of the Department of Literature of the Women's Auxiliary for the Diocese of Ontario.

== Works ==
=== Novels and short stories ===
- The Lost Lady Braithwaite. A novel, date unknown, serialized in St. James Magazine (a British publication).
- Avice (Note: The title of this novel is typically rendered "Alice Gray" when cited in contemporary reviews, but the print edition clearly refers to "Avice.") Gray. A novel serialized in four parts, from July to October 1876.
  - Rothwell, Annie (July 1876). "Avice Gray (chapters 1–4)". Appletons' Journal. 1 (1) – via University of Michigan.
  - Rothwell, Annie (August 1876). "Avice Gray (chapters 5–7)". Appletons' Journal. 1 (2) – via University of Michigan.
  - Rothwell, Annie (September 1876). "Avice Gray (chapters 8–10)". Appletons' Journal. 1 (3) – via University of Michigan.
  - Rothwell, Annie (October 1876). "Avice Gray (chapters 9–13)". Appletons' Journal. 1 (4) – via University of Michigan.
- Rothwell, Annie (November 29, 1873). "The Shadow of Daneham". Appletons' Journal. 10 (245). New York: 675 – via University of Michigan. A short story with Gothic, historical, and Christian themes about the ghost of a Restoration–era aristocrat at an English estate.
- Edge-Tools (1880). A novel serialized in two parts, from August to September 1880.
  - Rothwell, Annie (1880). "Edge-Tools (Part I)". Appletons' Journal. 9 (50) – via University of Michigan.
  - Rothwell, Annie (September 1880). "Edge-Tools (Part II)". Appletons' Journal. 9 (51) – via University of Michigan.
- Requital (1886). A novel serialized in The Toronto Mail.
- Rothwell, Annie (1887). Loved I Not Honour More!. Toronto: Rose Publishing Company. ISBN 9780665006364. OCLC 1111870656 – via Canadiana. As of 1896, the novel sold in paperback for 25 cents as part of Rose's Pocket Library.

=== Poems ===
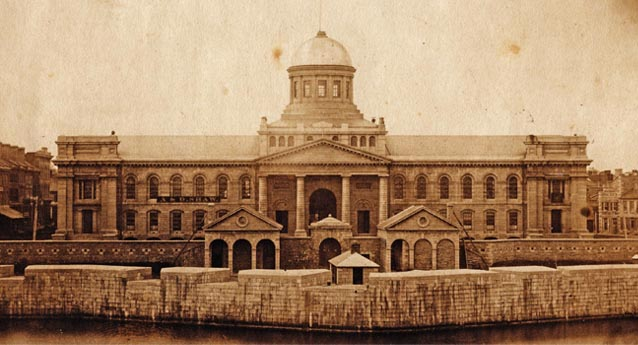
Kingston's City Hall and Market Battery, a military fortification in the city centre, 1857.

- Rothwell, Annie (April 1885). "Wells of Shebacas—Jan 19th, 1885". The Canadian Methodist Magazine. 21 (4): 349 – via Canadiana. A war poem, apparently about a battle of the Mahdist War.
- Rothwell, Annie (1892). "In Hospital; Aspiration; Memory". The Magazine of Poetry. 4 (1). Buffalo, New York: Charles Wells Moulton – via Internet Archive.
- Rothwell, Annie (1892). "The Limestone City". Picturesque Prince Edward County. Picton, Ontario. p. 128 – via Canadiana. An ode to Kingston.
- Rothwell, Annie (May 24, 1893). "As It Was in the Beginning". The Canada Presbyterian. 22 (21): 327 – via Canadiana. As evidenced by the magazine in which it appeared, the poem had strong Christian overtones. In an epilogue to the poem, however, Rothwell suggested a more nationalist interpretation. "The past history of Canada," she wrote, "is already recorded in many places in her monuments and the homes of her dead; but there is a fair city towards the sun-setting where the prophecy of her future may be read by those who have eyes and hearts."
- Rothwell, Annie (1900). "The Woman's Part; After the Battle; Welcome Home". In Rand, Theodore Harding (ed.). A Treasury of Canadian Verse. Toronto: William Briggs. pp. 63–67 – via Canadiana. Three war poems, collected in a contemporary anthology.
- Rothwell, Annie (May 7, 1914). "Address to the Bay of Quinte". The Weekly Ontario and Bay of Quinte Chronicle. 64: 4 – via Canadiana. An ode to the Bay of Quinte.

== Bibliography ==
- Taylor, Conyngham Crawford (1892). Toronto "Called Back," from 1892 to 1847 (4th ed.). Toronto: William Briggs.
- Megaw, Arthur Stanley, ed. (1901). Patriotic Song: A Book of English Verse: Being an Anthology of the Patriotic Poetry of the British Empire from the Defeat of the Spanish Armada till the Death of Queen Victoria. London: C. Arthur Pearson. OCLC 1050792514.
