= John David Smith =

John David Smith may refer to:

- John David Smith (Upper Canada politician)
- John David Smith (Ontario politician)
- John Smith (basketball, born 1969), American college basketball coach
- John Smith (rugby league), New Zealand rugby league player

== See also ==
- John Smith (disambiguation)
