= Louis Gérard =

Louis Gérard may refer to:

- Louis Gérard (racing driver)
- Louis Gérard (botanist)
