= God Squad =

God Squad may refer to:

- Endangered Species Committee
- God Squad (comics) - an informal alliance of comic book characters
- The God Squad (Telecare) - an American religious television program
- God Squad (Global Awakening) - a Christian reality series produced by Christian organization Global Awakening
- God Squad - a Belegarth medieval combat-sport team based out of Portland, Oregon.
- Lyons Forum - informal Australian political faction
- God's Squad - Christian motorcycle club
