= Sir John Smith =

Sir John Smith may refer to:

- John Smith (High Sheriff of Kent) (1557–1608), English politician
- John Smith (banneret) (1616–1644), English Royalist soldier
- Sir John Silvester Smith, 1st Baronet (1734–1789), first of the Smith-Dodsworth baronets
- Any of the first three Smith baronets:
  - Sir John Smith, 1st Baronet (1744–1807)
  - Sir John Wyldbore Smith, 2nd Baronet (1770–1852), second Smith-Marriott baronet
  - Sir John James Smith, 3rd Baronet (1800–1862), third Smith-Marriott baronet
- John Smith (British Army officer, born 1754) (1754–1837), British general
- Sir John Mark Frederick Smith (1790–1874), British general
- John Cyril Smith (1911–1997), English criminal legal scholar
- John Smith (businessman) (1920–1995), British association football executive
- Sir John Lindsay Eric Smith (1923-2007), British banker, Member of Parliament, and founder of The Landmark Trust
- John Smith (police officer) (1938-), Metropolitan Police Deputy Commissioner

== See also ==
- John Smith (disambiguation)
