= James Smith (Canada West politician) =

James Smith (October 16, 1811 – August 15, 1874) was a lawyer, judge and politician in Canada West. He represented Durham in the Legislative Assembly of the Province of Canada from 1848 to 1854.

He was the son of John David Smith, who served in the assembly for Upper Canada. Smith, who lived in Port Hope, served on the town police board. He also served as the town's mayor in 1851. Smith became president of the Port Hope and Peterborough Railway Company in 1853. He later served as judge for Victoria County.

Two of his brothers, Sidney and John Shuter, also served in the assembly.
