= Douglas James Smith =

English cricketer and umpire

Douglas Smith
Personal information
- Full name: Douglas James Smith
- Born: 29 May 1873; Batley, Yorkshire, England
- Died: 16 August 1949 (aged 76); Grahamstown, Cape Province, South Africa
- Batting: Right-handed
- Bowling: Right-arm off break

Domestic team information
- Years: Team
- 1889–1893: Worcestershire
- 1896–1898: Somerset
- 1901–1904: Worcestershire
- 1907–1912: Glamorgan
- First-class debut: 7 May 1896 Somerset v Gloucestershire
- Last First-class: 28 July 1904 Worcestershire v Lancashire

Umpiring information
- Tests umpired: 1 (1914–1914)
- FC umpired: 10 (1909–1928)

Career statistics
Competition	First-class
Matches	30
Runs scored	558
Batting average	11.62
100s/50s	0/2
Top score	62
Balls bowled	26
Wickets	0
Bowling average	–
5 wickets in innings	0
10 wickets in match	0
Best bowling	0/8
Catches/stumpings	24/1
- Source: CricketArchive, 23 October 2010

Douglas James Smith (29 May 1873 – 16 August 1949) was an English first-class cricketer and umpire. He played for Somerset and Worcestershire, as well as appearing for Glamorgan, not at the time a first-class county, in the Minor Counties Championship. He also umpired one Test match.

Born in Batley, Yorkshire, Smith made his debut in May 1896, for Somerset against Gloucestershire at Bristol, but made only 8 and 0. He then had a relatively good period, his next three games (six innings) yielding 175 runs and including his only two half-centuries: 62 against Middlesex at Lord's and 54 against Sussex at Hove. His form then fell away and 12 further innings that year produced only 164 more runs. The 1896 season also saw his only bowling in first-class cricket, though he took no wickets. Smith played seven games in the middle of the 1897 season, and two more the following summer, but enjoyed no success at all, recording just 97 runs in 17 innings.

His next first-class game was not until 1901, when he turned out for Worcestershire against Hampshire at Worcester, making 3 and 10. He played a handful more games for the county over the next few years, but did nothing of note other than to make his only first-class stumping. This came in his very last first-class game, against Lancashire in 1904, when in the absence of Worcestershire's usual keeper (George Gaukrodger) he played behind the stumps and accounted for Lancashire's own keeper, William Findlay.

Smith played on for Glamorgan at minor-county level for a number of years, making 69 against Dorset in 1907. Three years later he once more filled in as wicket-keeper, playing against Worcestershire in a friendly match, and stumped Arthur Conway. (This match was, however, more memorable for Worcestershire slow left-armer's John Cuffe's extraordinary first-innings figures of 9–5.)

He stood as an umpire six times in first-class cricket, including replacing Alfred Atfield for the fifth Test between South Africa and England at St George's Park, Port Elizabeth in 1913–14. His other games as umpire were three in the Currie Cup in 1908–09, one on Marylebone Cricket Club (MCC)'s tour in 1909–10 and one final Currie Cup match as late as 1925–26, when he was 52 years old.

Smith died in South Africa, in Grahamstown, Cape Province at the age of 76.

Two of his relatives played first-class cricket. His brother William also played for Somerset in the 1890s, while his father John had played for Lancashire and Yorkshire in the 1860s.
