= John Smith House =

John Smith House may refer to:

England

- John Smith House (Southwark), London, former headquarters of the British Labour Party

Scotland

- John Smith House, Glasgow, main regional office for Unite the Union in Scotland, former headquarters of the Scottish Labour Party

United States

- John W. Smith House, Rochester, Indiana, listed on the NRHP in Fulton County, Indiana
- John Smith House (Le Claire, Iowa), NRHP-listed
- Raccoon John Smith House, Owensboro, Kentucky, NRHP-listed in Bath County, Kentucky
- John Mace Smith House, Fall River, Massachusetts, NRHP-listed
- John Smith House (Mahwah, New Jersey), listed on the NRHP in Bergen County, New Jersey
- John Smith House (Washington Valley, New Jersey), listed on the NRHP in Morris County, New Jersey
- John Smith House (Kingston, New York), NRHP-listed, in Ulster County
- John T. Smith House, Newberg, Oregon, listed on the NRHP in Yamhill County, Oregon
- John Sterling Smith Jr. House, Chappell Hill, Texas, listed on the NRHP in Washington County, Texas
- John Smith House (Clinton, Wisconsin), listed on the NRHP in Rock County, Wisconsin
- John Y. and Emerette C. Smith House, Lehi, Utah, listed on the NRHP in Utah County, Utah

== See also ==
- Smith House (disambiguation)
