= Six Clerks =

Legal position in English equity system

The Six Clerks' Office was a public legal office that served the equitable jurisdiction of the English Court of Chancery in London, England, until the mid-19th century.

== The Office ==
The Office was in Chancery Lane, near the Holborn end. The business of the office was to enrol commissions, pardons, patents, warrants, etc., that had passed the Great Seal in addition to other business in Chancery. In the early history of the Court of Chancery, the Six Clerks and their under-clerks appear to have acted as the attorneys of the suitors. As business increased, these under-clerks became a distinct body, and were recognized by the court under the denomination of sworn clerks, or clerks in court. The advance of commerce, with its consequent accession of wealth, so multiplied the subjects requiring the judgment of a Court of Equity, that the limits of a public office were found wholly inadequate to supply a sufficient number of officers to conduct the business of the suitors. Hence originated the "Solicitors of the Court of Chancery". The Office also facilitated Chancery claims by litigants in forma pauperis (impoverished), including children and those suffering from mental illness.

The "Six Clerks" were abolished by the Court of Chancery Act 1842 following the reforming work of Edwin Wilkins Field and Thomas Pemberton.

== Bibliography ==
- Lobban, M. (2004a). "Preparing for Fusion: Reforming the Nineteenth-Century Court of Chancery, Part I". Law and History Review. University of Illinois. Archived from the original on 9 July 2008.
- Lobban, M. (2004b). "Preparing for Fusion: Reforming the Nineteenth-Century Court of Chancery, Part II". Law and History Review. University of Illinois. Archived from the original on 19 September 2008.
- Smith, J. S. (1834) A Treatise on the Practice of the Court of Chancery, with an appendix of forms and precedents of costs, adapted to the last new orders, 3rd ed. p.62
- Wheatley, H. B., ed. (1893). The Diary of Samuel Pepys. London: George Bell & Son.
