= John Smith (cricketer, born 1835) =

English cricketer

Personal information
- Full name: John Smith
- Born: 8 November 1835; Ruddington, Nottinghamshire, England
- Died: 29 May 1889 (aged 53); Bury, Greater Manchester, England
- Batting: Right-handed
- Bowling: Right-arm medium
- Relatives: Arthur Smith (son)

Domestic team information
- Years: Team
- 1864: Nottinghamshire

Career statistics
Competition	First-class
Matches	2
Runs scored	30
Batting average	7.50
100s/50s	–/–
Top score	27
Balls bowled	44
Wickets	1
Bowling average	21.00
5 wickets in innings	–
10 wickets in match	–
Best bowling	1/21
Catches/stumpings	1/–
- Source: Cricinfo, 20 May 2012

John Smith (8 November 1835 – 29 May 1889) was an English cricketer. Smith was a right-handed batsman who bowled right-arm medium pace. He was born at Ruddington, Nottinghamshire.

Smith made two first-class appearances for Nottinghamshire in 1864, against Kent at Crystal Palace, and Surrey at The Oval. Against Kent, Nottinghamshire won the toss and elected to bat first, making 143 all out, with Smith scoring 27 runs before he was dismissed leg before by Harry Fryer. In response, Kent made 124 all out in their first-innings, with Smith taking the wicket of John Burton to finish with figures of 1/21 from eleven overs. Responding in their second-innings, Nottinghamshire made 165 all out, with Smith being dismissed for a single run by Edgar Willsher. Chasing 185 to win, Kent were dismissed in their second-innings for 110, losing by 74 runs. In the match against Surrey at Trent Bridge, Nottinghamshire won the toss and elected to bat, making 107 all out in their first-innings, with Smith being dismissed for a duck by William Shepherd. In response, Surrey made 127 all out in their second-innings, to which Nottinghamshire responded to in their second-innings by being dismissed for just 81, with Smith being dismissed for 2 runs by George Griffith. Chasing just 62 for victory, Surrey narrowly reached their target with just a wicket to spare.

He later stood as an umpire in first-class cricket, standing in 39 matches between 1875 and 1882. He died at Bury, Greater Manchester, on 29 May 1889. His son, Arthur, was also a first-class cricketer.
