= Jan Schmidt =

Jan Schmidt may refer to:

- Jan Schmidt (director) (1934–2019), Czech film director
- Jan Schmidt (footballer) (1937–2023), Polish footballer
- Jan Schmidt (badminton) (fl. 1940s), see Danish National Badminton Championships

== See also ==
- Jan Schmidt-Garre (born 1962), German film director and producer
- Jan Priiskorn-Schmidt (born 1951), Danish film actor
- Jan Smit (disambiguation)
