= Louis Gérard (botanist) =

French botanist (1733–1819)

- Born: Louis Gérard; 16 July 1733; Cotignac, Var, France
- Died: 16 November 1819; Cotignac, Var, France
- Education: University of Montpellier
- Known for: Flora gallo-provincialis (1761)
- Scientific career
- Fields: Botany
- Author abbrev. (botany): Gérard

Louis Gérard (16 July 1733 – 16 November 1819) was a French botanist and physician, best known as the author of Flora gallo-provincialis, a major early work documenting the plant life of Provence, first published in 1761.

== Biography ==
Louis Gérard was born on 16 July 1733 in Cotignac, in the Var department of southern France.

After completing his early studies in Draguignan, Gérard turned to medicine under the encouragement of Joseph Lieutaud, a physician and family acquaintance. He enrolled at the University of Montpellier, where he met Philibert Commerson, whose influence led him to devote himself increasingly to botany.

Gérard travelled extensively throughout Provence collecting plant specimens that later formed the basis of Flora gallo-provincialis, published in Latin in 1761 while he was living in Paris. Bernard de Jussieu offered him a teaching position at the Jardin des Plantes in Paris, but Gérard declined and returned to Provence to practise as a rural physician.

Despite leaving Paris, Gérard remained scientifically active, corresponding with prominent botanists such as Carl Linnaeus, Bernard de Jussieu and Antoine de Jussieu, Philibert Commerson, Johannes Burman, François Boissier de Sauvages de Lacroix, Antoine Gouan, Casimir Christoph Schmidel, Carlo Allioni and John Smith. In 1787, he was elected a corresponding member of the French Royal Academy of Sciences.

Gérard also held the position of canon at the Church of Saint-Louis-du-Louvre in Paris. During the Reign of Terror, he was imprisoned with his family in Cabasse after protesting against the death sentence of Chrétien Guillaume de Lamoignon de Malesherbes. He was released following the fall of Robespierre on 9 Thermidor.

Louis Gérard died on 16 November 1819 at the age of 86.

== Selected works ==
- Flora gallo-provincialis (1761)

== Legacy ==
The standard author abbreviation Gérard is used to indicate Louis Gérard as the authority for botanical names.
