= Sir Philip Jennings-Clerke, 1st Baronet =

Sir Philip Jennings-Clerke, 1st Baronet (c. 1722 – January 1788) was a British politician who sat in the House of Commons from 1768 to 1788, and the 1st Jennings-Clerke Baronet.

== Life ==
Jennings was the son of Philip Jennings of Duddleston Hall, Shropshire, and was baptised Philip Jennings. He was educated at Westminster School. He married Anne Thompson, the daughter of Colonel Richard Thompson of Jamaica and Coley Park, Reading. He had an "undistinguished military career" in the Horse Guards attaining the rank of Lieutenant-Colonel. He succeeded to the estates of his maternal uncle Sir Talbot Clerke, 6th Baronet, and changed his name to Jennings-Clerke in the early 1760s. Around 1770 he bought a lodge now known as Foxlease, just outside Lyndhurst, Hampshire, and converted it into a grand, two-storey mansion.

Jennings was a Member of Parliament for Totnes between 1768 and 1788. He was created 1st Baronet Jennings-Clerke of Duddlestone Hall on 26 October 1774.

His only remaining son, Sir Charles Philip Jennings survived him by only a few months, whereupon the baronetcy became extinct.

== Children ==
His children included:

- John Edward (died before 1788)
- Charles Philip (died 22 April 1788)
- Anne (29 November 1749 – 25 July 1777). Married Thomas Duncombe MP.
- Frances (died 12 April 1821)

Parliament of Great Britain
Preceded by Richard Savage Lloyd; Henry Seymour	Member of Parliament for Totnes; 1768 – 1788; With: Peter Burrell 1768–1774; James Amyatt 1774–1780; Launcelot Brown 1780–1784; The Hon. Henry Phipps 1784–1788	Succeeded by Viscount Barnard; The Hon. Henry Phipps
Baronetage of Great Britain
New creation	Baronet (of Duddlestone); 1774–1788	Succeeded by Charle Philip Jennings
