= Jennings-Clerke baronets =

British title (1774–1788)

Escutcheon of the Jennings-Clerke baronets of Duddlestone Hall

The Jennings-Clerke baronetcy, of Duddlestone Hall in the County of Shropshire, was a title in the Baronetage of Great Britain. It was created on 26 October 1774 for Philip Jennings-Clerke, originally Philip Jennings, Member of Parliament for Totnes. The title became extinct on the death of his son Sir Charles Philip Jennings, 2nd Baronet, who died a few months after his father in 1788.

== Clerke baronets, of Duddlestone Hall (1774) ==
- Sir Philip Jennings-Clerke, 1st Baronet (1722–1788)
- Sir Charles Philip Jennings, 2nd Baronet (died 22 April 1788) buried in Lyndhurst, Hampshire with a memorial sculpted by John Flaxman.

== See also ==
- Clerke baronets

== Notes ==
Baronetage of Great Britain
Preceded by Smith baronets	Jennings-Clerke baronets of Duddlestone Hall; 26 October 1774	Succeeded by Wintringham baronets
