= John Smyth (Anglican priest) =

John Smyth was an Anglican Archdeacon in Ireland in the late seventeenth and early eighteenth centuries.

He was born in County Armagh; and educated at Trinity College, Dublin. He was Vicar of Donaghmoyne from 1663 and Archdeacon of Clogher from 1682, holding both positions until his death in 1704.
