= William Smith (Somerset cricketer) =

English cricketer

William Robert Rutherford Smith (23 April 1871 – 23 December 1946) played first-class cricket for Somerset between 1895 and 1898 and for the MCC in 1901 and 1902. He also played Minor Counties cricket for Wiltshire from 1899 to 1913 and for Worcestershire in minor matches before Worcestershire achieved first-class status in 1899. From 1919 to 1930, Smith stood as an umpire in first-class cricket matches.

Smith was born at Batley, West Yorkshire and died at Ewell, Surrey.
