= Smith-Marriott baronets =

Title in the Baronetage of Great Britain

- Escutcheon of the Smith-Marriott baronets of Sydling St Nicholas
- Creation date: 1774
- Status: extant
- Motto: Semper fidelis, Always faithful

The Smith, later Smith-Marriott Baronetcy, of Sydling St Nicholas in the County of Dorset, is a title in the Baronetage of Great Britain. It was created on 1 June 1774 for John Smith, High Sheriff of Dorset in 1772. The second Baronet married Elizabeth Anne, daughter of Reverend James Marriott. The fourth Baronet assumed by Royal sign-manual the additional surname of Marriott. The fifth Baronet was High Sheriff of Dorset in 1873.

Sir Edmund Charles Wyldbore Smith (1877–1938), great-grandson of the second Baronet, was a civil servant, diplomat, and businessman.

== Smith, later Smith-Marriott baronets, of Sydling St Nicholas (1774) ==
- Sir John Smith, 1st Baronet (1744–1807)
- Sir John Wyldbore Smith, 2nd Baronet (1770–1852)
- Sir John James Smith, 3rd Baronet (1800–1862)
- Sir William Marriott Smith-Marriott, 4th Baronet (1801–1864)
- Sir William Henry Smith-Marriott, 5th Baronet (1835–1924)
- Sir William John Smith-Marriott, 6th Baronet (1870–1941)
- Sir John Richard Wyldbore Smith-Marriott, 7th Baronet (1875–1942)
- Sir William Smith-Marriott, 8th Baronet (1865–1943)
- Sir Hugh Randolph Cavendish Smith-Marriott, 9th Baronet (1868–1944)
- Sir Ralph George Cavendish Smith-Marriott, 10th Baronet (1900–1987)
- Sir Hugh Cavendish Smith-Marriott, 11th Baronet (1925–2013)
- Sir Peter Francis Smith-Marriott, 12th Baronet (1927–2023)
- Sir Martin Ralph Smith-Marriott, 13th Baronet (born 1962)

The heir presumptive is the current holder's brother, Neil Hugh Smith-Marriott (born 1964).

== Notes ==
Baronetage of Great Britain
| Preceded by Raymond baronets | Smith baronets of Sydling St Nicholas; 1 June 1774 | Succeeded by Jennings-Clerke baronets |
