= John Noel Smith =

Irish painter

- Born: 1952 (age 73–74); Dublin, Ireland
- Education: Dún Laoghaire College of Art and Design; Berlin University of the Arts
- Occupation: Painter
- Known for: Oil painting
- Movement: [contemporary art]
- Elected: Aosdána
- Website: johnnoelsmith.com

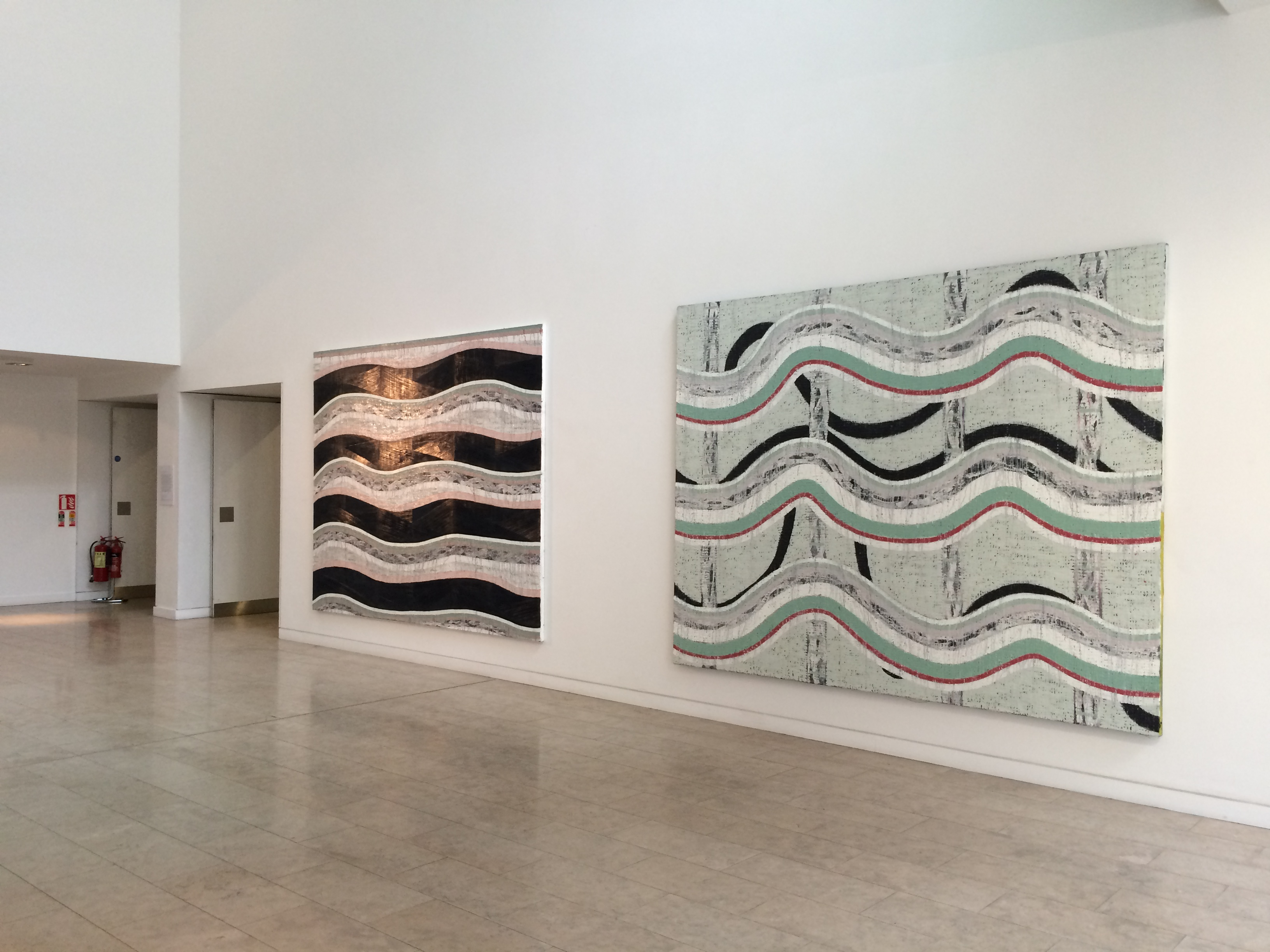
German Requiem I and II by Smith, 2014–15, on display in the Hamilton Gallery.

John Noel Smith (born 1952) is an Irish painter. He is a member of Aosdána.

== Early life ==
Smith was born in Dublin in 1952.

== Education and career ==
Smith studied at the Dún Laoghaire College of Art and Design. He then went to Berlin where he worked and lived for 20 years, studying at the Berlin University of the Arts.

He has had numerous solo exhibitions, including one in the Irish Museum of Modern Art in 1990 and the Royal Hibernian Academy in 2002.

Smith's work is abstract and often monochrome, inspired by the Ogham alphabet and Celtic knot.
