= John Smith (cricketer, born 1882) =

English cricketer

John Willoughby Dixie Smith
- Born: 11 March 1882; Blaby, Leicestershire, England
- Died: 2 October 1959 (aged 77); Harrow on the Hill, Middlesex, England

Rugby union career
Senior career
Years	Team	Apps	(Points)
1902–1912	Leicester Tigers	132	(81)
- Cricket career

Cricket information
- Batting: Right-handed
- Bowling: Unknown

Domestic team information
- Years: Team
- 1921: Leicestershire

Career statistics
Competition	First-class
Matches	2
Runs scored	30
Batting average	7.50
100s/50s	–/–
Top score	25
Balls bowled	30
Wickets	–
Bowling average	–
5 wickets in innings	–
10 wickets in match	–
Best bowling	–
Catches/stumpings	–/–
- Source: Cricinfo, 7 February 2013

John Willoughby Dixie Smith (11 March 1882 – 2 October 1959) was an English cricketer and rugby union player. Smith was a utility back in rugby and right-handed batsman in cricket, although his bowling style is unknown. He was born at Blaby, Leicestershire. He was also known as John Willoughby Dixie-Smith.

== School and rugby ==
Smith attended Oundle School in Northamptonshire in 1897 and 1898. On 20 January 1902 he made his debut for Leicester Tigers against Plymouth, scoring a try in a 5–3 defeat. Smith played against Exeter the next day, but did not feature again that season. He featured regularly in the 1903–04 & 1904–05 seasons before leaving the club for two seasons. He re-joined in 1907 and played most weeks, in 1908–09 he played in 36 games, the most of any of his seasons and captained the club on 3 occasions. He played his final match on 2 March 1912 against Headingly.

== World War 1 and cricket ==
He later served in World War I with the Leicestershire Regiment, where he held the rank of Lieutenant. Following the war, Smith made two first-class appearances for Leicestershire in the 1921 County Championship against Gloucestershire and Glamorgan. He scored 30 runs in his two matches with a high score of 25 and a batting average of 7.50.

He died at Harrow on the Hill, Middlesex on 2 October 1959.
