= John Smith (comedian) =

British comedian, actor and performer

- Born: Newcastle
- Occupations: Actor, Performer
- Known for: British Sign Language user

John Smith is a British comedian, actor and performer. He is deaf and a British Sign Language user.

== Early life ==
Smith was born in Newcastle and raised in Mansfield. After contracting meningitis at the age of 3, he became deaf. Smith attended the Ewing School for the Deaf in Nottingham in a Partial Hearing Unit and was raised orally, although he picked a lot of BSL informally from other pupils.

He left school with CSEs in carpentry and geography. After school, Smith found work as a carpenter with the help of a social worker. He worked for 15 years for two different companies, although, upon leaving the second one, he sued them for discrimination, as he was never provided with access and accommodation. After that, Smith has taught BSL in colleges.

== Comedy ==
Smith did not start his career as a stand-up comedian until 2005 at the age of 40 when he joined a local comedy club. He cites Peter Kay, Tommy Cooper and Billy Connolly as his inspirations.

Since his debut, Smith has performed extensively in deaf clubs and theatres across the UK, Europe, America, Australia and New Zealand. He has also featured in several comedy shows on BSL Zone. For his role in the comedy "Still Here", Smith won Best Actor at Ippocampus Ciak (2012).

Smith has also appeared on the soap opera Doctors on BBC1 in a supporting role, on BBC See Hear and on Irish Afternoon Show on RTÉ.

== Comedy style ==
Smith's humor derives from the differences between deaf and hearing people and from daily experiences of deaf people. He often makes fun of sign language interpreters. In his early shows, his humour often took aim at hearing people and their mannerism through the filter of his deaf experience. He used to end his shows by smashing on stage a hearing aid donated by an audience member. He also teased people with cochlear implants, a controversial issue among deaf people. Smith has since toned down his comedy to be more inclusive (especially of younger audience) and to avoid singling out members of the public.

His comedic style relies on physical comedy, mime and slapstick. Sometimes he is supported by his wife to provide voiceover for a hearing audience, but most of the times the show is purely in BSL. Many jokes are visual and rely on the characteristics of sign language and cannot be directly translated into spoken English.
