= John Smith House (Clinton, Wisconsin) =

Historic house in Wisconsin, United States

- U.S. National Register of Historic Places
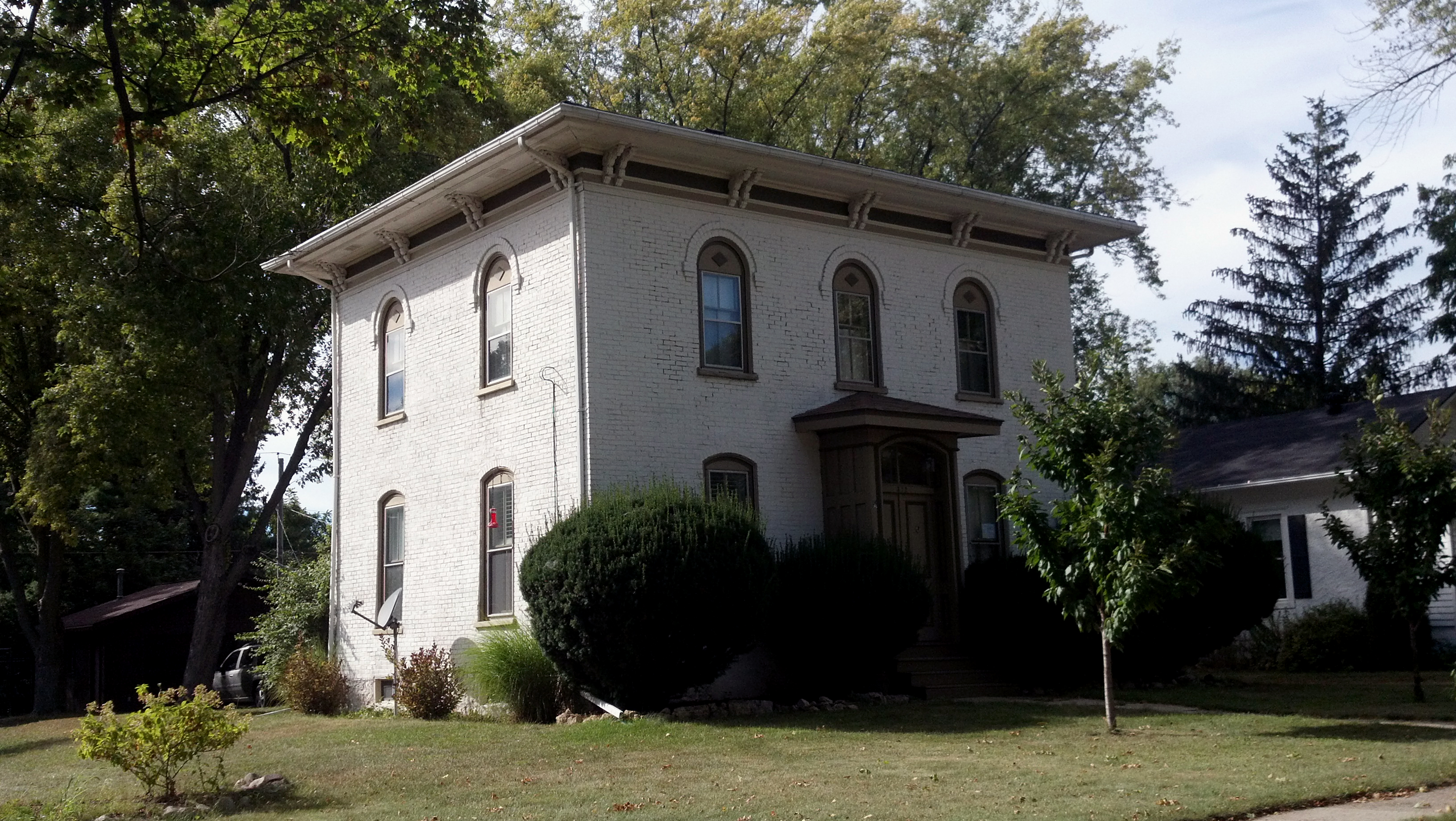
- John Smith House
- Location: 312 Pleasant St., Clinton, Wisconsin
- Coordinates: 42°33′24″N 88°52′04″W
- Area: less than one acre
- Built: 1869
- Architectural style: Italianate
- MPS: Clinton MRA
- NRHP reference No.: 85001663
- Added to NRHP: August 1, 1985

The John Smith House is an Italianate-style house built in 1869 in Clinton, Wisconsin. In 1985 it was added to the National Register of Historic Places and in 1989 to the State Register of Historic Places.

The state's survey form calls the Smith house "one of the best and earliest Italianate houses in Clinton." It stands two stories, with brick walls on a foundation of rough-cut limestone. The windows' hoodmoulds are rounded. At the top of the wall is a frieze with paired brackets supporting broad horizontal eaves, a hallmark of Italianate style.
