= List of civil parishes in County Monaghan =

This is a link page for all twenty-three civil parishes in County Monaghan in the Republic of Ireland. Alternative spellings of parish names are denoted directly afterward in brackets.

- Aghabog
- Aghnamullen
- Ballybay
- Clones
- Clontibret
- Currin
- Donagh
- Donaghmoyne
- Drummully
- Drumsnat
- Ematris
- Errigal Truagh [Errigal Trough]
- Inishkeen
- Killanny
- Killeevan
- Kilmore
- Magheracloone
- Magheross
- Monaghan
- Muckno
- Tydavnet [Tedavnet]
- Tyholland [Tehallan]
- Tullycorbet

== See also ==
- List of townlands in County Monaghan
