= John Smith (cricketer, born 1833) =

English cricketer

John Smith (23 March 1833 – 12 February 1909) was an English first-class cricketer. He was a left-handed batsman and left arm round arm fast bowler, who usually fielded at slip or point. Although he was born in Yeadon, Leeds, Yorkshire, England, he made his first-class debut for Lancashire in their second first-class match against Middlesex at Islington in 1865, where he opened the batting scoring 23 and 21. He then played two matches for his native Yorkshire in the same year, before returning to Lancashire for whom he played occasionally until 1869. In eight first-class games, Smith scored 181 runs at 12.92, with a best of 40 not out, and took 18 wickets at 20.11 with a best of 4 for 46.

He also played as a young professional in Scotland for Hawick, Melrose and Kelso and Langholm and later appeared for Worcestershire where he later became groundsman. Smith also stood once as a first-class umpire, in 1865. After a period of Army service, he was known in Yeadon as 'Soldier Johnny', but at Worcester became known as 'The Doctor', because of the quality of the pitches he prepared.

His son, Douglas James Smith, played for Somerset, Worcestershire and Glamorgan in their pre first-class days while another, William Smith played for Somerset, the Marylebone Cricket Club (MCC) and Wiltshire.

John Smith died in Worcester, England, in February 1909.
