= John Smith (footballer, born 1944) =

Welsh footballer

Personal information
- Full name: Johnathan Smith
- Date of birth: 13 September 1944 (age 82)
- Place of birth: Johnstown, Wrexham, Wales
- Position: Defender

Youth career
- Burnley

Senior career*
Years	Team	Apps	(Gls)
1963–1966	Wrexham	24	(0)
- Caernarfon Town
- * Club domestic league appearances and goals

Johnathan Smith (born 13 September 1944) is a Welsh former professional footballer who played as a defender. He made appearances in the English Football League with Wrexham. He also played for Caernarfon Town in the Welsh League.
