= John Smith (footballer, born 1970) =

English footballer

Personal information
- Full name: John Smith
- Date of birth: 23 July 1970 (age 56)
- Place of birth: Liverpool, England
- Position: Full back

Senior career*
Years	Team	Apps	(Gls)
1988–1989	Tranmere Rovers	2	(0)
- * Club domestic league appearances and goals

John Smith (born 23 July 1970) is an English footballer, who played as a full back in the Football League for Tranmere Rovers.
