= William Briggs (publisher) =

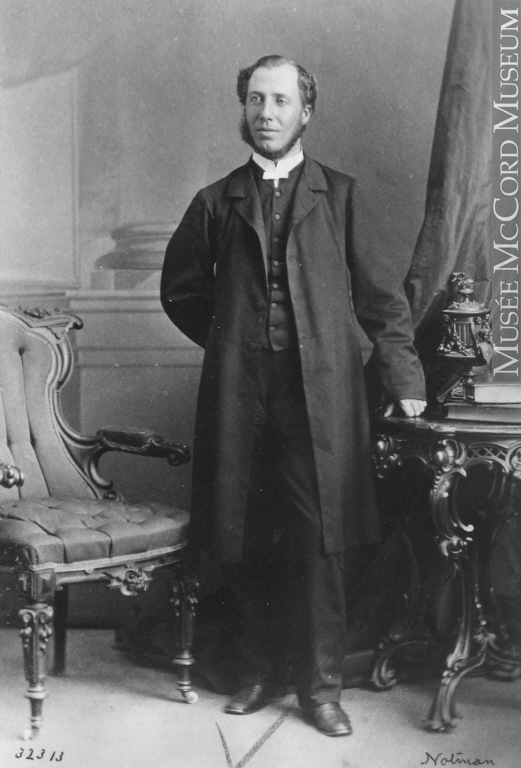
- Briggs in 1868
- Born: 9 September 1836; Banbridge, Ireland
- Died: 5 November 1922 (aged 86); Port Credit, Ontario, Canada
- Occupations: Minister; Publisher

William Briggs (9 September 1836 – 5 November 1922) was an Irish-born Canadian Methodist minister and publisher. His popularity as a preacher led him to become pastor of Metropolitan Church in Toronto. As book steward from 1879 to 1918 the Methodist Book and Publishing House became one of Canada's most prominent publishing houses; after he stepped down it was renamed Ryerson Press.

== Life and career ==
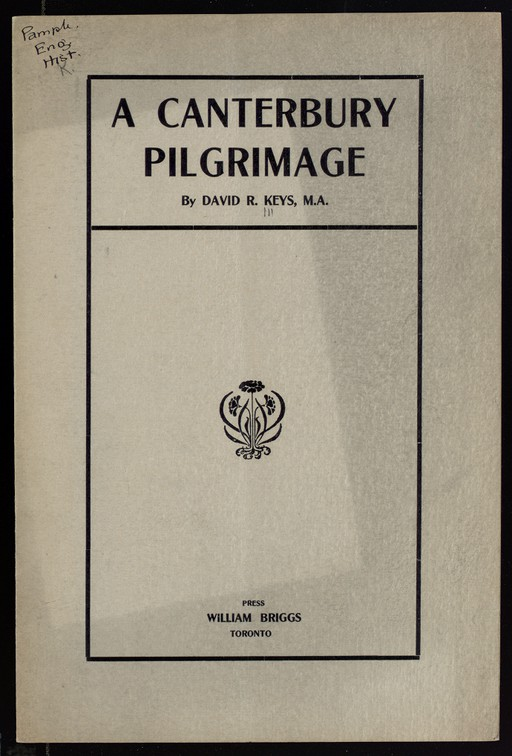
A Canterbury Pilgrimage by David R. Keys, published by William Briggs Press

William Briggs was born to the Scottish-Irish family of Thomas and Mary Briggs in Banbridge, Ireland, on 9 September 1836. His mother died when he was about six.

When he was about six the Briggs family moved to Liverpool. Briggs attended Mount Street Grammar School and the Liverpool Collegiate School. During this time he was drawn deeply to religion and began preaching throughout the Liverpool area.

In his early twenties Briggs immigrated to the Province of Canada and became involved with the Canada Conference of the Methodist Church. After working as a lay preacher in Ormstown in Canada East from 1859 he became ordained in 1863, after which he served in numerous churches throughout Canada. By the mid-1870s he was in Toronto, where he was popular as a preacher and served in the Toronto Conference as financial secretary in 1874, district chairman in 1875, and secretary in 1876–77. In 1876 he became pastor of Metropolitan Church in Toronto, which was the centre of Methodism in Canada. Briggs attended every General Conference from 1874 to 1918. In 1886 Cobourg's Victoria University awarded him an honorary Doctor of Divinity; he served on its board of regents in 1906–07.

In February 1879 Briggs was elected book steward of the Methodist Book and Publishing House, a small religious bookstore that did a small amount of publishing. Briggs expanded the firm's publishing activity and in 1889 had it branch into secular publishing. By the 1890s the publisher averaged 20 original books a year, including such religious fare as that of George Blewett and secular histories, fiction, and poetry. Briggs promoted the works of Canadian authors such as Robert W. Service and Nellie McClung, and the publisher become one of the most successful in the young nation. The publisher's output of Canadian peaked in 1897 with 37 titles.

Briggs joined the Toronto Board of Trade in 1898 and served as president of the Master Printers' and Bookbinders' Association of Toronto. The General Conference made him book steward emeritus in 1918. He was succeeded that year by the reverend Samuel Wesley Fallis, and Briggs stepped down from publishing in 1919, and that year the Methodist Book and Publishing House became Ryerson Press. Briggs trained a number of editors who were to leave a mark on Canadian publishing, including McClelland & Stewart co-founders John McClelland and Frederick Goodchild and their later partner George Stewart.

Little is known of Briggs' politics or personal beliefs. He died at his son's home in Port Credit, Ontario, on 5 November 1922. He left an estate of more than $80,000 and was buried at Mount Pleasant Cemetery in Toronto.

== Personal life ==
Briggs married Rosalie Marian Clarke (d. 1919) in Montreal on 27 August 1868. The couple had one son.

== Works cited ==
- Fiskney, Janet B. (Fall 1995). "Beyond the Shadow of William Briggs, Part I: Setting the Stage and Introducing the Players". Papers of the Bibliographical Society of Canada. 33 (2). Toronto: The Bibliographical Society of Canada. ISSN 2562-8941.
- Hamelin, Danielle (2005). "Briggs, William". Dictionary of Canadian Biography. University of Toronto / Université Laval. Archived from the original on 6 September 2015.
- Macskimming, Roy (2012). The Perilous Trade: "Book Publishing in Canada, 1946-2006". McClelland & Stewart. ISBN 978-1-55199-261-7.
