= John Smyth (Catholic priest) =

The Very Rev. John Smyth V.G. (1824 – 30 June 1870) was a Catholic vicar general in Adelaide, South Australia.

== History ==
Smyth was born in Kilmore, County Westmeath, Ireland, and educated at Mr Brady's Classical School, Cavan. He entered the Diocesan Seminary of Navan in 1846, followed by the College of the Propaganda in Rome, and was ordained a priest in 1852. The following year he was posted to South Australia, arriving in Adelaide in May 1853. In the reshuffle that attended the death of Bishop Patrick Geoghegan in 1864, he was appointed Administrator Apostolic. He was appointed Vicar General by Geoghegan's successor, Bishop Laurence Sheil, whom he accompanied to the provincial synod in Sydney, where Smyth was elected secretary.

He was an effective preacher and a sound administrator, taking over the duties of the bishop during Sheil's several absences. He was loved by those of his faith and respected by the general population. In 1869 he was the recipient of an impressive ceremony at the bishop's house on West Terrace, where he was presented with a testimonial and gold snuff box, made by the Adelaide jeweller C. E. Firnhaber, (Note: Charles Edward Firnhaber (c. 1805 – 25 July 1880) in Adelaide from 1847; had a shop at 123 Hindley Street. A competitor to the much better known J. M. Wendt.) containing 50 gold sovereigns.

He became seriously ill and died after learning of the death of his father. The Office of the Dead and Requiem Mass were held in his memory at the Cathedral and his remains interred at the West Terrace Cemetery. He requested that his only headstone would be a simple unadorned cross. A series of meetings was held to raise funds for a memorial to this man whose greatest concern was the poor orphans. It is likely this took the form of a portrait, executed by John A. Upton.
