= Jan Smit =

Jan Smit may refer to:

- Jan Smit (physicist) (born 1943), Dutch theoretical physicist
- Jan Smit (singer) (born 1985), Dutch pop music and schlager singer
- Jan Smit (footballer) (born 1983), Dutch footballer
- Jan Smit (paleontologist) (born 1948), Dutch paleontologist
- 19140 Jansmit, asteroid named after the paleontologist

== See also ==
- Jan Schmidt (disambiguation)
- Jan Smith, American music producer
- Jan Smuts, South African statesman
