= John Smith (cricketer, born 1924) =

English cricketer

Personal information
- Full name: John Westwood Rowley Smith
- Born: 28 July 1924; Clarendon Park, Leicestershire, England
- Died: 12 December 1991 (aged 67); Bruntingthorpe, Leicestershire, England
- Batting: Right-handed
- Role: Wicket-keeper

Domestic team information
- Years: Team
- 1950–1955: Leicestershire

Career statistics
Competition	First-class
Matches	3
Runs scored	5
Batting average	1.66
100s/50s	0/0
Top score	4
Catches/stumpings	1/1
- Source: Cricinfo, 3 March 2012

John Westwood Rowley Smith (28 July 1924 – 12 December 1991) was an English cricketer. Smith was a right-handed batsman who fielded as a wicket-keeper. He was born at Clarendon Park, Leicestershire.

Smith made his first-class debut for Leicestershire against the touring West Indians in 1950. He made two further first-class appearances for Leicestershire, against Nottinghamshire in the 1950 County Championship, and Oxford University in 1955. He scored 5 runs in his three first-class appearances, while behind the stumps he took a single catch and made a single stumping.

He died at Bruntingthorpe, Leicestershire on 12 December 1991.
