= John Smith (archdeacon of Llandaff) =

Welsh Anglican priest

John Smith, DCL was a Welsh Anglican priest in the 16th century.

Smith was educated at the University of Oxford. He held the living at Shepperton. He was an advocate of Doctors' Commons; and was Archdeacon of Llandaff until 1564.
