= John Smyth (footballer) =

Irish footballer

Personal information
- Full name: John Michael Smyth
- Date of birth: 28 April 1970 (age 56)
- Place of birth: Dundalk, Ireland
- Position: Full back

Youth career
- Dundalk

Senior career*
Years	Team	Apps	(Gls)
1987–1990	Liverpool	0	(0)
1990–1991	Burnley	0	(0)
1991–1992	Wigan Athletic	8	(0)
1992–1993	Limerick	27	(4)
1993–1996	Glenavon	50	(5)
1996–????	Ballymena United	?	(?)
Total		85	(9)
- * Club domestic league appearances and goals

John Michael Smyth (born 28 April 1970) is an Irish former professional footballer. He played as a full back and made eight appearances in the Football League for Wigan Athletic.
