= John Smythe =

John Smythe may refer to:

== Politicians ==
- John Smythe (High Sheriff of Kent), MP for Aylesbury and Hythe
- John Smythe (MP for Buckingham) (c.1599–1640), MP for Buckingham, 1626
- John Smythe (MP for Richmond) (died 1599/1600), MP for Richmond

== Others ==
- John Smythe (field hockey) (born 1989), Canadian field hockey player
- John Smythe (playwright), involved with the establishment of Nindethana Theatre in Melbourne, Australia, in 1971
- John Smythe (screenwriter) of The Search for Animal Chin (1987)
- John H. Smythe (1844–1908), United States ambassador to Liberia
- John Henry Clavell Smythe (1915–1996), Sierra Leone Creole, Royal Air Force member and lawyer
- Sir John Smythe (soldier) (c.1532–1607), English soldier, diplomat and military writer.
- Sir John Smythe, 3rd Baronet (died 1737) of the Smythe baronets
- Sir John Smythe, 8th Baronet (1827–1919) of the Smythe baronets

== See also ==
- John Smyth (disambiguation)
- John Smith (disambiguation)
