= John Smith (antiquary) =

Scottish antiquarian and Gaelic scholar

- Born: 1747; Argyllshire
- Died: 26 June 1807; Campbeltown
- Occupations: Antiquarian and Gaelic scholar

John Smith (1747 – 26 June 1807) was a Scottish antiquarian and Gaelic scholar.

== Biography ==
Smith was born in 1747 at Croft Brackley in the parish of Glenorchy in Argyllshire. He studied for the ministry at the university of St. Andrews, and was licensed by the presbytery of Kintyre on 28 April 1773. On 18 October 1775 he was ordained as a minister at Tarbert, and in 1777 he was presented by John, duke of Argyll, to the parish of Kilbrandon, as assistant and successor to James Stewart. In 1781, he was translated to the highland church at Campbeltown, and in 1787 received the honorary degree of D.D. from the University of Edinburgh. He died at Campbeltown on 26 June 1807. In 1783 he married Helen M'Dougall, who died on 6 May 1843. By her he had two sons, John and Donald, and three daughters.

Smith was an accomplished Gaelic scholar, and took part in translating the scriptures into Gaelic, besides publishing Gaelic translations of Alleine's ‘Alarm to the Unconverted,’ Joseph Watts's Catechism, and other small religious works. He also revised a metrical version of the Psalms in the same tongue, which was used in the southern highlands. His other works include: 1. ‘Gaelic Antiquities,’ Edinburgh, 1780, 4to; this work contained an English translation of Gaelic poems, some of which purport to be by Ossian [q. v.]; French and Italian versions of Smith's translation were made in 1810 and 1813 respectively. 2. ‘View of the Last Judgement,’ Edinburgh, 1783, 8vo; 4th edit. London, 1847. 3. ‘Sean Dana, or Ancient Poems of Ossian, Orran, Ulann, &c.’ Edinburgh, 1787, 8vo. 4. ‘Summary View and Explanation of the Writings of the Prophets,’ Edinburgh, 1787, 12mo; ed. by Peter Hall, London, 1835, 12mo. 5. ‘Life of St. Columba, from the Latin of Cummin and Adamnan,’ Edinburgh, 1798, 4to. 6. ‘General View of the Agriculture of the county of Argyll,’ 1798, 8vo. 8. ‘An Affectionate Address to the Middling and Lower Classes on the present Alarming Crisis,’ Edinburgh, 1798, 12mo. 9. ‘Lectures on the Nature and End of the Sacred Office,’ Glasgow, 1808, 8vo. He also edited Robert Lowth's ‘Isaiah,’ London, 1791, 12mo, and wrote the article on the parish of Campbeltown for Sinclair's ‘Statistical Account.’
