= Arthur Smith (cricketer, born 1857) =

English cricketer

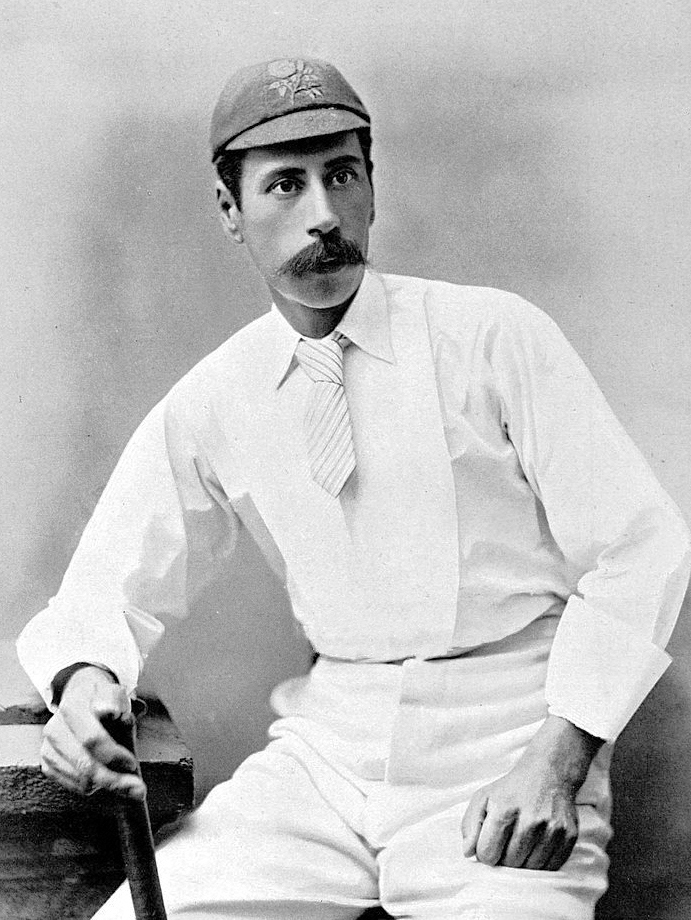

Personal information
- Full name: Arthur Price Smith
- Born: 3 December 1857; Ruddington, England
- Died: 3 June 1937 (aged 79); Tottenham, England
- Batting: Right-handed
- Bowling: Right-arm medium

Domestic team information
- Years: Team
- 1883: Lancashire
- 1886–1894: Nottinghamshire

Career statistics
| Competition | First-class |
|---|---|
| Matches | 52 |
| Runs scored | 1,508 |
| Batting average | 19.33 |
| 100s/50s | 2/5 |
| Top score | 124 |
| Balls bowled | 663 |
| Wickets | 44 |
| Bowling average | 15.06 |
| 5 wickets in innings | 3 |
| 10 wickets in match | 0 |
| Best bowling | 5/23 |
| Catches/stumpings | 32/– |
- Source: CricInfo, 27 April 2023

Arthur Price Smith (3 December 1857 – 3 June 1937) was an English cricketer active from 1880 to 1894 who played for Lancashire and Nottinghamshire. He appeared in 52 first-class matches as a righthanded batsman who bowled right arm medium pace. He scored 1,508 runs with a highest score of 124 and held 32 catches. He took 44 wickets with a best analysis of five for 23.
