= John Paterson Smyth =

John Paterson Smyth (1852–1932) was an Anglican priest, academic and author.

Paterson Smyth was born in Killarney on 2 February 1852. He was educated at Trinity College, Dublin. He was ordained deacon in 1880; and priest in 1881. He served curacies at Lisburn Cathedral and Harold's Cross. He was Professor of Pastoral theology at TCD from 1902 to 1907. In 1907 he emigrated to Canada. He was Rector of St George, Montreal from 1907 until 1926. He was Archdeacon of Montreal from 1924 until 1926.

He died on 14 February 1932.

== Books ==
- 1880 Our Bible in the Making
- 1896 How We Got our Bible
- 1896 How to Read the Bible
- 1902 The Bible for Home and School
- 1910 How God Inspired the Bible
- 1911 The Gospel of the Hereafter
- 1914 The Bible in the Making, In The Light of Modern Research
- 1915 The Men Who Die in Battle
- 1917 The story of St.Paul's Life and Letters
- 1920 The Ancient Documents and the Modern Bible
- 1922 A People's Life of Christ
- 1922 The Book of Genesis
- 1922 Moses and the Exodus
- 1922 Joshua and the Judges
- 1923 On the Rim of the World
- 1923 The Prophets and Kings
- 1924 God, Conscience and the Bible
