= John Y. and Emerette C. Smith House =

Historic house in Utah, United States

- U.S. National Register of Historic Places
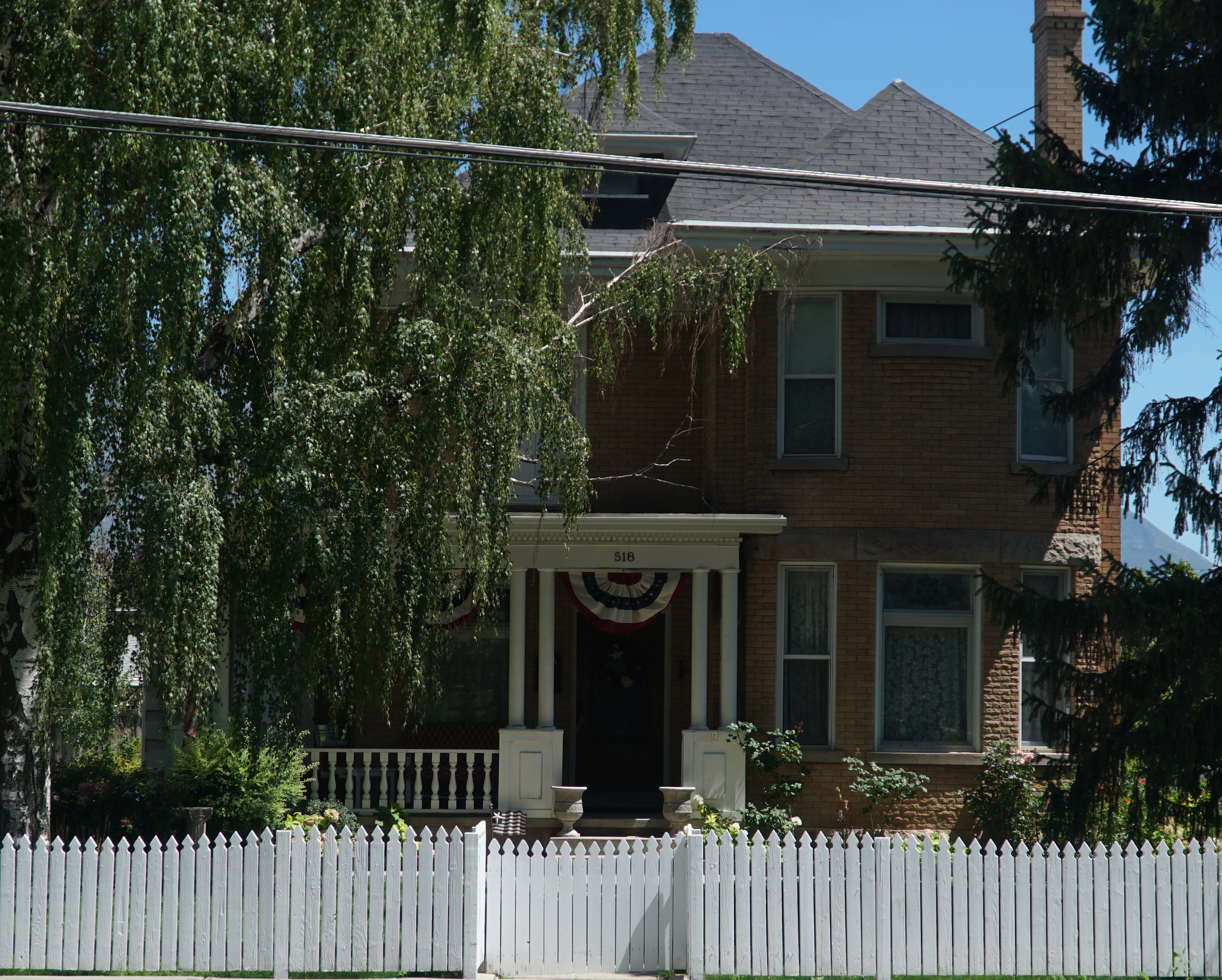

- Location within Utah Location within the United States
- Location: 518 North 100 East, Lehi, Utah
- Coordinates: 40°23′39″N 111°50′47″W
- Area: 0.3 acres (0.12 ha)
- Built: 1903
- Architectural style: Late Victorian, Classical Revival
- MPS: Lehi, Utah MPS
- NRHP reference No.: 98001452
- Added to NRHP: December 4, 1998

The John Y. and Emerette C. Smith House, at 518 North 100 East in Lehi, Utah, was built in 1903. It was listed on the National Register of Historic Places in 1998.

It was home during 1903 to 1911 of John Y. Smith, "a significant businessman, civic leader, and Utah State Senator".
