= Harry Fryer =

English cricketer

- Fryer after his playing days

Personal information
- Full name: William Harry Fryer
- Born: 29 March 1829; Greenwich, Kent
- Died: 19 January 1919 (aged 89); Loose, Kent
- Batting: Right-handed
- Bowling: Right-arm medium-fast
- Role: Wicket-keeper

Domestic team information
- Years: Team
- 1852–1872: Kent
- FC debut: 22 July 1852 Kent v Sussex
- Last FC: 12 August 1872 Kent v Sussex

Career statistics
| Competition | First-class |
|---|---|
| Matches | 88 |
| Runs scored | 1,666 |
| Batting average | 10.96 |
| 100s/50s | 0/3 |
| Top score | 67 |
| Balls bowled | 2,565 |
| Wickets | 49 |
| Bowling average | 19.89 |
| 5 wickets in innings | 1 |
| 10 wickets in match | 0 |
| Best bowling | 8/40 |
| Catches/stumpings | 73/25 |
- Source: CricInfo, 1 July 2017

William Henry Fryer (29 March 1829 – 19 January 1919), known as Harry Fryer, was an English cricketer. He was born in Greenwich in Kent in 1829 and played for Kent County Cricket Club between 1852 and 1872, initially as a wicket-keeper and later as a batsman.

Fryer made his first-class cricket debut for Kent in July 1852 against Sussex. He played 75 times for Kent as well as making appearances for a range of other teams, including the Gentlemen of Kent three times, and one appearance for England in 1855.

After losing an eye in an accident where he was thrown from a trap in 1862, Fryer continued to play cricket although he no longer kept wicket on a regular basis. He was described in his Wisden obituary as a "free and hard-hitting batsman and an excellent wicket-keeper" who was "also useful as a change-bowler". He took 8/40 for Kent against England at Lord's in 1864, the best bowling figures of his first-class career. He continued playing county cricket until 1872 when he made his final first-class appearance for Kent and continued playing for Mote Park until 1879.

He went on to be an "excellent" umpire and was considered "in every way a worthy man" by Wisden. he died at Loose near Maidstone in Kent in 1919 aged 89.

== Bibliography ==
- Carlaw, Derek (2020). Kent County Cricketers, A to Z: Part One (1806–1914) (PDF). Cardiff: ACS.
