= List of shipwrecks in June 1861 =

The list of shipwrecks in June 1861 includes ships sunk, foundered, grounded, or otherwise lost during June 1861.

== 1 June ==
List of shipwrecks: 1 June 1861
Ship	State	Description
Bondinella	Italy	The ship was run down and sunk in the Mediterranean Sea 3 nautical miles (5.6 km) north west of Capen Senas, Beylik of Tunis with the loss of four of her crew.
Endeavour	United Kingdom	The ship collided with another vessel and sank off Europa Point, Gibraltar with the loss of two of her crew. She was on a voyage from Sulina, Ottoman Empire to Queenstown, County Cork.
Lord Hungerford	United Kingdom	The ship foundered. Her crew were rescued.

== 2 June ==
List of shipwrecks: 2 June 1861
Ship	State	Description
Bullfinch	United Kingdom	The full-rigged ship was destroyed by fire at Morant Bay, Jamaica. She was on a voyage from Jamaica to London.
Concord	United Kingdom	The ship ran aground on the Horsen Bank, off Texel, North Holland, Netherlands.
Endeavour	United Kingdom	The ship collided with another vessel and foundered off Europa Point, Gibraltar with the loss of two of her crew. Survivors were rescued by the brig Fortuna (Spain). Endeavour was on a voyage from Sulina, Ottoman Empire to Queenstown, County Cork.
Sylph	United Kingdom	The barque foundered in the Bay of Bengal. Her crew were rescued by Indiana (United States).
William Henry	Confederate States of America	The 95-ton sternwheel paddle steamer struck a snag and sank on the Arkansas River at Fort Smith, Arkansas.

== 3 June ==
List of shipwrecks: 3 June 1861
Ship	State	Description
Demerara	United Kingdom	The brig foundered in the Atlantic Ocean 100 nautical miles (190 km) east of Jamaica. Her crew survived. She was on a voyage from Liverpool, Lancashire to Havana, Cuba.
Quadruple	(United Kingdom of Great Britain and Ireland) Bermuda	The schooner was wrecked at the mouth of the Ozame River, Saint Domingo.

== 4 June ==
List of shipwrecks: 4 June 1861
Ship	State	Description
Canadian	United Kingdom	The passenger steamer struck an iceberg and sank in the Strait of Belle Isle 4 nautical miles (7.4 km) north of Cape Bauld, Newfoundland, with the loss of 35 lives. Her 266 survivors were rescued by four French fishing vessels.
Nestor	United Kingdom	The brigantine was wrecked on the Haisborough Sands, in the North Sea off the coast of Norfolk. Her crew were rescued. She was on a voyage from South Shields, County Durham to Rochester, Kent.
Paragon	United Kingdom	The barque ran aground in the Strait of Malacca. She was on a voyage from Singapore, Straits Settlements to Mauritius. She was refloated and put back to Singapore in a leaky condition.

== 5 June ==
List of shipwrecks: 5 June 1861
Ship	State	Description
Elizabeth	United Kingdom	The brig ran aground on the East Scar Rock, on the coast of Yorkshire. She was on a voyage from Sunderland, County Durham to Hamburg. She was refloated and resumed her voyage.

== 6 June ==
List of shipwrecks: 6 June 1861
Ship	State	Description
Emily Farnum	United Kingdom	The ship ran aground and was damaged on the Catuama Reefs, 30 nautical miles (56 km) north of Pernambuco, Brazil. She was on a voyage from The Downs to Calcutta, India. She was refloated with assistance from the tug Camaragibe (Brazil and towed in to Pernambuco.
Greenville	United States	The 105-ton sternwheel paddle steamer struck a snag and sank in the Wabash River at Terre Haute, Indiana.
J. S. Parsons	Confederate States of America	The full-rigged ship was abandoned in the Pass A L'Outre. She was on a voyage from New Orleans, Louisiana to Liverpool, Lancashire, United Kingdom.
Mamaranack	Confederate States of America	The full-rigged ship was abandoned in the Pass A L'Outre. She was on a voyage from New Orleans to Liverpool.
Thomas Mahony	United Kingdom	The ship ran aground at Dungarvan, County Waterford. She was on a voyage from Dungarvan to Liverpool, Lancashire.

== 8 June ==
List of shipwrecks: 8 June 1861
Ship	State	Description
Jaffa	United Kingdom	The ship was wrecked near Nantucket, Massachusetts. Her crew were rescued. She was on a voyage from Sydney, Nova Scotia, British North America to New York.
Merlin	United Kingdom	The ship foundered off Cape Horn, Chile. Her crew were rescued by Coquimbo (United Kingdom). Merlin was on a voyage from Valparaíso, Chile to Plymouth, Devon.
Queen of the Wave	United Kingdom	The ship was wrecked at Ganjam, India. She was on a voyage from Madras to Ganjam.
Somerset	Unknown	American Civil War, Union blockade: The schooner, a blockade runner, was captured in Breton's Bay on the Maryland side of the Potomac River and burned on the Virginia shore by the armed screw steamer USS Resolute (United States Navy).

== 9 June ==
List of shipwrecks: 9 June 1861
Ship	State	Description
Glynn	United Kingdom	The ship foundered off the Longships Lighthouse. She was on a voyage from Newport, Monmouthshire to San Sebastián, Spain.

== 10 June ==
List of shipwrecks: 10 June 1861
Ship	State	Description
HMS Hydra	Royal Navy	The Hydra-class sloop ran aground in the West Indies. Subsequently refloated, repaired and returned to service.

== 11 June ==
List of shipwrecks: 11 June 1861
Ship	State	Description
Berse	France	The brigfoundered in the Atlantic Ocean (41°14′N 10°04′W). Her crew were rescued by Delia (United Kingdom). Berse was on a voyage from Swansea, Glamorgan, United Kingdom to Barcelona, Spain.
Osprey	United Kingdom	The steamship was wrecked off Porth Neigwl, Caernarfonshire.
Trois Maries	United Kingdom	The schooner foundered in the North Sea off Orfordness, Suffolk, United Kingdom. Her crew were rescued.

== 12 June ==
List of shipwrecks: 12 June 1861
Ship	State	Description
Jane	United Kingdom	The barque was run down and sunk in the River Foyle by the schooner Moggie Lorimer. Her crew were rescued by the schooner.
Sandwich Bay	United Kingdom	The ship ran aground on the Filla Till Rocks, on the coast of Yorkshire. She was on a voyage from the River Tyne to Beer, Devon.

== 13 June ==
List of shipwrecks: 13 June 1861
Ship	State	Description
Amalia	United Kingdom	The ship ran aground on the Goodwin Sands, Kent. She was on a voyage from Liverpool, Lancashire to Narva, Russia. She was refloated on 15 June and assisted in to Ramsgate, Kent.
Celerity	United Kingdom	The sloop ran aground on the Foreness Rock, off Margate, Kent.
New Friendship	United Kingdom	The schooner struck a rock and sank at the mouth of the Rance. She was on a voyage from London to Dinan, Côtes-du-Nord, France.
Star of Hope	United States	The clipper was abandoned off the Cape of Good Hope, Cape Colony. She was on a voyage from Liverpool to Calcutta, India.

== 15 June ==
List of shipwrecks: 15 June 1861
Ship	State	Description
Alarm	United Kingdom	The tug suffered a boiler explosion at Bristol, Gloucestershire and sank with the loss of one of her crew.
Christiana Kean	United States	American Civil War: The schooner was run aground, boarded, and burned by Confederate forces in rowboats one-half mile (0.8 km) from the Virginian bank of the Potomac River off Machodoc Creek, below Mathias Point opposite Cedar Point.
Guadalete	United Kingdom	The ship was driven ashore at Deal, Kent. She was on a voyage from London to Constantinople, Ottoman Empire. She was refloated the next day and taken in tow for London.
Hersilia	United Kingdom	The ship was wrecked at "Poondy", India. She was on a voyage from London to Calcutta, India.
John Fowler	United Kingdom	The brig ran aground on the Walpole Rocks, on the Kent coast. She was refloated and taken in to Ramsgate, Kent.
Lawson	United Kingdom	The ship caught fire at Toulon, Var, France.
Swallow	United Kingdom	The ship was run down and sunk in the North Sea off Flamborough Head, Yorkshire by the steamship Lord Raglan (United Kingdom) with the loss of a crew member. Survivors were rescued by Lord Raglan. Swallow was on a voyage from North Shields, County Durham to Havre de Grâce, Seine-Inférieure.
Therese	France	The schooner was driven ashore at Mundesley, Norfolk. United Kingdom.
Zarah	United Kingdom	The ship ran aground in the River Thames at Rosherville, Kent. She was on a voyage from London to the Clyde. She was refloated and resumed her voyage.

== 16 June ==
List of shipwrecks: 16 June 1861
Ship	State	Description
Berenica	United Kingdom	The barque was wrecked on Robben Island, Cape Colony with the loss of seven lives. She was on a voyage from an English port to Cape Town, Cape Colony.
Bittern	United Kingdom	The steamship ran aground on the Westplaat, in the North Sea off the Dutch coast. She was on a voyage from Liverpool, Lancashire to Rotterdam, South Holland, Netherlands. She was refloated and completed her voyage.
Cataract	United States	The 393-ton screw steamer burned at Erie, Pennsylvania, with the loss of four lives.
Luigi	Kingdom of Lombardy–Venetia	The ship ran aground on the Corton Sands, in the North Sea off the coast of Suffolk, United Kingdom. She was on a voyage from Antwerp, Belgium to Newcastle upon Tyne, Northumberland, United Kingdom. She was refloated with assistance and taken in to Lowestoft, Suffolk.
Old England	United Kingdom	The Mersey Flat was holed by her anchor and sank at Flint. She was on a voyage from Liverpool to Saltney, Cheshire.

== 17 June ==
List of shipwrecks: 17 June 1861
Ship	State	Description
Eagle Speed	United States	The full-rigged ship was wrecked on the Orestes Shoal, at the mouth of the Bassein River. Her crew were rescued. She was on a voyage from Bassein, India to Falmouth, Cornwall, United Kingdom.
Thorbeke	Danzig	The schooner was driven ashore south of Landskrona, Sweden. She was on a voyage from Danzig to Leith, Lothian, United Kingdom. She was refloated on 19 June and taken in to Landskrona for repairs.

== 18 June ==
List of shipwrecks: 18 June 1861
Ship	State	Description
Agatha Maria	Netherlands	The barque was wrecked on the Carang Bolang Rocks, off Tilatjap, Netherlands East Indies. All on board were rescued. She was on a voyage from Tilatjap to Amsterdam, North Holland.
Asiatic	United Kingdom	The ship foundered in Algoa Bay with the loss of fifteen of her 24 crew. She was on a voyage from Akyab, Burma to Falmouth, Cornwall.
Cora Anderson	Confederate States of America	The 658-ton sidewheel paddle steamer struck a snag and sank in Lake Providence.
Livingstone	United Kingdom	The ship was wrecked at Saint John's, Newfoundland, British North America.

== 19 June ==
List of shipwrecks: 19 June 1861
Ship	State	Description
Francis	United Kingdom	The ship was wrecked on Mallorca, Spain. She was on a voyage from Cagliari, Sardinia, Italy to Bristol, Gloucestershire.

== 22 June ==
List of shipwrecks: 22 June 1861
Ship	State	Description
Fieval	Netherlands	The schooner ran aground at Narva, Russia.
Maria	Russian Empire	The lighter ran aground at Narva.
Port Mulgrave	United Kingdom	The steamship was driven ashore north of Staithes, Yorkshire. She was refloated the next day and put back to Newcastle upon Tyne, Northumberland.
Sarah and Eliza	United Kingdom	The ship was driven ashore at Bridlington, Yorkshire. She was on a voyage from Hull, Yorkshire to Newcastle upon Tyne. She was refloated and taken in to Bridlington.

== 23 June ==
List of shipwrecks: 23 June 1861
Ship	State	Description
John Smith	United Kingdom	The ship ran aground at Bolderāja, Russia. She was on a voyage from Liverpool, Lancashire to Bolderāja.
Traveller	United Kingdom	The smack sank 8 nautical miles (15 km) south of Methil, Fife. Her crew were rescued. She was on a voyage from Leith, Lothian to Montrose, Forfarshire.
Traviata	Brazil	The barque was severely damaged by an onboard explosion at Cardiff, Glamorgan, United Kingdom. She was on a voyage from Cardiff to Lisbon, Portugal.

== 24 June ==
List of shipwrecks: 24 June 1861
Ship	State	Description
Baltic	United Kingdom	The steamship was wrecked on Veckmansground, off Dagö, Russia. All 26 people on board survived. She was on a voyage from Hull, Yorkshire to Reval, Russia.
Fantome	United Kingdom	The barque struck the Billyrock, off Port William, Falkland Islands. She was refloated and taken in to Stanley in a severely leaky condition.
Gloria Deo	(flag) Denmark	The ship was wrecked on Dagö. She was on a voyage from Palermo, Sicily, Italy to Kronstadt, Russia.
Jessie	United Kingdom	The ship ran aground in the Tigris. She was on a voyage from Newcastle upon Tyne, Northumberland to Lisbon. She was later refloated.
Keystone	Confederate States of America	American Civil War: The 69-ton sidewheel paddle steamer was burned on the Mississippi River at Arkansas City, Arkansas.
Senator	United Kingdom	The ship was destroyed by fire in the River Thames, at Millwall, Essex.
Traveller	United Kingdom	The ship sank in the North Sea off Methil, Fife. Her crew survived.
Workington	United Kingdom	The ship was wrecked on "New Island", County Antrim.

== 25 June ==
List of shipwrecks: 25 June 1861
Ship	State	Description
Commerce	United Kingdom	The whaler was crushed by ice and sank in the Davis Straits. Her crew survived.

== 27 June ==
List of shipwrecks: 27 June 1861
Ship	State	Description
Atmosphere	United Kingdom	The clipper ran into another vessel at Bombay, India and was damaged. She was on a voyage from Bombay to London.

== 28 June ==
List of shipwrecks: 28 June 1861
Ship	State	Description
Lochnagar	United Kingdom	The ship ran aground on the Red Island Reef. She was on a voyage from Gibraltar to Quebec City, Province of Canada, British North America. She broke up on 19 July.
Susan Hincks	United States	The ship ran aground on the Brake Sand, off the coast of Kent, United Kingdom She was refloated and towed in to The Downs.

== 29 June ==
List of shipwrecks: 29 June 1861
Ship	State	Description
Hanno	Portugal	The ship was wrecked 3 nautical miles (5.6 km) south of Pernambuco, Brazil. Her crew were rescued. She was on a voyage from Lisbon to Pernambuco.
Louisa	France	The ship capsized in the English Channel 10 nautical miles (19 km) south west of Hastings, Sussex, United Kingdom. Her six crew were rescued. She was on a voyage from Sunderland, County Durham to Les Sables-d'Olonne, Vendée.
Prince of Wales	United Kingdom	The ship was wrecked 70 nautical miles (130 km) south of Pernambuco with the loss of all hands. She was on a voyage from the Clyde to Montevideo, Uruguay.

== 30 June ==
List of shipwrecks: 30 June 1861
Ship	State	Description
Passenger	Unknown	American Civil War: The sloop sank in the Potomac River, but other details are unclear. Sources disagree on whether she was a Confederate vessel captured and destroyed by the screw steamer USS Resolute (United States Navy), with Resolute capturing one person aboard her, or a Union vessel that capsized, with Resolute rescuing one survivor.

== Unknown date ==
List of shipwrecks: Unknown date June 1861
Ship	State	Description
Baltic	United Kingdom	The steamship was wrecked on Veckman's Ground, off Hiiumaa, Russia. All on board were rescued. She was on a voyage from Hull, Yorkshire to Kronstadt, Russia.
Baton Rouge	Confederate States of America	The 65-ton sternwheel paddle steamer burned on the Tennessee River in Tennessee.
Bedouin	United Kingdom	The ship was abandoned in the Atlantic Ocean before 13 June. She was on a voyage from New York, United States to Galway.
Carl	Norway	The ship was driven ashore near "Kloven". She was on a voyage from the River Tyne to Tromsø. She was refloated.
Chieftain	United Kingdom	The steamship was wrecked on a rock off Coll, Inner Hebrides before 15 June.
Coronet	United Kingdom	The ship was driven ashore on Hunting Island, South Carolina, Confederate States of America. She was on a voyage from Savannah, Georgia, Confederate States of America to Liverpool, Lancashire.
Elizabeth Wilhelmine	Sweden	The ship capsized in Sutton Pool. She was on a voyage from Stockholm to Plymouth, Devon, United Kingdom.
Gambia	United Kingdom	The steamship was driven ashore at Lowestoft, Suffolk before 22 June.
Hubet	Norway	The brig became waterlogged at "Margum", Cape Breton Island, Nova Scotia, British North America between 4 and 13 June.
Josepha	United Kingdom	The ship was driven ashore at Garrucha, Spain. She was consequently condemned.
Lord Raglan	United Kingdom	The ship sprang a leak and was abandoned in the Atlantic Ocean. Her crew were rescued.
Mary Fry	United Kingdom	The ship was driven ashore in the Saint Lawrence River at Richelieu, Province of Canada, British North America. She was on a voyage from Montreal, Province of Canada to Liverpool.
New Friendship	United Kingdom	The ship struck a rock and sank in the Rance before 17 June. She was on a voyage from London to Dinan, Côtes-du-Nord, France.
Parsee	United Kingdom	The ship ran aground on the Bognor Rocks, in the English Channel off the coast of Sussex. She was on a voyage from London to Poti, Russia.
Rollo	United States	The fishing schooner left Halifax, Nova Scotia in mid June for the Seal Island Grounds and vanished. Lost with all 8 crew.
Sparrow	United Kingdom	The barque was abandoned in the Atlantic Ocean before 6 June. Her crew were rescued by Allendale (United Kingdom.
Sympathy	United Kingdom	The sloop ran aground on the Hauxley Sand, on the coast of Northumberland and sank. She was on a voyage from Goole, Yorkshire to Alnmouth, Northumberland.
Unidentified vessel	Confederate States of America	American Civil War: Confederate forces scuttled the vessel in the Warwick River in Virginia.
