= John Smith (Australian footballer) =

Australian rules footballer

Personal information
- Full name: John Charles Smith
- Born: 19 April 1933
- Died: 15 April 2026 (aged 92)
- Original team: Caulfield
- Height: 173 cm (5 ft 8 in)
- Weight: 77 kg (170 lb)

Playing career^{1}
Years	Club	Games (Goals)
1952	St Kilda	4 (2)
- ^{1} Playing statistics correct to the end of 1952.

John Charles Smith (19 April 1933 – 15 April 2026) was an Australian rules footballer who played with St Kilda in the Victorian Football League (VFL).
