= John Smalman Smith =

John Smalman Smith (23 August 1847 – 1913) was a British judge who served as Chief Justice of the Colony of Lagos in 1889 and as Vice President of the Royal African Society. His judicial work contributed to the growth of Nigerian law in the closing years of the nineteenth century.

== Life ==
Smith was born on 23 August 1847 the son of Samuel Pountney Smith, an architect and Mayor of Shrewsbury. He was educated at Shrewsbury School and St John's College, Cambridge. He was called to the bar in 1872 and joined the Oxford Circuit. Later on, he was a junior counsel to the Society of Architects. In 1883, Smith was appointed as a Puisne judge of the Eastern Province of the Gold Coast colony, with Lagos as the centre of the district. During his tenure the court expanded its office on Tinubu Square. In 1886, Lagos was made a separate colony and Smith became judge of the Vice Admiralty Court, he later became the Chief Justice in 1889.

Some of his notable cases during the end of the nineteenth century include Voigt and Co v Yesufu Bada, Glassie v Leigh, Omoniregun v Sadatu and Olawoyin v Coker. In the Olawoyin v Coker and Sadatu cases, the judgement dealt with interpretations of Yoruba customary laws in the ownership of land and family house.
