= Sir John Smith, 1st Baronet =

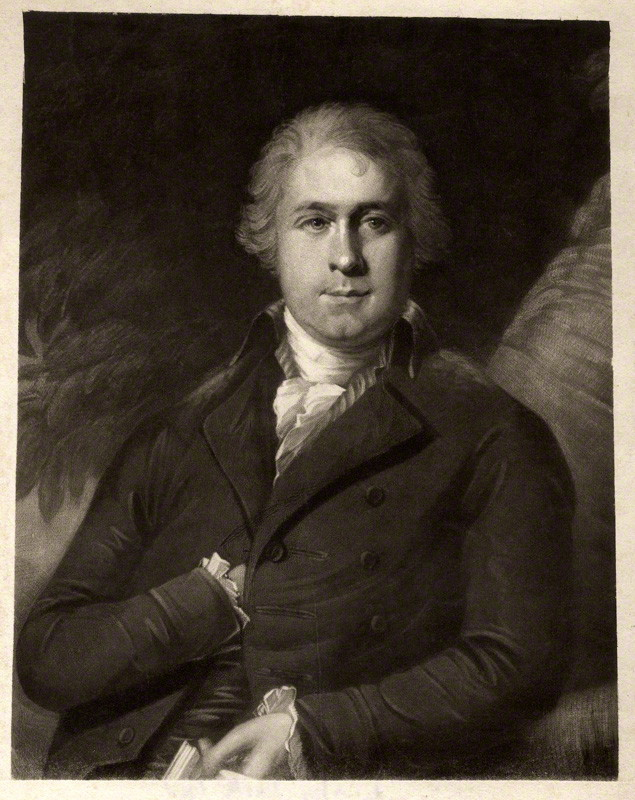
Sir John Smith, 1st Baronet by Lemuel Francis Abbott.

Sir John Smith, 1st Baronet FRS FSA (1744 – 1807) was High Sheriff of Dorset in 1772 and the progenitor of the Smith-Marriott Baronetcy.

== Biography ==
Smith, who resided in Sydling St Nicholas in Dorset, was born in 1744. He was the son of Henry Smith of New Windsor and Mary, the daughter of John Hill.

He was elected a Fellow of the Society of Antiquaries of London and a Fellow of the Royal Society in 1773. He was made a baronet on 1 June 1774 and served as High Sheriff of Dorset in 1772.

He first married Elizabeth, daughter of Robert Curtis of Wilsthorpe, Lincolnshire, on 18 February 1768. She died on 13 February 1796 and he later married Anna Eleonora, eldest daughter of Thomas Morland of Court Lodge in Kent. Books from Smith's library were sold in London in 1928. His grandson, Sir William Marriott Smith-Marriott, 4th Baronet, added the name and arms of Marriott on 15 February 1801.

== Coat of arms ==
Blason : "A fess cotised between three martlets in chief point the hand of Ulster (Smith) impaling on an escutcheon of pretence Paly of six a fess countercompony (Curtis). Crest: A greyhound sejant collared and lined. Motto: Semper fidelis".

Baronetage of Great Britain
New creation	Baronet (of Sydling St Nicholas); 1774–1807	Succeeded by John Wyldbore Smith
