= John David Smith (Upper Canada politician) =

Loyalist and Upper Canada politician

- Born: October 1786; New York City, United States
- Died: March 1849 (aged 62)
- Occupation(s): Businessman, Politician
- Known for: Serving in the Legislative Assembly of Upper Canada
- Children: Sidney, James, John Shuter

John David Smith (October 1786 – March 1849) was a businessman and political figure in Upper Canada.

He was born in New York City in 1786, the son of Elias Smith, a United Empire Loyalist. He came to the site of what is now Port Hope with his family in 1797. His father and Jonathan Walton built a sawmill and gristmill there which formed the basis for the community that developed there. Smith was a merchant and miller and served as magistrate. He was elected to the Legislative Assembly of Upper Canada for Durham in 1828 and served until 1830.

Three of his sons, Sidney, James and John Shuter, later served in the Legislative Assembly for the Province of Canada.
