= God's Squad =

Christian motorcycle club

- Abbreviation: GSCMC
- Founded: 1971
- Founded at: Sydney, Australia
- Type: Christian motorcycle club
- Purpose: Christian ministry supporting the members and families of the motorcycle scene and those on its fringes
- Region served: Worldwide
- Key people: Rev. Dr. K. John Smith
- Website: https://www.gscmc.com

God's Squad Christian Motorcycle Club (GSCMC), is a Christian patch club motorcycle club established in the early 1970s in Sydney, Australia. The club expanded to a broader base and missional style in Melbourne, Australia under the leadership of the Rev. Dr. Kevin John Smith in Melbourne after 1972 and continues to operate to the present day.

== History ==
The club is one of the oldest Christian backpatch clubs in the world. The club primarily ministers among outlaw motorcycle clubs and associated groups. Since its birth out of the counter culture Jesus Movement of the late 1960s, it has continued to operate to the present day. The club's history is documented in John Smith's autobiography, On The Side Of The Angels. John Smith died in March 2019.

As of 2020, GSCMC has chapters in Australia, New Zealand, United Kingdom, Norway, Finland, Ireland, Ukraine, Germany, Netherlands, Lithuania, Michigan US, Sweden, Poland, Estonia and Switzerland.
