= John Shuter Smith =

John Shuter Smith (c. 1813 – January 18, 1871) was a lawyer and political figure in Canada West.

He was born in Port Hope around 1813, the son of John David Smith. He served as mayor of Port Hope in 1852, from 1854 to 1855 and in 1868. He represented the East riding of Durham in the Legislative Assembly of the Province of Canada from 1861 to 1866.

His brother Sidney, also a lawyer, served as postmaster general for the Province of Canada and was a member of the Legislative Assembly and Legislative Council.

He was roundly criticized by contractor John Fowler, lessee of the Millbrook-Peterborough branch of the Port Hope, Lindsay and Beaverton Railway for underhanded dealings.
