= John Sidney Smith (legal writer) =

British legal writer

John Sidney Smith (1804–1871) was a legal writer.

John Sidney Smith, son of John Spry Smith of 9 Woburn Square, London, was born in 1804, and held a situation in the six clerks' office in the court of chancery until 23 October 1842, when the establishment was abolished. He soon after entered Trinity Hall, Cambridge, and graduated B.A. 1847 and M.A. 1850. He was called to the bar at the Middle Temple on 7 November 1845, and practised in the Court of Chancery.

He died at Sidney Lodge, Wimbledon, Surrey, on 14 January 1871.

== Publications ==
- A Treatise on the Practice of the Court of Chancery, 2 vols, 1834–35. (7th edition, with Alfred Smith, 1862; American edition, Philadelphia, 1839)
- A Handbook of the Practice of the Court of Chancery, 1848 (2nd edit. 1855)
- A Treatise on the Principles of Equity, 1856.
