= James Smith House =

James Smith House may refer to:

in the United States (by state)

- James Smith House (Davenport, Iowa), listed on the National Register of Historic Places (NRHP)
- James Smith Homestead, Kennebunk, Maine, listed on the NRHP in York County, Maine
- James Smith House (Needham, Massachusetts), NRHP-listed
- James Smith House (Grandin, Missouri), listed on the NRHP in Carter County, Missouri
- James Alexander Smith and Elmarion Smith Barn and Lame-Smith House, Halsey, Oregon, NRHP-listed

== See also ==
- Smith House (disambiguation)
