= Kennebunk (disambiguation) =

Kennebunk may refer to multiple things located in the U.S. state of Maine:

- Kennebunk, Maine, a town
  - Kennebunk (CDP), Maine, census-designated place within the town
  - West Kennebunk, Maine, census-designated place
- The Kennebunk River
