= The Enlightened Capitalists =

- Author: James O'Toole
- Language: English
- Subject: Capitalism; Business ethics Corporate social responsibility
- Genre: Non-fiction
- Publisher: HarperBusiness
- Publication date: 2019
- Publication place: United States
- Media type: Print
- Pages: 592
- ISBN: 978-0-06-288024-6

The Enlightened Capitalists: Cautionary Tales of Business Pioneers Who Tried to Do Well by Doing Good is a 2019 non-fiction book by James O'Toole about business leaders who attempted to reconcile profit with social responsibility. Published by HarperBusiness in February 2019, the book examines British and American examples over two centuries.

O'Toole builds his argument through case studies of Robert Owen, William Lever, James Cash Penney, Levi Strauss, William C. Norris, Herb Kelleher, Bill Gore, Anita Roddick and Tom Chappell, treating each as evidence of potential and vulnerability of "enlightened" business leadership.

== Synopsis ==
The book follows business leaders in Britain and the United States who tried to build companies that were profitable and socially responsible at the same. O'Toole argues that humane labor policies, environmental commitments, and stakeholder-oriented management rarely outlasted their founders. Once later managers took over and shareholder pressure mounted, these practices tended to erode.

He starts with early industrial reformers like Robert Owen and William Lever, and then moves through twentieth-century figures such as James Cash Penney and Levi Strauss and ends with more recent leaders such as William C. Norris, Herb Kelleher, Bill Gore, Anita Roddick and Tom Chappell.

== Reception ==
Kirkus Reviews called the book "a tapestry of remarkable characters, high drama, and entertaining story arcs for leaders of businesses large and small". Publishers Weekly described it as a "comprehensive and thoughtful study" of the relationship between business and benevolence. The Financial Times said the book treated its subjects as examples of how socially minded business leadership could fail yet still remain a source of hope. The Wall Street Journal also positively reviewed the book.
