= Rebecca Field Jones =

American artist

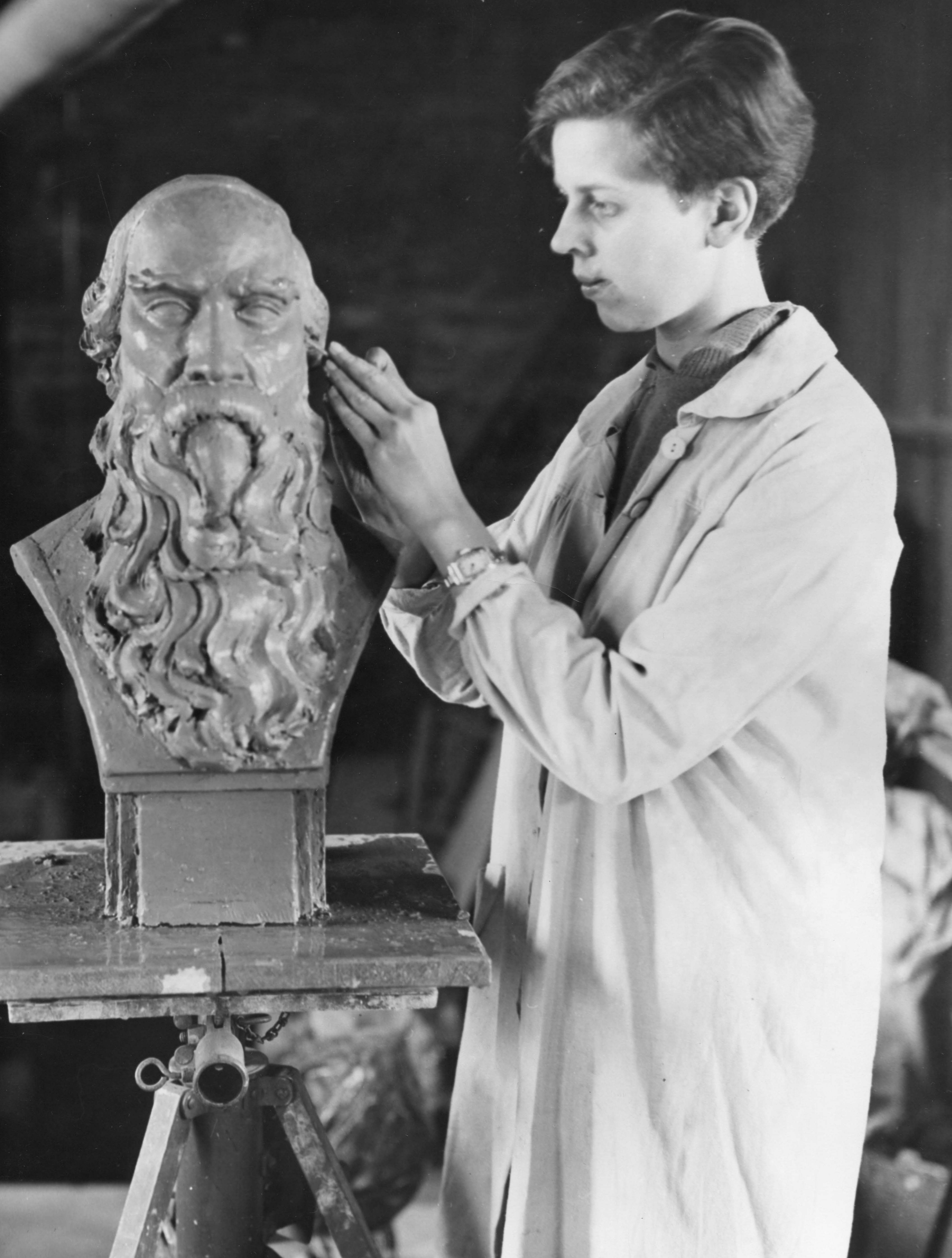
- Rebecca Field Jones sculpting a bust of Henry Barnard
- Born: Rebecca Field; March 13, 1905; Montague, Massachusetts
- Died: April 16, 2002 (aged 97); Windsor, Vermont
- Known for: Sculptor, Educator

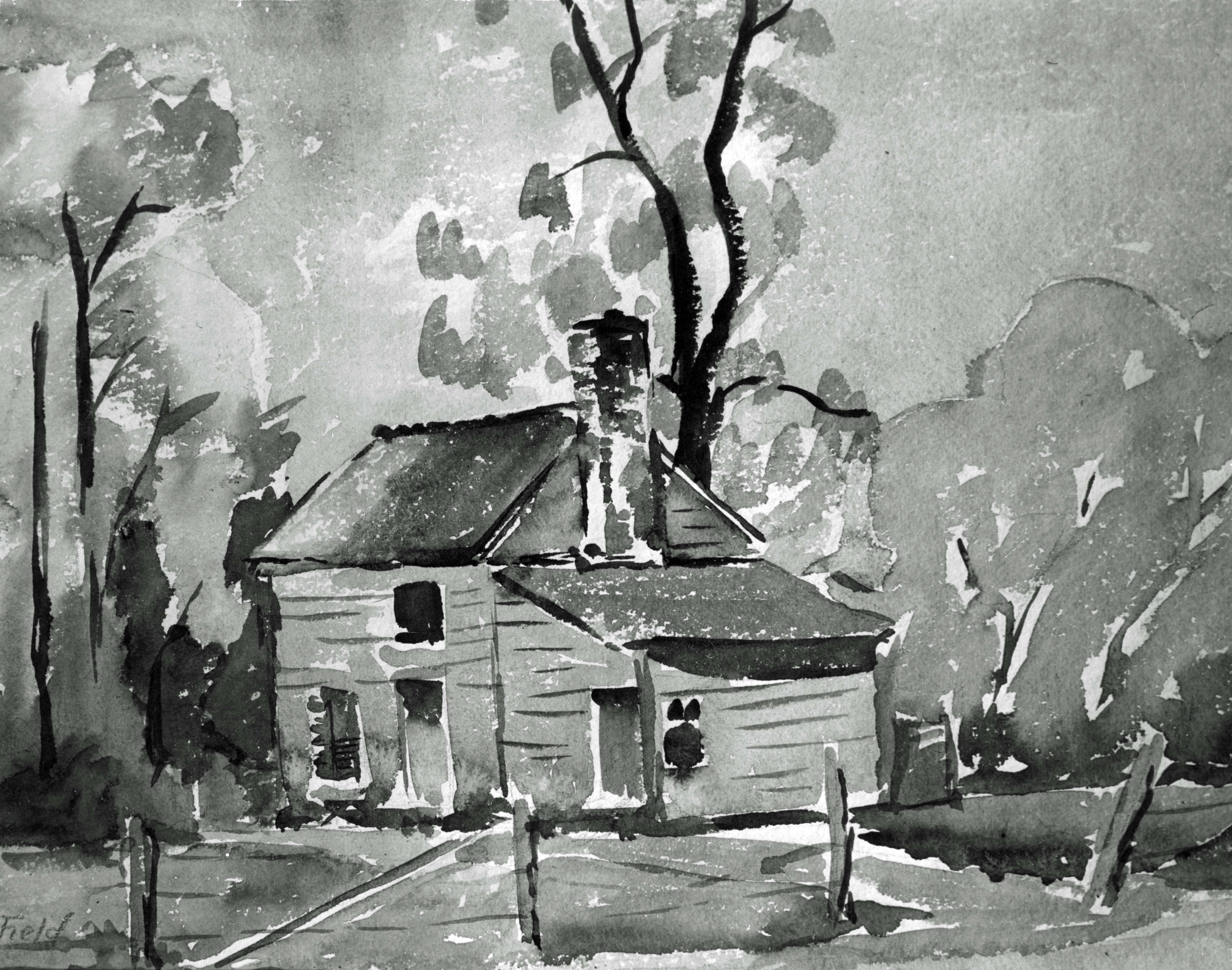
untitled, ca. 1935-1943

Rebecca Field Jones (1905–2002) was an American artist who worked for the Works Progress Administration (WPA) and went on to found the West Hartford Art League.

== Biography ==
Jones née Field was born in Montague, Massachusetts, on March 13, 1905. She briefly attended Massachusetts Agricultural College (now the University of Massachusetts Amherst) and the Massachusetts Art School before studying in art in Munich, Germany. In 1934 she cofounded the West Hartford Art League along with Getrude Patterson Bezanker. The organization was located in red brick schoolhouse at 87 Mountain Road. From 1935 through 1938 she worked for the Public Works of Art Project and its successor, the Federal Arts Project. She then worked for the Public Works Administration's drafting department.

In 1941 she married fellow artist Frederic Edward Jones. She taught at the West Hartford Art League, Miss Porter's School, and the Oxford School. She was a member of the Hartford Society of Women Painters. In the 1970s Jones relocated to New Hampshire. She died on April 16, 2002, in Windsor, Vermont.
