= Kate Chappell =

American painter

- Born: Katherine Pope Cheney; 1942 (age 83–84); Hartford, Connecticut, U.S.
- Education: Chatham College; Sarah Lawrence College; Sorbonne; University of Southern Maine
- Occupations: Artist businesswoman manufacturer
- Spouse: Tom Chappell

Kate Cheney Chappell (born 1942) is an American businesswoman, artist, and manufacturer. She co-founded personal-care product manufacturer Tom's of Maine in 1970 as well as wool clothing manufacturer Ramblers Way in 2010 with her husband Tom Chappell.

== Biography ==
Katherine Pope Cheney was born in 1942 in Hartford, Connecticut. Her parents were George Wells Cheney, Jr., an insurance executive, and Mary Frances Pope, a trained artist. She is descended from the founders of Manchester's Cheney Brothers Silk Company, brothers Ward, Rush, and Frank. It became the largest silk mill in the country at the time, and the family opened other textile mills including one for velvet. The Cheney family included accomplished artists; John Cheney was an engraver, and Seth Wells Cheney created portraits. A number of Seth's works were donated to the Boston Museum of Fine Arts. The Cheney home was turned into a museum which is managed by the Manchester Historical Society.

Chappell is a 1963 graduate of Oxford School in West Hartford, Connecticut. She attended Chatham College and Sarah Lawrence College before she and her husband, Tom Chappell, moved to Kennebunk, Maine in 1968 to raise their family. As of 2010, Kate and Tom share a summer home on Monhegan, Maine. Chappell became the vice president of Tom's of Maine, starting the business jointly with her husband after they developed a saccharine-free, natural toothpaste for their children. It was the first natural toothpaste to receive the American Dental Association's seal of acceptance. Her artistic skills were used in overseeing the packaging, advertising and media for the company.

She also attended the Sorbonne and the University of Southern Maine, where she graduated summa cum laude in 1983 with an A.B. degree in Communications after an 18-year hiatus from college.

Chappell founded the Kate Cheney Chappell '83 Center for Book Arts at the University of Southern Maine, which was launched in 2008, and serves as Chairwoman on the Advisory Board. Her teacher, professional book artist and USM faculty member Rebecca Goodale, was chosen to be the program coordinator. The Center provides an area for workshops, exhibits, and discussions by artists from across the United States regarding artwork pertaining to the illustration of books.

In 2006, a controlling 84% stake in Tom's of Maine was purchased by Colgate-Palmolive for $100 million in 2006.

In 2010, Chappell and her husband founded Ramblers Way, an organic wool apparel company. The clothing is made from American Rambouillet wool, silk thread, and vegetable dyes, and spinning, weaving, and knitting is done in East coast states to keep the sourcing local and sustainable. The silk thread used is a reminder of the Cheney mills, which Chappell recalled still functioning in her youth when she would go to the Cheney Hall remnant room with her mother.

== Recognition ==
In 2009, Chappell was one of five women to receive the Deborah Morton award from the University of New England that year. It is presented to "outstanding women who have achieved high distinction in their careers and public service or whose leadership in civic, cultural or social causes has been exceptional".

== Artwork ==
Chappell's artwork has been acquired and exhibited by a number of institutions, including the New York Public Library, the Portland Museum of Art, and the New Britain Museum of American Art, where her piece "Explosion of Amphibian Deformities" was selected by Director Douglas Hyland for inclusion in the "Director’s Favorites: 1999–2015" showing. The Kingswood Oxford School commissioned a sculpture from her called "All Life Interrelated", and it was installed at their science building in September 2015.
