= Wedding Cake House =

Wedding Cake House may refer to:

- Wedding Cake House (Kennebunk, Maine)
- Wedding Cake House (Providence, Rhode Island)
- Wedding Cake House (New Orleans), on St. Charles Avenue, New Orleans, Louisiana
