= Lower Alewive Historic District =

Historic district in Maine, United States

- U.S. National Register of Historic Places
- U.S. Historic district
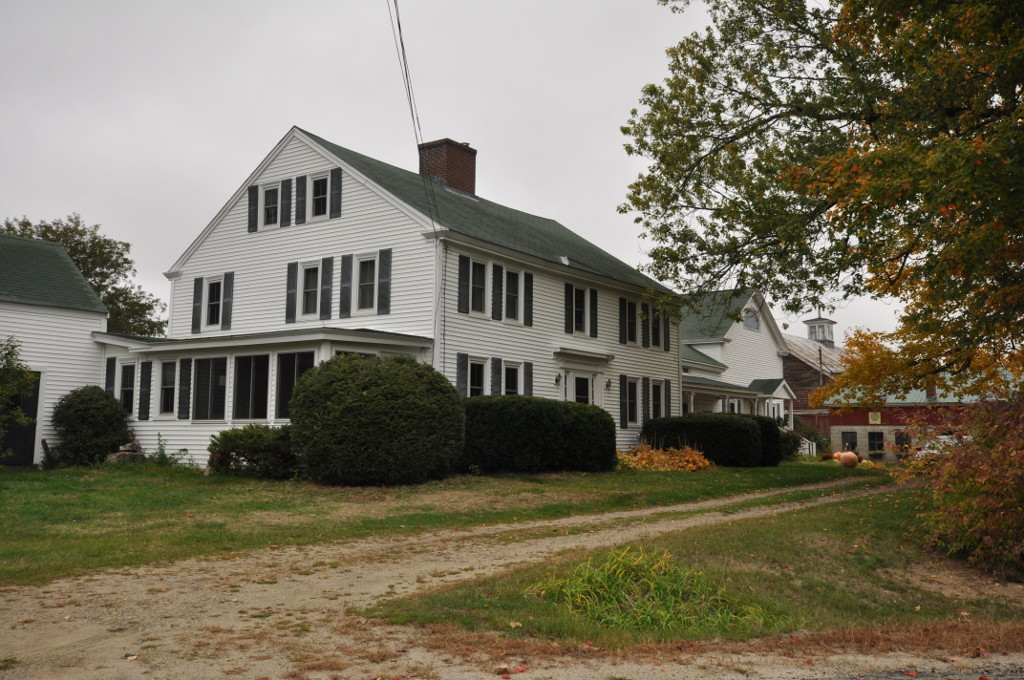

- Location within Maine Location within the United States
- Location: Kennebunk, Maine
- Coordinates: 43°25′50″N 70°33′46″W
- Area: 208 acres (84 ha)
- Built: 1790
- Architectural style: Federal, Greek Revival
- NRHP reference No.: 94000178
- Added to NRHP: March 24, 1994

The Lower Alewive Historic District encompasses a rural agricultural landscape in northwestern Kennebunk, Maine. It includes four farm properties, all originally laid out in the 1750s, between the Kennebunk River to the north, and a street now variously named Russell Farm Road, Emmons Road Extension, and Winnow Hill Lane to the south. The district was listed on the National Register of Historic Places in 1994.

The inland area known as "Alewive" of the coastal community of Kennebunk was first settled in the 1750s. All four of the farm properties in this district were laid out at that time, extending along what became known as Emmons Road (two of the farms were owned by members of the Emmons family), running east and then south from what is now Maine State Route 35 to the village center of Kennebunk.

The westernmost farm was that of James Smith, who acquired its 50 acres (20 ha) in 1753. Although his house has traditionally been ascribed that date, analysis of its construction methods gives a date of about 1800. The house may be a substantial enlargement of an older building. The property remained in agricultural use by Smith descendants into the early 20th century.

Just east of the Smith farm is what is now known as the Walker-Russell Farm. Its 40 acres (16 ha) were purchased by Samuel Littlefield, Jr., in 1753, and it was purchased by John Walker in 1797. The house, a handsome Federal style structure, was probably built in Walker soon afterward. Eliphet Walker sold the farm in 1874 to Cyrus Russell, who added Italianate-style bracketing and other period decorative features to the house. There are several outbuildings, including a barn that may date to the early 19th century.

The Seth Emmons Farm is east of the Walker Russell Farm. Its land, 54 acres (22 ha), was also purchased in 1753 by Samuel Littlefield, Jr., but was bought by John Taylor, who built the first buildings on the property. It was acquired by Seth Emmons in 1840, who tore down Taylor's house and built the present Greek Revival building in its place. It also has later Italianate embellishments, and a barn that is also of early 19th century origin.

The Collins Emmons Farm is the easternmost of the four properties. Its 50 acres (20 ha) were purchased by Stephen Larrabee in 1753, and was purchased by Seth Emmons and his two sons in 1852. The elder son Collins inherited this property, while Seth T. Emmons inherited the one to the west. The house on this farm represents a significant expansion of an early Cape-style center-chimney farmstead by Collins Emmons to a larger structure with Greek Revival features.

The four adjacent farm properties represent an important element of Kennebunk's agrarian history, illustrating land use patterns of the 18th and 19th centuries.

== See also ==
- National Register of Historic Places listings in York County, Maine
