= Turney Duff =

American businessperson

- Born: 1969 (age 56–57); Cleveland, Ohio, U.S.
- Education: Ohio University
- Occupations: Businessman author
- Years active: 1994–present
- Employers: Morgan Stanley; Galleon Group
- Notable work: The Buy Side
- Website: turneyduff.com

Turney Duff (born 1969) is an American businessman, author, and former hedge fund trader. He is the author of the 2013 memoir The Buy Side: A Wall Street Trader's Tale of Spectacular Excess, which became a New York Times bestseller.

== Early life and education ==
Duff was born in Cleveland, Ohio, in 1969 and moved with his family to Kennebunk, Maine, at the age of seven. He attended Kennebunk High School and then returned to Ohio for university, graduating in 1993 from the E. W. Scripps School of Journalism at Ohio University with a degree in journalism.

== Career ==
=== Wall Street career ===
Duff moved to New York City in 1994 and, through a contact provided by his uncle, joined Morgan Stanley as a sales assistant in the firm's Private Wealth group. In 1999, he was hired by the Galleon Group, where he worked as a healthcare trader and rose to the position of managing director.

In 2001 Galleon co-founder and chief healthcare analyst Krishen Sud left the firm to launch a hedge fund called Argus Partners, and Duff joined him as a founding partner and senior trader, overseeing an approximately US$1 billion healthcare portfolio. In 2007, Duff joined J.L. Berkowitz, a firm formerly associated with Jim Cramer, as partner and senior trader. He left J.L. Berkowitz in 2009 to pursue a career in writing.

=== The Buy Side ===
In June 2013 Duff's memoir, The Buy Side: A Wall Street Trader's Tale of Spectacular Excess, was published by the Crown Publishing Group. The memoir became a bestseller and was included in The New York Times bestseller list. The memoir has been reviewed by multiple publications, including Publishers Weekly and Kirkus Reviews. In 2013, Sony Pictures acquired the film and television rights to the book.

=== Media work ===
In January 2014 Duff was featured on Frontline's To Catch a Trader, a PBS documentary examining the insider trading scandal at the Galleon Group. Between 2014 and 2017, he was a featured commentator on the CNBC series The Filthy Rich Guide, a program about the spending habits of the wealthy people. During the same period, he wrote opinion columns for CNBC on Wall Street culture and personal finance. From the show's premiere in 2016 through 2019, Duff worked as a consultant on the Showtime drama Billions during its first four seasons, advising the writers, directors, and actors, including Damian Lewis and Paul Giamatti, on the authenticity of its hedge-fund scenes.

== Selected bibliography ==
- Duff, Turney (2013). The Buy Side: A Wall Street Trader's Tale of Spectacular Excess. New York: Crown Business. ISBN 978-0-7704-3715-2.
