= James Smith Homestead =

Historic house in Maine, United States

- U.S. National Register of Historic Places
- U.S. Historic district – Contributing property
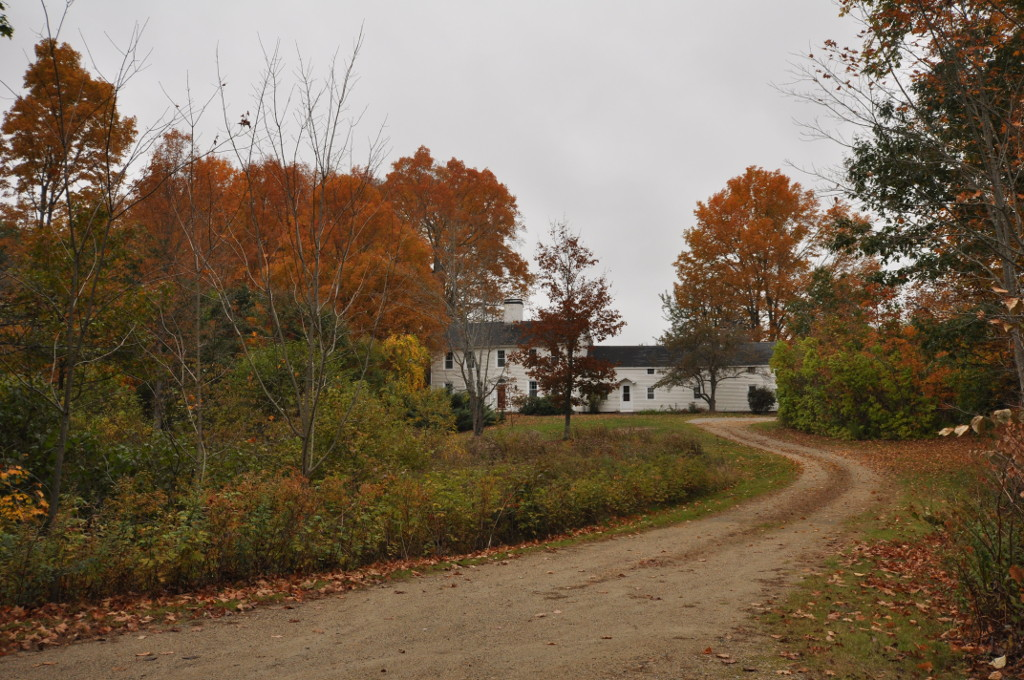

- Location within Maine Location within the United States
- Location: 5 Russell Farm Road (corner of ME 35), Kennebunk, Maine
- Coordinates: 43°25′56″N 70°33′54″W
- Area: 1 acre (0.40 ha)
- Built: 1753
- Architectural style: Georgian
- Part of: Lower Alewive Historic District (ID94000178)
- NRHP reference No.: 82001887

Significant dates
- Added to NRHP: February 4, 1982
- Designated CP: March 24, 1994

The James Smith Homestead is a historic house on 5 Russell Farm Road in Kennebunk, Maine. Built in 1753, it is one of the few surviving mid-18th century inland farmhouses in the town. It was listed on the National Register of Historic Places in 1982, and is included in the Lower Alewive Historic District.

== Description and history ==
The James Smith Homestead is set back from the road on the north side of Russell Farm Road, just north of its junction with Maine State Route 35. Russell Farm Road, now a short road, was laid out in the mid-18th century as part of Emmons Road, which was truncated by the construction of Interstate 95. The house is a 2 1/2-story wood-frame structure, five bays wide, with a central chimney, clapboard siding, and a granite foundation. The main facade, oriented roughly southwest, is symmetrical, with a center entrance set in an arched opening, flanked by pilasters and topped by a gabled pediment. A 1 1/2-story ell extends to the right, and a barn stands further to the east.

James Smith purchased 50 acres (20 ha) of land in this area from Caleb Littlefield in 1753, and built a house soon afterward. The present house has traditionally been ascribed a construction date of 1753, but architectural analysis has revealed that it was more likely built around 1800. It is possible the house incorporates elements of the original structure. The house was owned by four generations of the family. The Lower Alewive area was one Kennebunk's major agricultural areas in the 18th century.

== See also ==
- National Register of Historic Places listings in York County, Maine
