= Kennebunk Savings Bank =

Kennebunk Savings is a mutual savings organization that was founded in 1871 in Kennebunk, Maine. Kennebunk Savings serves York County and Seacoast New Hampshire with branch locations in Southern Maine and Seacoast New Hampshire. Kennebunk Savings is a full service financial institution that offers personal and business banking products including deposit accounts, mortgages, home equity loans and credit lines; business, life, home and auto insurance through Kennebunk Savings Insurance.

Kennebunk Savings donates 10% of its after-tax income to nonprofit organizations through its Community Promise. Since 1994, the company has given over $14 million to charitable causes that enhance its communities and improve quality of life for the people within them. As part of the Community Promise, Kennebunk Savings created the Spotlight Fund to focus on a single, critical issue facing the community each year (Kennebunk Savings in the Community, 2019).

== History ==
Lex Meagher became president and chief executive officer of Kennebunk Savings on January 1, 2025.

In 2005 Wolf Financial Group joined Kennebunk Savings and was renamed, Kennebunk Financial Services. In 2015 it was renamed again and became Kennebunk Savings Insurance.
