= Kingswood Oxford School =

School in West Hartford, Connecticut, US

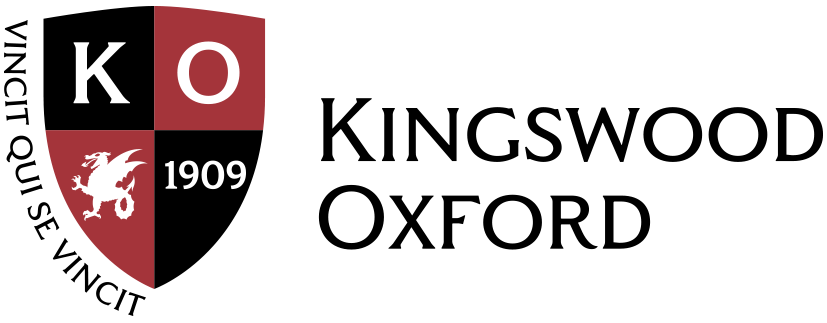
- School Logo Motto: Vincit qui se vincit (One conquers by conquering oneself)

Location
- 170 Kingswood Road; West Hartford, Connecticut 06119; United States; 41°45′35″N 72°44′02″W

Information
- Type: Day school
- Established: 1909 (117 years ago)
- CEEB code: 070890
- Headmaster: Thomas Dillow (2018- )
- Faculty: 75
- Enrollment: 508 students
- Student to teacher ratio: 7-to-1
- Colors: Crimson and black
- Athletics: 26 interscholastic sports 62 interscholastic teams in Middle and Upper Schools
- Athletics conference: Founders League
- Mascot: Wyvern
- Website: www.kingswoodoxford.org

Kingswood Oxford School is a private school located in West Hartford, Connecticut instructing day students in grades 6 through 12 with a college preparatory curriculum. Originally two separate schools, Kingswood School and Oxford School for boys and girls respectively, KO is now a co-educational institution. KO employs 75 teachers as well as administrative, library, building and grounds, and culinary staff.

== History ==
Kingswood Oxford School was formed by the merger of two independent schools: Oxford School for girls, founded in 1909 by Mary Martin, and Kingswood School, founded by George R.H. Nicholson in 1916. Martin and Nicholson founded their schools on the premise that "wise parents know they must share with teachers the shaping of the minds and character of young people" as first expressed by the American Country Day School Journal in the early 1900s.

== Academics ==
KO students continually score well on Advanced Placement exams; the school is one of the top achievers on AP tests among Connecticut high schools.

The school has also been voted the best prep school in the West Hartford area for the ninth consecutive time in the May 2017 edition of the Hartford Courant.

Kingswood Oxford students also continually score well within the National Merit Scholarship Program.

== Extracurricular activities ==
Student groups at KO range from a newspaper (the KO News), a literary magazine called epic and a student-run yearbook to multicultural and community-service organizations.

KO's debate and public speaking club, the Forensic Union, has been consistently winning tournaments in the Debating Association of New England Independent Schools for over twenty years and has placed highly in international competitions including the World Individual Debating and Public Speaking Championship.

== Notable alumni and faculty ==
- Tim Brennan, lead guitarist of the Dropkick Murphys
- E. Michael Burke, former president of the New York Yankees, the New York Knicks, and Madison Square Garden
- Anne Burr, actress
- Kate Cheney Chappell, co-founder of Tom's of Maine
- John Conklin, theater designer
- Dominick Dunne, investigative journalist
- Brendan Gill, writer for The New Yorker
- Marion Coats Graves (faculty in 1910), first president of Sarah Lawrence College
- Katharine Hepburn, actress
- Katharine Houghton, actress and playwright
- Jared Jordan, professional basketball player
- Nancy Lublin, founder and former CEO of Crisis Text Line, former CEO of DoSomething, creator of Dress for Success
- Colin McEnroe, columnist and radio personality
- John O'Hurley, actor and former host of Family Feud
- William A. Tomasso, construction executive
- Isaiah Wright, professional football player
