= White Barn Inn =

- Interactive map of White Barn Inn

Restaurant information
- Established: 1973 (53 years ago)
- Owner: Auberge Resorts Collection
- Location: 37 Beach Avenue, Kennebunk, Cumberland County, Maine, 04043, United States
- Coordinates: 43°21′20″N 70°28′47″W
- Website: Official website

White Barn Inn is a hotel and restaurant in Kennebunk, Maine, United States. Established in 1973 and located on Beach Avenue, the restaurant utilizes a remodeled barn, while the adjacent main inn building dates from the 1860s. It has a AAA 4 Diamond rating, having previously reached 5 Diamonds.

The business is part of the Auberge Resorts Collection.
