= James Smith House (Needham, Massachusetts) =

Historic house in Massachusetts, United States

- U.S. National Register of Historic Places
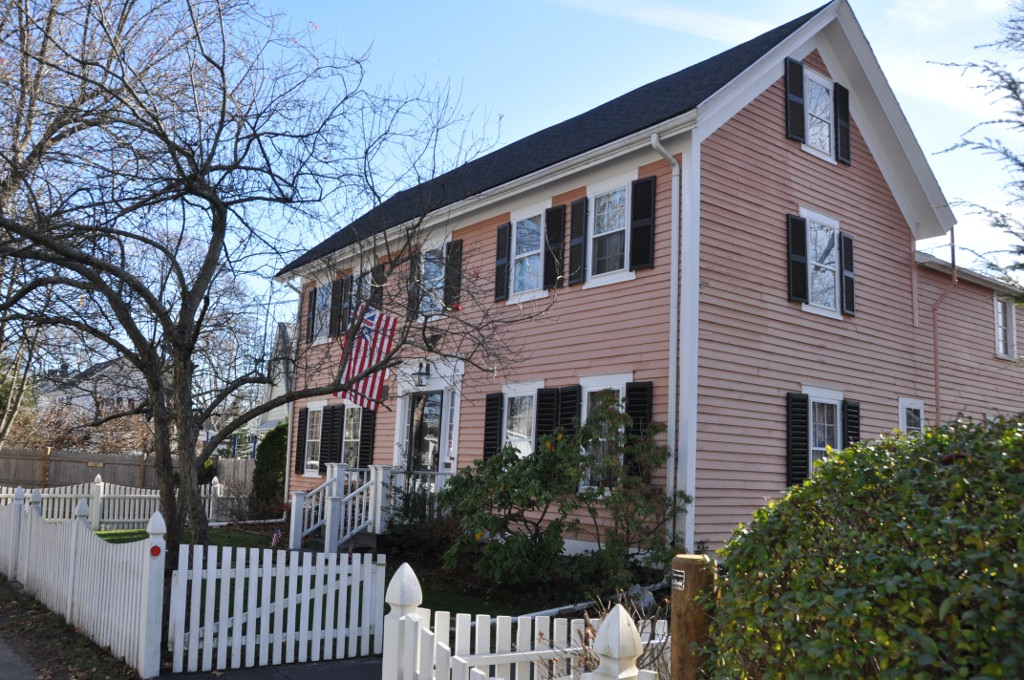
- Captain James Smith House

- Location within Massachusetts Location within the United States
- Location: 706 Great Plain Avenue, Needham, Massachusetts
- Coordinates: 42°16′49″N 71°13′36″W
- Built: 1730
- Architectural style: Greek Revival, Federal
- NRHP reference No.: 86001845
- Added to NRHP: August 21, 1986

The James Smith House is a historic colonial house in Needham, Massachusetts, United States. It is a 2 1/2-story wood-frame structure, five bays wide, with a side gable roof and clapboard siding. Its front facade is symmetrical, with a center entrance with a Greek Revival surround consisting of flanking sidelight windows and a flat entablature above. The house was built c. 1727–28 by James Smith, a recent immigrant from Ireland. The house is one of the oldest in Needham.

The house was listed on the National Register of Historic Places in 1986.

== See also ==
- National Register of Historic Places listings in Norfolk County, Massachusetts
