= Wedding Cake House (Kennebunk, Maine) =

Historic house in Maine, United States

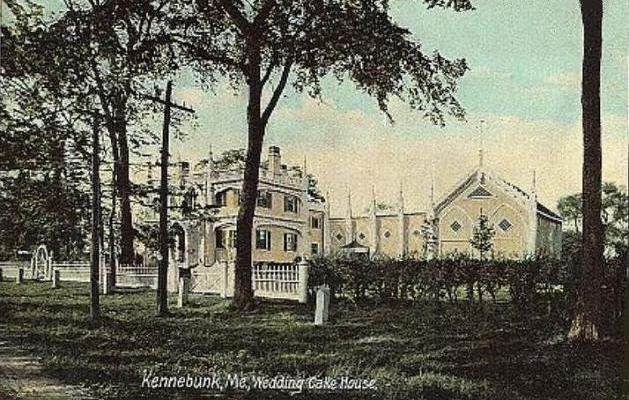
- The Wedding Cake House in 1912
- Interactive map of the Wedding Cake House area

General information
- Architectural style: Federal with Carpenter Gothic trim
- Location: Kennebunk, Maine, United States
- Coordinates: 43.3817°N 70.5169°W
- Construction started: 1825, 1852
- Completed: 1825, 1856
- Client: George W. Bourne

Technical details
- Structural system: two-story brick house (painted yellow) with wooden trim, attached wooden shed and barn

Design and construction
- Architect: George W. Bourne
- Engineer: unknown

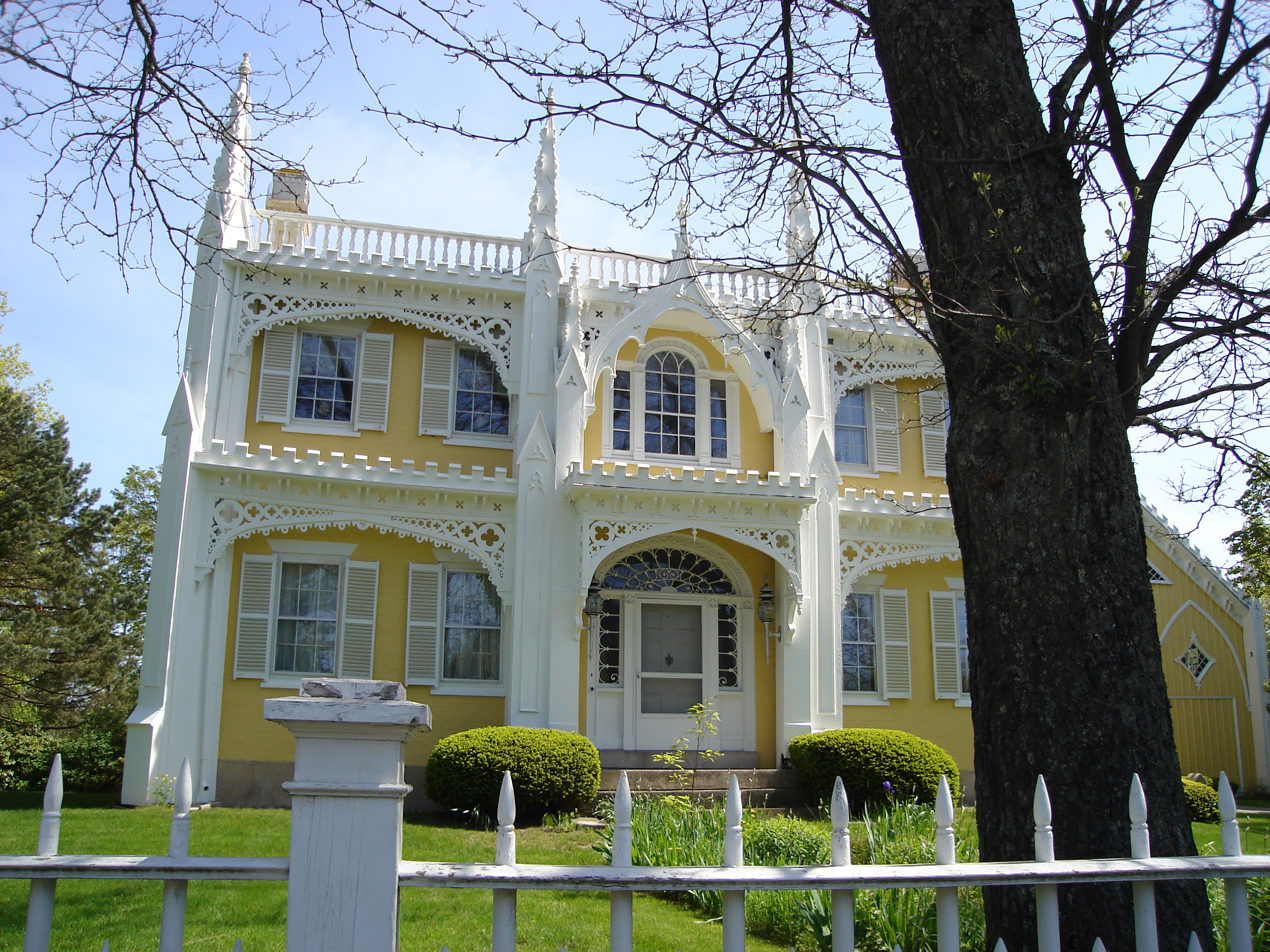
The Wedding Cake House in 2006

Once called the "most photographed house in the state" of Maine, the Wedding Cake House, known formally as the George W. Bourne House, is a historic house located at 104 Summer Street in Kennebunk, Maine. The home was built in 1825 by shipbuilder George W. Bourne (1801–1856), who later built a frame barn which he connected to the main house with a carriage house. In 1852, the barn caught fire and the carriage house was demolished to keep the fire from spreading to the house. Bourne, who during a European tour had been impressed by the Gothic beauty of the cathedral at Milan, rebuilt the carriage house and barn in what later came to be known as Carpenter Gothic style. Using hand tools, he crafted five buttresses with pinnacles on top of each. Then in order to tie the new structures in with the existing house, he added six buttresses with pinnacles to the house and then joined them together with intricate woodwork. His only help in doing this was Thomas Durrell, an apprentice ship's carpenter. Bourne spent the rest of his life adding to these embellishments. It has been said of Bourne: "The highly skilled carpenter knew no limits to his skill."

== Name ==
The "Wedding Cake" name was applied to the house due to its wedding cake-like appearance. Legend developed that the busy Bourne, a sea captain, had done the carpentry work to atone for not having taken his bride, Jane, on a proper honeymoon. This was not the case.

== Restoration ==
In 1983, the home was purchased from the last descendant of George Bourne to live there by Mary Burnett and her daughter Anne. The women completely restored the mansion, completing the work in 1984.

In fall 2005, the home was opened to the public for the first time by the previous owners Jimmy Barker and Kenneth W. Douglas as a fundraiser for Hurricane Katrina relief.

The home has been in the process of restoration since 2019 now owned by Barker's nephew Hunt Edwards and niece Lela Cason.
