= Kennebunk (CDP), Maine =

Kennebunk, Maine
- Census-designated place
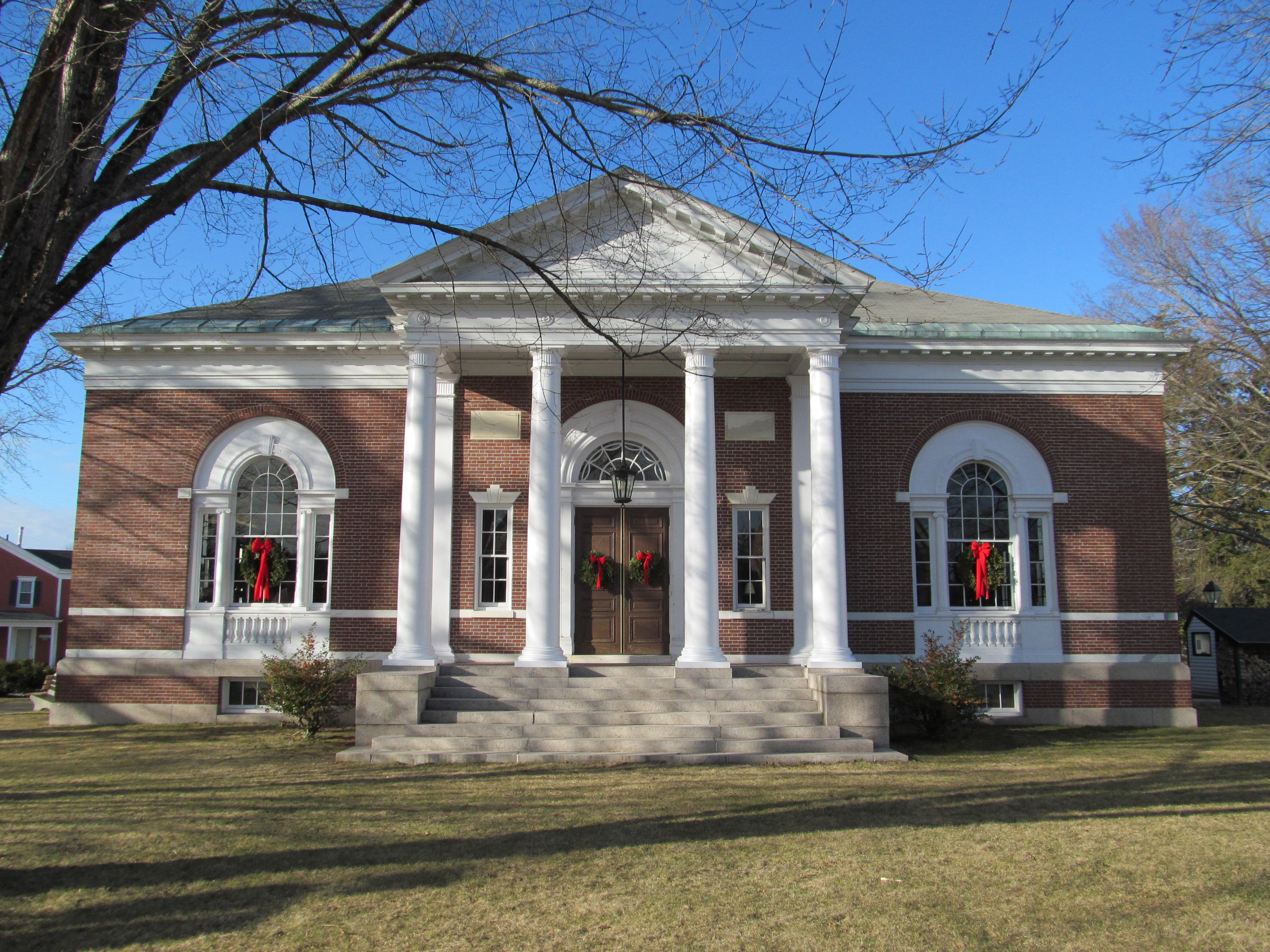
- Kennebunk Free Library

- Location within the state of Maine
- Coordinates: 43°22′38″N 70°32′38″W
- Country: United States
- State: Maine
- County: York

Area
  - Total: 6.75 sq mi (17.48 km^{2})
  - Land: 6.75 sq mi (17.48 km^{2})
  - Water: 0 sq mi (0.00 km^{2})
- Elevation: 66 ft (20 m)

Population (2020)
  - Total: 5,776
  - Density: 856.0/sq mi (330.49/km^{2})
- Time zone: UTC-5 (Eastern (EST))
  - Summer (DST): UTC-4 (EDT)
- ZIP code: 04043
- Area code: 207
- FIPS code: 23-36500
- GNIS feature ID: 2377920

Kennebunk is a census-designated place (CDP) comprising the central village in the town of Kennebunk in York County, Maine, United States. The population was 5,214 at the 2010 census, out of a total town population of 10,798. It is part of the Portland–South Portland–Biddeford, Maine Metropolitan Statistical Area.

== Geography ==
According to the United States Census Bureau, the CDP has a total area of 6.7 square miles (17.5 km^{2}), all land.

== Demographics ==
Historical population
Census	Pop.	Note	%±
2020	5,776		—
U.S. Decennial Census

As of the census of 2000, there were 4,804 people, 2,109 households, and 1,284 families residing in the CDP. The population density was 712.3 inhabitants per square mile (275.0/km^{2}). There were 2,295 housing units at an average density of 340.3 per square mile (131.4/km^{2}). The racial makeup of the CDP was 98.31% White, 0.17% Black or African American, 0.08% Native American, 0.48% Asian, 0.19% from other races, and 0.77% from two or more races. Hispanic or Latino of any race were 0.29% of the population.

There were 2,109 households, out of which 27.3% had children under the age of 18 living with them, 48.8% were married couples living together, 9.3% had a female householder with no husband present, and 39.1% were non-families. 34.0% of all households were made up of individuals, and 19.3% had someone living alone who was 65 years of age or older. The average household size was 2.22 and the average family size was 2.85.

In the CDP, the population was spread out, with 22.4% under the age of 18, 4.3% from 18 to 24, 24.4% from 25 to 44, 26.7% from 45 to 64, and 22.2% who were 65 years of age or older. The median age was 44 years. For every 100 females, there were 81.8 males. For every 100 females age 18 and over, there were 75.9 males.

The median income for a household in the CDP was $49,015, and the median income for a family was $60,885. Males had a median income of $42,206 versus $25,556 for females. The per capita income for the CDP was $26,562. About 3.6% of families and 5.4% of the population were below the poverty line, including 4.7% of those under age 18 and 6.3% of those age 65 or over.

== Education ==
The community is in the Regional School Unit 21.
