= James Smith House (Davenport, Iowa) =

Historic house in Iowa, United States

- U.S. National Register of Historic Places
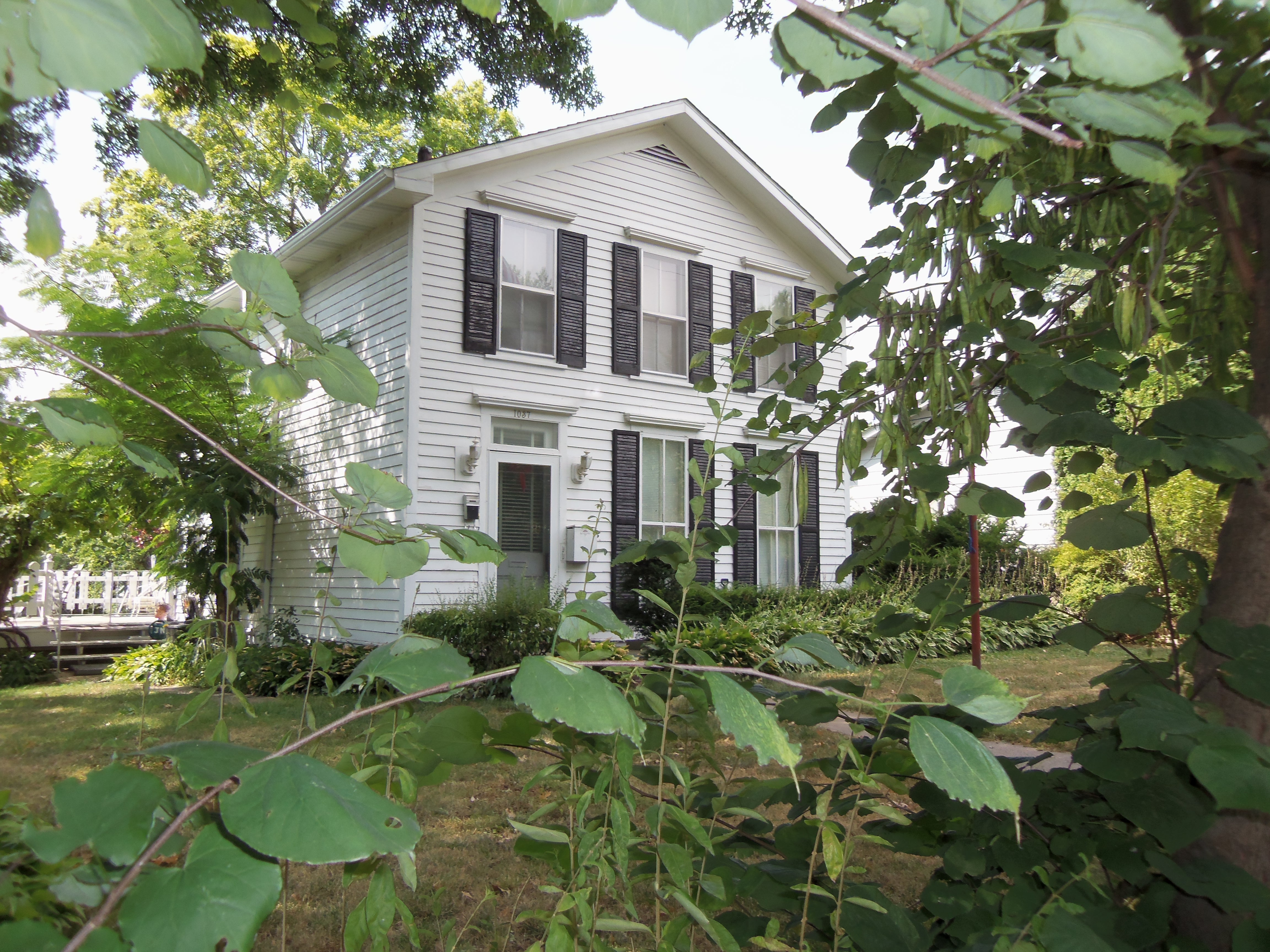

- Location within Iowa Location within the United States
- Location: 1037 E. 18th St. Davenport, Iowa
- Coordinates: 41°32′14″N 90°33′35″W
- Area: less than one acre
- Built: 1865
- Architectural style: Greek Revival
- MPS: Davenport MRA
- NRHP reference No.: 84001563
- Added to NRHP: July 27, 1984

The James Smith House is a historic building located on the east side of Davenport, Iowa, United States. It has been listed on the National Register of Historic Places since 1984.

== History ==
The house was built in 1865. James and Maria Smith began living here in 1878, and were more than likely not the first residents of the house. James worked as a laborer and after his death his wife and sister continued to live here.

== Architecture ==
The rectangular two-story, three-bay, front gable, frame house follows the form of the Greek Revival style. It is a prototype from which a Vernacular house style known as the "McClelland" was most likely derived. While the basic form is the same, the proportions of this house are wider and the roof pitch is lower. The structure also exhibits influence from the Italianate style, which is found in the projecting cornices and tall, narrow front windows on the main floor. A front porch, which was extant in 1910, has subsequently been removed.
