= Tom Chappell =

American businessman

Thomas Matthew Chappell (born 1943) is an American businessman and manufacturer who co-founded Tom's of Maine in 1970, and Ramblers Way, a wool clothing company, with his wife, artist Kate Chappell.

Chappell graduated from the Moses Brown School in Providence, Rhode Island, in 1961, and from Trinity College in Hartford, Connecticut, with a B.A. in English in 1966. Chappell and his wife, cofounder Kate Chappell, moved to Kennebunk, Maine, in 1968 to raise their family. Tom and Kate now share a summer home on Monhegan, Maine.

Chappell earned a Masters in Theology at Harvard Divinity School in 1991. He is active in the Episcopal Church of Maine, was a deputy to the 1991 and 1994 Triennial General Conference of the Episcopal Church, and was a member of the Environmental Stewardship Team of the national Episcopal Church. He is active in many cultural and philanthropic organizations, among them the Dean's Council for Harvard Divinity School, the Advisory Council for the Center for the Study of Values in Public Life at Harvard Divinity School, and the Board of Fellows for Harvard's School of Dental Medicine.

He has authored several books, including The Soul of a Business: Managing for Profit and the Common Good and Managing Upside Down: Seven Intentions for Values-Centered Leadership.

In 2006, a controlling 84% stake in Tom's of Maine was purchased by Colgate-Palmolive for $100 million.

In 2009, he and his wife received honorary degrees from Colby College.

In 2010, Chappell and his wife founded Ramblers Way, a wool apparel company. The clothing is made from American Rambouillet wool, silk thread, and vegetable dyes, and spinning, weaving, and knitting is done in East coast states to keep the sourcing local and sustainable. The silk thread used is a reminder of the Cheney silk mills. Kate is a descendant of the Cheney family.
