= West Kennebunk, Maine =

- Census-designated place
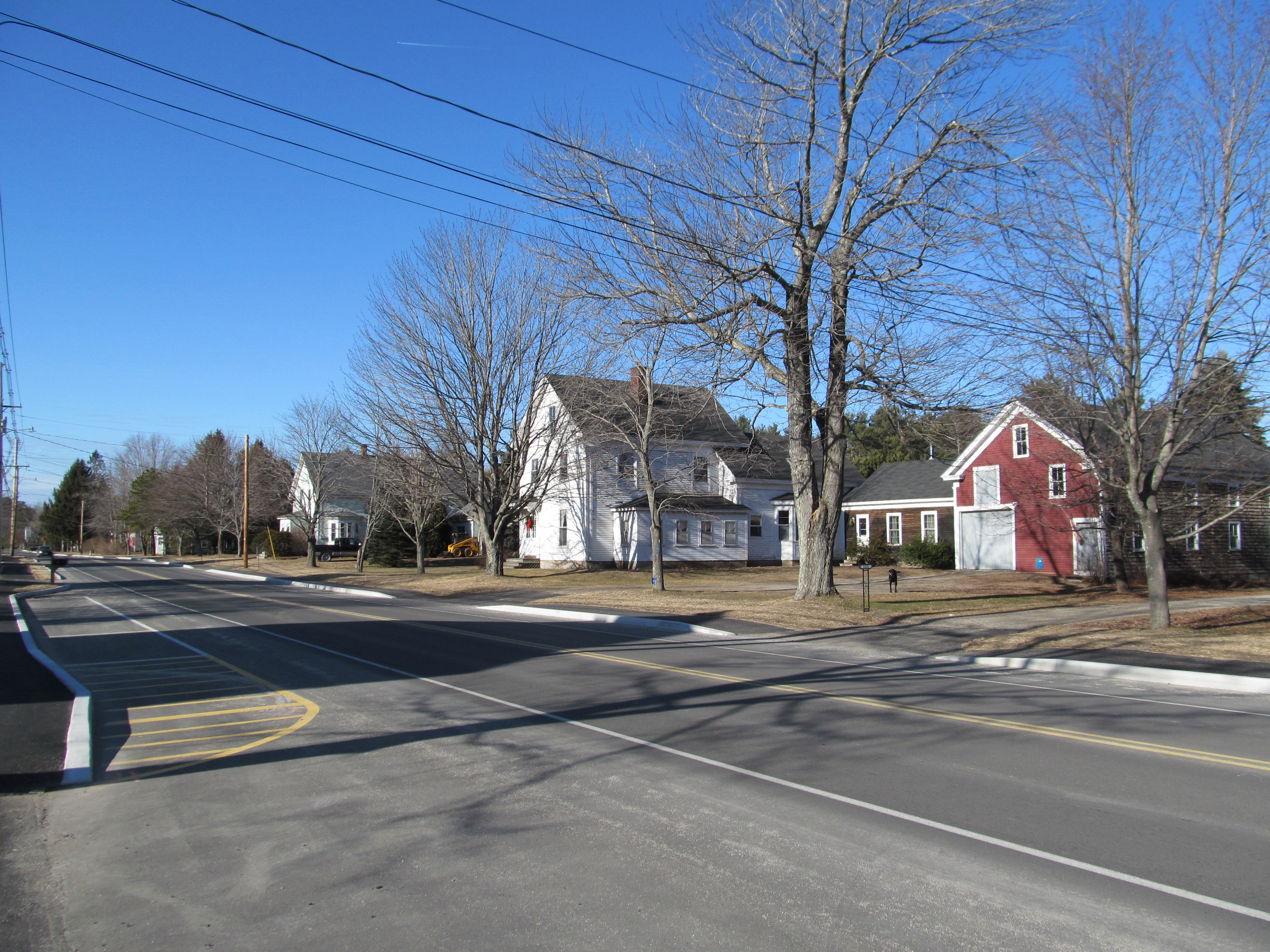
- Alfred Road

- Location within the state of Maine
- Coordinates: 43°24′51″N 70°34′52″W
- Country: United States
- State: Maine
- County: York

Area
  - Total: 3.48 sq mi (9.01 km^{2})
  - Land: 3.48 sq mi (9.01 km^{2})
  - Water: 0 sq mi (0.00 km^{2})
- Elevation: 138 ft (42 m)

Population (2020)
  - Total: 1,191
  - Density: 342.3/sq mi (132.18/km^{2})
- Time zone: UTC-5 (Eastern (EST))
  - Summer (DST): UTC-4 (EDT)
- ZIP code: 04094
- Area code: 207
- FIPS code: 23-83330
- GNIS feature ID: 2377966

West Kennebunk is a census-designated place (CDP) in the town of Kennebunk in York County, Maine, United States. As of the 2020 census, West Kennebunk had a population of 1,191. It is part of the Portland–South Portland–Biddeford, Maine Metropolitan Statistical Area.

== Geography ==
According to the United States Census Bureau, the CDP has a total area of 3.5 square miles (9.1 km^{2}), all land.

== Demographics ==
Historical population
Census	Pop.	Note	%±
2020	1,191		—
U.S. Decennial Census

As of the 2000 Census, there were 809 people, 316 households, and 223 families residing in the CDP. The population density was 233.1 inhabitants per square mile (90.0/km^{2}). There were 332 housing units at an average density of 95.7 per square mile (36.9/km^{2}). The racial makeup of the CDP was 97.90% White, 0.12% African American, 0.25% Native American, 0.87% Asian, 0.12% Pacific Islander, and 0.74% from two or more races. Hispanic or Latino of any race were 1.24% of the population.

There were 316 households, out of which 37.3% had children under the age of 18 living with them, 57.9% were married couples living together, 7.3% had a female householder with no husband present, and 29.4% were non-families. 22.5% of all households were made up of individuals, and 9.5% had someone living alone who was 65 years of age or older. The average household size was 2.55 and the average family size was 2.99.

In the CDP, the population was spread out, with 27.6% under the age of 18, 3.3% from 18 to 24, 37.1% from 25 to 44, 19.9% from 45 to 64, and 12.1% who were 65 years of age or older. The median age was 37 years. For every 100 females, there were 93.1 males. For every 100 females age 18 and over, there were 91.5 males.

The median income for a household in the CDP was $42,125, and the median income for a family was $47,333. Males had a median income of $30,972 versus $25,625 for females. The per capita income for the CDP was $17,922. About 2.3% of families and 5.5% of the population were below the poverty line, including 8.1% of those under age 18 and none of those age 65 or over.

== Education ==
It is in the Regional School Unit 21.
