= Lame–Smith House =

Historic house in Oregon, United States

- James Alexander Smith and Elmarion Smith Barn and Lame–Smith House
- U.S. National Register of Historic Places
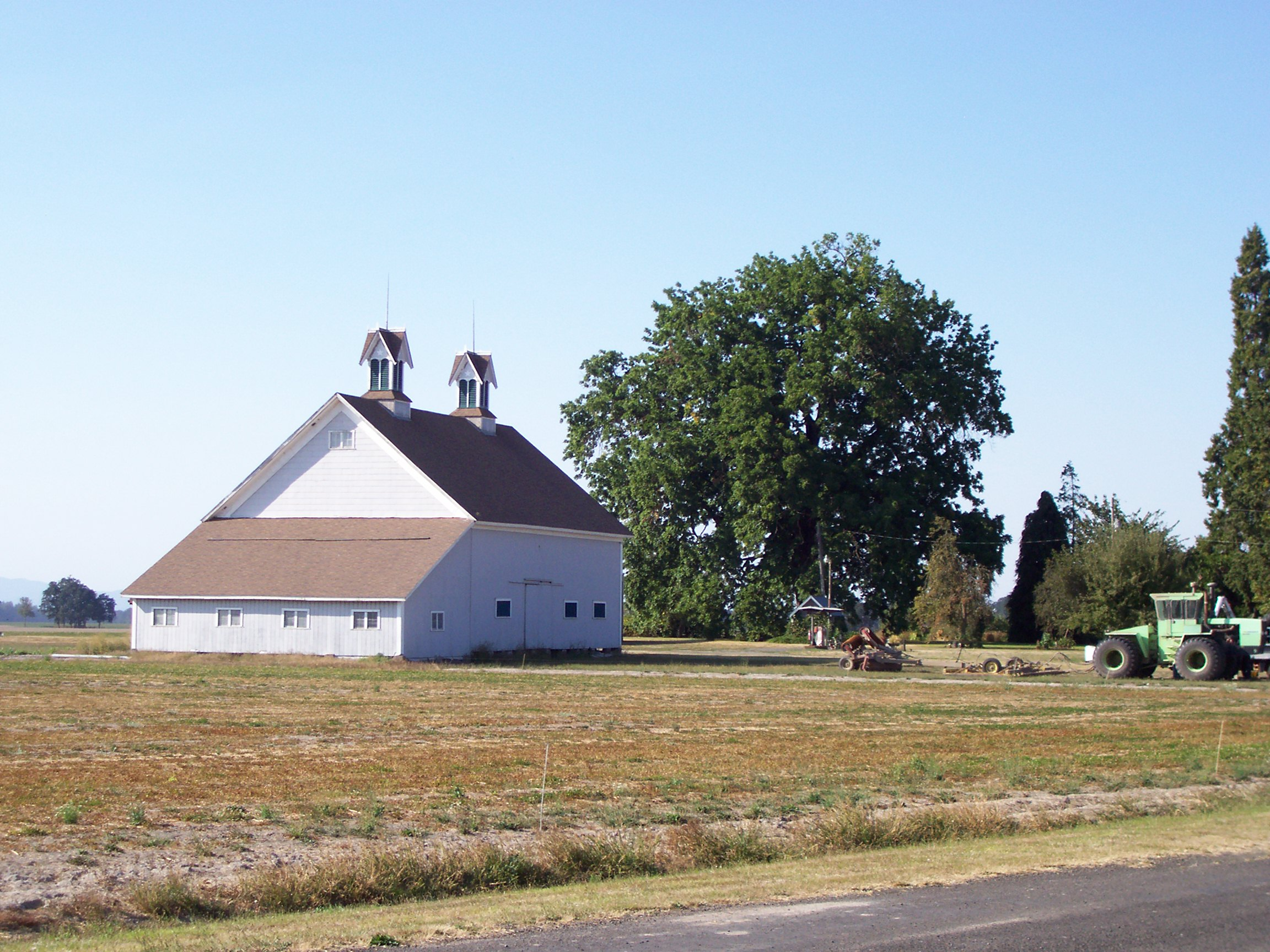
- Sydney and Gertrude Smith Barn

- Location within Oregon Location within the United States
- Nearest city: Halsey, Oregon
- Coordinates: 44°24′18″N 123°7′6″W
- Area: 3.9 acres (1.6 ha)
- Built: 1864
- Architectural style: Gothic Revival; late 19th century barn
- MPS: Barns of Linn County, Oregon MPS
- NRHP reference No.: 99000783
- Added to NRHP: July 15, 1999

The Lame–Smith House and the Sydney and Gertrude Smith Barn (also known as James Alexander Smith and Elmarion Smith Barn), about one mile northwest of Halsey, Oregon, are historic structures that were listed on the National Register of Historic Places in 1999.

The barn is a 40 feet (12 m) by 60 feet (18 m) timber-frame building built in 1888. It was built to house horses being raised for fire and police departments of the Pacific Northwest. Its ornamented cupolas were assessed to be the finest in Linn County.

The farmhouse has Gothic Revival features and was built in c.1864 by Joseph Lame and was enlarged in c.1884 for the J.A. Smith family. This property is mainly constructed of timber. Also on the property are an automobile garage (1994), a wood-frame pump house (1940s), and metal equipment shed (1960s). To the west of the house, in 1998, was a very large Black walnut tree, likely the largest in Linn County.

In 1998 the nearby fields were being used to grow grass seed.
