= Organic wool =

== Defining organic wool ==
Organic wool yarn is wool that is from sheep that have not been exposed to chemicals like pesticides. The Organic Wool Factsheet of the Organic Trade Association (OTA) gives a detailed description of what does and does not constitute organic wool.

"The O'Mama Report" of the OTA identifies "land management, livestock management, scouring processes, spinning processes and dyeing processes" as key factors that determine whether a wool yarn or product can be certified as organic.
