= Tom's of Maine =

American manufacturer of personal care products

- Tom's of Maine logo (2010–)
- Industry: Personal care products
- Founded: 1970; 56 years ago
- Founders: Tom and Kate Chappell
- Headquarters: Kennebunk, Maine, U.S.
- Key people: Esilda Seng (General Manager, 2019–present)
- Products: Non-toxic/natural emphasis
- Parent: Colgate-Palmolive
- Website: www.tomsofmaine.com

Tom's of Maine is a U.S. manufacturer of natural personal care products. Tom's of Maine has been a majority-owned subsidiary of Colgate-Palmolive since 2006. The company was founded in 1970 by Tom Chappell and Kate Chappell (née Cheney) in Maine, United States.

== History ==
Tom's of Maine was founded by Tom and Kate Chappell in 1970 with a $5,000 loan, eventually growing into a $100 million business. The company is based in Kennebunk, Maine, and is a subsidiary of the multinational conglomerate Colgate-Palmolive, as of 2006. Tom's of Maine has approximately 120 employees. The company also employs factories elsewhere in the US and Canada via contract to produce some of their products.

The company's products are sourced and derived from nature, with formulas that are free of artificial flavors, fragrances, colors, sweeteners, and preservatives. The products are not tested on animals, and the company claims that its ingredient processing is supportive of human and environmental health. While most of the company's products are vegan, some products contain propolis and/or beeswax sourced from bees. In March 2019, Tom's of Maine became a Certified B Corporation. The company states that it donates 10% of its annual profits to charitable organizations supporting health, education, and the environment.

In November 2024, the US FDA issued a warning to the company after it "found disease-causing bacteria and mold-like and powdery substances in [Tom's] products and facilities." At least three species of harmful bacteria were found. The FDA also stated that Tom's had received hundreds of consumer complaints, but had not investigated them. The warning letter mandates that Tom's must submit multiple documents, including "assessments and remediation plans for its operations, contamination hazards, testing methods, [and] cleaning procedures."

== Acquisition ==
In 2006, a controlling 84% stake in Tom's of Maine was purchased by Colgate-Palmolive for $100 million; the Chappells own the remaining sixteen percent. The acquisition was significant in getting more consumers to try Tom's of Maine products.

The terms of the purchase stipulate that the policies and company culture of the Tom's of Maine brand will be retained.
