= Kennebunk, Maine =

- Town
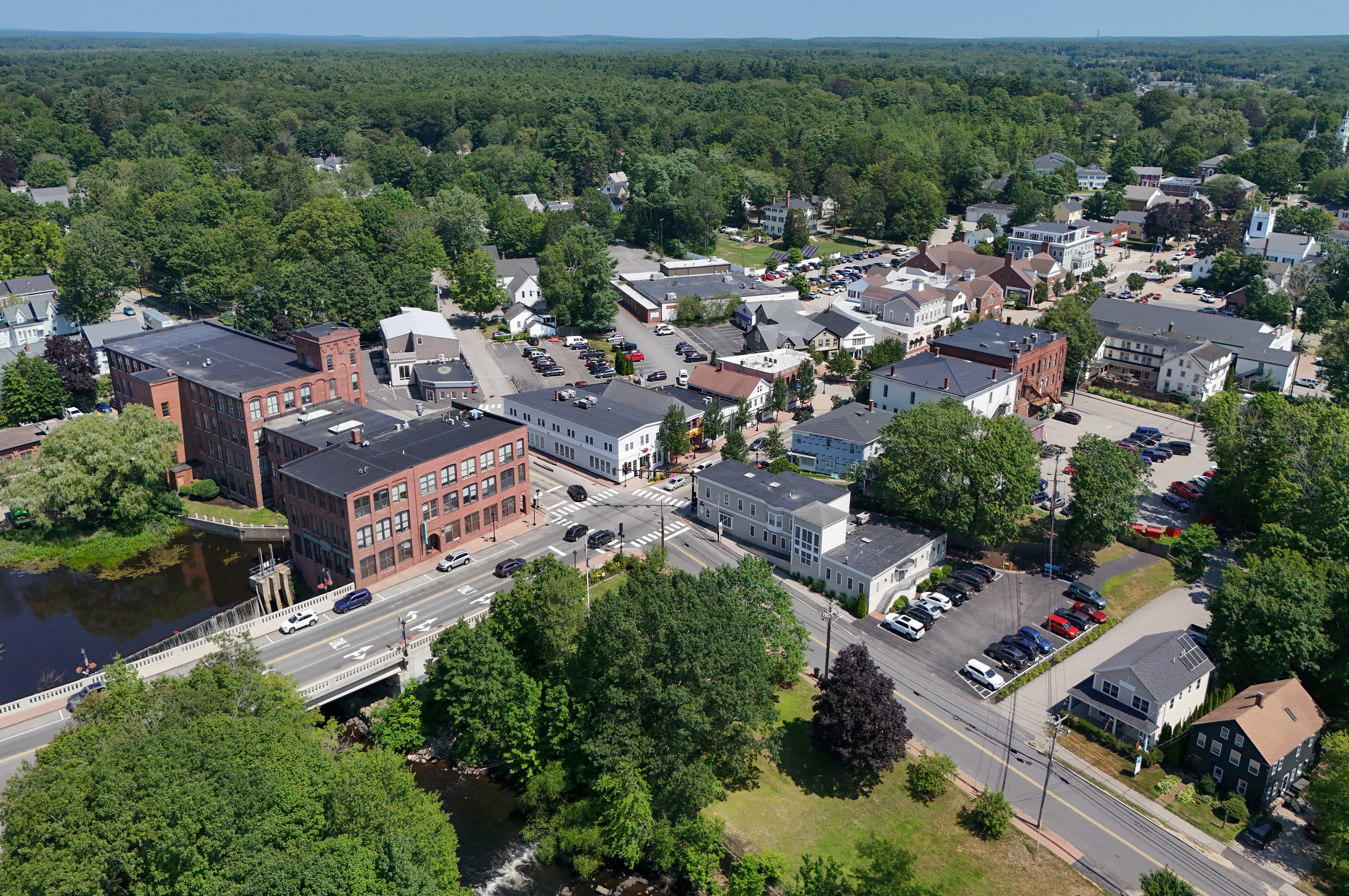
- Downtown

- Seal
- Nickname: "The Only Town in the World, So Named & Famed"
- Motto: "The only village in the world so named"
- Location within Maine Location within the United States
- Coordinates: 43°23′8″N 70°32′49″W
- Country: United States
- State: Maine
- County: York
- Incorporated: June 24, 1820
- Boroughs: List: Constituent communities and villages: • Kennebunk Village • Kennebunk Landing • Lower Village • West Kennebunk • Bartlett Mills • Kennebunk Beach / Goochs Beach • Lords Point • Sea Road Crossing • Webhannet Grove • Coopers Crossing • Cheshire Meadows • Brine Pines

Government
  - Type: Town Meeting

Area
  - Total: 43.87 sq mi (113.62 km^{2})
  - Land: 35.05 sq mi (90.78 km^{2})
  - Water: 8.82 sq mi (22.84 km^{2})
- Elevation: 66 ft (20 m)

Population (2020)
  - Total: 11,536
  - Density: 329/sq mi (127.1/km^{2})
- Time zone: UTC-5 (Eastern (EST))
  - Summer (DST): UTC-4 (EDT)
- ZIP Codes: 04043 (Kennebunk); 04094 (West Kennebunk)
- Area code: 207
- FIPS code: 23-36535
- GNIS feature ID: 582539
- Website: www.kennebunkmaine.us

Kennebunk /ˈkɛniˌbʌŋk/ is a town in York County, Maine, United States. The population was 11,536 at the 2020 census. Kennebunk is home to several beaches, the Rachel Carson National Wildlife Refuge, the 1799 Kennebunk Inn, many historic shipbuilders' homes, the Brick Store Museum and the Nature Conservancy Kennebunk Plains (known locally as the Blueberry Plains), with 1,500 acres (6 km^{2}) of nature trails and blueberry fields.

The municipality includes the constituent villages of Kennebunk Village (Town), the Lower Village (Lower Kennebunk), Kennebunk Landing (the Landing), Bartlett Mills, West Kennebunk, Kennebunk Beach, Lords Point, Coopers Corner Crossing, Sea Roads Crossing, Webahennet Grove, and Vinegarhill, Cheshire Commons, Kennebunk Meadows, and various newer neighborhoods. It does not include Kennebunkport, which is a separate town.

== History ==
First settled in 1621, the town developed as a trading and, later, shipbuilding until 1918, and shipping center with light manufacturing. It was part of the town of Wells and Arundel until 1820, when it incorporated as a separate town. "Kennebunk, the only village in the world so named," was featured on a large locally famous sign attached to the Kesslen Shoe Mill on Route One. To the Abenaki peoples, Kennebunk means "the long cut bank," presumably the long bank behind Kennebunk Beach.

In the 19th century and early 20th century, many industrial concerns were attracted to Mousam River at Kennebunk to provide motive force for their mills. Among the firms to do business there were the Kennebunk Manufacturing Company, the Mousam Manufacturing Company, the Leatheroid Company and the Rogers Fibre Company.

The Lafayette Elm was a tree which was planted to commemorate General Lafayette's 1825 visit to Kennebunk. It became famous for its age, size, and survival of the Dutch elm disease that destroyed the hundreds of the other elms that once lined Kennebunk's streets. The elm is featured on the town seal.

The restored Kesslen Shoe Mill has been renamed the Lafayette Center. Kennebunk is home to two of the state's oldest banks—Ocean Bank (1854) and Kennebunk Savings Bank (1871). Only Saco & Biddeford Savings Institution (1827) and Bangor Savings Bank (1852) are older.

The town's archives are located at the local history and art center, the Brick Store Museum, on Main Street.

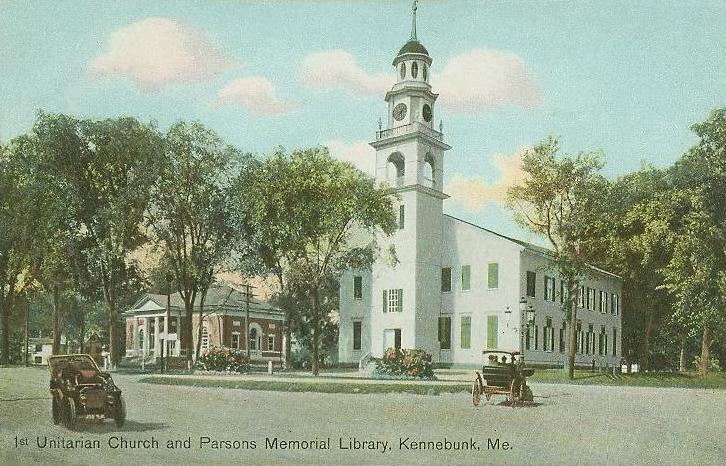
First Parish Church in 1909

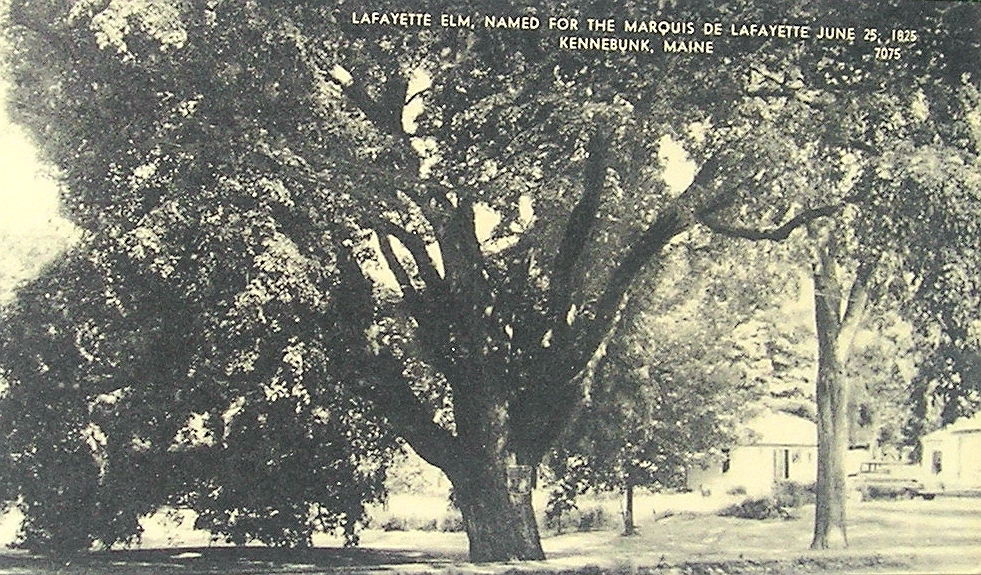
The Lafayette Elm

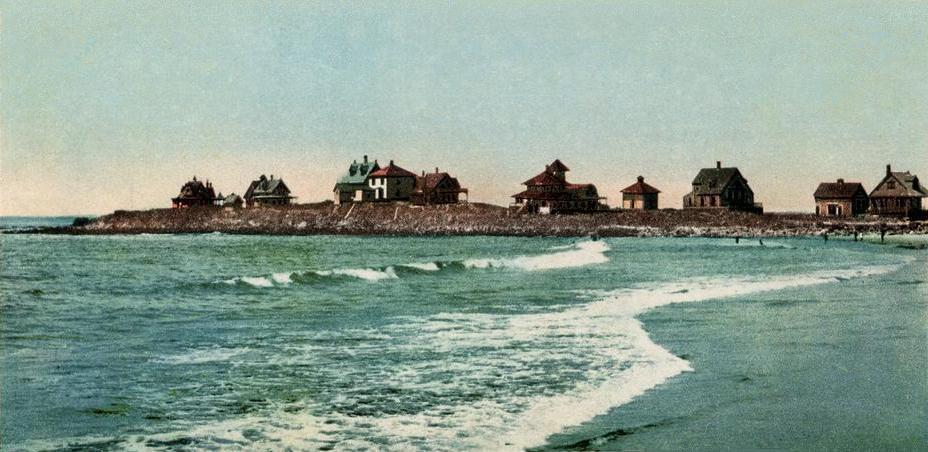
Kennebunk Beach in 1905

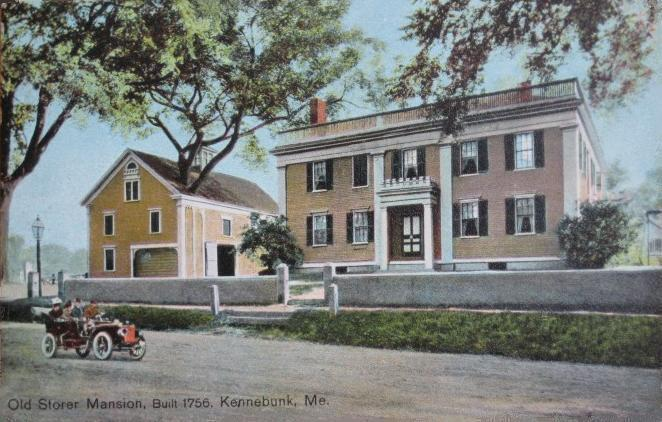
Storer Mansion in 1909

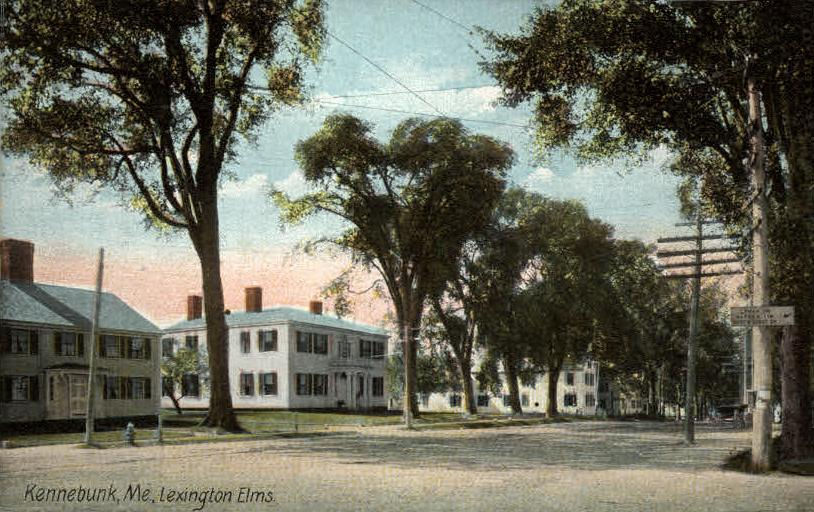
Lexington elms in 1908

== Geography ==
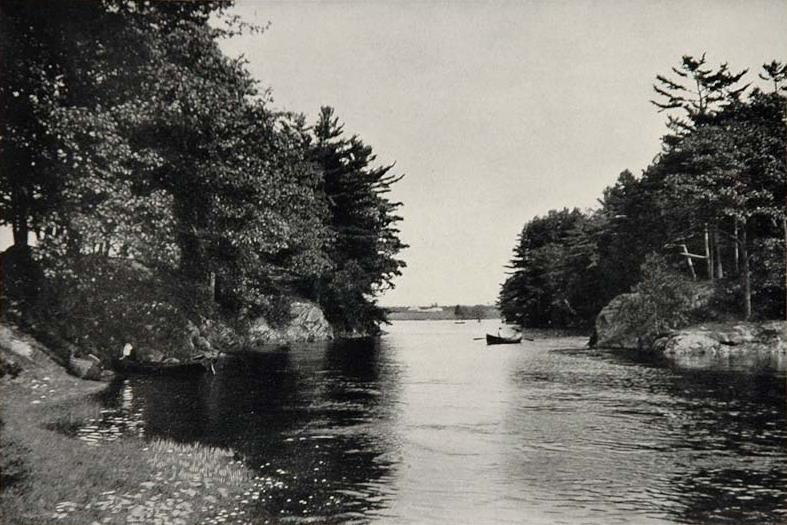
Kennebunk River in 1903

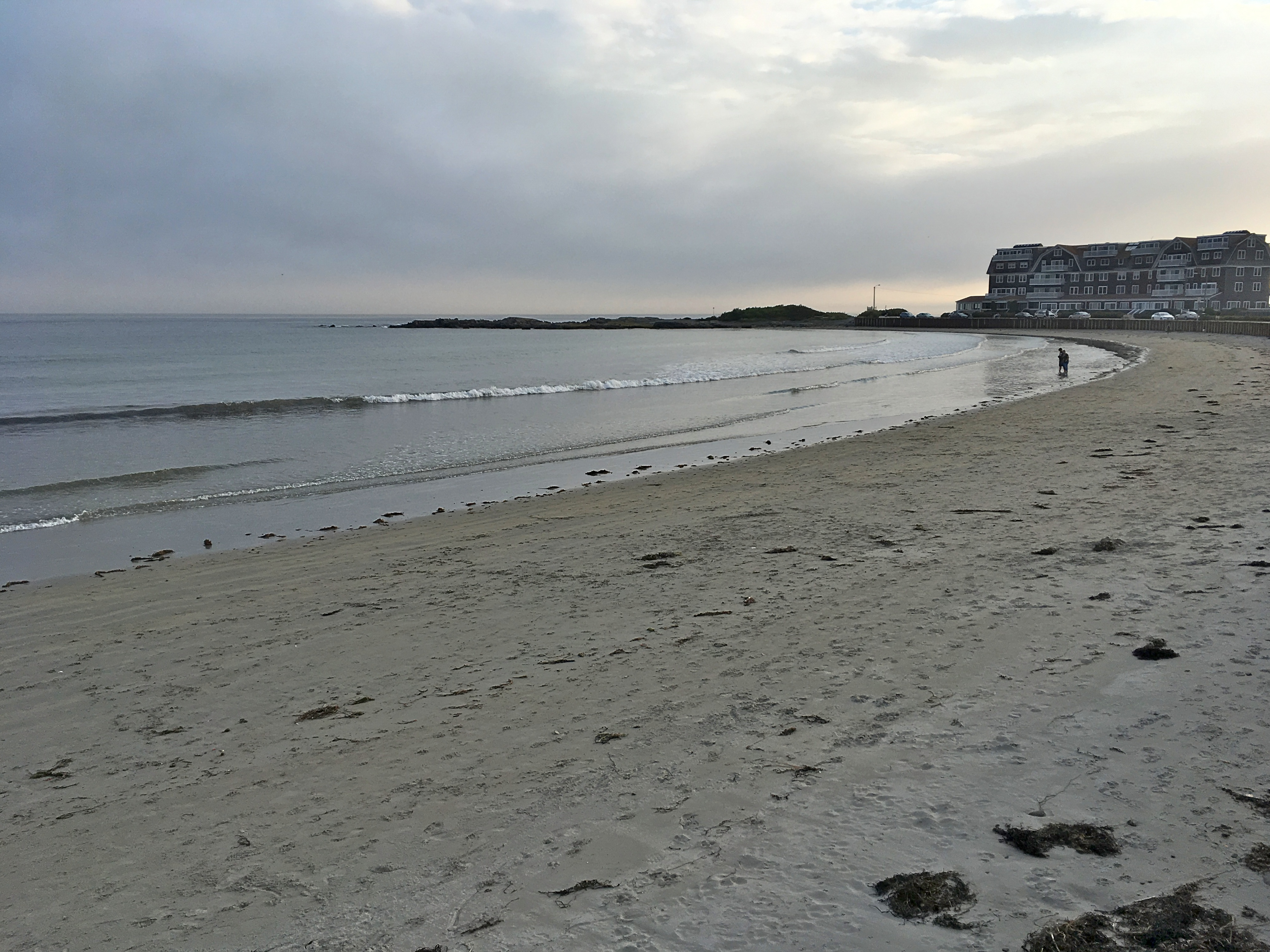
Gooch's Beach in 2017

According to the United States Census Bureau, the town has a total area of 43.87 square miles (113.62 km^{2}), of which 35.05 square miles (90.78 km^{2}) is land and 8.82 square miles (22.84 km^{2}) is water. Kennebunk is drained by the Kennebunk River and Mousam River.

=== Transportation ===
- Interstate 95
- U.S. 1 which goes through the center of Kennebunk and is part of the main street.
- Route 9A
- Route 35

Amtrak passenger rail also goes through Kennebunk, but does not stop at the historic train station there. Passenger rail service at Kennebunk station ceased in 1965. The closest Amtrak stops along the Downeaster are at Wells station, south towards Boston, or Saco station, north towards Portland.

=== Adjacent municipalities ===
- Arundel (north)
- Kennebunkport (north)
- Wells (south)
- Sanford (west)
- Alfred (west)
- Lyman (northwest)

=== Beaches ===
Kennebunk's coastline is divided into three major sections: Mother's Beach; Middle Beach or Rocky Beach; and Gooch's Beach or Long Beach. Separate from Kennebunk Beach is secluded Parson's Beach, a quiet alternative to the summer crowds.

There is some local controversy regarding the "Mother's Beach" nickname. According to many local residents, the smaller of the three main beaches—at the intersection of Beach Avenue and Ridge Avenue—is officially Kennebunk Beach or, alternatively, Boothby Beach. The term Boothby Beach was from the mid-1730s when a Mabel Littlefield married Richard Boothby and settled on land near what came to be known as Boothby Beach. The information about the Boothbys was taken from the "Old News From Southern Maine" article on Mable and Richard Boothby, by Sharon Cummins. Many natives today may not remember it being called Boothby Beach, and over the years it came to be known as Kennebunk Beach or Mothers Beach. Older residents also recall the name Dipsy Bath Beach, a reference to the baths once located there. The term Mother's Beach didn't come into widespread use until the mid-1980s; however, other native residents dispute that date and say they remember it being called "Mothers Beach" as far back as the late 1950s. The name likely evolved due to its small size and generally calmer water, due to the rocks under and above the ocean, thus making it a natural harbor of refuge that is safer for swimming and which makes it popular with mothers keeping a watchful eye on their children. The name is clearly descriptive rather than official, in spite of the recent installation of road signs pointing the way to "Mother's Beach". Contradicting the above beach naming is the town's website, which states, "Permits are valid for Gooch’s Beach, Kennebunk Beach (Middle Beach) and Mother’s Beach."

Additionally, without public parking access, both Libbys and Crescent beaches are in Kennebunk between Parson's Beach and Mother's Beach.

== Demographics ==
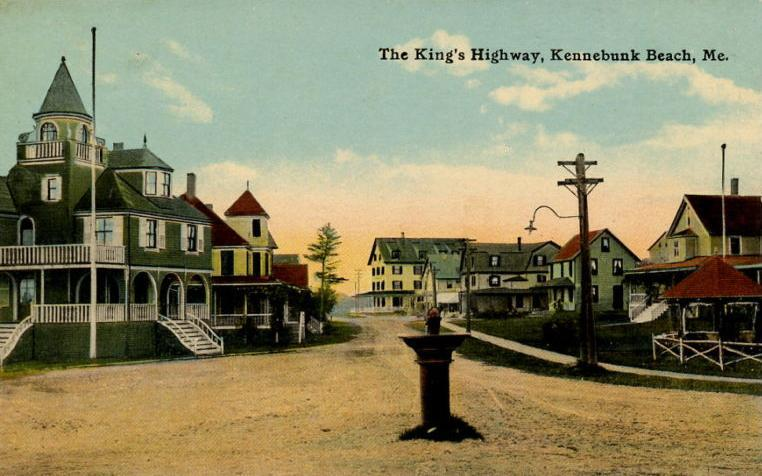
The King's Highway c. 1912, Kennebunk Beach

Historical population
Census	Pop.	Note	%±
1820	2,145		—
1830	2,233		4.1%
1840	2,323		4.0%
1850	2,650		14.1%
1860	2,679		1.1%
1870	2,603		−2.8%
1880	2,852		9.6%
1890	3,172		11.2%
1900	3,228		1.8%
1910	3,099		−4.0%
1920	3,138		1.3%
1930	3,302		5.2%
1940	3,698		12.0%
1950	4,273		15.5%
1960	4,551		6.5%
1970	5,646		24.1%
1980	6,621		17.3%
1990	8,004		20.9%
2000	10,476		30.9%
2010	10,798		3.1%
2020	11,536		6.8%

=== 2010 census ===
As of the census of 2010, there were 10,798 people, 4,689 households, and 2,966 families living in the town. The population density was 308.1 inhabitants per square mile (119.0/km^{2}). There were 5,906 housing units at an average density of 168.5 units per square mile (65.1 units/km^{2}). The racial makeup of the town was 96.9% White, 0.00% African American, 0.2% Native American, 1.0% Asian, 0.3% from other races, and 1.1% from two or more races. Hispanic or Latino people of any race were 1.0% of the population.

There were 4,689 households, of which 26.9% had children under the age of 18 living with them, 52.1% were married couples living together, 8.5% had a female householder with no husband present, 2.7% had a male householder with no wife present, and 36.7% were non-families. 31.1% of all households were made up of individuals, and 16.5% had someone living alone who was 65 years of age or older. The average household size was 2.27 and the average family size was 2.85.

The median age in the town was 48.2 years. 20.8% of residents were under the age of 18; 5.2% were between the ages of 18 and 24; 18.7% were from 25 to 44; 33.4% were from 45 to 64, and 21.9% were 65 years of age or older. The gender makeup of the town was 46.5% male and 53.5% female.

=== 2000 census ===
At the 2000 census, there were 10,476 people, 4,229 households and 2,901 families living in the town. The population density was 298.5 inhabitants per square mile (115.3/km^{2}). There were 4,985 housing units at an average density of 142.1 units per square mile (54.9 units/km^{2}). The racial makeup of the town was 98.04% White, 0.18% Black or African American, 0.11% Native American, 0.85% Asian, 0.01% Pacific Islander, 0.18% from other races, and 0.62% from two or more races. Hispanic or Latino people of any race were 0.51% of the population.

There were 4,229 households, of which 33.2% had children under the age of 18 living with them, 56.9% were married couples living together, 9.1% had a female householder with no husband present, and 31.4% were non-families. 26.7% of all households were made up of individuals, and 13.8% had someone living alone who was 65 years of age or older. The average household size was 2.44 and the average family size was 2.97.

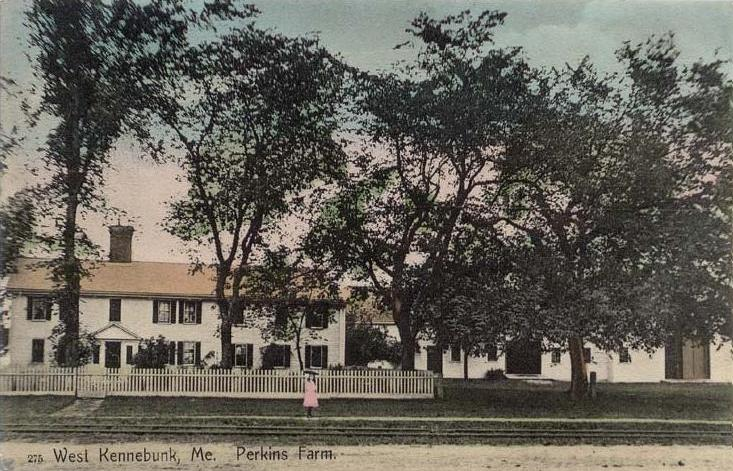
View of the Perkins Farm c. 1910

Age distribution was 25.6% under the age of 18, 4.2% from 18 to 24, 27.3% from 25 to 44, 25.8% from 45 to 64, and 17.2% who were 65 years of age or older. The median age was 41 years. For every 100 females, there were 87.2 males. For every 100 females age 18 and over, there were 82.1 males.

The median household income was $50,914, and the median family income was $59,712. Males had a median income of $42,417 versus $25,788 for females. The per capita income for the town was $26,181. About 2.9% of families and 4.2% of the population were below the poverty line, including 3.3% of those under age 18 and 3.5% of those aged 65 or over.

== Economy ==
The headquarters for the natural health-care product manufacturer Tom's of Maine is located in Kennebunk. Many residents commute to Portland, or out-of-state to New Hampshire, or Massachusetts.

=== Tourism ===
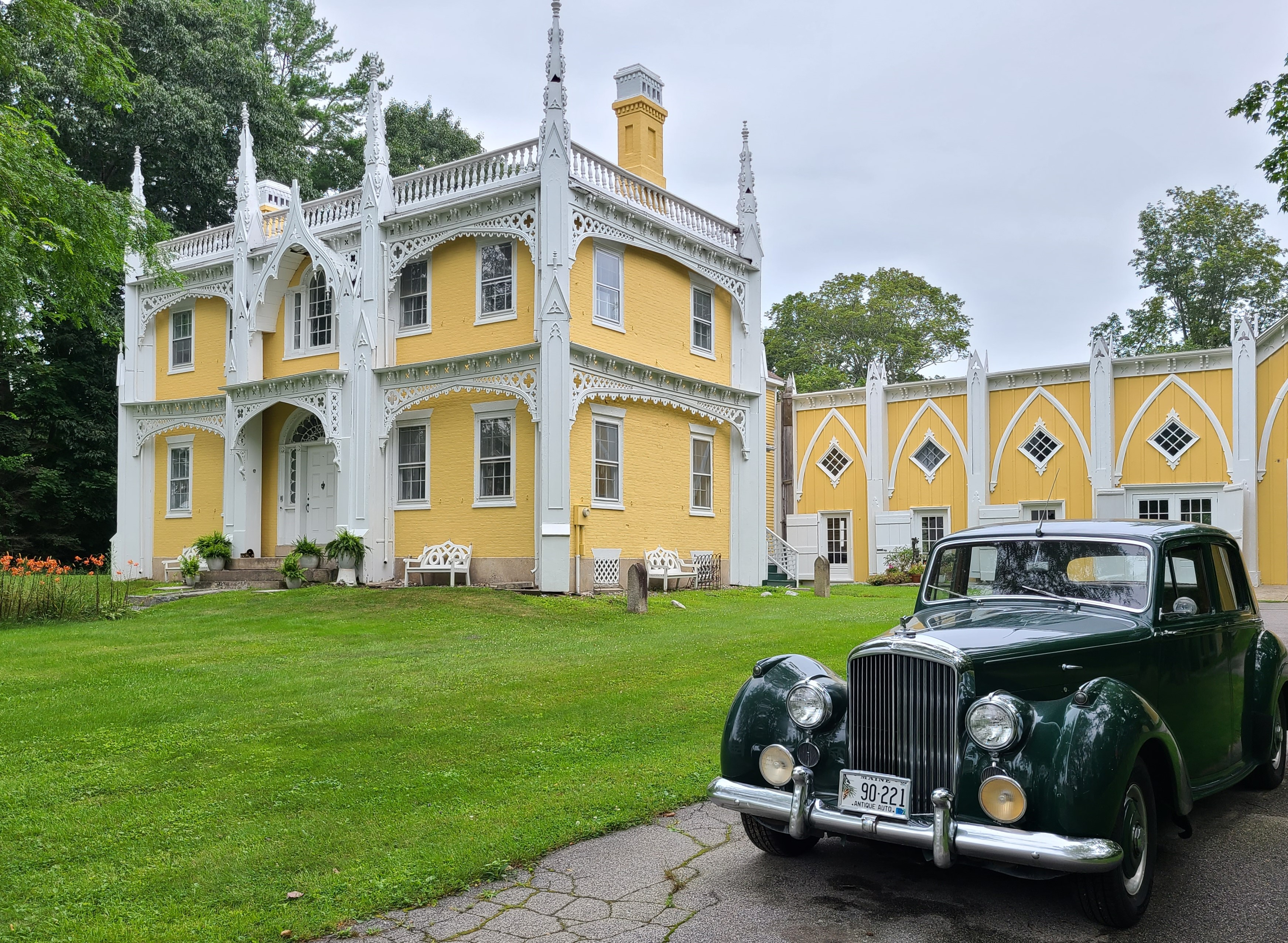
Wedding Cake House in Kennebunk

The town is a popular summer tourist destination, which drives the local economy. Summer Street was Maine's first Historic District that was listed on the National Register of Historic Places. The Lower Alewive Historic District was listed on the National Register of Historic Places in 1994.

Kennebunk contains fine examples of early architecture, the most noted of which is the Wedding Cake House, a Federal-style dwelling extensively decorated with scroll saw Gothic trim. This was added to the house for his wife of many years by George Washington Bourne late in his life, and not as legend has it by a ship captain for a young bride lost at sea.

In 2025 , the Wedding Cake House was sold and "Pieces" or parts of the cake were auction offed. Including an original oil painting of George Washington

==== Site of interest ====
- Brick Store Museum
- Wedding Cake House
- Rachel Carson National Wildlife Refuge
- Kennebunk River Club
- Lower Alewive Historic District
- White Barn Inn

== Education ==
Kennebunk, along with neighboring Kennebunkport and Arundel towns, form Regional School District 21. The schools in RSU 21 are Consolidated School, Kennebunk Elementary School, Mildred L. Day School, Sea Road School, Middle School of the Kennebunks, and Kennebunk High School. The Middle School of the Kennebunks is part of Maine's project that gives laptops to all of the 6th, 7th and 8th graders in the school called MLTI, or Maine Learning Technology Initiative.

In 2000, a group of students teamed up with parents and local community members to found The New School, a small alternative high school, with students coming from as close as Kennebunk and Wells and as far away as Portland and Somersworth. The school is accredited by the State of Maine and the first group of students graduated in June 2001. The New School has a focus on community-based learning.

== Notable people ==
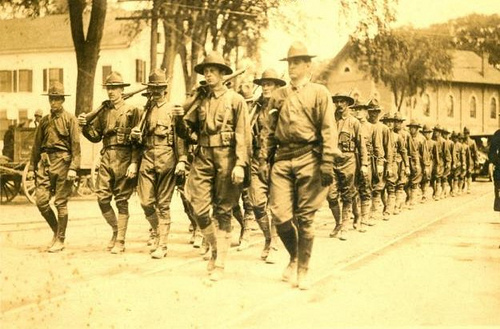
Troops marching through town c. 1918

- Edward H. Betts, painter and art educator
- Kate Chappell, businesswoman
- Tom Chappell, businessman
- Eunice Hale Waite Cobb, writer, public speaker, activist
- Jack Coombs, baseball player who grew up in Kennebunk
- Joseph Dane, US congressman
- Turney Duff, author and businessperson
- Judith Hunt, illustrator
- Theodore Lyman I, merchant and shipbuilder
- Hugh McCulloch, secretary of the U.S. Treasury
- Brooke McEldowney, cartoonist
- Bruce McMillan, children's book author and watercolor artist
- Thomas W. Murphy Jr., eight-term State Representative
- Edmund S. Muskie, U.S. Senator and U.S. Secretary of State
- Erik Nedeau, runner
- Jeff Olson, musician
- Pinkerton Thugs, musicians
- Kenneth Roberts, author
- Daniel Sayre, politician
- Clement Storer, US congressman and senator
- Mary Alice Willcox, zoologist
