= National Register of Historic Places listings in Calhoun County, Iowa =

Location of Calhoun County in Iowa

This is a list of the National Register of Historic Places listings in Calhoun County, Iowa.

This is intended to be a complete list of the properties and districts on the National Register of Historic Places in Calhoun County, Iowa, United States. Latitude and longitude coordinates are provided for many National Register properties and districts; these locations may be seen together in a map.

There are 13 properties listed on the National Register in the county.

This National Park Service list is complete through NPS recent listings posted December 12, 2025.

	Name on the Register	Image	Date listed	Location	City or town	Description
1	Calhoun County Courthouse	Calhoun County Courthouse	July 2, 1981 (#81000227)	Court and 4th Sts. 42°23′41″N 94°38′07″W	Rockwell City	
2	Central School	Central School	January 3, 1985 (#85000001)	201 S. Center; 42°15′57″N 94°44′02″W	Lake City	
3	Chicago and North Western Office Building/Passenger Depot-Lake City	Chicago and North Western Office Building/Passenger Depot-Lake City	August 27, 1990 (#90001205)	401 Front St. 42°15′54″N 94°43′46″W	Lake City	
4	Perry C. and Mattie Forrest Holdoegel House	Perry C. and Mattie Forrest Holdoegel House	May 6, 1992 (#91001831)	504 8th St. 42°23′39″N 94°38′16″W	Rockwell City	
5	First National Bank of Pomeroy		June 20, 2023 (#100009076)	101 South Main St. 42°33′04″N 94°41′06″W	Pomeroy	
6	Lake City Community Memorial Building	Lake City Community Memorial Building	August 27, 1990 (#90001210)	118 E. Washington St. 42°16′06″N 94°43′59″W	Lake City	
7	Lake City Public Library	Lake City Public Library	August 27, 1990 (#90001209)	120 N. Illinois St. 42°16′06″N 94°43′55″W	Lake City	The former Carnegie library building.
8	Lake City Water Standpipe	Lake City Water Standpipe	August 27, 1990 (#90001211)	100 block of W. Washington St. 42°16′08″N 94°44′03″W	Lake City	
9	Marsh Rainbow Arch Bridge	Marsh Rainbow Arch Bridge	March 30, 1989 (#88002529)	Highway N37 over the North Raccoon River; 42°13′46″N 94°46′03″W	Lake City	
10	Rockwell City Bridge		June 25, 1998 (#98000752)	270th St. over an unnamed stream 42°23′57″N 94°36′25″W	Rockwell City	
11	Smith Farmhouse	Smith Farmhouse	August 27, 1990 (#90001206)	Junction of Rainbow Rd., S. and Monroe St. 42°15′55″N 94°44′46″W	Lake City	
12	Gen. Cass and Belle Smith House	Gen. Cass and Belle Smith House	August 27, 1990 (#90001207)	500 W. Main St. 42°16′03″N 94°44′19″W	Lake City	
13	Peter and Mary Smith House	Peter and Mary Smith House	August 27, 1990 (#90001208)	304 W. Main St. 42°16′04″N 94°44′11″W	Lake City	

== Former listings ==
Two properties were once listed on the Register but have since been removed:

	Name on the Register	Image	Date listed	Date removed	Location	City or town	Description
1	Dr. Charles Knapp Round Barn		December 23, 1986 (#86003187)	August 26, 2005	Off CR D26; 42°29′15″N 94°38′15″W	Jolley	Delisted due to relocation. Still standing at new location.
2	Welsh Bridge		June 25, 1998 (#98000751)	December 15, 2003	1st Ave. over Welsh's Slough	Somers	Replaced in 2003

== See also ==
- List of National Historic Landmarks in Iowa
- National Register of Historic Places listings in Iowa
- Listings in neighboring counties: Carroll, Greene, Pocahontas, Sac, Webster
