= Smith Farm =

Smith Farm or Smith Farmhouse or variations may refer to:

- Sylvester Smith Farmstead, Boswell, Arkansas, listed on the National Register of Historic Places in Izard County, Arkansas
- Smith Farm (Plainfield, Indiana), listed on the National Register of Historic Places in Hendricks County, Indiana
- Samuel G. Smith Farm, Richmond, Indiana, listed on the National Register of Historic Places in Wayne County, Indiana
- Smith Farmhouse (Lake City, Iowa), listed on the National Register of Historic Places in Calhoun County, Iowa
- Smith–Lyon Farmhouse, Southbridge, Massachusetts, listed on the NRHP in Massachusetts
- Orie J. Smith Black and White Stock Farm Historic District, Kirksville, Missouri, listed on the National Register of Historic Places listings in Adair County, Missouri
- Smith–Mason Farm, Harrisville, New Hampshire, listed on the National Register of Historic Places in Cheshire County, New Hampshire
- Henry Smith Farmstead, Huntington Station, New York, listed on the National Register of Historic Places in Huntington (town), New York
- Henry Tunis Smith Farm, Nassau, New York, listed on the National Register of Historic Places in Rensselaer County, New York
- Smith Family Farm, the boyhood home of Joseph Smith, founder of Mormonism, and site of early historic events in the religion.
- Edward Smith Jr. Farm, Washington Court House, Ohio, listed on the National Register of Historic Places in Fayette County, Ohio
- Henry Smith Farm, Middletown, Pennsylvania, listed on the National Register of Historic Places in Dauphin County, Pennsylvania
- Smith Family Farmstead, New Hope, Pennsylvania, listed on the National Register of Historic Places in Bucks County, Pennsylvania
- Smith–Gardiner–Norman Farm Historic District, Middletown, Rhode Island, listed on the NRHP in Rhode Island
- Jessie Smith Farmstead, Volin, South Dakota, listed on the National Register of Historic Places in Yankton County, South Dakota
- Robert Andrew Smith Farm, Murfreesboro, Tennessee, listed on the National Register of Historic Places in Rutherford County, Tennessee
- Smith Farmhouse (Pasquo, Tennessee), listed on the National Register of Historic Places in Davidson County, Tennessee
- Samuel Gilbert Smith Farmstead, Brattleboro, Vermont, listed on the National Register of Historic Places in Windsor County, Vermont
- Peter Smith Farm–Donation Land Claim, Parkland, Washington, listed on the National Register of Historic Places in Pierce County, Washington
- Watters Smith Farm on Duck Creek, Lost Creek, West Virginia, listed on the NRHP in West Virginia
- Terwilliger–Smith Farm, Kerhonkson, New York, listed on the NRHP in Ulster County, New York
