= Lake City Public Library =

Lake City Public Library may refer to:

- Lake City Public Library (Lake City, Iowa), designed by Edgar Lee Barber, listed on the National Register of Historic Places in Calhoun County, Iowa
- Lake City Public Library, library of Lake City, Minnesota
