= Lake Creek Township, Calhoun County, Iowa =

Township in Iowa, US

Lake Creek Township, Calhoun County
- Township
- Coordinates: 42°20′48″N 094°40′51″W
- Country: United States
- State: Iowa
- County: Calhoun

Area
  - Total: 36.32 sq mi (94.06 km^{2})
  - Land: 36.26 sq mi (93.91 km^{2})
  - Water: 0.058 sq mi (0.15 km^{2})
- Elevation: 1,227 ft (374 m)

Population (2000)
  - Total: 140
  - Density: 3.9/sq mi (1.5/km^{2})
- FIPS code: 19-92370
- GNIS feature ID: 0468187

Lake Creek Township is one of sixteen townships in Calhoun County, Iowa, United States. As of the 2000 census, its population was 140.

== History ==
Lake Creek Township was created in 1876. The township took its name from Lake Creek.

== Geography ==
Lake Creek Township covers an area of 36.32 square miles (94.1 km^{2}) and contains no incorporated settlements. According to the USGS, it contains one cemetery, Lake Creek.
