= Peter and Mary Smith House =

Historic house in Iowa, United States

- U.S. National Register of Historic Places
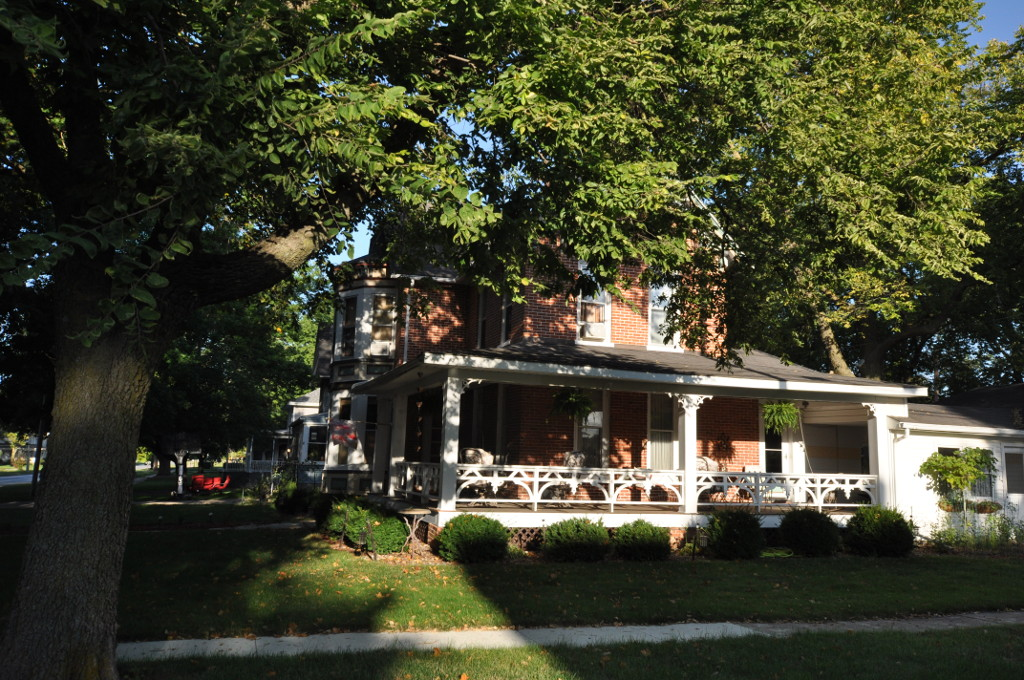

- Location within Iowa Location within the United States
- Location: 304 W. Main St. Lake City, Iowa
- Coordinates: 42°16′03″N 94°44′11″W
- Built: 1887
- Architectural style: Italianate; Gothic Revival
- MPS: Lake City Iowa MPS
- NRHP reference No.: 90001208
- Added to NRHP: August 27, 1990

The Peter and Mary Smith House, also known as the Hopkins House and the Otto House, is a historic dwelling located in Lake City, Iowa, United States. Peter Smith was a pioneer to this town and a prominent businessman. He was involved in retail, banking, and real estate. Smith and his first wife Sarah settled in Calhoun County, Iowa from Cass County, Michigan around 1855, and bought land near the present Smith Farmhouse. He served as the first judge in the county when Lake City was the county seat. Sarah died in 1875 while they were living in Glidden, Iowa. After the arrival of the railroad in 1881, Peter and his second wife Mary moved to Lake City. They built this two-story, brick, L-shaped house in 1887. While it does not conform to any one style, it is primarily a combination of the Italianate and the Gothic Revival styles. The Italianate influence is found in the bracketed cornice, segmentally arched lintels, wooden cutout designs over the windows, a front bay window, and the hipped roof. The influences of the Gothic Revival style are found in the bargeboard and the roof line. The house was listed on the National Register of Historic Places in 1990.
