= Lake City Water Standpipe =

- U.S. National Register of Historic Places
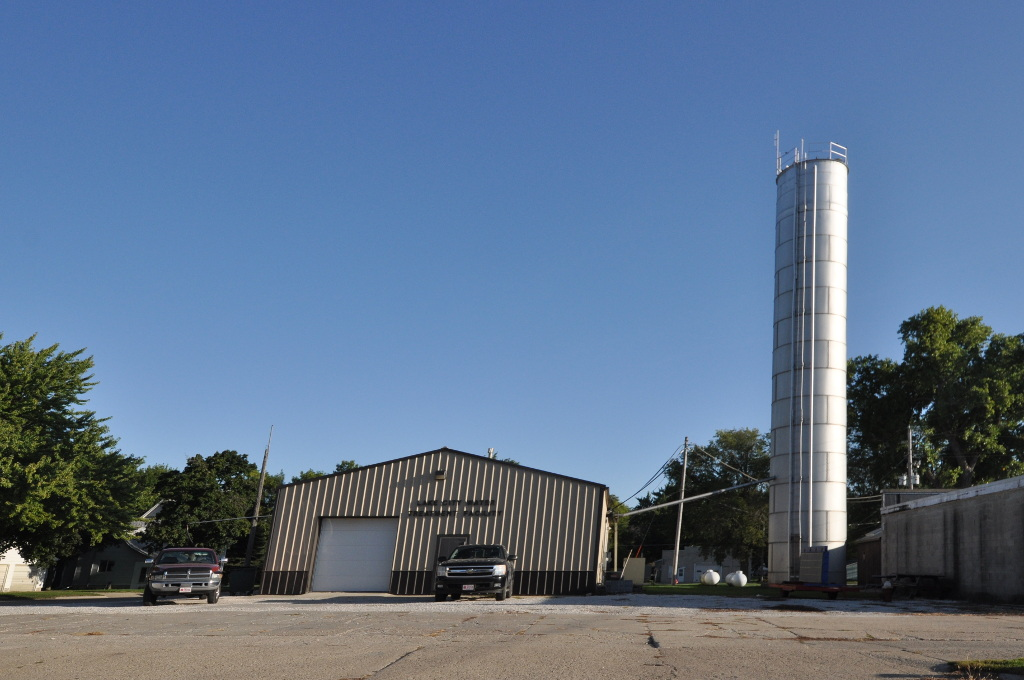

- Location within Iowa Location within the United States
- Location: 100 block of W. Washington St. Lake City, Iowa
- Coordinates: 42°16′07″N 94°44′04″W
- Area: less than one acre
- Built: 1893
- Built by: A.F. Paige Co.
- MPS: Lake City Iowa MPS
- NRHP reference No.: 90001211
- Added to NRHP: August 27, 1990

The Lake City Water Standpipe is a historic structure located in Lake City, Iowa, United States. The standpipe was a popular form of water tower from about 1860 to the turn of the 20th century. The city council first attempted to build it as early as 1890, but the $10,000 bond was rejected. An $8,000 bond issue passed in June 1893, and a Water Works Department was established. The city contracted with the A.F. Paige Company of Sioux City to build the tower, which is 90 feet (27 m) tall and a diameter of 12 feet (4 m). It was completed in November 1893. Water mains were laid the following year and water was delivered to most citizens of Lake City. It also allowed the city to provide adequate fire protection. A new water tank was built next to the standpipe in the 1920s. It has subsequently been replaced by a larger structure on the southeast side of town. The standpipe was listed on the National Register of Historic Places in 1990.
