= Lake City Community Memorial Building =

- Lake City Community; Memorial Building
- U.S. National Register of Historic Places
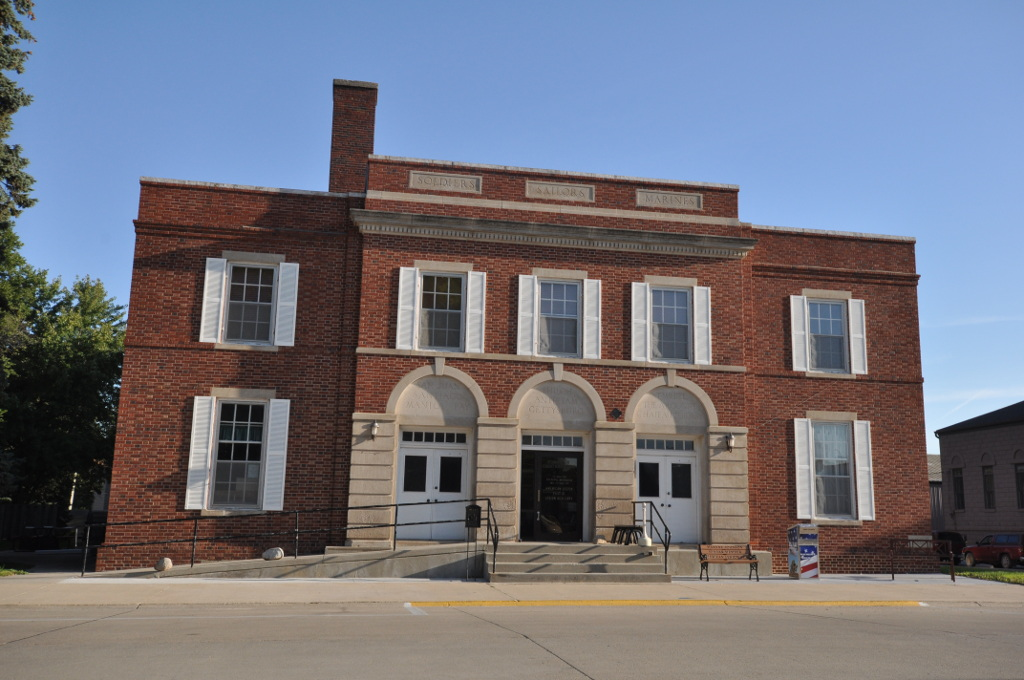

- Location within Iowa Location within the United States
- Location: 118 E. Washington St. Lake City, Iowa
- Coordinates: 42°16′06″N 94°43′58″W
- Area: less than one acre
- Built: 1920
- Built by: Arthur H. Neumann & Co.
- Architect: Proudfoot, Bird & Rawson
- Architectural style: Classical Revival
- MPS: Lake City Iowa MPS; Architectural Legacy of Proudfoot & Bird in Iowa MPS
- NRHP reference No.: 90001210
- Added to NRHP: August 27, 1990

The Lake City Community Memorial Building is a historic structure located in Lake City, Iowa, United States. The building was built as a memorial to those who served in the American Civil War, the Spanish–American War, and World War I. It was a project of the women in the Lake City Civic Improvement Society, a Progressive Era organization that exemplified civic involvement and community cohesion. They provided the funding while the city council was responsible for its development. The two-story, brick Neoclassical structure was designed by the Des Moines architectural firm of Proudfoot, Bird & Rawson, and it was built by Arthur H. Neumann & Co., also of Des Moines. The main auditorium sat 750 people, and had a stage on the north side. It has subsequently been removed to increase the seating capacity. There was also a room for the city council chambers, which no longer meets here, a Memorial Room for use by the American Legion, kitchen facilities, and a women's meeting room. Across the top of the main facade are three limestone panels with the words "Soldiers," "Sailors," and "Marines" inscribed on them. In the arches above the three doors are inscriptions of the names of important battlegrounds from the three wars. Above the first door are: "Shiloh, Gettysburg, Antietam;" above the second, "Santiago, Manila, San Juan;" and above the third, "St. Mihiel, Argonne, Chateau Thierry." The building was listed on the National Register of Historic Places in 1990.
