= Lake City Public Library (Lake City, Iowa) =

- U.S. National Register of Historic Places
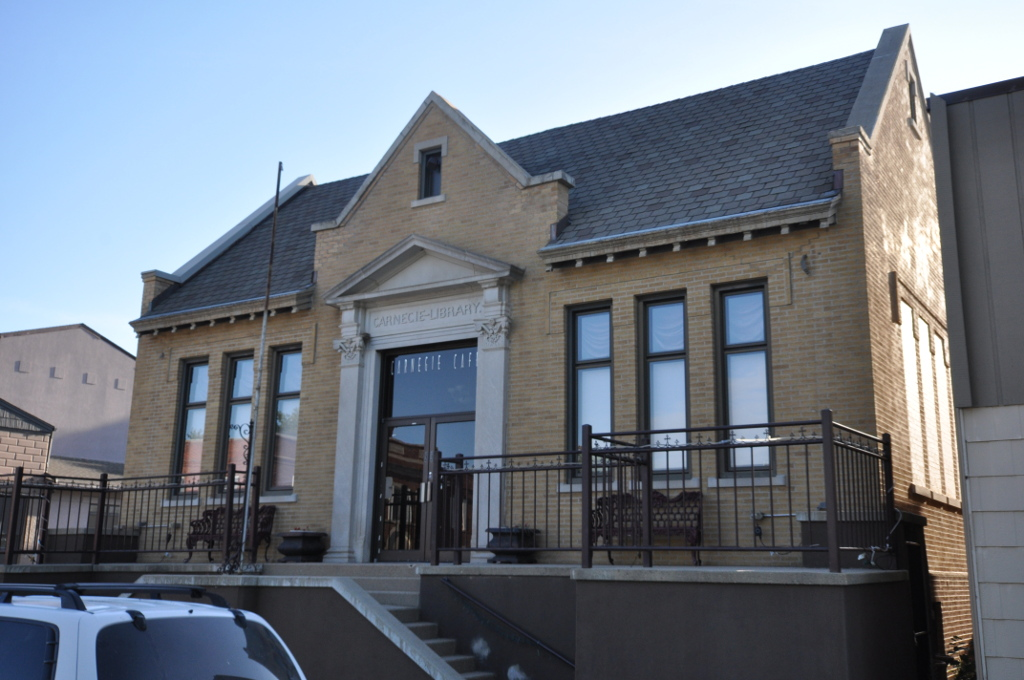

- Location within Iowa Location within the United States
- Location: 120 N. Illinois St. Lake City, Iowa
- Coordinates: 42°16′05″N 94°43′56″W
- Area: less than one acre
- Built: 1910
- Built by: Nelson Construction Co.
- Architect: Edgar Lee Barber
- Architectural style: Classical Revival
- MPS: Lake City Iowa MPS
- NRHP reference No.: 90001209
- Added to NRHP: August 27, 1990

The former Lake City Public Library is a historic structure located in Lake City, Iowa, United States. Efforts to establish a library began as early as 1889 when community socials were held to raise money for books. Women in the community, however, would not form a community library association until 1905. They sought donations of books and money from the community and were able to set up a subscription that year in the old primary building next to Central School. By 1908 there were 1,500 volumes in the library. The Association proposed to the city council in February of the same year that they turn their holdings over to the city for a free library. The council agreed to submit the proposal to the voters and the Association petitioned the Carnegie Corporation of New York for funds to build a new building. They accepted Lake City's application for a grant for $7,500 on May 8, 1908, and approved the library proposal in early June. S.T. and E.S. Hutchison donated the property. Denison, Iowa architect Edgar Lee Barber designed the Neoclassical building that was built by Nelson Construction Company. It opened in April 1910. There was no formal dedication. The building was listed on the National Register of Historic Places in 1990. The community has subsequently built a new library, and this building now houses a commercial business.
