= Lake City station (Iowa) =

- Chicago and North Western Office Building/Passenger Depot-Lake City
- U.S. National Register of Historic Places
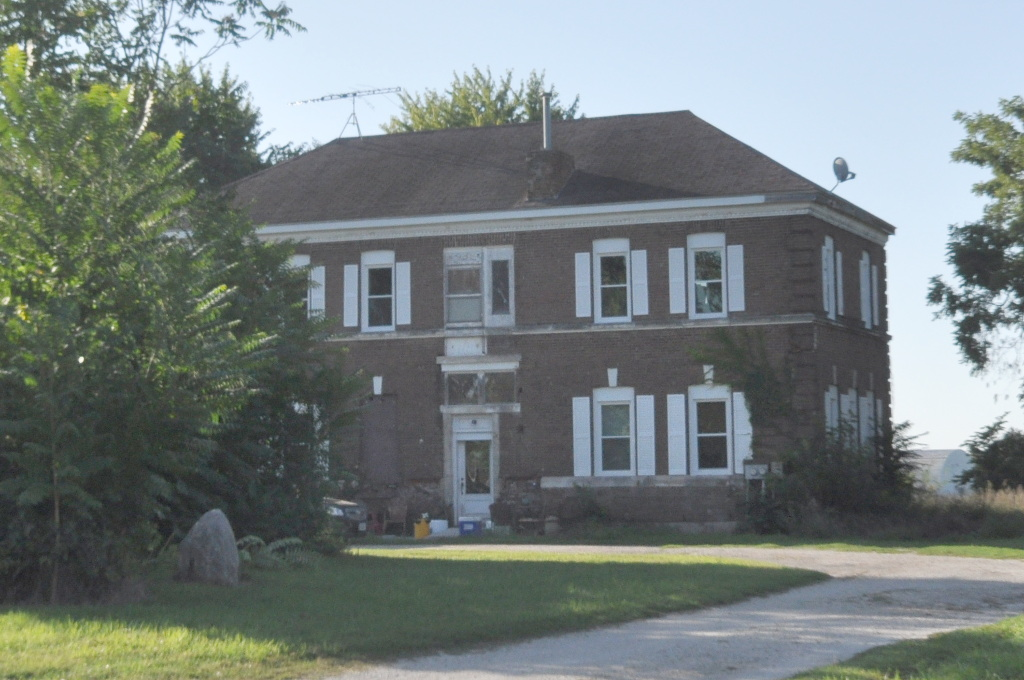

- Location within Iowa Location within the United States
- Location: 401 Front St. Lake City, Iowa
- Coordinates: 42°15′53″N 94°43′46″W
- Built: 1900
- Architectural style: Late 19th and 20th Century Revivals
- MPS: Lake City Iowa MPS; Advent & Development of Railroads in Iowa MPS
- NRHP reference No.: 90001205
- Added to NRHP: September 6, 1990

The Chicago and North Western Office Building/Passenger Depot-Lake City, also known as the Lake City Depot, is a historic building located in Lake City, Iowa, United States. The Toledo & North Western Railroad (TNW) laid the first tracks through town in 1881–1882. Because Lake City was already established, they built a two-story, frame, combination depot and the southeast edge of town. Because of its convenient location, the TNW also built their repair and maintenance shops in Lake City in the 1880s. They placed their division headquarters here in 1887. The Chicago and North Western Railway (CNW) acquired controlling interest in the TNW in June 1881, and ran it separately until it formally acquired it in 1890.

The CNW announced in 1899 that were going to build a new office building in Lake City, and they completed the classically influenced, 2½-story brick building the following year. In 1916 the railroad announced that they were moving their divisional headquarters to Sioux City, and they would convert their office building in Lake City into a depot. The shops remained in town until 1924, when they were closed. The CNW discontinued passenger service after World War II. A freight agent remained at the depot until 1969 when the station closed. The CNW abandoned its line through Lake City in 1972. The building was listed on the National Register of Historic Places in 1990.

Preceding station	Chicago and North Western Railway	Following station
Auburn toward Wall Lake	Wall Lake – Tama	Lohrville toward Tama
