= Gen. Cass and Belle Smith House =

Historic house in Iowa, United States

- U.S. National Register of Historic Places
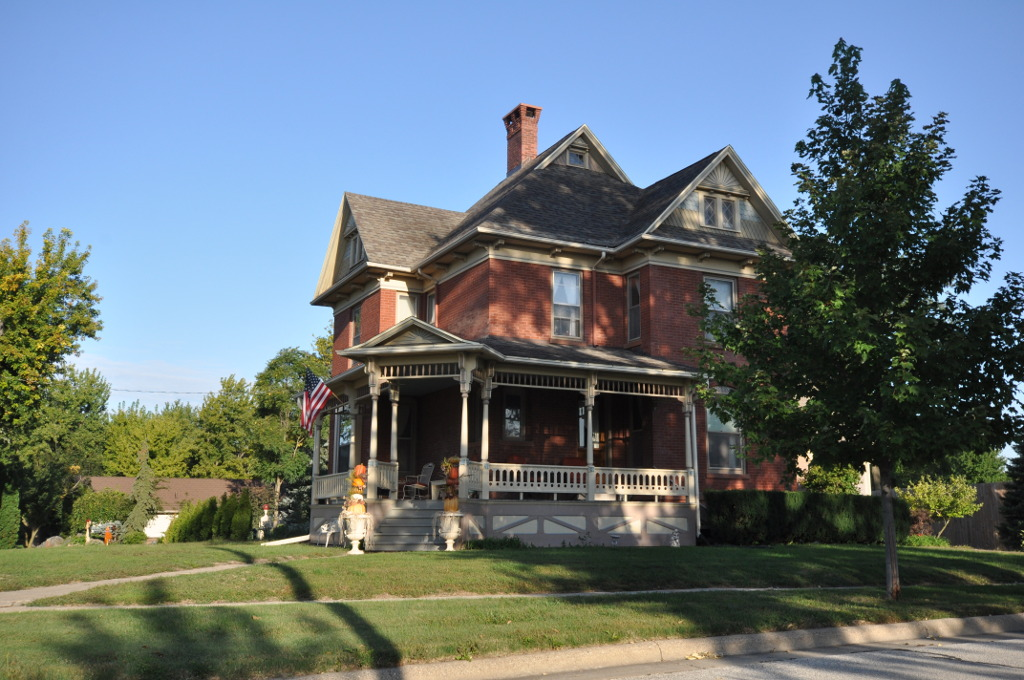

- Location within Iowa Location within the United States
- Location: 500 W. Main St. Lake City, Iowa
- Coordinates: 42°16′03″N 94°44′20″W
- Built: 1901
- Architectural style: Queen Anne
- MPS: Lake City Iowa MPS
- NRHP reference No.: 90001207
- Added to NRHP: August 27, 1990

The Gen. Cass and Belle Smith House, also known as the Smith-Jacobs House, is a historic dwelling located in Lake City, Iowa, United States. G.C. Smith was born in Lake City in 1861, and his parents Peter and Sarah were pioneer settlers here. He was a local businessman who married Lottie Belle Huff in Lake City. They had this 2½-story, brick, Queen Anne house built in 1901. John W. and Bertha Jacobs bought the house from the Smiths in 1913. He was a local attorney and politician. They lived in the house into the mid-1960s. The house was designed by a Racine, Wisconsin architect whose last name was Flagel. The high degree of integrity makes it significant. The asymmetrical, cross-gable structure has a prominent porch on the southeast corner. Between the first and second floors is a beltcourse of rough brick, and there is a bracketed cornice at the roofline. The house was listed on the National Register of Historic Places in 1990.
