= Smith Farmhouse (Lake City, Iowa) =

Historic house in Iowa, United States

- U.S. National Register of Historic Places
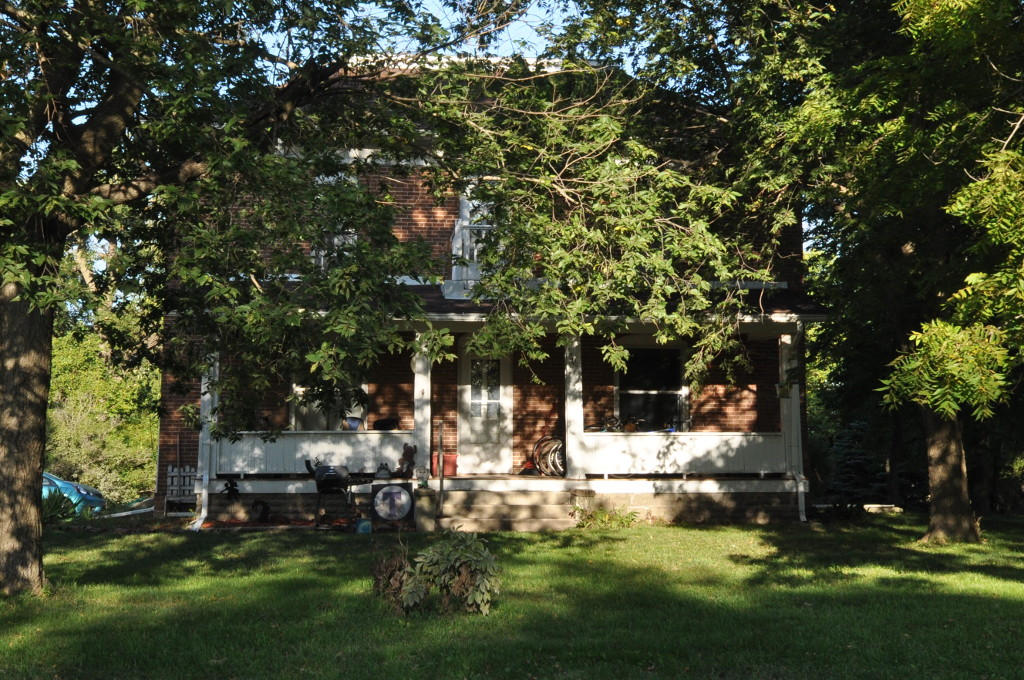

- Location within Iowa Location within the United States
- Location: Junction of Rainbow Rd., S. and Monroe St. Lake City, Iowa
- Coordinates: 42°15′55″N 94°44′47″W
- Area: less than one acre
- Built: 1877
- Architectural style: Italianate
- MPS: Lake City Iowa MPS
- NRHP reference No.: 90001206
- Added to NRHP: August 27, 1990

The Smith Farmhouse, also known as the Smith Homestead Farmhouse, is a historic dwelling located in Lake City, Iowa, United States. This house's significance is due to its association with the pioneer Smith family. Peter and Sarah Smith and their four young sons settled here from Cass County, Michigan in 1855. Their first two houses were built on the same property to the north of this one. Their first house and barn were log structures, and their second was frame construction. What is now known as Lake City was chosen as the county seat for Calhoun County because it was the area with the highest population. (It would lose that distinction to Rockwell City in 1876.) Smith donated 40 acres (16 ha) of land for the town.

Peter and two of his sons opened a general store in town in 1871, and he and his wife moved into Lake City at that time. His son James took over the farming for his parents until 1874. He moved to another farm east of Lake City at that time, but Peter continued to own this property until his death in 1899. It is not known who built this Italianate style brick house in 1877, or lived here until 1890. In March of that year, Peter's third son Clark moved into the house. Peter and Sarah had relocated to Glidden, Iowa before 1875, where she died. He married a Lake City widow named Mary Orr, and they returned to Lake City in 1881. They eventually built a house on Main Street. Mary inherited the farm after Peter's death, and she sold it to James. He lived here until 1921, when he sold it to the Hatfield's. The house was listed on the National Register of Historic Places in 1990.
