= Perry C. and Mattie Forrest Holdoegel House =

Historic house in Iowa, United States

- U.S. National Register of Historic Places
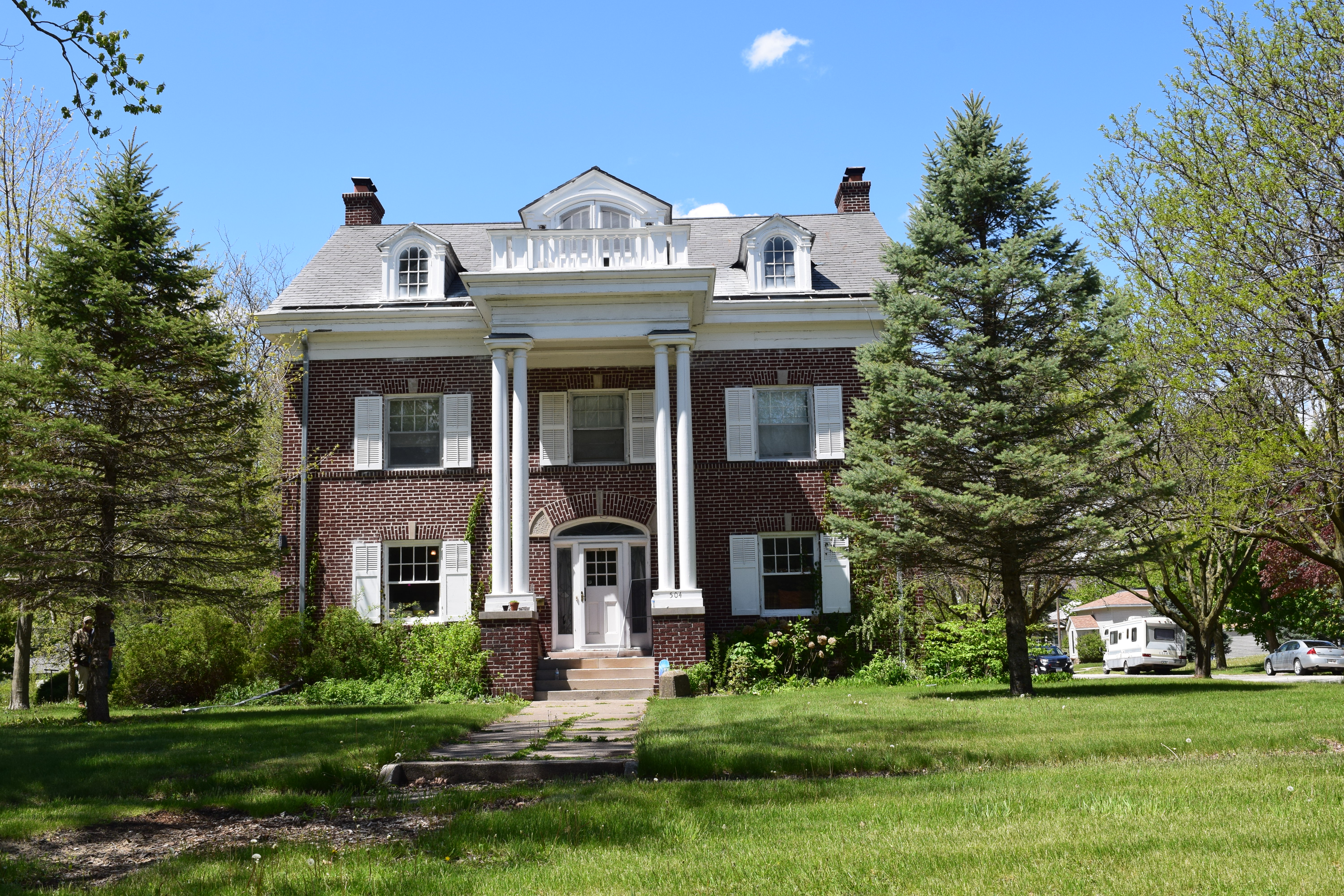

- Location within Iowa Location within the United States
- Location: 401 Front St. Rockwell City, Iowa
- Coordinates: 42°23′40″N 94°38′24″W
- Built: 1917
- Architect: Damon & O'Meara
- Architectural style: Colonial Revival
- MPS: Conservation Movement in Iowa MPS
- NRHP reference No.: 91001831
- Added to NRHP: May 6, 1992

The Perry C. and Mattie Forrest Holdoegel House is a historic dwelling located in Rockwell City, Iowa, United States. Perry C. Holdoegel was a member of the Iowa Senate who was responsible for the legislation that established the state park system in Iowa. It was the first conservation law in Iowa of any significance. He was also responsible for the establishment of Twin Lakes State Park in Calhoun County. The house was built in 1917, the same year Holdoegel entered the state senate. It was designed in the Colonial Revival style by the Fort Dodge architectural firm of Damon and O'Meara. They were also responsible for a similar house in town. The house features a two-story entrance porch that is supported in each corner by three columns of the Doric order, and topped with a balustraded balcony. There is an arched entryway with a fanlight and sidelights. The windows have flat keystone lintels, and functional wood shutters. At the top of the structure is a shallow, molded and unadorned cornice. On top of the roof are narrow gable dormers with arched windows and triangular pediments. The house was listed on the National Register of Historic Places in 1992.
