= Terwilliger–Smith Farm =

- U.S. National Register of Historic Places
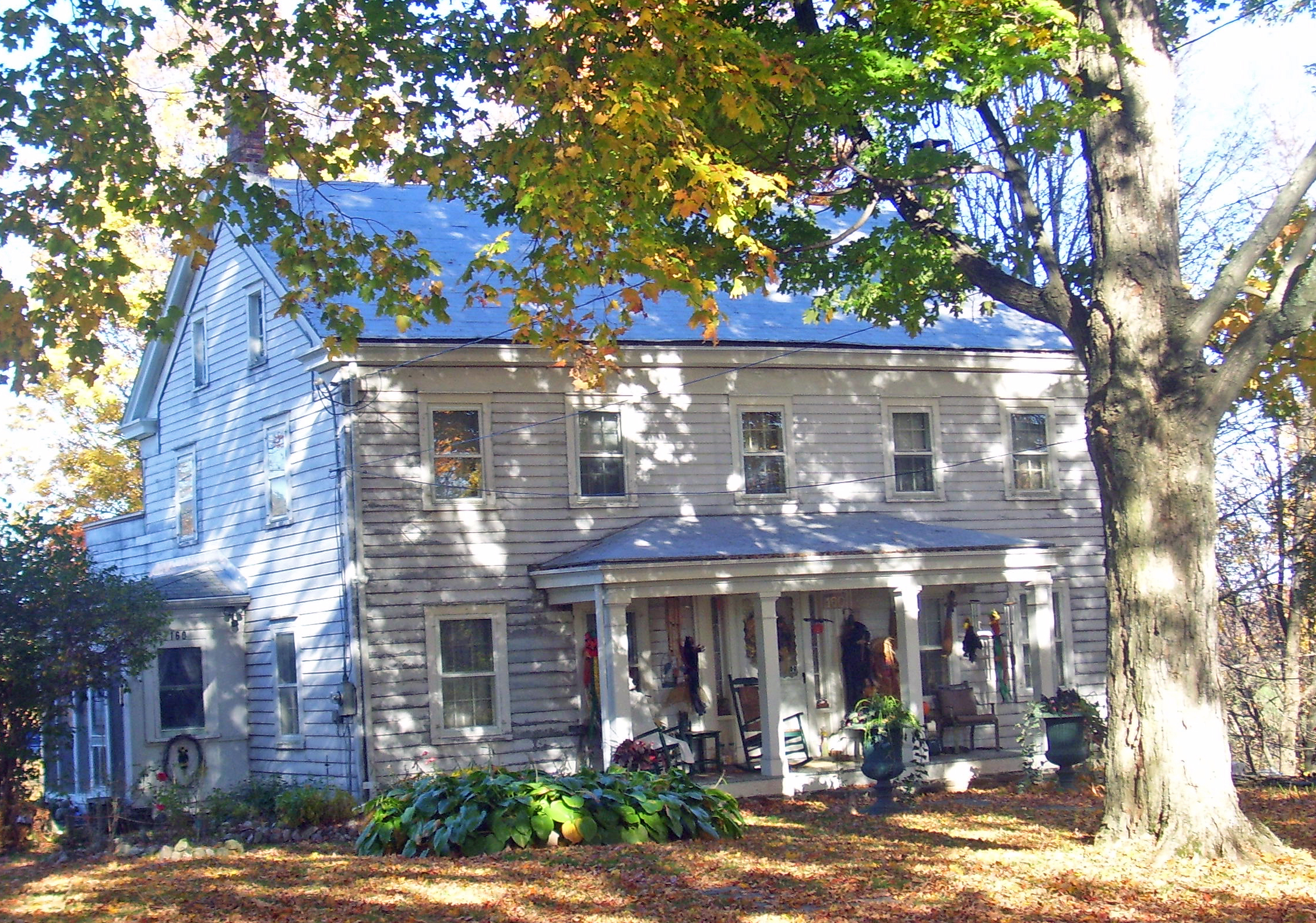
- South elevation of main farmhouse, 2008

- Location within New York Location within the United States
- Interactive map showing the location Terwillinger-Smith House
- Location: Kerhonkson, NY
- Nearest city: Kingston
- Coordinates: 41°47′40″N 74°19′13″W
- Area: 28 acres (11 ha)
- Built: 1830
- Architectural style: Greek Revival
- NRHP reference No.: 02001658
- Added to NRHP: December 31, 2002

The Terwilliger–Smith Farm is located on Cherrytown Road near the hamlet of Kerhonkson in the Town of Rochester in Ulster County, New York, United States. It was established in the mid-19th century.

It has remained on the same lot for its entire existence. With the newest of the farm buildings dating to the early 20th century, it is a rare example of a complete historic farmstead in the county, reflecting different eras in the evolution of local agriculture. It was listed on the National Register of Historic Places in 2002.

== Buildings and grounds ==
The farm is located on the north side of the road roughly one mile (1.6 km) east of Samsonville Road (County Route 3). It is a 28-acre (11 ha) parcel on land that gently drains north to Mombaccus Creek. The open fields in the rear of the property allow views of the eastern ranges of the Catskill Mountains, matched by the view towards the Shawangunk Ridge in the other direction. The surrounding properties are primarily other small farms and residences, with their fields bounded by woodlands.

There are 13 buildings and one site on the property, most of them concentrated around the horseshoe-shaped driveway, sheltered by mature maple trees, to the front. In addition to the house, they include the smokehouse, privy, slaughter house, swine house, hoop shop, granary, chicken house, and tool shed all dating to the mid-19th century. Also on the property are early 20th century buildings including a barn, ice house, milk house, and garage.

=== Main house ===
The house is a two-story, five-bay timber frame structure sided in its original clapboard. It is topped with a metal clad gable roof with snow guards, pierced by brick chimneys at either end. At the roofline is a cornice with returns. All windows are double-hung six-over-six sash.

On the north (rear) there is a one-story shed-roofed extension with raised parapets. A three-bay hip roofed porch supported by four square wooden pillars shelters the main entrance. It is complemented by a one-story screened porch on the west.

The entrance, flanked by sidelights, opens into a center hall with the original wood flooring, trim, and door hardware. A balustraded staircase leads upstairs to the bedrooms. Another stair leads down to the cellar, divided into three rooms. An original cistern is located under the kitchen; the floor retains its original bluestone.

=== Outbuildings ===
At the opposite corner of the property, the barn serves as a counterpoint to the house. It is a four-story gambrel roofed timber-frame structure built into a hillside. Part of the foundation of a predecessor barn that burned down, leaving the farm's one contributing site. The three-bay main block is built of dimensional lumber with novelty siding and a metal roof. A smaller two-story ell projects to the south. Inside is a central drive with haylofts on either side and four standing stalls for horses with haylofts above. Both lofts have an overhead track and fork; the end walls are reinforced with vertical trusses.

A lower level of the barn, built into a hillside, serves as the milking parlor. Its two rows of stanchions run the length have room for 18 cows of the building, with room for 18 cows. North-facing windows provide the light.

It is complemented by a milk house to the east of the barn, upslope from the milking parlor. It is a two-story square building with a gabled metal roof and one door facing the barn. Inside, it has a concrete floor and inground cooler.

Also in the barn's vicinity are an icehouse, chicken house and garage. The first is to the northwest, a one-and-a-half-story dimensional lumber building with novelty siding and no windows. It has a two-level metal door and ventilator atop the roof. The interior walls are sided in shiplap but lack insulation.

To its east is the chicken house, a two-story frame building on stone foundation with novelty siding and metal roof. Its north end is a large roost area with windows facing downhill; the second floor has a loft door. The garage, east the barn along the driveway, is a concrete block structure faced in imitation stonework and topped with a metal hipped roof. It has two bi-fold doors with upper glass panels facing the driveway and a pair of windows on each end.

South of the barn, across the driveway, is the granary. It is a three-story frame building with vertical siding and a metal gabled roof. The north end of the gable is open to allow access to the corn bin on the east, inside slated walls with doors hung from the top to help it dry, and other grain bins on the west. Charring from the barn fire is still present on the inside roof beams. An entrance on the west with stair provides the other access.

A two-story frame tool shed with gabled seamed metal roof is south of the granary along the road. It has novelty siding and a pair of entrance doors on strap hinges facing the road. A line of windows runs up the center of the north gable end.

Between the house and barn, the largest building is the hoop shop. It is also a two-story frame building with seamed metal gable roof, but sided in clapboard instead. A pair of strap-hinged doors on the east end provide access to a cider pressing room, with the remains of the original cider press. Open stairs along the west gable lead to the hoop shop upstairs with built-in workbench lit by three large windows. Next to it, on the east of the upper story, a large bulk storage area could also be accessed from an open loft door on the east.

Behind the hoop shop is the swine house, a one-story frame saltbox building with metal roof and board-and-batten siding. Each of the many pens inside has an upward sliding hatch door to the west and north controlled from the inside by rope and pulley. On the north is a raised bluestone terrace with stone retaining wall on the outside.

A single window and door face toward the slaughterhouse, five feet (1.6 m) to the east. It is a heavy timber-frame building on a stone foundation with wide exposure clapboard siding and standing seam metal roof. Two doors on either side open into a room with the remains of a central brick hearth and flue with 3-foot (1 m) scalding pot.

The next building to the east is the smokehouse, a small square frame building on a stone foundation with clapboard siding and a wood shingle gabled roof. It has a single strap-hinged door. To its north is the two-seater outhouse, a clapboard-sided frame building beneath a metal gabled roof.

== History ==
The lot lines of the farm were established in 1830 and have not varied since. The first person to intensively use the property for agricultural purposes was James Terwilliger, who bought the farm around 1850 when he was in his mid-20s. It is likely he began as a subsistence farmer and built the house and most of the other buildings.

The stand-alone slaughterhouse is the only one extant in Ulster County. The hoop shop reflects the need for subsistence farmers to engage in various trades and crafts to supplement their income. Specialized structures like the swine house and chicken house were erected later on in the century as such structures were developed to maximize yields and farms increasingly began to specialize.

It stayed in his family until Friend Smith purchased the farm in 1919. He would build the new barn, garage, milkhouse and icehouse, reflecting the transition among local farmers from a wide mix of produce to almost exclusively dairy farming, with the railroads allowing them access to the New York City market. The farm has passed through other owners since then, but there have been almost no significant changes to the buildings save for shingle siding on the main house at the time it was listed on the National Register. It has since been removed, restoring the house's historic appearance.

== See also ==
- National Register of Historic Places listings in Ulster County, New York
