= Central School (Lake City, Iowa) =

- U.S. National Register of Historic Places
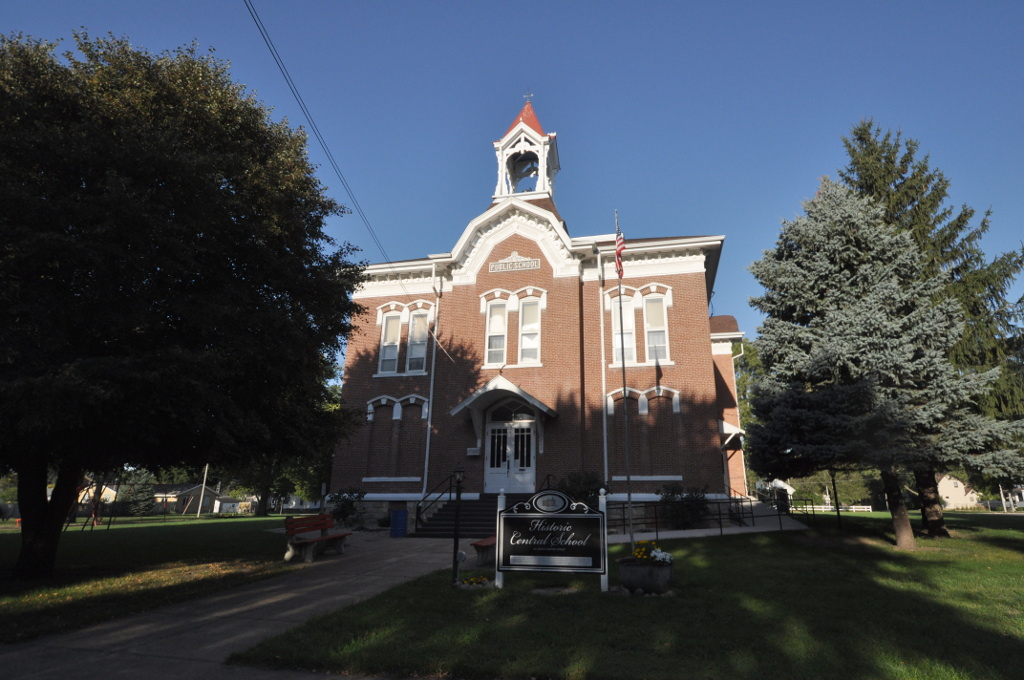

- Location within Iowa Location within the United States
- Location: 201 S. Center; Lake City, Iowa
- Coordinates: 42°15′58″N 94°44′03″W
- Area: less than one acre
- Built: 1884, 1897
- Built by: Robert Harrison
- Architect: Foster & Liebee
- Architectural style: Italianate
- NRHP reference No.: 85000001
- Added to NRHP: January 3, 1985

Central School is a historic structure located in Lake City, Iowa, United States. A bond referendum for a new school passed in February 1884. The Des Moines architectural firm of Foster & Liebee designed the building in the Italianate style, and it was built by contractor Robert Harrison. They based their plan on an example the school board found in Everett's School Architecture. The exterior of the two-story structure is composed of locally produced brick and it cost $7,175 to build. Two classrooms were located on each of the two floors. A frame building to house the kindergarten was built in 1895, and the school board determined the following year to expand the building by four more classrooms. In 1897 the addition was completed, as was another grade school building in town. A high school was built in 1904, which took the pressure off the school's population. The building served as a school building until 1980. It was acquired three years later by Central School Preservation Inc. and renovated for a historic-cultural center. It was listed on the National Register of Historic Places in 1985.
