= Smith Farmhouse (Pasquo, Tennessee) =

Historic house in Tennessee, United States

- U.S. National Register of Historic Places
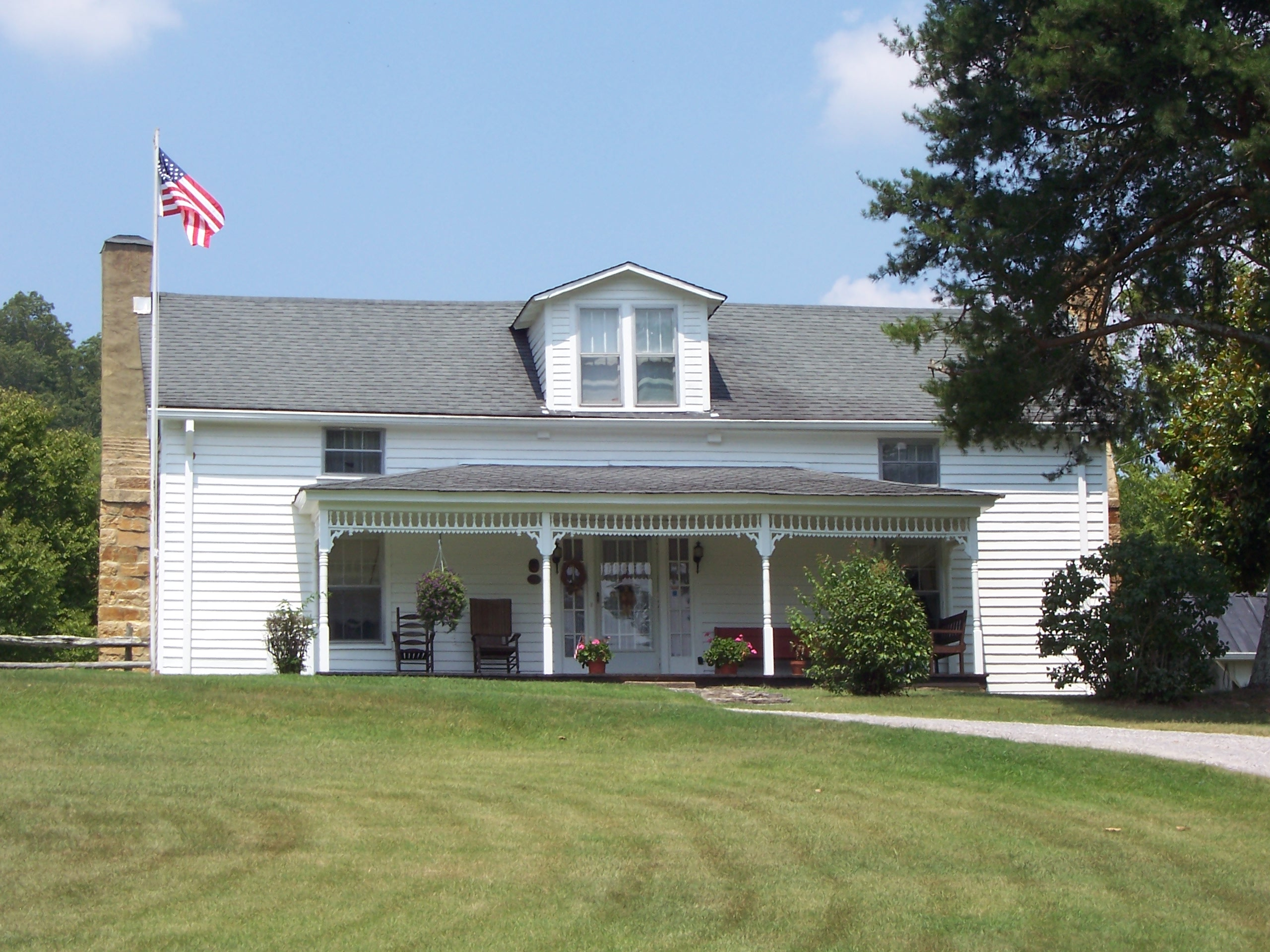
- The Smith Farmhouse in 2005

- Location within Tennessee Location within the United States
- Location: Pasquo, Tennessee, U.S.
- Coordinates: 36.03525°N 86.9812°W
- Area: Original: 5 acres (2.0 ha); Increase: 48.4 acres (19.6 ha)
- Built: c. 1815-1825
- Architectural style: Bungalow/craftsman, Late Victorian
- NRHP reference No.: 83004239 (original); 91000816 (increase)

Significant dates
- Added to NRHP: November 17, 1983
- Boundary increase: June 24, 1991

The Smith Farmhouse is a historic house in Pasquo, Tennessee, USA.

== History ==
The house was built circa 1815–1825, and was redesigned many times. It was the home of James Hyfel Smith (1788-1845) his wife Lucy Greer (1793-1872), and their eleven children. Smith ran a store in Pasquo. After he opened another store in Brush Creek, Tennessee, the house was lived in by his son George Washington Smith and his ten children. Later, another son, Walter Sparel Smith, lived in the house with his nine children. It was then inherited by his son, Charles Benjamin Smith, who lived there with his five sons, and finally by his grandson, Charles Randall Mungovan. Meanwhile, the Smith family continued to run stores in Pasquo and Bush Creek, as well as Una, Tennessee.

== Architectural significance ==
It has been listed on the National Register of Historic Places since November 17, 1983. The boundaries were increased in 1991 to total 53.4 acres of land historically owned by the Smith family, this is what remains of the original 98-acre farm.
