= Lake Creek (Raccoon River tributary) =

Stream in Calhoun and Pocahontas County, Iowa, U.S.

Coordinates: 42.2424834°N 94.7830387°W

Lake Creek is a stream in Calhoun and Pocahontas counties, Iowa, in the United States. It is a tributary of the North Raccoon River.

Lake Creek was named from the fact it flowed from a lake.

== See also ==
- List of rivers of Iowa
