= Lake City, Iowa =

- City
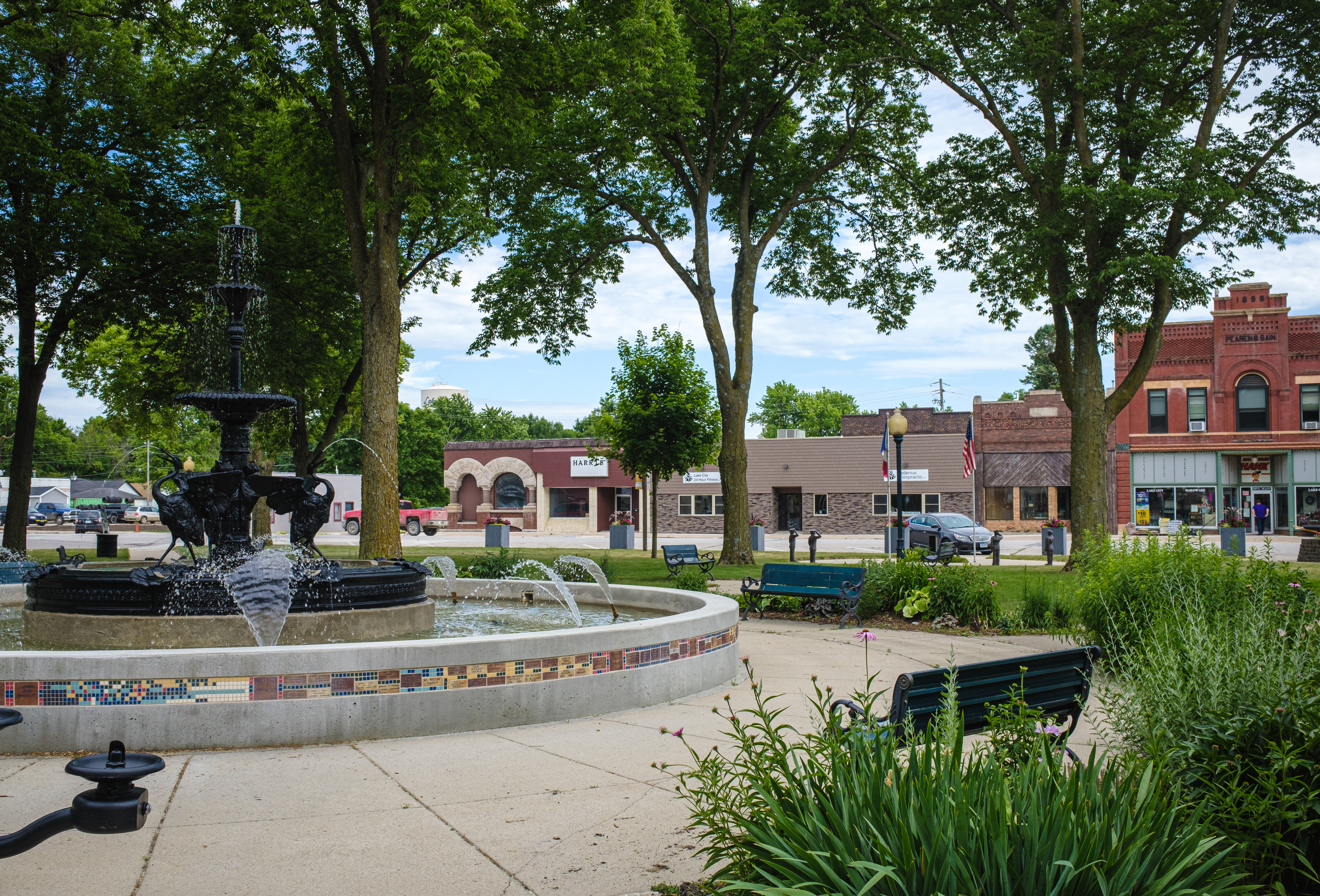
- Town Square
- Motto: Everything but a Lake
- Location within Calhoun County and Iowa
- Coordinates: 42°16′06″N 94°44′29″W
- Country: United States
- State: Iowa
- County: Calhoun

Area
  - Total: 4.82 sq mi (12.49 km^{2})
  - Land: 4.82 sq mi (12.49 km^{2})
  - Water: 0 sq mi (0.00 km^{2})
- Elevation: 1,240 ft (380 m)

Population (2020)
  - Total: 1,731
  - Density: 359.0/sq mi (138.62/km^{2})
- Time zone: UTC−6 (Central (CST))
  - Summer (DST): UTC−5 (CDT)
- ZIP Code: 51449
- Area code: 712
- FIPS code: 19-42465
- GNIS feature ID: 468186
- Website: www.lakecityiowa.com

Lake City is a city in Calhoun County, Iowa, United States, founded in 1856. The population was 1,731 at the time of the 2020 census. The sign coming into town proudly proclaims that Lake City has "Everything but a Lake."

== History ==
Lake City was founded in 1856. Lake City took its name from Lake Creek. The town experienced growth with the advent of the railroad in 1881. On June 9, 1954, the city was struck by an F4 tornado, killing one. On July 14, 2021, the city was struck by an EF3 tornado.

== Geography ==
According to the United States Census Bureau, the city has a total area of 4.81 square miles (12.46 km^{2}), all land.

== Demographics ==
Historical populations
| Year | Pop. | ±% |
|---|---|---|
| 1870 | 103 | — |
| 1880 | 249 | +141.7% |
| 1890 | 1,160 | +365.9% |
| 1900 | 2,703 | +133.0% |
| 1910 | 2,043 | −24.4% |
| 1920 | 2,110 | +3.3% |
| 1930 | 2,012 | −4.6% |
| 1940 | 2,216 | +10.1% |
| 1950 | 2,308 | +4.2% |
| 1960 | 2,114 | −8.4% |
| 1970 | 1,910 | −9.6% |
| 1980 | 2,006 | +5.0% |
| 1990 | 1,841 | −8.2% |
| 2000 | 1,787 | −2.9% |
| 2010 | 1,727 | −3.4% |
| 2020 | 1,731 | +0.2% |
Source:"U.S. Census website". United States Census Bureau. and Iowa Data Center; Source: U.S. Decennial Census

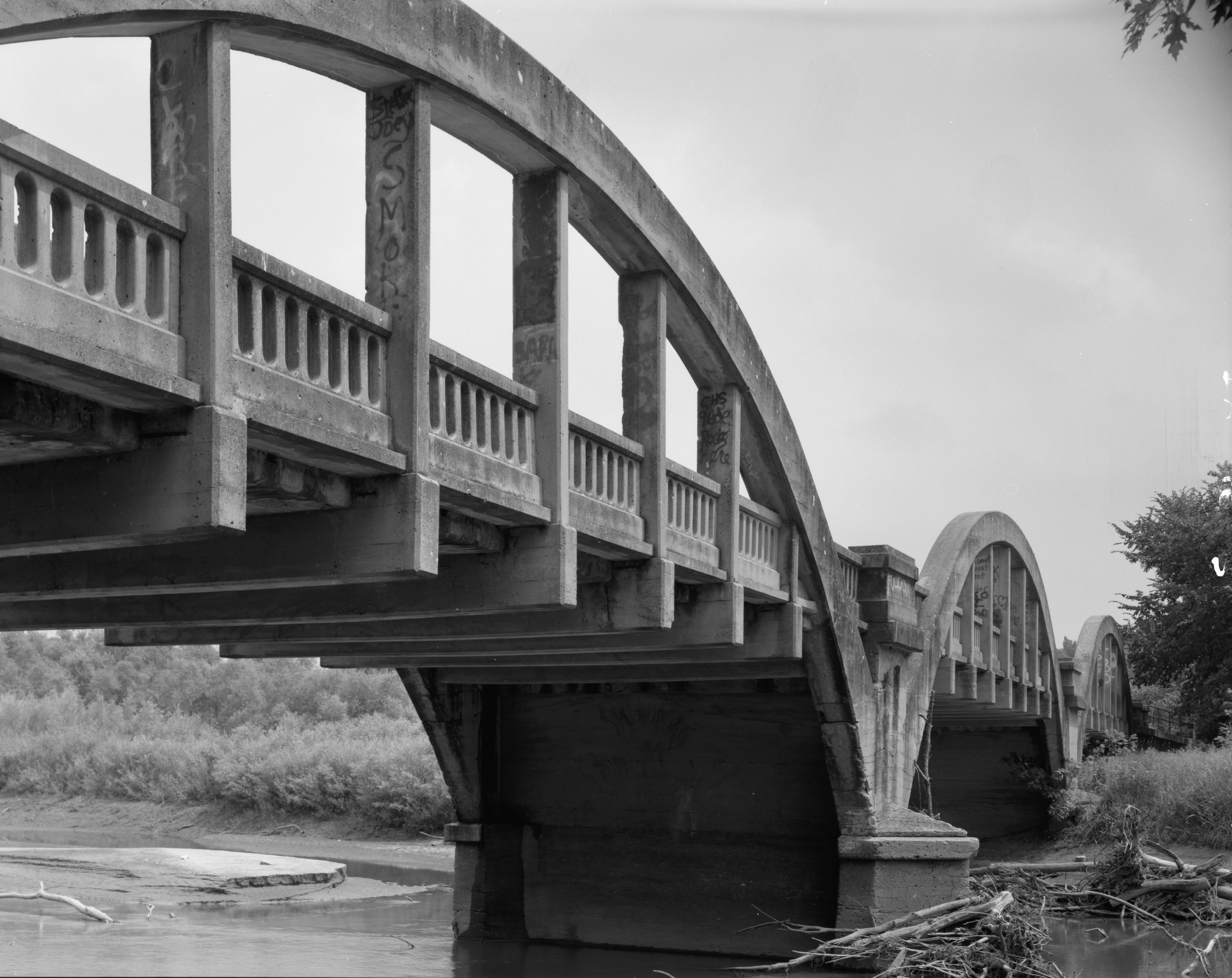
Rainbow Bridge, designed by James Barney Marsh, located over the Raccoon River southwest of Lake City.

=== 2020 census ===
As of the 2020 census, Lake City had a population of 1,731, with 744 households and 455 families residing in the city. The population density was 359.1 inhabitants per square mile (138.6/km^{2}). There were 822 housing units at an average density of 170.5 per square mile (65.8/km^{2}).

Of the 744 households, 22.7% had children under the age of 18 living with them, 45.7% were married couples living together, 7.7% were cohabitating couples, 28.6% had a female householder with no spouse or partner present, and 18.0% had a male householder with no spouse or partner present. About 38.8% of households were non-families; 33.7% of all households were made up of individuals, and 19.0% had someone living alone who was 65 years old or older. There were 822 housing units, of which 9.5% were vacant. The homeowner vacancy rate was 1.4% and the rental vacancy rate was 11.9%.

The median age in the city was 49.2 years. 19.4% of residents were under the age of 18, and 28.1% were 65 years of age or older. 21.4% of residents were under the age of 20; 4.2% were between the ages of 20 and 24; 21.0% were from 25 to 44; and 25.3% were from 45 to 64. The gender makeup of the city was 48.1% male and 51.9% female. For every 100 females there were 92.8 males, and for every 100 females age 18 and over there were 90.1 males age 18 and over.

0.0% of residents lived in urban areas, while 100.0% lived in rural areas.

Racial composition as of the 2020 census
| Race | Number | Percent |
|---|---|---|
| White | 1,659 | 95.8% |
| Black or African American | 3 | 0.2% |
| American Indian and Alaska Native | 1 | 0.1% |
| Asian | 5 | 0.3% |
| Native Hawaiian and Other Pacific Islander | 0 | 0.0% |
| Some other race | 10 | 0.6% |
| Two or more races | 53 | 3.1% |
| Hispanic or Latino (of any race) | 26 | 1.5% |

=== 2010 census ===
As of the census of 2010, there were 1,727 people, 757 households, and 451 families residing in the city. The population density was 359.0 inhabitants per square mile (138.6/km^{2}). There were 846 housing units at an average density of 175.9 per square mile (67.9/km^{2}). The racial makeup of the city was 98.4% White, 0.2% African American, 0.1% Native American, 0.2% Asian, 0.3% from other races, and 0.7% from two or more races. Hispanic or Latino of any race were 1.2% of the population.

There were 757 households, of which 24.0% had children under the age of 18 living with them, 47.2% were married couples living together, 7.8% had a female householder with no husband present, 4.6% had a male householder with no wife present, and 40.4% were non-families. Of all households 37.1% were made up of individuals, and 20.3% had someone living alone who was 65 years of age or older. The average household size was 2.13 and the average family size was 2.74.

The median age in the city was 49.1 years. Residents under 19 composed of 20.2% of the city; 7% were between the ages of 18 and 24; 17.8% were from 25 to 44; 28.7% were from 45 to 64; and 26.1% were 65 years of age or older. The gender makeup of the city was 47.0% male and 53.0% female.

=== 2000 census ===
As of the census of 2000, there were 1,787 people, 779 households, and 468 families residing in the city. The population density was 370.7 inhabitants per square mile (143.1/km^{2}). There were 874 housing units at an average density of 181.3 per square mile (70.0/km^{2}). The racial makeup of the city was 98.88% White, 0.06% African American, 0.06% Native American, 0.22% Asian, 0.11% from other races, and 0.67% from two or more races. Hispanic or Latino of any race were 1.06% of the population.

There were 779 households, out of which 24.8% had children under the age of 18 living with them, 50.6% were married couples living together, 7.8% had a female householder with no husband present, and 39.9% were non-families. Of all households, 36.2% were made up of individuals, and 22.6% had someone living alone who was 65 years of age or older. The average household size was 2.18 and the average family size was 2.85.

Residents under 18 composed 22.6%.of the population, 5.8% from 18 to 24, 19.8% from 25 to 44, 23.0% from 45 to 64, and 28.8% were 65 years of age or older. The median age was 46 years. For every 100 females, there were 81.4 males. For every 100 females age 18 and over, there were 79.0 males.

The median income for a household in the city was $31,000, and the median income for a family was $37,941. Males had a median income of $27,128 versus $18,477 for females. The per capita income for the city was $14,969. About 8.9% of families and 14.1% of the population were below the poverty line, including 20.5% of those under age 18 and 15.3% of those age 65 or over.

== Economy ==
Dobson Pipe Organ Builders, which manufacturers and restores pipe organs, is located in Lake City.

Lake City also has many small businesses, including a hardware store, fitness center, restaurants, shopping and a theatre. Stewart Memorial Community Hospital, a 25-bed Critical Access Hospital, is the largest employer in Lake City with 291 employees.

== Education ==
Lake City is within the South Central Calhoun Community School District.

It was a part of the Lake City Community School District until July 1, 1993, when it merged into the Southern Cal Community School District, which, in turn, merged into South Central Calhoun on July 1, 2014.

In 2007, the Southern Cal district closed the Lincoln Elementary School building and later sold it for $22,000 to a private individual.
