= George Beach de Forest Jr. =

American capitalist, bibliophile and art collector

George Beach de Forest Jr. (October 15, 1848 – July 1932) was an American capitalist, bibliophile, and art collector who was prominent in New York society during the Gilded Age.

== Early life ==
De Forest was born in New York City on October 15, 1848. He was the son of prominent merchant George Beach de Forest Sr. (1806–1865) and Margaret Eliza de Forest (1809–1860). His older brother was Benjamin Lockwood de Forest, who married Kate Louise Knapp, and his cousins included railroad executive Henry deForest and artist Lockwood de Forest.

He was the grandson of Benjamin and Mary (née Burlock) de Forest and the great-grandson of Elihu de Forest, who was a Lieutenant in the 16th Connecticut militia during the American Revolutionary War.

== Career ==
De Forest was a graduate of Columbia University in 1871. His father and family were involved in the dry goods business trade, between the U.S. and the West Indies, with the firm of B. DeForest & Co.

He was a sportsman and noted book collector (selling his library of rare volumes for $300,000 in 1907). Before he retired, he was involved in banking and brokerage services with James Gordon Bennett Jr., J. Pierpont Morgan, Seth B. French, William K. Vanderbilt and Edward Julius Berwind.

=== Society life ===
Both de Forest and his wife were prominent in New York and Newport society. In 1892, George and his wife Anita were included in Ward McAllister's "Four Hundred", purported to be an index of New York's best families, published in The New York Times. Conveniently, 400 was the number of people that could fit into Mrs. Astor's ballroom. The de Forests were known for their extensive entertaining at their cottage in Newport, Rhode Island (Train villa near Bailey's Beach) and their townhouse in New York City.

De Forest was a member of the Metropolitan Club, the Union Club of the City of New York, the Union League Club, the Players Club, the Century Association, the Grolier Club, the Racquet and Tennis Club, the Knickerbocker Club and the New York Yacht Club.

== Personal life ==
On December 4, 1882, de Forest was married to Anita Hargous (d. 1932) at St. Bartholomew's Church in Manhattan. Anita was the second daughter of Louis Stanislaus Hargous, who resided at 435 Fifth Avenue, and Susan Jeanette (née Gallagher) Hargous, and the sister of Robert L. Hargous and Sallie Hargous, who married Woodbury Kane. She was born in Mexico City and her grandfather, Jean Illion Hargous (who resided in Bayonne, France and Philadelphia, Pennsylvania), was a captain in command of the French ship Jason during the American Revolutionary War under Count François de Grasse. They resided at 14 East 50th Street in New York City. Together, they were the parents of Louis Stanislas Hargous de Forest (d. 1907), who died unexpectedly of heart failure at the age of 23.

After the death of their only child in 1907, the de Forests sold their New York City home and traveled abroad for several years. Upon their return to New York in 1917, they resided at the Drake Hotel, located at Park Avenue and 56th Street. George died at the Drake Hotel in New York in July 1932. After their deaths, they were buried in the Hargous Mausoleum at Trinity Church Cemetery in Manhattan.
