= William Storrs Wells =

American Businessman

- Born: October 14, 1849; Albany, New York, U.S.
- Died: May 13, 1926 (aged 76); Paris, France
- Resting place: Sleepy Hollow Cemetery
- Employer: Fairbanks Company
- Spouse: Anna Cole Raynor (before 1926)
- Children: 2
- Parent: Robert Hitchcock Wells; Catharine M. Storrs

William Storrs Wells (October 14, 1849 – May 13, 1926) was an American businessman serving as president and CEO of the Fairbanks Company who was prominent in New York society during the Gilded Age.

== Early life ==
Wells was born in Albany, New York on October 14, 1849. He was the second son of three children born to Robert Hitchcock Wells (1817–1900) and Catharine M. (née Storrs) Wells (1820–1891). Both of his siblings, Frederick Storrs Wells and Evelin Nelson Wells, died in infancy.

== Career ==
Wells served as president and CEO of the Fairbanks Company, an American manufacturing company that built weighing scales.

=== Society life ===
In 1892, Wells and his wife were included in Ward McAllister's "Four Hundred", purported to be an index of New York's best families, published in The New York Times. Conveniently, 400 was the number of people that could fit into Mrs. Astor's ballroom.

Wells was a member of the Union Club of the City of New York and the Metropolitan Club.

In May 1900, Pansy cottage, the Wells summer cottage located at Bellevue and Ruggles Avenues in Newport, Rhode Island, burned down. The fire at the cottage, which had recently been extensively remodeled and enlarged, occurred the day before the Wells were to take up residence at the home. The Wells had purchased Pansy cottage in 1886 from Constant A. Andrews. In 1903, the construction of their replacement cottage, called Chetwode, was completed. It was designed by Horace Trumbauer with gardens by John Russell Pope.

== Personal life ==
Wells was married to Anna Cole Raynor (sometimes Annie) (1854–1935), the daughter of James A. Raynor, president of the Erie Railroad. They maintained a home at 16 East 57th Street, in New York City. Together, they were the parents of:

- James Raynor Storrs Wells (d. 1917), who married Irene Dabney Bishop, a former chorus girl. They divorced after he got out of the U.S. Navy and he remarried to May Molony, a showgirl, in 1912.
- Natalie Wells (1882–1976), who married Harry Twyford Peters (1881–1948) at Chetwode in 1905.

Wells died of pneumonia in Paris, France, after a long illness on May 13, 1926. In 1934, his widow sold their Chetwode, their Newport estate, to John Jacob Astor III. The home was eventually demolished in 1973. As his son predeceased both parents, his daughter was his wife's sole beneficiary in her will. The will provided nothing for the two daughters of their son, James, stating that it was her specific "intention to cut them off absolutely from sharing in my estate."

=== Descendants ===
Through his son James, and James' second wife Mary, he was the grandfather of Marie Storrs Wells and Annette Raynor Wells. Through his daughter Natalie, he was the grandfather of Natalie Peters and Harry Twyford Peters Jr.
