= Buchanan Winthrop =

American philanthropist (1841–1900)

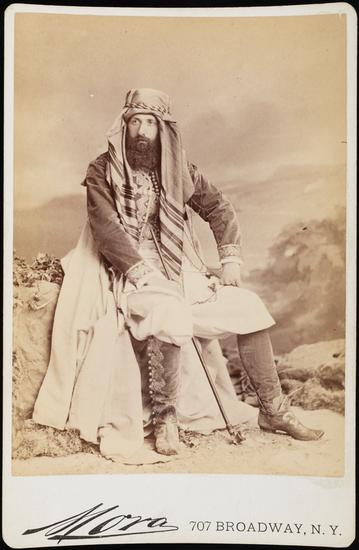
- Born: Thomas Buchanan Winthrop; November 11, 1841; New York City, U.S.
- Died: December 25, 1900 (aged 59); New York City, New York, U.S.
- Education: Yale University; Columbia Law School
- Spouse: Sarah Helen Townsend (m. 1872)
- Children: 2

Thomas Buchanan Winthrop (November 11, 1841 – December 25, 1900) was an American philanthropist and lawyer who was prominent in New York society during the Gilded Age.

== Early life ==
Winthrop was born on November 11, 1841. He was the only son of Henry Rogers Winthrop (1811–1896) and Margaret (née Hicks) Winthrop. After his mother's death, his father remarried to Mary Gelston, the daughter of Maltby Gelston. His sister Harriett R. Winthrop, was married to the Rev. Haslett McKim, and were the parents of Winthrop McKim.

His maternal grandfather was Thomas Hicks. His paternal grandfather was John Still Winthrop, brother of Thomas Charles Winthrop (father of Robert Winthrop) and Francis Bayard Winthrop Jr. (father of Theodore Winthrop), all descendants of Wait Winthrop and Joseph Dudley (both Massachusetts Bay Colony leaders). Through his father's family, he was also descended from the colonial New York merchant and politician Leonard Lispenard.

Winthrop attended the University Grammar School, the Rectory School in Hamden, Connecticut, and graduated from Yale College in 1862 and Columbia Law School in 1864.

== Career ==
After Columbia, Winthrop passed the bar exam and began practicing law in New York City until he "inherited a fortune from his father which made him independent." He then managed the large estate of various members of his family. Bishop Potter appointed Winthrop treasurer of the General Convention of the Episcopal Church, serving for several years.

He was also a trustee of the Metropolitan Museum of Art and from 1891 until his death in 1900, served as a Fellow of Yale University, following the death of Thomas C. Sloane.

=== Society life ===
In 1892, Winthrop along with his wife, daughter Marie, and several members of his extended family, were included in Ward McAllister's "Four Hundred", purported to be an index of New York's best families, published in The New York Times. Conveniently, 400 was the number of people that could fit into Mrs. Astor's ballroom. There were other Winthrop branches included in McAllister's list, but his was considered the elder branch. His wife was a prominent horse breeder who won awards at the Bar Harbor Horse Show in 1904.

He was a member of the Metropolitan Club, the University Club of New York, the Century Club, the Union Club of the City of New York, the Tuxedo Club, the New York Yacht Club, the New York Riding Club, the New England Society, the Bar Association, and the Yale Alumni Association.

== Personal life ==
On June 4, 1872, Winthrop was married to Sarah Helen "Sallie" Townsend (1847–1916), the daughter of Isaac and Mary (née Austen) Townsend. Her sister, Elizabeth Austen Townsend was married to the prominent banker George H. Bend. The Winthrops maintained homes in New York City and in Newport, Rhode Island. Together, they were the parents of:

- Marie Austen Winthrop (1873–1952), who married Morris Woodruff Kellogg, founder of Kellogg Brown & Root, in 1910.
- Henry Rogers Winthrop Jr. (1876–1958), a banker who married Alice Woodword Babcock (1877–1941), daughter of Henry Denison Babcock, in 1905.

Winthrop died on Christmas Day, December 25, 1900, at his residence, 279 Fifth Avenue in New York City. After a service at Grace Church, he was buried at Saint John's and Saint Andrew's Episcopal Cemetery in Stamford, Connecticut. His widow died in Newport in October 1916.
