= Philip Schuyler (born 1836) =

American Gilded Age socialite (1836–1906)

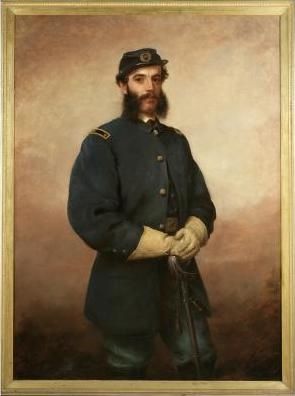
- Born: June 20, 1836; New York City, U.S.
- Died: November 19, 1906 (aged 70); Lynchburg, Virginia, U.S.
- Resting place: Sleepy Hollow Cemetery
- Education: Harvard University; University of Berlin
- Spouse: Harriet Lowndes (m. 1872)
- Parent(s): George Lee Schuyler; Eliza Hamilton
- Relatives: See Schuyler family

Philip George Schuyler (June 20, 1836 – November 19, 1906) was a soldier, clubman, philanthropist, and prominent member of New York Society during the Gilded Age. Schuyler was a descendant of both the Hamilton and Schuyler families, the latter of which he was the de facto head during his adulthood.

== Early life ==
Schuyler was born on June 20, 1836, in New York City. He was the only son of George Lee Schuyler (1811–1890) and Eliza Hamilton (1811–1863). His parents were cousins through their shared Schuyler ancestry as his maternal great-grandmother was his paternal grandfather's sister. After his mother died in 1863, his father married Mary Morris Hamilton (1815–1877), his former wife's sister. His siblings included Louisa Lee Schuyler (1837–1926) and Georgina Schuyler (1841–1923).

His paternal grandfather was U.S. Representative Philip Jeremiah Schuyler (1768–1835) and his maternal grandfather was acting Secretary of State James Alexander Hamilton (1788–1878). His great-grandparents included Revolutionary War General Philip Schuyler and his wife, Catherine Van Rensselaer Schuyler, as well as Alexander Hamilton, the first U.S. Secretary of the Treasury, and his wife, Elizabeth Schuyler Hamilton (the sister of his paternal grandfather).

He graduated from the Lawrence Scientific School of Harvard University and the University of Berlin.

== Career ==
During the U.S. Civil War, Schuyler joined the U.S. Army fighting for the Union Army and fought in the Army of the Potomac, serving alongside Robert Gould Shaw. He retired with the rank of Brigadier General. He was also a member of the Seventh Regiment, New York National Guard.

Schuyler was identified with the New York Life Insurance and Trust Company and was President of the New York Hospital. Schuyler donated several rare Schuyler family treasures to the New-York Historical Society. He was one of the founders of the Ardsley Casino.

=== Society life ===
Schuyler was a prominent society figure who was featured in Ward McAllister's famous "Four Hundred". He was known for his interest in sports and went grouse shooting in Scotland. He was on the Cup Committee of the New York Yacht Club when Lord Dunraven challenged for the America's Cup. He was President of the Union Club of New York, member of the Knickerbocker Club, Harvard Club, Seawanhaka Corinthian Yacht Club, the Hudson River Ice Yacht Club, and the St. Nicholas Society.

He owned a large country home in Ardsley-on-Hudson.

== Personal life ==
On November 2, 1872, Schuyler was married to Harriet (née Lowndes) Langdon (1838–1915), the daughter of Rawlins Lowndes (1801–1877) and Gertrude Livingston (1805–1883). Through her father, she was a descendant of Rawlins Lowndes, the Governor of South Carolina, and through her mother, she was the granddaughter of Maturin Livingston, Recorder of New York City and a member of the prominent Livingston family. Harriet was previously married to Eugene Langdon (1831–1866), a member of the Astor family, with whom she had two daughters: Marion Langdon (1864–1949) who married Royal Phelps Carroll, and Anne Lowndes Langdon (1865–1943), who married Howard Townsend, Jr. (1859–1935).

Schuyler died in a train wreck on November 19, 1906, in Lynchburg, Virginia. He was buried at the Sleepy Hollow Cemetery in Sleepy Hollow, New York. His funeral was attended by many prominent citizens of the time, including J. Pierpont Morgan, Alexander Hamilton III, Joseph H. Choate, Ogden Mills, Gerald Hoyt, and Coleman Drayton.

=== Legacy ===
After his death, his sister Louisa purchased several pieces of eighteenth century furniture "in memory of the late Major Philip Schuyler (1836-1906), who served in the Union Army through the Civil War, a great grandson of Major-General Philip Schuyler," for the Schuyler Mansion in Albany, New York.
