= John J. Wysong =

American lawyer

- Born: John Jelke Wysong; February 12, 1839; Shepherdstown, Virginia, U.S.
- Died: December 21, 1910 (aged 71); Newport, Rhode Island, U.S.
- Occupations: Soldier, lawyer, businessman
- Spouse: Martha Marshall (before 1910)

John Jelke Wysong (February 13, 1839 – December 21, 1910) was an American lawyer who was prominent in New York Society during the Gilded Age.

== Early life ==
Wysong was born on February 13, 1839, in Shrpherdstown, Virginia. His brother was Charles Wysong and his nephew was Marshall Kernochan (father of John Marshall Kernochan).

During the U.S. Civil War, he fought on the Confederate side. He later moved to New York City and became a successful businessman and lawyer. His New York office was located at 44 Pine Street.

== Society life ==
In 1892, Wysong and his wife were included in Ward McAllister's "Four Hundred", purported to be an index of New York's best families, published in The New York Times. Conveniently, 400 was the number of people that could fit into Mrs. Astor's ballroom. Wysong was a member of the Casino Reading Room, The Spouting Rock Beach Association, the Newport Golf Club, the Newport Yacht Racing Association, the Union Club of the City of New York, the Metropolitan Club, the Tuxedo Club, and was a life member of the American Museum of Natural History. The Wysongs were considered "pioneer summer residents of Newport" and had a cottage at Tuxedo Park, New York

At the 1897 Bradley-Martin Ball, Mrs. Wysong dressed as Madame de Pompadour, the famous friend of Louis XV, in a court dress of "pink brocaded stain fell over a front of yellow satin, and she wore beautiful jewels." Wysong dressed in "rich brocades as the Duc d’Anjou at the court of Louis XV."

== Personal life ==
Wysong was married in NYC on November 18, 1875, to heiress Martha Victoria Marshall (d. 1925), the daughter of John Marshall and the sister of Mrs. William Pollock. The Wysongs, who did not have any children, lived at 1 East 76th Street, in New York City.

In 1887, Wysong acquired Greystone, (Note: The residence is sometimes referred to as "Graystone" instead of "Greystone.") a luxurious Romanesque Revival "cottage" on Ochre Point Avenue between Victoria Avenue and Ruggles Avenue, directly opposite The Breakers in Newport, Rhode Island. The home was designed in 1883 by George Champlin Mason for Fitch Bosworth. The interiors were noted for their stained glass, designed by Donald MacDonald for William McPherson & Co. of Boston. Wysong significantly remodeled the home in 1889, hiring architect J. D. Johnston (known for Horsehead–Marbella). The estate was destroyed by arson during the evening of May 31, 1938, and the gateposts and boundary wall survive as the visitor parking lot to The Breakers.

Wysong died at his summer home in Newport, Rhode Island on December 21, 1910, after a long illness. He was buried in Woodlawn Cemetery in the Bronx.
