= James Lent Barclay =

American member of New York society during the Gilded Age

- Born: October 5, 1848; Newtown, New York, U.S.
- Died: July 2, 1925 (aged 76); New York City, New York, U.S.
- Education: Columbia College
- Spouses: Olivia Mott Bell (m. 1894, death) Priscilla Palmer Dixon (m. 1896; death 1924)
- Children: Adelaide Barclay
- Parent(s): Henry Barclay; Sarah Ann Moore
- Relatives: Thomas Henry Barclay (great uncle); Isaac Bell Jr. (brother-in-law)

James Lent Barclay (October 5, 1848 – July 2, 1925) was an American member of New York society during the Gilded Age.

== Early life ==
Barclay was born on October 5, 1848, in Newtown on Long Island. He was the third child and second son of four children born to Henry Barclay (1794–1863) and Sarah Ann Moore (1809–1873). His siblings were Henry Anthony Barclay (1844–1905), Fannie Barclay (1846–1922), and Sackett Moore Barclay (1850–1918).

His maternal grandfather was Daniel Sackett Moore. His paternal great uncle is Thomas Henry Barclay (1753–1830).

== Career ==
Barclay attended Columbia University. He is recorded as matriculating with the class of 1870, but it is unsure if he finished the degree. He was president of the Barclay Realty Company which was located at 299 Broadway in Manhattan. The company managed his family's extensive real estate holdings, generally located near Barclay Street, named for his ancestors.

=== Society life ===
In 1892, both Barclay and his wife Olivia were included in Ward McAllister's "Four Hundred", purported to be an index of New York's best families, published in The New York Times. Conveniently, 400 was the number of people that could fit into Mrs. Astor's ballroom.

He was a member of the Union Club, of which he was a governor, Shinnecock Hills Golf Club, Meadow Brook Golf Club, and the Southampton Club.

== Personal life ==
Barclay was married to Olivia Mott Bell (1855–1894). She was the daughter of Isaac Bell and Adelaide (née Mott) Bell, and the sister of Isaac Bell Jr. (1846–1889), the businessman and diplomat. Before her death, they were the parents of one daughter:

- Adelaide Mott Barclay (b. 1884), who married Algernon "Algy" K. Boyesen (b. 1880), a dramatist who was part of the Lafayette Flying Corps and was the son of Hjalmar Hjorth Boyesen, in 1903. She later married Carlos G. Mayer. Adelaide was the mother of Olivia Barclay Boyesen, who married Dudley William Persse (1901–1976) of the Royal Artillery in 1928, and Allardyce Barclay Boyesen, who married Philippe Hottinguer, the son of Baron Henri Hottinguer, in 1931.

After the death of his first wife in 1894, he married Priscilla Palmer Dixon (1851–1924), the widow of Thomas Chalmers Sloane (1847–1890) of the W. & J. Sloane Company, on April 16, 1896, at her home on West 51st Street in Manhattan. She was the daughter of Courtlandt Palmer Dixon (1817–1883) and Hannah Elizabeth (née Williams) Dixon (1817–1888), a cousin of U.S. Representative and Senator Nathan F. Dixon III, a niece of Nathan F. Dixon II, and a granddaughter of U.S. Senator Nathan Fellows Dixon.

Barclay died at his home, 15 West 48th Street in New York on July 2, 1925. He was buried at Woodlawn Cemetery in the Bronx.

=== Residence ===
Barclays owned a six-acre estate in Southampton, New York, with a 13,000 square foot Colonial Revival home. The home was later owned by producer Martin Richards and Mary Lea Johnson Richards.
