= Wilmerding (surname) =

Wilmerding is a surname. Notable people with the surname include:

- Georgiana Wilmerding Phelps, née Georgiana Wilmerding (1873–1960), American socialite
- John Wilmerding (1938–2024), American professor of art, collector, curator, and author
