= George H. Bend =

American banker

George Hoffman Bend
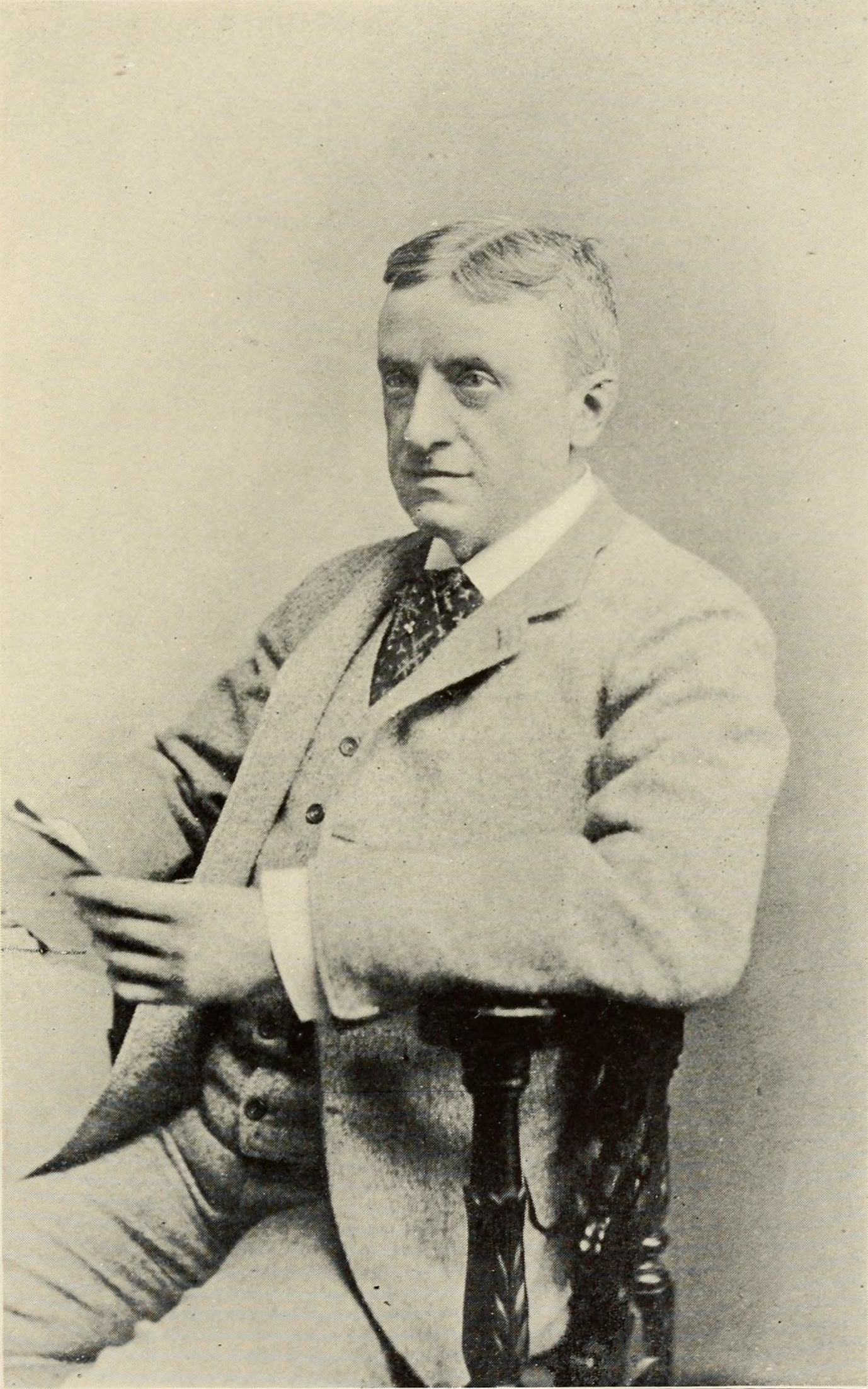
- Born: August 3, 1838; New York City
- Died: February 15, 1900 (aged 61); New York City
- Occupation: Banker
- Spouse: Elizabeth Austen Townsend (m. 1868–1900)
- Children: Amy Bend; Beatrice Bend
- Parent(s): William Bradford Bend; Catherine Ann Thomas
- Relatives: Cortlandt F. Bishop (son-in-law); Henry P. Fletcher (son-in-law)

George Hoffman Bend (August 3, 1838 – February 15, 1900) was an American banker, member of the New York Stock Exchange, and a prominent member of New York society during the Gilded Age.

== Early life ==
Bend was born on August 3, 1838, in New York City. He was the second son of seven children born to William Bradford Bend and Catherine Ann (née Thomas) Bend. His siblings were: William Bradford Bend (1837–1905), who married Isabella Tomes (1840–1916), Katharine Ann Bend (d. 1901), who married James Kennedy Whitaker, and Elizabeth Pelham Bend (ca. 1845–1933), who married Henry Asher Robbins (1829–1914), a founder of the Waltham Watch Company who owned the Asher House in Southampton.

His paternal grandparents were Reverend Dr. Joseph G. Bend, rector of St. Paul's Episcopal Church in Baltimore, who married a granddaughter of Mary Boudinot, sister of Elias Boudinot, president of the Continental Congress from 1779 to 1783. His daughter, Susan Boudinot, married William Bradford, the Attorney General in President Washington's second cabinet.

His maternal grandparents were Philip Thomas and Frances Mary Ludlow, who married in 1807. Thomas, a close friend of Abraham Schermerhorn, was the son of Philip Thomas and Sarah Margaret Weems, daughter of William Weems, of Calvert County, who married in 1782. Frances was the daughter of James Ludlow and Elizabeth Harrison, herself the daughter of architect Peter Harrison. James, the tenth of twelve children born to William Ludlow, was a 1768 graduate of Columbia College and the grandson of Captain George Duncan and Gabriel Ludlow, who established the Ludlow family in America, coming to New York from England in 1694. Gabriel, a father of thirteen, became one of the most successful merchants in New York. Gabriel's ancestry is traced to Edward I of England, and his wife, Margaret, daughter of Philip III, of France.

== Career ==
In 1866, Bend became a partner in the firm "Mowry, Keys & Bend," along with Albert L. Mowry, Richard W. Keys, and Samuel B. Keys.

In 1873, Bend was elected to a four-year term on the Governing Committee of the New York Stock Exchange along with Edward King, John R. Garland, Alfred Colvill, Edward Brandon, G. H. Watson, George W. McLean, Jacob Hays II, Donald Mackay, and John T. Denny.

In January 1890, Bend and Leopold Schepp, a fellow broker, had a heated discussion over whether Schepp had offered a lot of the Sugar Trust certificates at 51, which Schepp denied and Bend claimed. After Schepp told him he had misunderstood him, Bend called him a liar and Schepp then told Bend that he talked "like a food." Bend then punched Schepp between the eyes. After Bends apology to Schepp, several members of the Stock Exchange continued to seek to bring the issue before the Board of Governors. Ultimately, both men were suspended for ten days by the Governing Board. After further deliberations, the suspensions were increased for both, with Bend being suspended for six months and Schepp being suspended for thirty days.

In 1897, Bend celebrated 34 years on the Stock Exchange and the Open Board of Stock Brokers.

=== Residences ===
In January 1882, while at his country estate in Riverdale-on-the-Hudson, a fire broke out and destroyed his home. He had lived in the house for almost 10 years at that point, and had accumulated a sizable collection of rare books, paintings, and jewelry, valued at over $40,000. The mansion, which cost over $60,000 to build, which had brick walls and stone trimmings, stood on a bluff overlooking the Hudson River, was surrounded by eight to ten acres of manicured grounds.

In 1883, they rented a cottage in Newport, Rhode Island. While there, they attended many of the society happenings.

In 1891, they built a cottage at Onteora Park in Hunter which was considered "one of the finest residences in the Catskills." The two story home was 77 ft. by 42 ft., built of stone and had nine fireplaces and five chimneys. All the cottages in Onteora were known by a name, the Bend's cottage was "Sky High."

=== Society life ===
Bend, his wife, and daughters were all prominent members of New York Society during the Gilded Age, attending the most important dinners, balls, dances, cotillions, and donated to many charitable causes. They traveled around the fashionable parts of the Northeast, staying in Newport, Lenox, the Hudson Valley, and the Catskills.

In 1892, all four Bends, were included in Ward McAllister's "Four Hundred", purported to be an index of New York's best families, published in The New York Times.

He was a member of the Union Club, Metropolitan Club, Union League Club, New York City Riding Club, The Players, New York Yacht Club, and the American Geographical Society.

== Personal life ==
On April 21, 1868, he married Elizabeth Austen Townsend (1846–1928), the daughter of Isaac C. Townsend and Mary (née Austen) Townsend. Her sisters were Mrs. Buchanan Winthrop, Mrs. Henry Sackett, and Miss Amy Townsend. They lived at West 54th Street and were the parents of two daughters:

- Amy Bend (1870–1957), who married Cortlandt F. Bishop (1870–1935), in 1899.
- Beatrice Bend (1874–1941), who married Henry Prather Fletcher (1873–1959), a diplomat who served as the United States Ambassador to Chile, Mexico, Belgium, and Italy, in 1917.

Bend died, aged 61, at his residence, 4 East 46th Street in New York, on February 15, 1900. His funeral was held at Grace Church. His wife received his life insurance policy of $40,000. After his death, his widow lived with their younger daughter at 563 Park Avenue.

=== Descendants ===
His only grandchild was Beatrice Bishop (1902–1993), an author and prominent physician who married Adolf A. Berle, Jr. (1895–1971), a diplomat. After his death, she married Dr. André Frédéric Cournand (1895–1988), a physician who was awarded the Nobel Prize for medicine in 1956.

His nephew, Henry "Harry" Pelham Robbins (1874–1946), was married to Emily Welles (1888–1946), sister of Ambassador Sumner Welles (1892–1961), and a grandniece of the Mrs. Astor, Caroline Schermerhorn Astor (1830–1908). His niece, Maud Robbins, who married Harry Whitney McVicker (1860–1905), in 1891.
