= Anne Dunkin Greene =

- Born: Anne Dunkin Greene c. 1885; New York City, U.S.
- Died: November 2, 1939 (aged 53–54)
- Education: Bryn Mawr College
- Spouse: Guy Bates (m. 1908)
- Children: 1
- Relatives: Alexander Henry Hoff (grandfather)

Anne Dunkin Greene Bates (c. 1885 – November 2, 1939) was an American socialite during the Gilded Age.

== Early life ==
Anne Dunkin Greene was born in New York City in c. 1885, a daughter of Elizabeth Dunkin (née Hoff) Greene (1852–1926) and Thomas Lyman Greene (1851–1904). Her father was vice president and general manager of the Audit Company of New York and formerly with the Manhattan Trust Company. Her older brother was Van Rensselaer Hoff Greene, a 1904 graduate of Columbia University, who married Agnes Benedict.

Her maternal grandparents were Ann Eliza (née Van Rensselaer) Hoff and Dr. Alexander Henry Hoff of Philadelphia. Her grandmother was a sister of Charles Watkins Van Rensselaer and both were children of Ann (née Dunkin) and Judge John Sanders Van Rensselaer and grandchildren of U.S. Representative Killian Van Rensselaer. Her paternal grandfather was Mary Ann (née Crocker) Greene, who attended the Troy Female Seminary, and Thomas Lyman Greene Sr., a manager of the Boston and Albany Railroad.

Anne graduated from Bryn Mawr College in 1905.

== Society life ==
In 1892, Anne, listed as "Miss Greene", (Note: According to Jerry E. Patterson, "Of the many Misses Greene in New York Society, this was probably Annie D. Greene (died 1940) who married Guy Bates, Columbia 1906.") was included in Ward McAllister's "Four Hundred", purported to be an index of New York's best families, published in The New York Times. Conveniently, 400 was the number of people that could fit into Mrs. Astor's ballroom.

== Personal life ==
In 1908, Greene was married to Guy Bates (1880–1965) of Morristown and Summit, New Jersey. Bates was a 1906 graduate of Columbia University. Together, they were the parents of:

- Elizabeth Maunsell Bates (1913–2011), who married attorney Alan W. Carrick, the son of Judge Charles Lynn Carrick, in 1939.

Anne Dunkin Greene Bates died on November 2, 1939. She was buried at Arlington National Cemetery and upon her husband's death in 1965, he was buried alongside her.

=== Descendants ===
Through her daughter Elizabeth, she was the grandmother of Robert Duncan Carrick (b. 1943), who gifted her family's silver bowl to Newark Museum.
