= Robert Kerr Richards =

American socialite in the Gilded Age

- Born: August 26, 1834
- Died: December 31, 1924 (aged 90); New York City, New York, U.S.
- Education: Yale University; Massachusetts Institute of Technology
- Parent(s): William H. Richards; Maria Kerr Richards

Robert Kerr Richards (August 26, 1834 – December 31, 1924) was an American who was prominent in New York Society during the Gilded Age.

== Early life ==
Richards was born on August 26, 1834. He was the son of William H. Richards (1808–1881) and Maria E. (née Kerr) Richards (1806–1879).

He namesake was his uncle Robert Kerr Richards (1806–1874), a Yale and Litchfield Law School graduate who married Matilda Lamb (1806–1854), the daughter of General Anthony Lamb (son of Revolutionary War General John Lamb). Another uncle, Timothy Pickering Richards was married to Agnes Treat Lamb, the sister of his aunt Matilda. His niece was Sarah F. Richards of Black Stump Road in Queens.

Richards attended Yale University, where he was a member of the Sigma chapter of Delta Psi fraternity, and Massachusetts Institute of Technology, where he was a member of the Tau Chapter of Delta Psi Fraternity.

== Society life ==
In 1892, Richards was included in Ward McAllister's "Four Hundred", purported to be an index of New York's best families, published in The New York Times. Conveniently, 400 was the number of people that could fit into Mrs. Astor's ballroom. Richards regularly attended the Patriarchs Ball (founded by McAllister in 1872) and many society events including musicales at the Waldorf, performances at the Metropolitan Opera, and the Bradley-Martin Ball in 1897.

== Personal life ==
Richards had a home in Bayside on Long Island known as Greenoak Farm.

Richards died after a brief illness on Wednesday morning, December 31, 1924. His funeral was held at St. James's Chapel at the Cathedral of St. John the Divine and he was buried at Grace Episcopal Churchyard in Queens. His niece Sarah was the executrix of his estate.
