= Worthington Whitehouse =

American real estate broker and member of New York Society

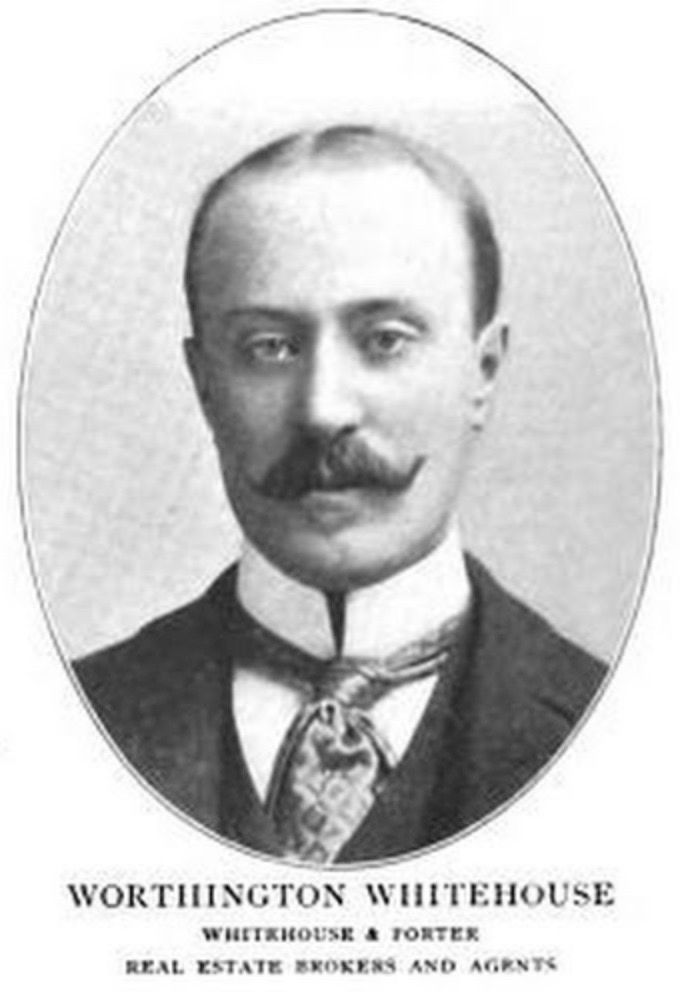
- Born: October 1864; Irvington, New York
- Died: February 14, 1922 (aged 75–76); Elmsford, New York
- Education: St. John's School
- Parent(s): Edward M. Whitehouse; Amelia Stuart Newton Worthington
- Relatives: Henry Rossiter Worthington (grandfather); Charles Campbell Worthington (uncle); Whitehouse family

Worthington Whitehouse (October 1864 – February 14, 1922) was an American real estate broker and member of New York Society during the Gilded Age who was known for leading cotillions.

== Early life ==
He was born in October 1864 in Irvington, New York. He was the son of Amelia Stuart Newton Worthington (d. 1901) and Edward M. Whitehouse (d. 1870), his mother's first husband whom she married in 1863. After his father died, his mother remarried to Thomas Whiteside Rae. His full-brother was Edward Whitehouse (1866–1894) and his half-brothers were Izard Newton Whiteside Rae and Thomas Rae.

His paternal grandparents were Edward Whitehouse and Julia (née Cammann) Whitehouse, of the prominent Cammann Knickerbocker family. His uncle was James Henry Whitehouse, dean of the New York Stock Exchange and his cousin was Sheldon Whitehouse, U.S. Ambassador to Guatemala and Colombia. His maternal grandparents were Henry Rossiter Worthington (1817–1880), who invented the first direct-acting steam pump, and Sara Jane (née Newton) Worthington (1817–1893), herself the daughter of Commodore John Thomas Newton of Alexandria, Virginia. His uncle was Charles Campbell Worthington (1854–1944), who took over his grandfather's Worthington Corporation. His grand-nephew through his brother Izard, was Thomas Newton Whiteside Rae (d. 2011). His niece was Edwina Worthington Whitehouse, who married Gregory Van Sicklen McLoughlin, a painter, and committed suicide in 1923.

He was educated in New York, taking a class at St. John's School, and then abroad to complete his studies. After graduation, he spent three years traveling, including in Africa.

== Career ==
After returning to the United States, he joined Edward Sweet & Co., bankers, working with them for three years. His cousin Henry Worthington Bull (1874–1958), the son of his maternal aunt Sara Newton Worthington and her husband William Lauman Bull, also worked at Edward Sweet & Co.

Following Edward Sweet & Co., he joined with Edward Ludlow Hall (1872–1932) in real estate ventures. He later formed a partnership known as Mills & Whitehouse. It was dissolved and he joined John N. Golding to form Golding & Whitehouse, later Whitehouse & Porter with Clarence Porter, the only surviving son of Gen. Horace Porter, the U.S. Ambassador to France. After Porter's death, Whitehouse later founded his own real estate firm, Worthington Whitehouse Inc. in 1915, which rented and sold properties in New York, especially along Fifth Avenue and in Murray Hill, and in Newport, Rhode Island.

In 1921, he stepped down as president of his firm, Worthington Whitehouse Company, Inc., and appointed Newton Rae, his relative who was a friend of Albert Eugene Gallatin, as president in his place. In 1935, several years after his death, his firm was dissolved and its president, Newton Rae, and officers joined Douglas L. Elliman & Co.

=== Society life ===
Whitehouse was a member of the infamous "Four Hundred" of New York Society, as dictated by Mrs. Astor and Ward McAllister and published in The New York Times on February 16, 1892. He was known for being the master of the cotillion, along with Cathleen Neilson Vanderbilt, the wife of Reginald Claypoole Vanderbilt. In 1914, he accompanied Alfred Gwynne Vanderbilt, among others, to the opening of Verdi's Un ballo in maschera at the Metropolitan Opera.

He was a member of the Knickerbocker Club, Racquet and Tennis Club, and was a member of the Delta Phi fraternity.

Whitehouse, who did not marry, died on February 14, 1922, at his home, Worthington Farms in Elmsford, New York.
