= The Four Hundred (Gilded Age) =

Social status listing

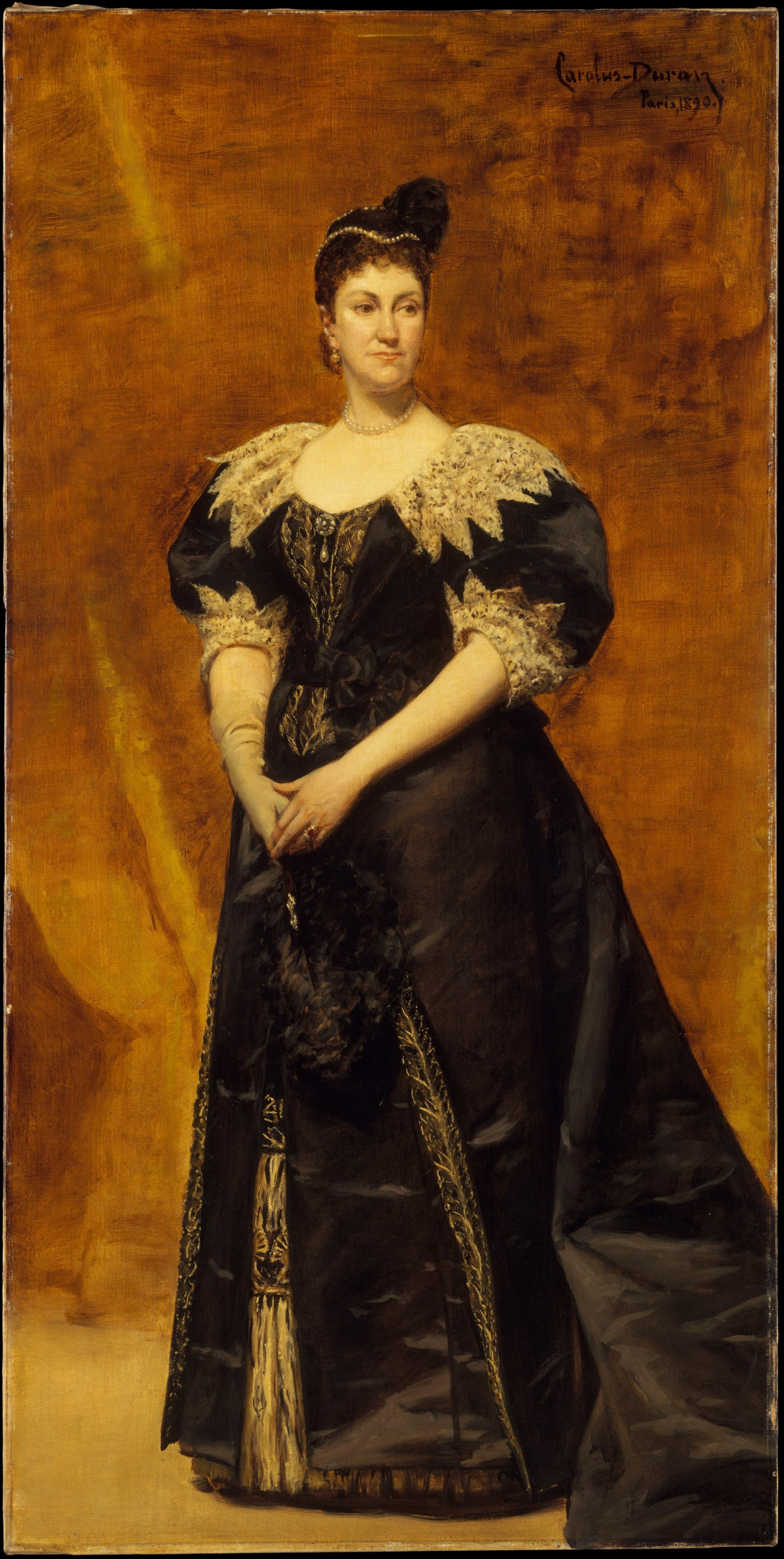
Portrait of Mrs. Astor by Carolus-Duran, in Paris 1890. This painting was placed prominently in Astor's house; she would stand in front of it when receiving guests for receptions. Today, it is held by the Metropolitan Museum of Art.

The Four Hundred was a list of New York society during the Gilded Age, a group that was led by Caroline Schermerhorn Astor, the "Mrs. Astor", for many years. After her death, her role in society was filled by three women: Mamie Fish, Theresa Fair Oelrichs, and Alva Belmont, known as the "triumvirate" of American society.

On February 16, 1892, The New York Times published the "official" list of those included in the Four Hundred as dictated by social arbiter Ward McAllister, Astor's friend and confidant, in response to lists proffered by others, and after years of clamoring by the press to know who was on it.

== History ==
In the decades following the American Civil War, the population of New York City grew almost exponentially, and immigrants and wealthy arrivistes from the Midwestern United States began challenging the dominance of the old New York Establishment. Aided by McAllister, Astor (Note: McAllister called Mrs. Astor "the Mystic Rose," referring to the "figure in Dante's Paradise around whom all in Paradise revolve,") attempted to codify proper behavior and etiquette, as well as determine who was acceptable among the arrivistes, as champions of old money and tradition.

Reportedly, McAllister coined the phrase "the Four Hundred" by declaring that there were "only 400 people in fashionable New York Society." According to him, this was the number of people in New York who really mattered; the people who felt at ease in the ballrooms of high society. In 1888, McAllister told the New-York Tribune that "If you go outside that number," he warned, "you strike people who are either not at ease in a ballroom or else make other people not at ease."

While the number four hundred has popularly been linked to the capacity of Caroline Schermerhorn Astor's ballroom at her large brownstone home at 350 Fifth Avenue and West 34th Street (today the site of the Empire State Building), the exact origins remain unknown. There were other lists in New York around the same time which necessitated a maximum capacity of four hundred, including Delmonico's restaurant and local cotillion dances, that may have contributed to the particular sum of four hundred.

=== February 1892 list ===
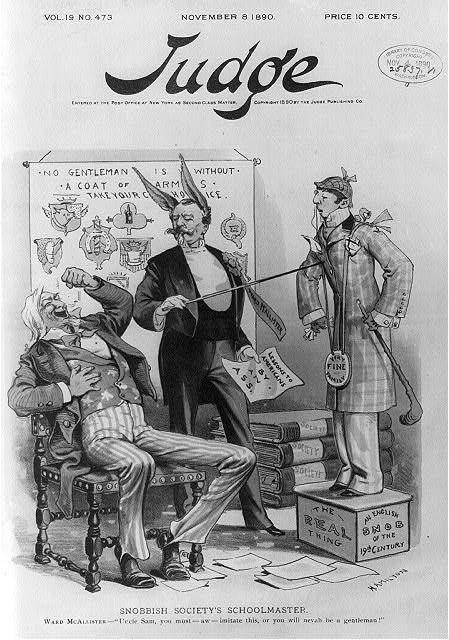
"Snobbish Society's Schoolmaster." Caricature of Ward McAllister as an ass telling Uncle Sam he must imitate "an English snob of the 19th century" or he "will nevah be a gentleman". Published in Judge, November 8, 1890.

In response to competing lists naming the purported members of New York society published in the New York World that insisted New York society was, in fact, made up of only 150 people, McAllister spoke with the Times, refuting the World article and giving the paper the "official list", which was published on February 16, 1892, and quoted McAllister stating:

The so-called Four Hundred has not been cut down or dwindled to 150 names. The nonsense, don't you know, printed to that effect in the World and some other papers, has made a very bad impression that will reflect badly against them, you understand. That list of names, you understand, printed on Sunday, did not come from me, don't you see. It is unauthorized, don't you see. But it is accurate as far as it goes, you understand.

It is incomplete and does injustice, you understand, to many eligible millionaires. Think of leaving out such names, don't you know, as Chauncey M. Depew, Gen. Alexander S. Webb, Mr. and Mrs. Edward Cooper, Mr. and Mrs. Luther Kountze, Mr. and Mrs. Robert Goelet, Mr. and Miss Wilson, Miss Greene, and many others! Don't you understand, it is absurd, senseless.

Let me explain, don't you know. There are three dinner dances, don't you know, during the season, and the invitations, don't you see, are issued to different ladies and gentlemen each time, do you understand? So at each dinner dance, you know, are only 150 people of the highest set, don't you know. So, during the season, you see, 400 different invitations are issued.

Wait a moment and I will give you a correct list, don't you know, of the people who form what is known as the Four Hundred. Do you understand it will be authorized, reliable, and, don't you know, the only correct list.

The list, purported to include the crème de la crème of New York society, consisted largely of "bankers, lawyers, brokers, real estate men, and railroaders, with one editor (Paul Dana of The New York Sun), one publisher, one artist, and two architects." It also included a mix of both "Nobs" and "Swells". "Nobs" came from old money (including the Astors, the Goelets, the Livingstons, and the Van Rensselaers), and "Swells" were representatives of the nouveau riche, whom Astor felt, begrudgingly, were able to partake in polite society (best personified by the Vanderbilt family).

=== Criticism and backlash ===
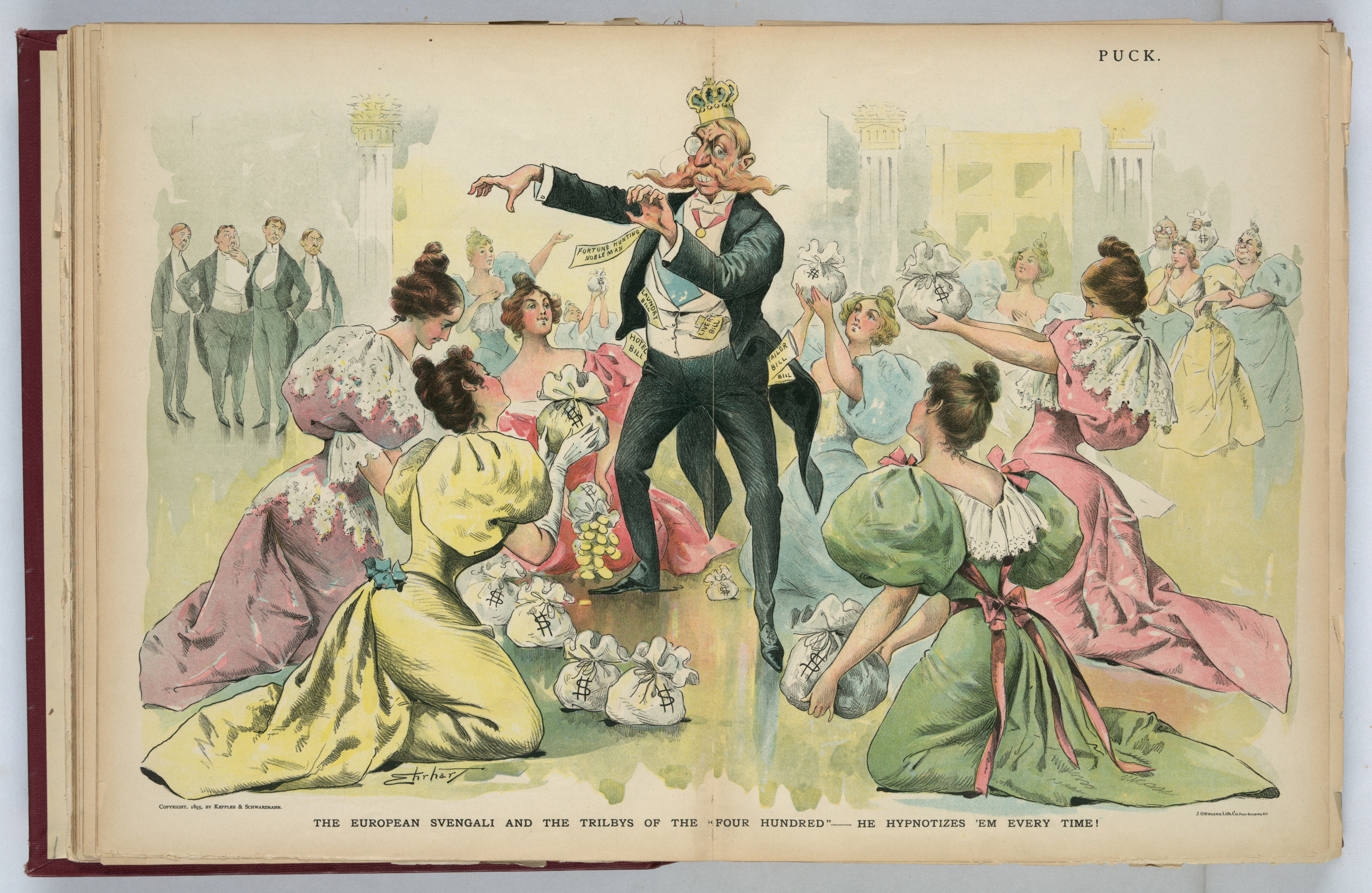
"The European Svengali and the trilbys of the 'Four Hundred' – He hypnotizes 'em every time!" Illustration published in Puck, October 2, 1895.

After McAllister released the names of the Four Hundred in The New York Times, there was significant backlash, both against the idea of a definitive list of "acceptable society" and McAllister himself. The papers dubbed him "Mr. Make-a-Lister" and, in combination with his memoirs published in 1890, entitled Society as I Have Found It, further ostracized him from the "old guard", who valued their privacy in an era when the leaders of society were the equivalent of modern movie stars. William d'Alton Mann, who owned Town Topics, a gossip magazine, considered it his duty to expose the sins of society and regularly criticized the Four Hundred.

Several years later, author O. Henry released a collection of short stories, entitled The Four Million, a reaction to this phrase, expressing his opinion that every human being in New York was worthy of notice.

In 2009, the Museum of the City of New York compiled its own list, entitled "The New York City 400", of the 400 "movers and shakers" who made a difference in the 400 years of New York City history since Henry Hudson arrived in 1609. McAllister was "the only person on the original Four Hundred to also make the museum's list."

== Named members ==
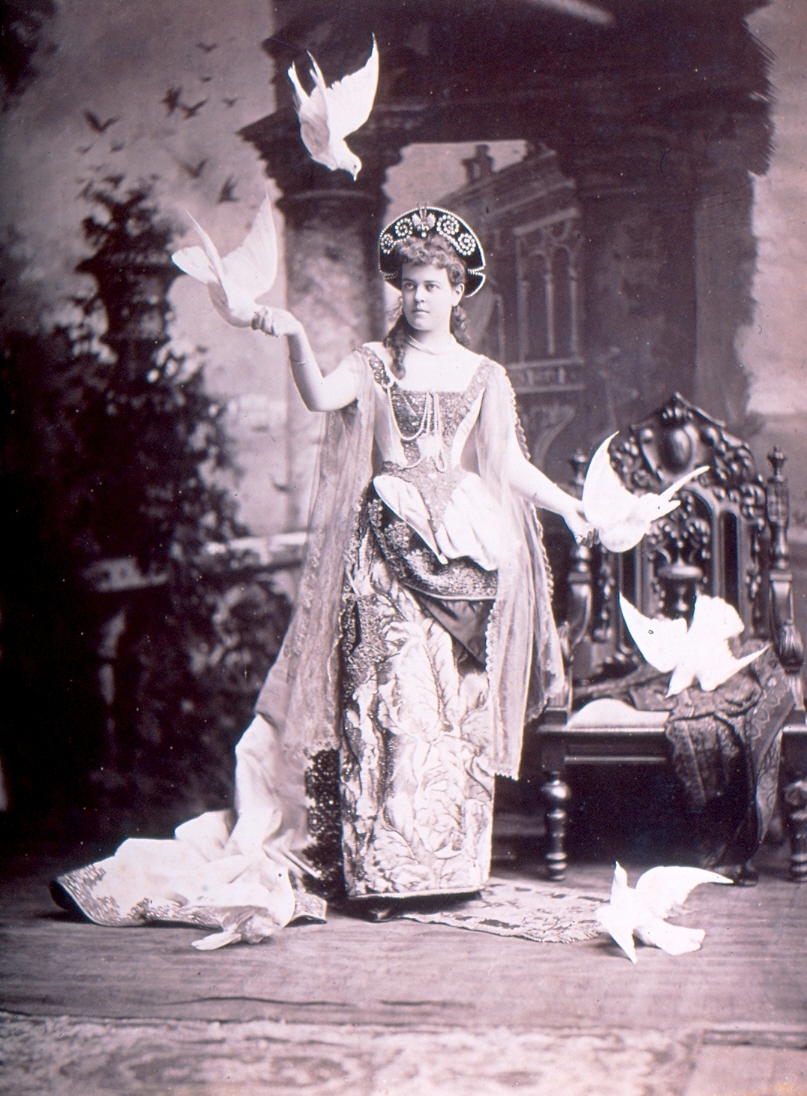
Photograph of Alva Smith Vanderbilt at her 1883 Ball as "Venetian Renaissance Lady". Alva, the first wife of William Kissam Vanderbilt and second wife of Oliver Belmont, was one of Astor's successors. Photographed by José Maria Mora.

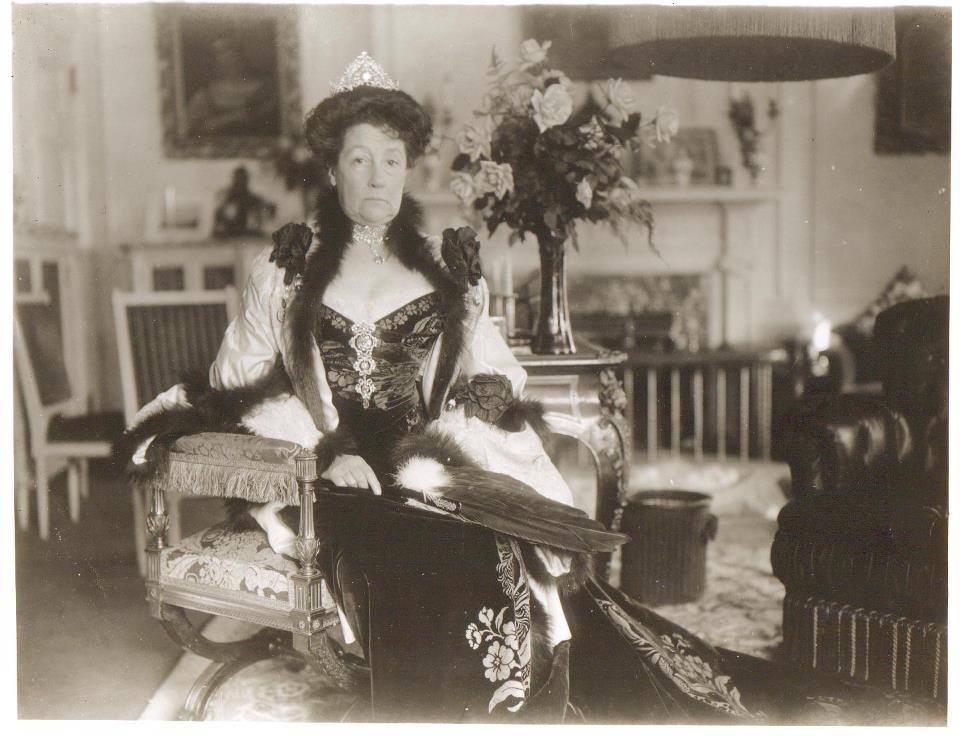
Photograph of Mamie Fish, the wife of Stuyvesant Fish, and one of Astor's successors.

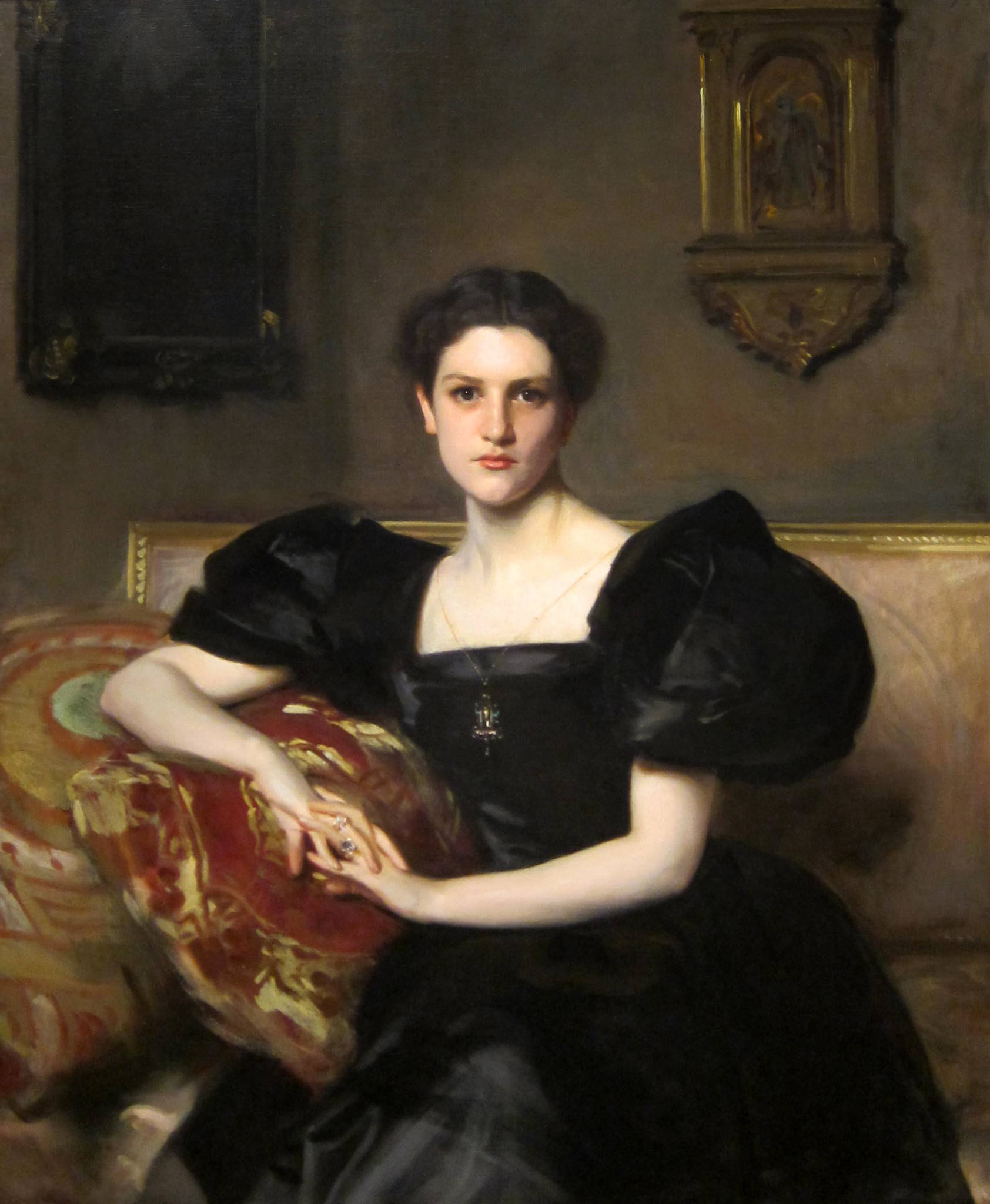
Portrait of Elizabeth Astor Winthrop Chanler, by John Singer Sargent, 1893.

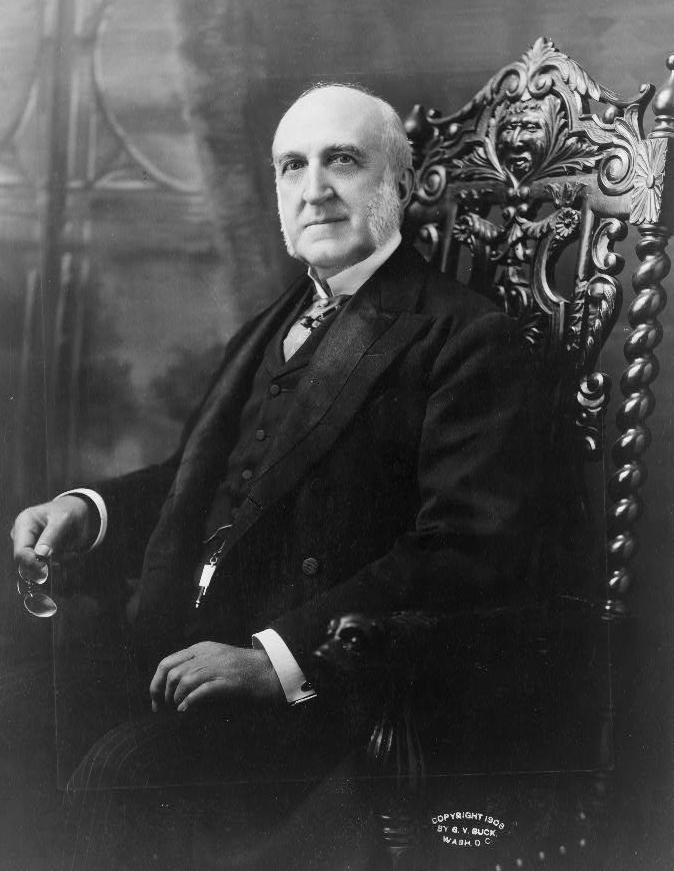
Photograph of Chauncey Depew, U.S. Senator and president of the Vanderbilt's New York Central Railroad, c. 1908.

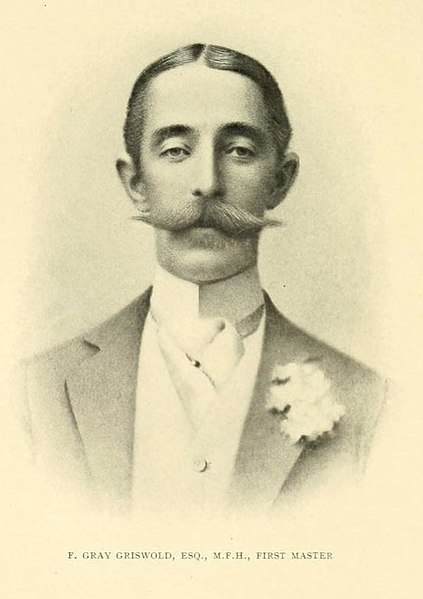
Frank Gray Griswold, financier and writer, 1908.

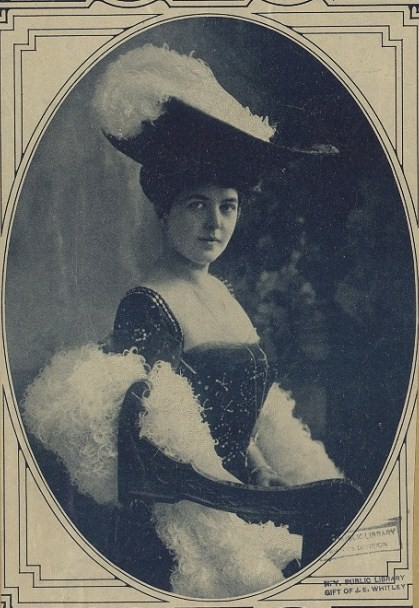
Julia Dent Grant, who married Prince Mikhail Cantacuzène in 1899, was the daughter of Frederick Dent Grant and granddaughter of U.S. President Ulysses S Grant. Photo taken in 1904.

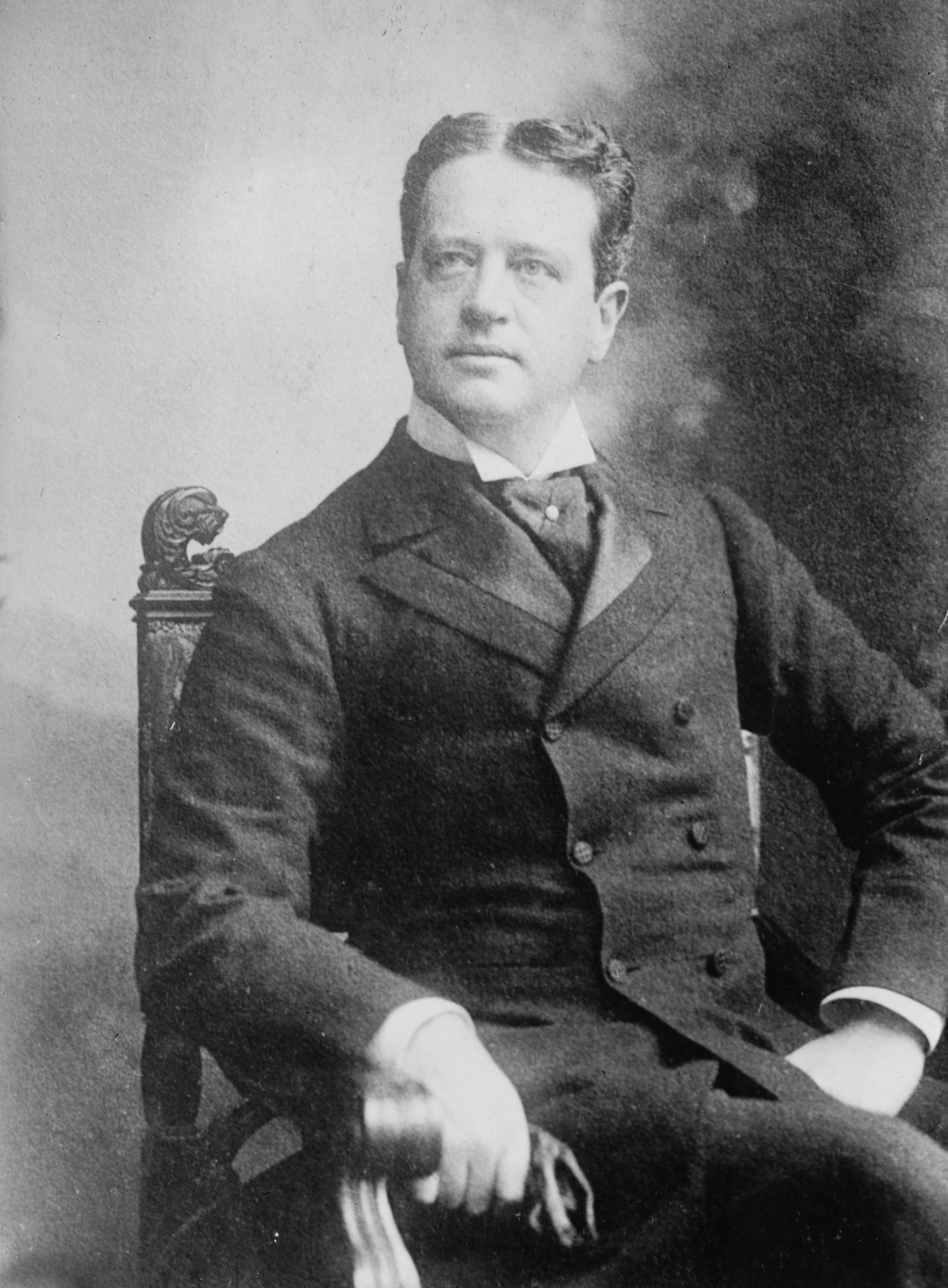
Photograph of William Kissam Vanderbilt, first husband of Alva Smith Vanderbilt.

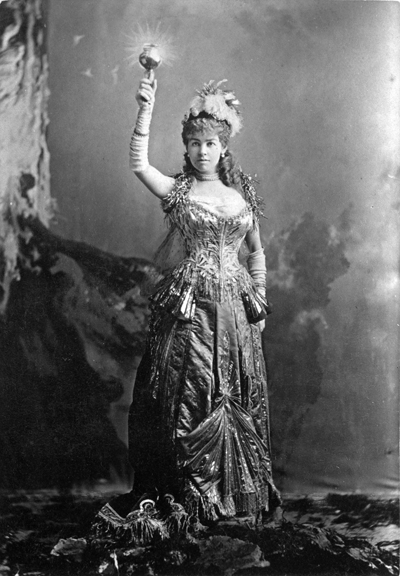
Photograph of Alice Claypoole Vanderbilt, wife of Cornelius Vanderbilt II, at Alva's 1883 Ball as 'Electric Light'. Gown by Charles Frederick Worth. Photographed by José Maria Mora.

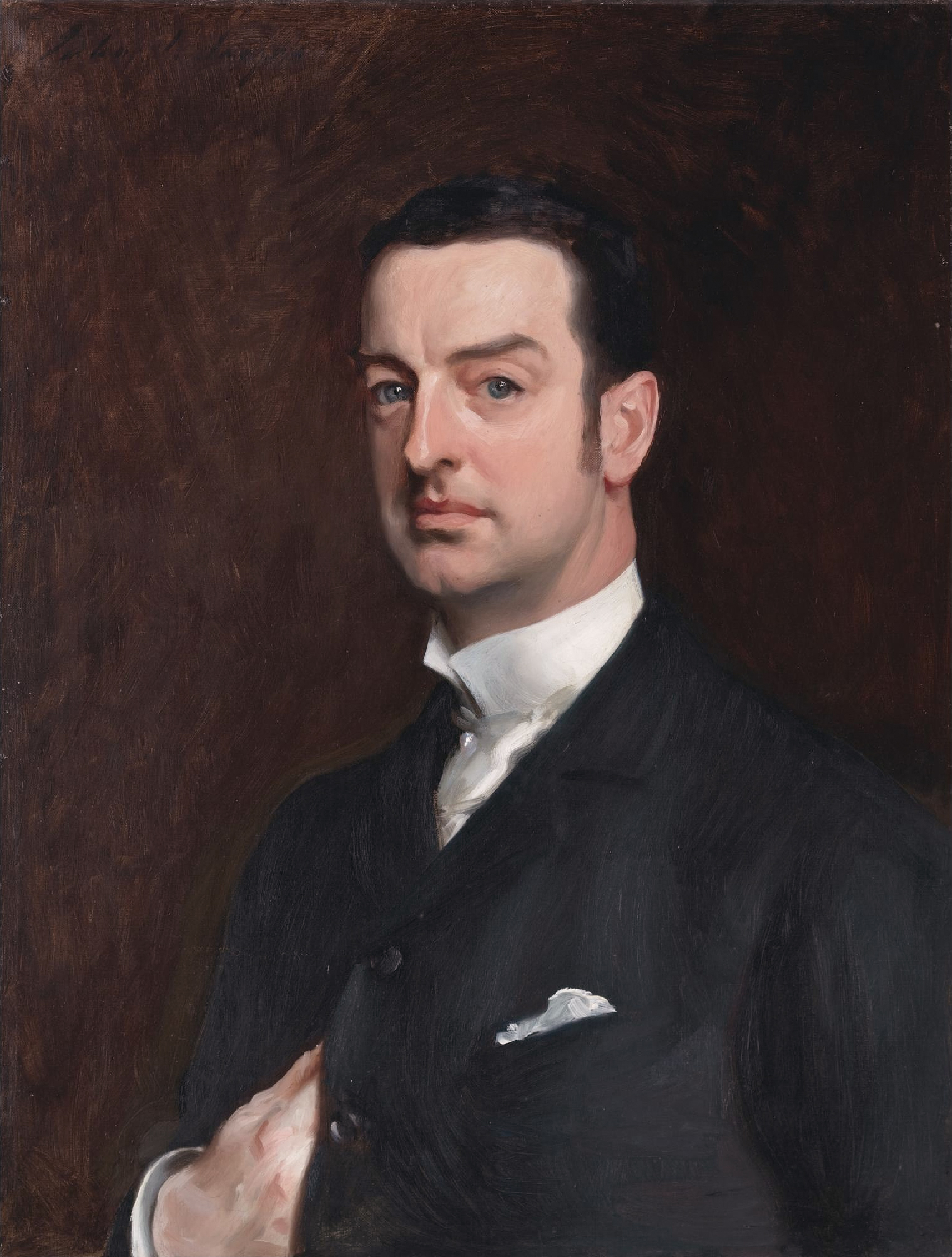
Portrait of Cornelius Vanderbilt II, husband of Alice Claypoole Vanderbilt, by John Singer Sargent, 1890.

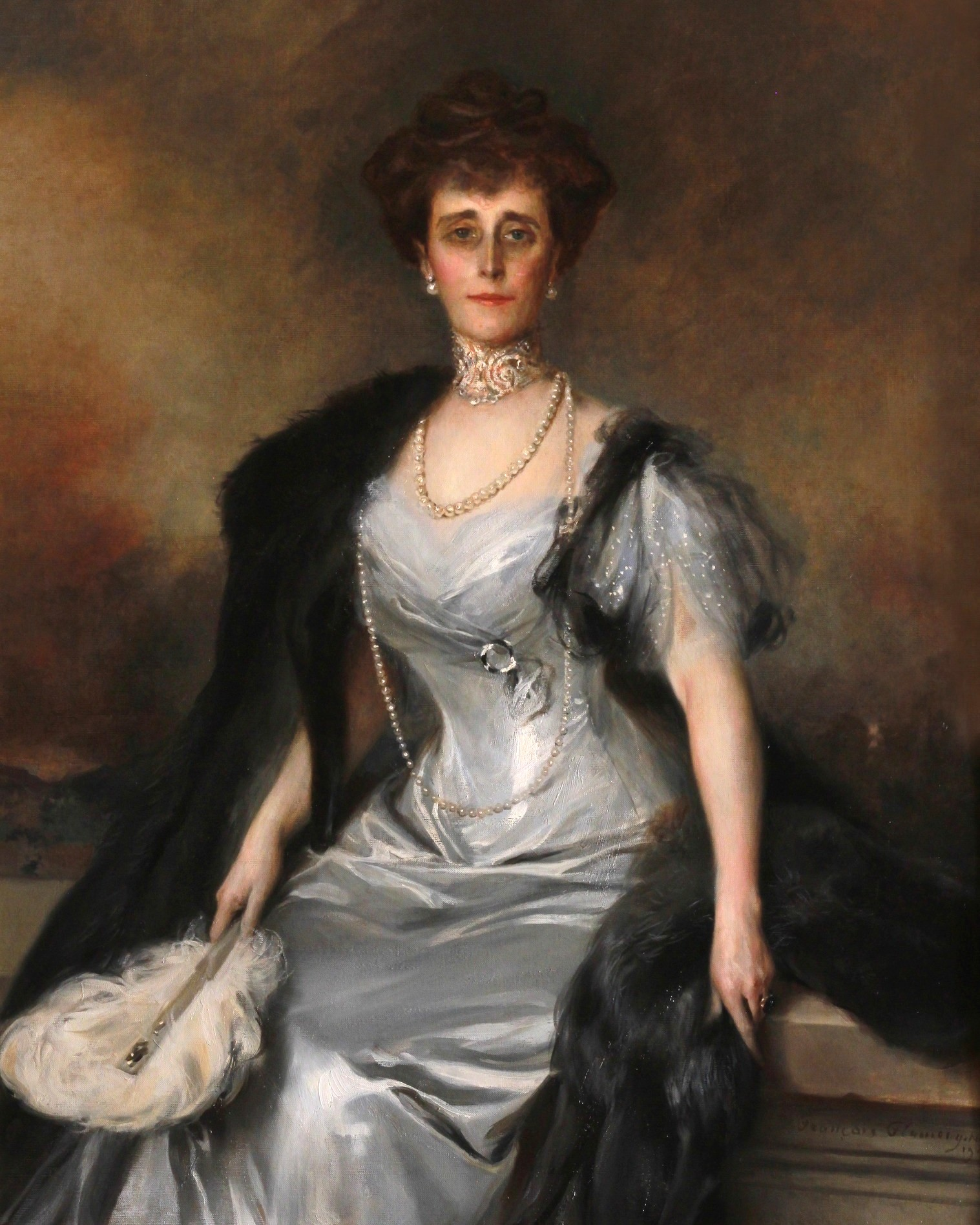
Portrait of Ruth Livingston Mills, wife of Ogden Mills, by Francois Fleming.

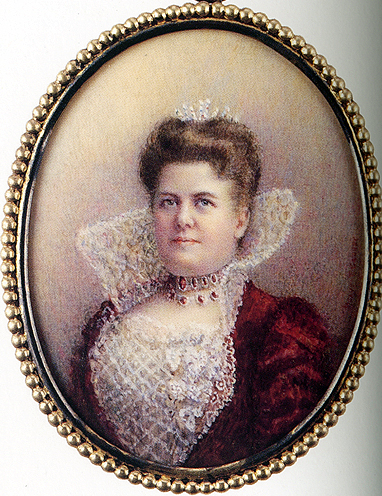
A miniature portrait of Cornelia Sherman Martin, wife of Bradley Martin, who threw the infamous Bradley-Martin Ball in 1897.

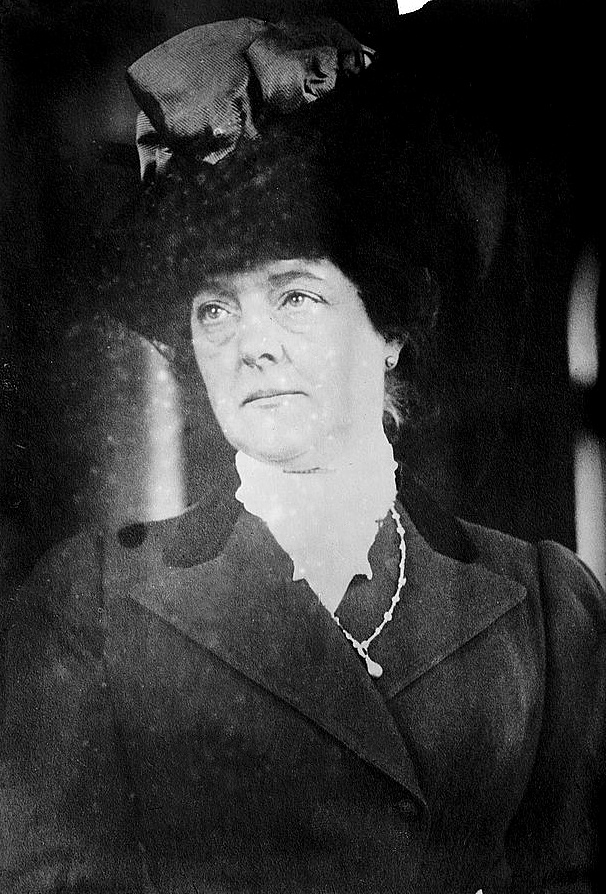
Photograph of Frances Ellen Work, the former wife of James Roche, 3rd Baron Fermoy, c. 1910–1915.

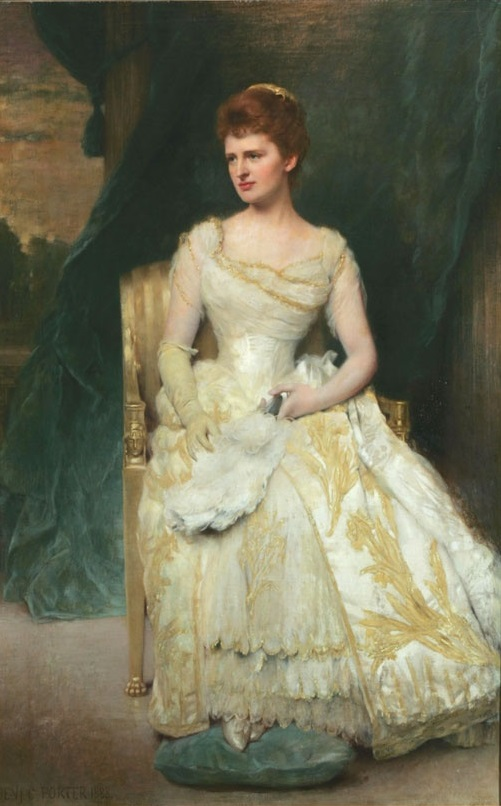
Portrait of Emily Thorn Vanderbilt, wife of businessman William Douglas Sloane, by Benjamin Curtis Porter, 1888.

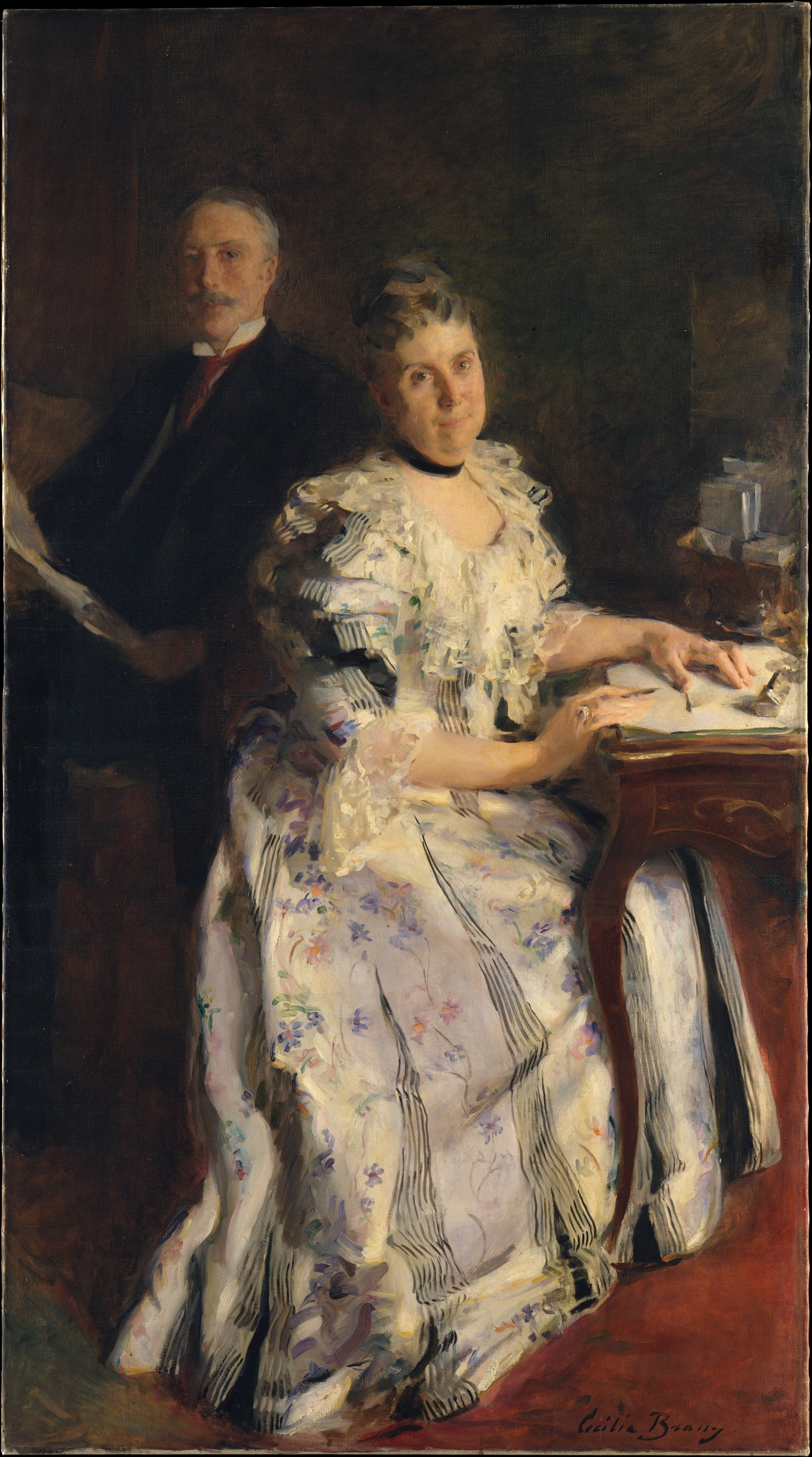
Portrait of Mr. and Mrs. Anson Phelps Stokes, a merchant and banker, by Cecilia Beaux c. 1898.

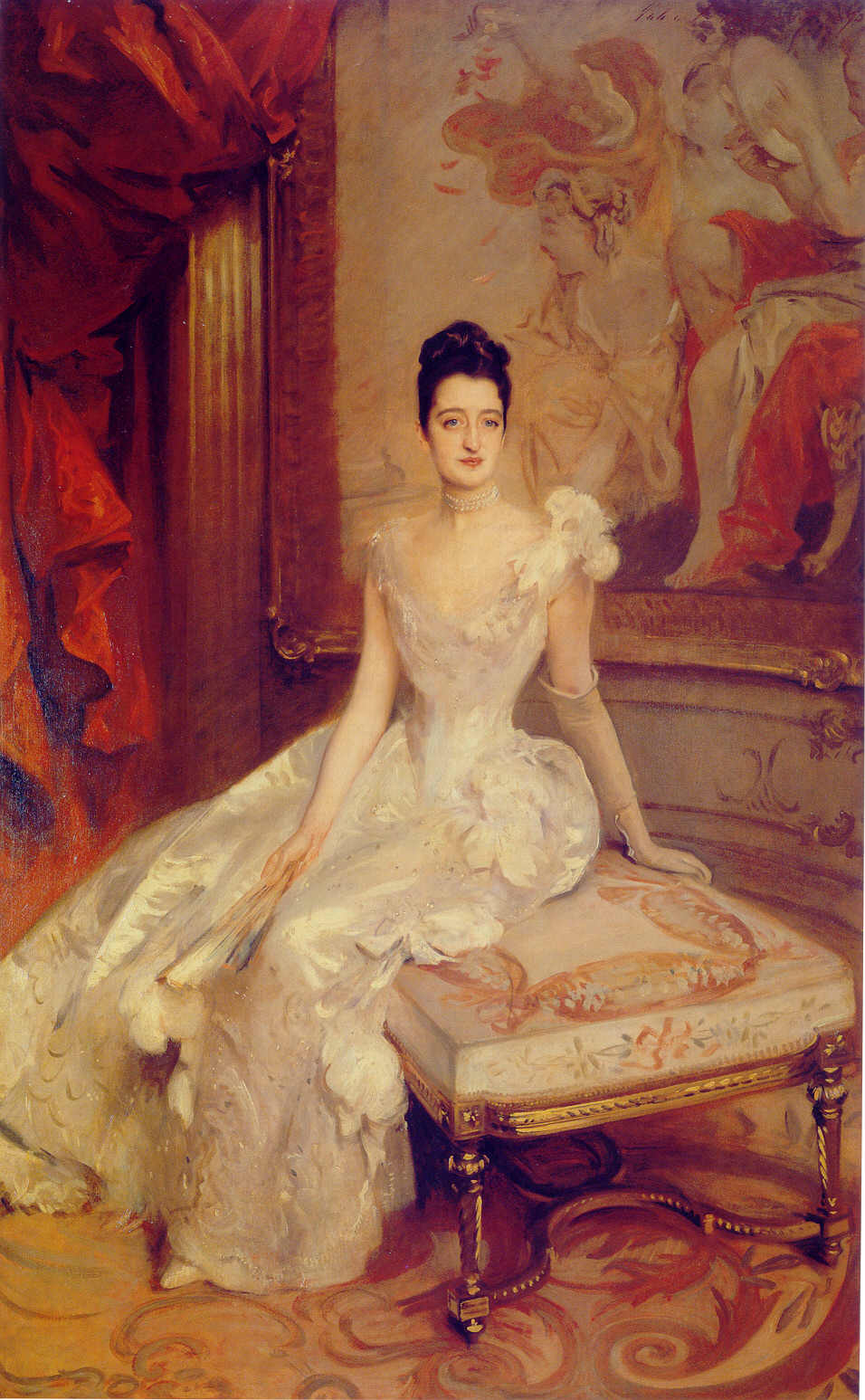
Portrait of Florence Adele Vanderbilt Twombly, wife of Hamilton McKown Twombly, by John Singer Sargent, 1890.

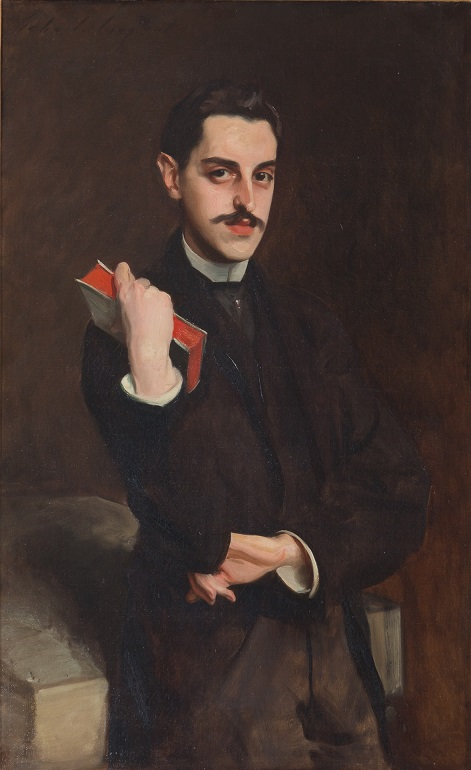
Portrait of George Washington Vanderbilt II, builder of the Biltmore Estate in North Carolina, by John Singer Sargent, 1890.

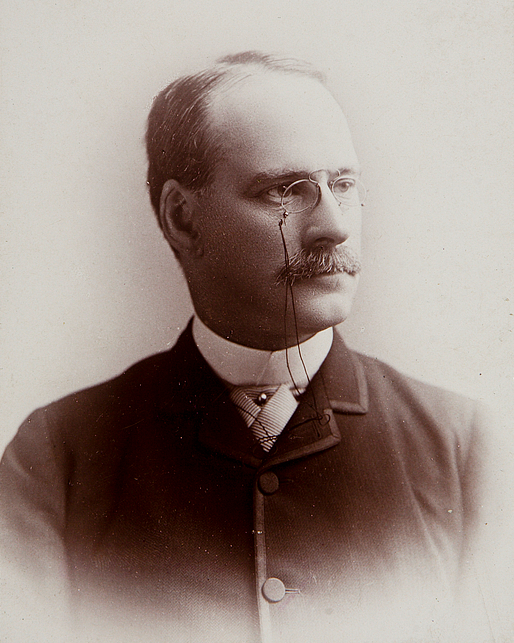
Photograph of William Collins Whitney, former U.S. Secretary of the Navy (during the Cleveland administration), c. 1892 photographed by Charles Milton Bell.

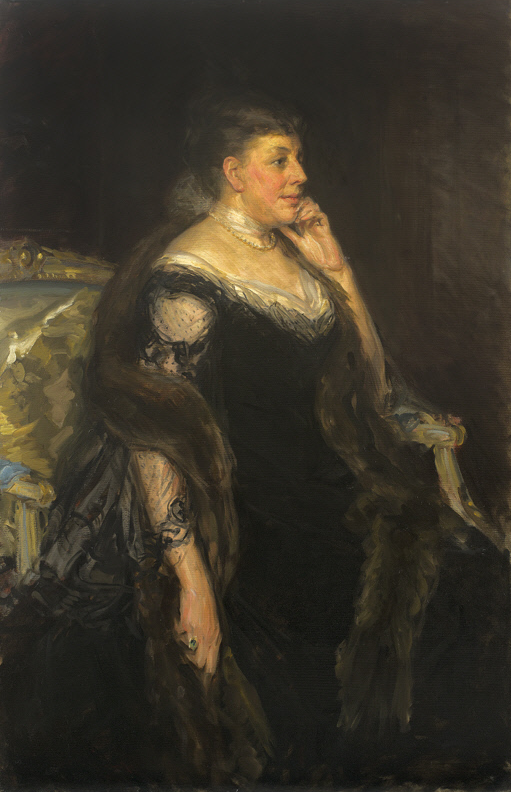
Mrs. Henry Isaac Lorillard Barbey. By Wilhelm Heinrich Funk, 1904.

Besides containing far fewer than 400 people, McAllister's list "abounded in inaccuracies: names were misspelled or incomplete and many spouses omitted or included although they were dead." The rules of the time dictated that "only the eldest unmarried daughter of a family carried the title 'Miss,' with no given name," but he regularly ignored the rule.

| No. | Name as it appears in article | Full name |
|---|---|---|
| 1, 2 | Mr. and Mrs. F. R. Appleton | Francis R. Appleton; Fanny Lanier Appleton |
| 3 | Fred H. Allen | Frederick Hobbes Allen |
| 4, 5 | Mr. and Mrs. Astor | William Backhouse Astor Jr. Caroline Schermerhorn Astor |
| 6, 7 | Mr. and Mrs. J.J. Astor | John Jacob Astor IV (Note: John Jacob Astor IV was Caroline's only son. He and his second wife, Madeleine Astor, were on the maiden voyage of the RMS Titanic. The richest passenger onboard, he died as it sunk on April 15, 1912.); Ava Lowle Willing |
| 8, 9 | Mr. and Mrs. George H. Bend | George H. Bend; Elizabeth Austen Townsend Bend |
| 10 | Miss Amy Bend | Amy Bend |
| 11 | Miss Beatrice Bend | Beatrice Bend |
| 12, 13 | Mr. and Mrs. Lloyd Bryce | Lloyd Bryce; Edith Cooper Bryce |
| 14 | Mrs. Cavendish Bentinck | Elizabeth Livingston Cavendish-Bentinck (Note: Elizabeth Cavendish-Bentinck, a member of the Livingston family, was included, but her husband, MP William George Cavendish-Bentinck was not. William was a grand-nephew of the 4th Duke of Portland and great-grandson of the 3rd Duke of Portland, the Prime Minister of United Kingdom under George III.) |
| 15, 16 | Mr. and Mrs. F. Bronson | Frederic Bronson; Sarah Gracie King Bronson |
| 17 | Heber Bishop | Heber Reginald Bishop |
| 18 | Miss Bishop | Mary Cunningham Bishop |
| 19 | William Harold Brown | William Harold Brown |
| 20, 21 | Mr. and Mrs. Edmund N. Baylies | Edmund L. Baylies; Louisa Van Rensselaer Baylies |
| 22 | Mr. Temple Bowdoin | Temple Bowdoin |
| 23, 24 | Mr. and Mrs. J. Townsend Burden | I. Townsend Burden; Evelyn Byrd Moale Burden |
| 25 | Miss Burden | Evelyn B. Burden |
| 26 | Mrs. Barbey | Mary Lorillard Barbey |
| 27 | Miss Barbey | Eva Barbey |
| 28 | Harold Brown | Harold Brown |
| 29 | Edward Bulkley | Edward H. Bulkeley |
| 30, 31 | Mr. and Mrs. James L. Barclay | James Lent Barclay; Olivia Bell Barclay |
| 32 | C. C. Baldwin | C.C. Baldwin |
| 33 | Miss Baldwin | Louise Roman Baldwin |
| 34 | C. C. Baldwin Jr. | C.C. Baldwin, Jr. |
| 35, 36 | Gen. and Mrs. Henry L. Burnett | Henry Lawrence Burnett; Agnes Suffern Tailer Burnett |
| 37 | Mr. Thomas Cushing | Thomas Forbes Cushing |
| 38 | Miss Edith Cushing | Edith Howard Cushing |
| 39 | Mr. F. Bayard Cutting | Robert Bayard Cutting |
| 40 | Miss Coster | Martha Ellery Coster |
| 41 | Mr. Harry Coster | Harry Coster; Mary Lee Coles Coster |
| 42, 43 | Mr. and Mrs. Charles Carroll | Charles Carroll; Suzanne Bancroft Carroll |
| 44, 45 | Mr. and Mrs. Clarence Cary | Clarence Cary; Elisabeth Miller Potter Cary |
| 46, 47 | Mr. and Mrs. Winthrop Chandler | Winthrop Astor Chanler; Margaret Terry Chanler |
| 48 | Mrs. Brockholst Cutting | Marion Ramsay Cutting |
| 49, 50 | Mr. and Mrs. Harry Cannon | Henry White Cannon; Jennie Curtis Cannon |
| 51 | Robert L. Cutting Jr. | Robert Livingston Cutting Jr. |
| 52 | Col. J. Schuyler Crosby | John Schuyler Crosby |
| 53 | Miss Crosby | Angelica Schuyler Crosby |
| 54, 55 | Mr. and Mrs. W. Bayard Cutting | William Bayard Cutting; Olivia Peyton Murray Cutting |
| 56, 57 | Mr. and Mrs. S. V. R. Cruger | Stephen Van Rensselaer Cruger; Julia Grinnell Storrow Cruger |
| 58 | Rawlings Cottenet | Rawlins Lowndes Cottenet |
| 59 | F. Brockholst Cutting | F. Brockholst Cutting |
| 60 | W. Cutting Jr. | William Bayard Cutting, Jr. |
| 61 | Sir Roderick Cameron | Sir Roderick Cameron |
| 62 | Duncan Cameron | Duncan Ewen Cameron |
| 63, 64 | The Misses Cameron | Catherine Natalie Cameron; Anne Fleming Cameron |
| 65, 66 | Mr. and Mrs. James Cross | Richard James Cross; Annie Redmond Cross |
| 67, 68 | Mr. and Mrs. Edward Cooper | Edward Cooper; Cornelia Redmond Cooper |
| 69, 70, 71 | The Misses Chanler | Elizabeth Astor Winthrop Chanler; Margaret Livingston Chanler; Alida Beekman Chanler |
| 72 | William R. Coster | William B. Coster; Maria Griswold Gray Coster |
| 73, 74 | Mr. and Mrs. Elisha Dyer Jr. | Elisha Dyer III; Sidney Turner Swan Dyer |
| 75, 76 | Mr. and Mrs. Duncan Elliot | Duncan Elliot; Sallie Hargous Elliot |
| 77, 78 | Mr. and Mrs. George B. De Forest | George Beach de Forest Jr. Anita Hargous de Forest |
| 79, 80 | Mr. and Mrs. Chauncey M. Depew | Chauncey Depew; Elise Hegeman Depew |
| 81, 82 | Mr. and Mrs. Frederic de Peyster | Frederic James de Peyster; Augusta McEvers Morris de Peyster |
| 83, 84 | Dr. and Mrs. Francis Delafield | Francis Delafield; Katherine Van Rensselaer Delafield |
| 85 | Miss Delafield | Elizabeth Ray Delafield |
| 86, 87 | Mr. and Mrs. Paul Dana | Paul Dana; Mary Butler Duncan Dana |
| 88 | H. De Courcy Forbes | H. De Courcy Forbes |
| 89, 90 | Mr. and Mrs. Stuyvesant Fish | Stuyvesant Fish; Marion Graves Anthon Fish |
| 91, 92 | Mr. and Mrs. C. G. Francklyn | Charles G. Francklyn; Susan Sprague Hoyt Francklyn |
| 93 | J. C. Furman | John C. Furman |
| 94, 95 | Mr. and Mrs. Hamilton Fish Jr. | Hamilton Fish, Jr. Emily Mann Fish |
| 96 | Theodore Frelinghuysen | Theodore Frelinghuysen |
| 97 | Augustus C. Gurnee | Augustus C. Gurnee |
| 98, 99 | Mr. and Mrs. Ogden Goelet | Ogden Goelet; Mary Wilson Goelet |
| 100 | Mr. Frank G. Griswold | Frank Gray Griswold |
| 101 | Miss Greene | Anne Dunkin Greene |
| 102 | Mr. Allister Greene | Alister Greene |
| 103 | Miss Grant | Julia Grant |
| 104 | Robert F. Hawkes | Robert Forbes Hawkes |
| 105, 106 | Mr. and Mrs. Thomas Howard | Thomas Howard; Rose Post Howard |
| 107, 108 | Mr. and Mrs. Carly Havemeyer | Charles Frederick Havemeyer; Camilla Woodward Moss Havemeyer |
| 109 | Meredith Howland | Meredith Howland |
| 110, 111 | Mr. and Mrs. Valentine G. Hall | Valentine Hall Jr. Mary Livingston Ludlow Hall |
| 112 | Miss Hall | Elizabeth Livingston Hall |
| 113 | John A. Hadden Jr. | John A. Hadden Jr. |
| 114, 115 | Mr. and Mrs. Columbus Iselin | Columbus Iselin; Edith Colford Jones Iselin |
| 116 | Isaac Iselin | Isaac Iselin |
| 117 | Mrs. William Jaffray | Helen Smythe Jaffray |
| 118 | Miss Jaffray | Helen Frances Jaffray |
| 119 | Mrs. F. R. Jones | Mary Cadwalader Rawle Jones |
| 120 | Miss Beatrix Jones | Beatrix Cadwalader Jones |
| 121 | Shipley Jones | Shipley Jones |
| 122, 123 | Mr. and Mrs. DeLancey Kane | DeLancey Astor Kane; Eleanora Iselin Kane |
| 124 | Nicholas Kane | Samuel Nicholson Kane |
| 125 | Miss Knowlton | Mary Knowlton |
| 126 | Miss Sybel Kane | Sybil Kane |
| 127, 128 | Mr. and Mrs. J. P. Kernochan | James Powell Kernochan; Catherine Lorillard Kernochan |
| 129, 130 | Col. and Mrs. Kip | Lawrence Kip; Eva Lorillard Kip |
| 131 | Miss Kipp | Edith Kip |
| 132, 133 | Mr. and Mrs. Frederick Kernochan | J. Frederic Kernochan; Mary Stuart Whitney Kernochan |
| 134 | Miss Lusk | Anna Hartwell Lusk |
| 135 | Arthur Leary | Arthur Leary |
| 136 | Mrs. Maturin Livingston | Ruth Baylies Livingston |
| 137, 138 | Mr. and Mrs. James Lanier | James F. D. Lanier; Harriet Bishop Lanier |
| 139, 140 | Mr. and Mrs. Henry B. Livingston | Henry B. Livingston; Frances Redmond Livingston |
| 141 | Edward Livingston | Edward Livingston |
| 142 | Miss Clarissa Livingston | Clarisse Livingston |
| 143 | Edward De Peyster Livingston | Edward De Peyster Livingston |
| 144, 145 | Mr. and Mrs. Clement C. Moore | Clement Clarke Moore; Laura Williams Moore |
| 146 | Ward McAllister | Ward McAllister |
| 147, 148 | Mr. and Mrs. Charles H. Marshall | Charles Henry Marshall; Josephine Banks Marshall |
| 149 | Clement March | Clement March |
| 150, 151 | Mr. and Mrs. O. Mills | Ogden Mills; Ruth Livingston Mills |
| 152, 153 | Mr. and Mrs. B. Martin | Bradley Martin; Cornelia Sherman Martin |
| 154 | F. T. Martin | Frederick Townsend Martin |
| 155 | Peter Marié | Peter Marié |
| 156, 157 | Mr. and Mrs. H. W. McVickar | Harry Whitney McVickar; Maud Robbins McVickar |
| 158, 159 | Mr. and Mrs. A. N. Morris | Augustus Newbold Morris; Eleanor Colford Jones Morris |
| 160 | Miss Morris | Eva Van Cortlandt Morris |
| 161, 162 | Mr. and Mrs. R. Mortimer | Richard Mortimer; Eleanor Jay Chapman Mortimer |
| 163 | Miss Morgan | Anne Morgan |
| 164, 165 | Mr. and Mrs. T. Newbold | Thomas Newbold; Sarah Lawrence Coolidge Newbold |
| 166 | Mrs. Frederick Nelson | Isabelle Gebhard Neilson |
| 167 | S. H. Olin | Stephen H. Olin |
| 168, 169 | Mr. and Mrs. C. Oelrichs | Charles May Oelrichs; Blanche de Loosey Oelrichs |
| 170 | James Otis | James Otis |
| 171 | Miss Otis | Sarah Birdsall Otis |
| 172 | Edward Post | Edward C. Post |
| 173 | Richard Peters | Richard Peters |
| 174, 175 | Mr. and Mrs. B. C. Porter | Benjamin Curtis Porter; Mary Clark Porter |
| 176, 177 | Mr. and Mrs. Frank Pendelton | Francis Key Pendleton; Elizabeth La Montagne Pendleton |
| 178 | Julian Potter | Julian Potter |
| 179 | I. V. Packer | James Vanderburgh Parker |
| 180, 181 | Mr. and Mrs. H. N. Potter | Howard Nott Potter; Ethel Potter |
| 182, 183 | Gen. and Mrs. Pierson | John Frederick Pierson; Susan Augusta Rhodes Pierson |
| 184 | Miss Pierson | Marguerite Pierson Hull |
| 185, 186 | Mr. and Mrs. George B. Post | George Browne Post; Alice Stone Post |
| 187 | Mrs. William H. Perry | Constance Frink Perry |
| 188 | Miss Perry | Bertha Perry Ronalds |
| 189 | Goold H. Redmond | Goold H. Redmond |
| 190 | Mrs. Rogers | Susan LeRoy Fish Rogers |
| 191 | Miss Rogers | Julia Fish Rogers |
| 192 | J. Ritchie | J. Wadsworth Ritchie |
| 193 | T. J. Oakley Rhinelander | Thomas Jackson Oakley Rhinelander |
| 194 | Miss Cora Randolph | Cora Randolph Trimble |
| 195 | Mrs. Burke Roche | Frances Burke Roche |
| 196, 197 | Mr. and Mrs. S. O. Ripley | Sidney Dillon Ripley; Mary Hyde Ripley |
| 198 | D. T. L. Robinson | Douglas Robinson Sr. |
| 199 | R. K. Richards | Robert Kerr Richards |
| 200, 201 | Mr. and Mrs. Douglas Robinson Jr. | Douglas Robinson Jr. Corinne Roosevelt Robinson |
| 202, 203 | Mr. and Mrs. H. Robins | Henry Asher Robbins; Lizzie Pelham Bend Robbins |
| 204 | Miss Sands | Edith Cruger Sands |
| 205, 206 | Mr. and Mrs. William D. Sloane | William Douglas Sloane; Emily Thorn Vanderbilt Sloane |
| 207, 208 | Mr. and Mrs. Philip Schuyler | Philip Schuyler; Harriet Lowndes Langdon Schuyler |
| 209, 210 | Mr. and Mrs. Byam K. Stevens | Byam K. Stevens; Eliza Langdon Wilks Stevens |
| 211 | Lispenard Stewart | Lispenard Stewart, Jr. |
| 212, 213 | Mr. and Mrs. W. W. Sherman | William Watts Sherman; Sophia Augusta Brown Sherman |
| 214 | Miss Adele Sloane | Florence Adele Sloane |
| 215, 216 | Mr. and Mrs. Anson Phelps Stokes | Anson Phelps Stokes; Helen Phelps Stokes |
| 217 | Miss Stokes | Olivia Egleston Phelps Stokes |
| 218, 219 | Mr. and Mrs. Walter L. Suydam | Walter Lispenard Suydam; Jane Mesier Suydam |
| 220, 221 | Mr. and Mrs. F. K. Sturgis | Frank K. Sturgis; Florence Lydig Sturgis |
| 222 | Miss Elizabeth Stevens | Elizabeth Callendar Stevens |
| 223 | G. Mead Tooker | Gabriel Mead Tooker |
| 224 | Miss Tooker | Charlotte Tooker Warren |
| 225 | E. N. Tailer | Edward Neufville Tailer |
| 226, 227 | Mr. and Mrs. H. McKay Twombly | Hamilton McKown Twombly; Florence Vanderbilt Twombly |
| 228 | Miss Tailer | Fannie Bogert Tailer |
| 229 | Marquise de Talleyrand | Elizabeth de Talleyrand-Périgord |
| 230 | Miss Mabel Van Rensselaer | Mabel Van Rensselaer |
| 231 | Miss Alice Van Rensselaer | Alice Van Rensselaer |
| 232, 233 | Mr. and Mrs. Cornelius Vanderbilt | Cornelius Vanderbilt II; Alice Claypoole Gwynne Vanderbilt |
| 234 | George W. Vanderbilt | George W. Vanderbilt |
| 235 | Mrs. A. Van Rensselaer | Louisa Barnewall Van Rensselaer |
| 236 | James Varnum | James Varnum |
| 237 | Mr. Worthington Whitehouse | Worthington Whitehouse |
| 238, 239 | Mr. and Mrs. W. Seward Webb | William Seward Webb; Eliza Osgood Vanderbilt Webb |
| 240 | Barton Willing | John Rhea Barton Willing |
| 241 | Miss Willing | Susan Ridgway Willing |
| 242, 243 | Gov. and Mrs. Wetmore | George Peabody Wetmore; Edith Keteltas Wetmore |
| 244 | Miss Wetmore | Edith M. Keteltas Wetmore |
| 245 | Egerton Winthrop | Egerton Leigh Winthrop |
| 246 | Thomas C. Winthrop | Thomas C. Winthrop |
| 247 | F. B. Winthrop | Bronson Winthrop |
| 248, 249 | Mr. and Mrs. Buchanan Winthrop | Buchanan Winthrop; Sarah Townsend Winthrop |
| 250 | Miss Winthrop | Marie Austen Winthrop |
| 251, 252 | Mr. and Mrs. Ben. Wells | Benjamin Welles; Frances Wyeth Swan Welles |
| 253, 254 | Mr. and Mrs. W. C. Whitney | William Collins Whitney; Flora Payne Whitney |
| 255 | Miss Georgiana L. Wilmerding | Georgiana L. Wilmerding |
| 256 | Mrs. C. A. Whittier | Elizabeth Chadwick Whittier |
| 257, 258 | Mr. and Mrs. Wysong | John J. Wysong; Martha Marshall Wysong |
| 259 | M. A. Wilkes | Matthew Astor Wilks |
| 260, 261 | Mr. and Mrs. W. Storrs Wells | William Storrs Wells; Anna Cole Raynor Wells |
| 262, 263 | Gen. and Mrs. Alexander S. Webb | Alexander S. Webb; Anna Remsen Webb |
| 264 | Miss Carrie Webb | Caroline LeRoy Webb |
| 265 | Alexander S. Webb | Alexander Stewart Webb |

== See also ==
- Bradley-Martin Ball
- List of Gilded Age mansions
- Lee Shelton's "Four Hundred Club" of St. Louis, Missouri
- The Social Register, a directory of socialites started in the 1880s
