= Edward H. Bulkeley =

American clubman

- Born: 1869
- Died: 8 January 1908 (aged 38–39); Newport, Rhode Island, U.S.
- Spouse: Margaret Stewart
- Children: 1

Edward Henry Bulkeley (c. 1869 – January 8, 1908) was an American clubman who was prominent in New York society during the Gilded Age.

== Early life ==
Bulkeley was born circa 1869. He was the son of Edward Henry Bulkeley (b. 1828), a Wall Street operator, and Catherine Wolfe (née Clark) Bulkeley. His three sisters included Helen C. Bulkeley, who married Roland Redmond, Mary Caroline Bulkeley (b. 1850), who married Reginald William Rives (the brother of Assistant Secretary of State George L. Rives, grandson of U.S. Senator William Cabell Rives, and cousin of author Amélie Rives), and Katherine Bulkeley (b. 1860), who married Prescott Lawrence.

His paternal grandparents were Charles Bulkeley (1774–1843) and his third wife, Chloe (née Beebe) Bulkeley (1791–1845).

== Society life ==
In 1892, Bulkeley was included in Ward McAllister's "Four Hundred," purported to be an index of New York's best families, published in The New York Times. Conveniently, 400 was the number of people that could fit into Mrs. Astor's ballroom. He was also a prominent member of the Knickerbocker Club.

Around 1896, Bulkeley organized the famous Bachelor's Ball, "which was one of the most successful entertainments of its kind ever given in New York." In 1902, along with Robert Livingston Beeckman, and his new wife, Eleanor Thomas Beeckman, he accompanied them on their trip around the world.

Bulkeley had a cottage in Newport, Rhode Island as well as a bungalow at Hot Springs in Virginia.

== Personal life ==
On November 28, 1906, Bulkeley, who was 37, was married to 23 year old Miss Margaret Stewart in Newport, Rhode Island. Stewart, who was from St. Johns, New Brunswick, was his former nurse during a long illness he suffered the year prior in Newport. Together, they were the parents of:

- Edward Henry Bulkeley (b. 1907)

Bulkeley became gravely ill shortly after his son's birth. He died in Newport on January 8, 1908. After his death, his widow remarried in 1911 to Matthew Buchanan of Glasgow, Scotland.
