= Georgiana Wilmerding Phelps =

American socialite (1873–1960)

- Born: Georgiana Wilmerding; February 4, 1873; New York City, New York, U.S.
- Died: December 31, 1960 (aged 87); New York City, New York, U.S.
- Spouse: Ansel Phelps (m. 1905; died 1950)
- Parent(s): John Christoper Wilmerding; Georgiana L. Heckscher

Georgiana Wilmerding Phelps (January 4, 1873 – December 31, 1960) was an American socialite who was prominent in New York society during the Gilded Age.

== Early life ==
Georgiana, who was known as "Miss Georgie", was born in New York City on January 4, 1873. She was the daughter of John Christoper Wilmerding (1829–1903) and Georgiana L. (née Heckscher) Wilmerding (1845–1926). Her siblings included Edward Coster Wilmerding and John C. Wilmerding, who married Mary Fatimeh de Lex Allen, a great-granddaughter of Cornelius Vanderbilt. Her father John, a merchant, was a member of the dry goods auction firm of Wilmerding, Morris & Mitchell.

She was descended from many of New York's oldest families. Her paternal grandparents were William Edward Wilmerding and Joanna Mary (née Gosman) Wilmerding. Her maternal grandparents were Charles August Heckscher and Georgiana Louisa (née Coster) Heckscher. Her maternal aunt, Matilda Coster Heckscher was married to Stephen Van Rensselaer (son of Brig. Gen. Henry Bell Van Rensselaer and Elizabeth Ray King), her uncle John Gerard Heckscher, was married to Cornelia Lawrence Whitney of the Whitney family and Mary Travers (daughter of William R. Travers). Among her many first cousins was Philip Meiser Lydig, who married Rita de Alba de Acosta; Georgiana Louisa Heckscher, who married New York City Mayor George B. McClellan Jr. (son of Gen. George B. McClellan); Emeline Dora Heckscher, who married Egerton Leigh Winthrop Jr. (son of Egerton Leigh Winthrop); Charles Augustus Van Rensselaer, who married Caroline FitzGerald; Elizabeth Ray Van Rensselaer, who married John Magee Ellsworth; Stephen Van Rensselaer, who married Marian Watson Farlin; and Mathilde Van Rensselaer, who married George Curtis White Jr.

=== Society life ===
Georgiana made her debut in 1888 alongside her cousin Elizabeth Ray Van Rensselaer, Elizabeth Marshall Morris (daughter of Dr. Stuyvesant Fish Morris), and Amy Bend (daughter of George H. Bend), among other prominent ladies. She lived at "Beau Sejour" in Orange, New Jersey.

In 1892, the then unmarried Georgiana was included in Ward McAllister's "Four Hundred", purported to be an index of New York's best families, published in The New York Times. Conveniently, 400 was the number of people that could fit into Mrs. Astor's ballroom.

Georgiana was a director of the Theodore Roosevelt Memorial Association and a member of the Hudson Guild.

== Personal life ==
On June 1, 1905, Georgiana was married to Ansel Stowe Phelps (1872–1950). There was no reception following the wedding as the bride's family was in mourning. The guests at the wedding included New York City Mayor George B. McClellan Jr., and members of the Van Rensselaer, Hecksher, Wilmerding, Coster, Winthrop, Berriman, Morris, Cadwalader families, all relatives of the bride and groom. Phelps was the son of Charles Phelps, also a dry goods merchant, and Helen Minerva (née Stowe) Phelps and the brother of architect Stowe Phelps. Ansel, an 1894 graduate of Yale University, served during the Spanish–American War and was a member of the New York Stock Exchange with the firm of Phelps & McKee. They lived in New York City at 37 East 64th Street and had a home in Oyster Bay, New York near Seawanhaka Corinthian Yacht Club. The Phelps did not have any children.

She died on December 31, 1960, in New York City. Following a service at St. James Episcopal Church on Madison Avenue, she was buried alongside her husband at Green-Wood Cemetery in Brooklyn, New York.
