= Cora Randolph Trimble =

American socialite

- Born: May 29, 1871; Mount St. Vincent, New York, U.S.
- Died: December 31, 1946 (aged 75); New York City, New York, U.S.
- Occupation: Socialite
- Spouse: Richard Trimble (m. 1900; died 1924)
- Parent(s): Edmund Dutilh Fitz Randolph; Helen Earle Lothrop Randolph
- Relatives: Wallace F. Randolph (uncle)

Cora Randolph Trimble (May 29, 1871 – December 31, 1946) was an American socialite during the Gilded Age.

== Early life ==
Cora was born on May 29, 1871, and grew up at Brookwood, the family home in Mount St. Vincent on the Hudson River. She was the daughter of Edmund Dutilh Fitz Randolph, a banker and insurance executive, and Helen Earle (née Lothrop) Randolph. Among her siblings was Mary Welsh Randolph, who married Francis Egerton Webb, brother-in-law of Eliza Osgood Vanderbilt Webb and the son of Ambassador James Watson Webb.

She was descended from the Fitz Randolph family that settled in Cape Cod in the early part of the 17th century. Her paternal grandparents were Dr. Charles Fitz and Margaret (née Gooch) Randolph and her uncle was Wallace F. Randolph, a United States Army major general who became the first U.S. Army Chief of Artillery.

== Society life ==
In 1892, Cora, who was then unmarried, was included in Ward McAllister's "Four Hundred", purported to be an index of New York's best families, published in The New York Times. Conveniently, 400 was the number of people that could fit into Mrs. Astor's ballroom.

She was a charter member of the Colony Club, a member of the Huguenot Society, The Mayflower Society, and the Colonial Dames of America.

== Personal life ==
On February 14, 1900, Cora was married to Richard Trimble (1853–1924), by the Rev. Dr. Morgan Dix of Trinity Church. Trimble was associated with J.P. Morgan & Co. in the formation of the United States Steel Corporation, later serving as its secretary and treasurer. Together, they were the parents of one son and two daughters:

- Richard Trimble Jr. (d. 1941), who was captain of the 1926 crew team at Harvard College. He married Winifred Loew.
- Margaret Randolph Trimble (1901–1968), who married Count Giovanni Revedin (1904–1990), the Italian diplomatic representative to Gen. Douglas MacArthur, in 1939.
- Mary Trimble, who married Perry R. Pease, a member of the Jockey Club who sat on the executive committee of the Turf and Field Club.

Cora died at her home, 1020 Madison Avenue in New York City, on December 31, 1946. She was buried at the Westbury Friends Cemetery in Westbury, New York.
