= Bertha Perry Ronalds =

American philanthropist and socialite (1874–1963)

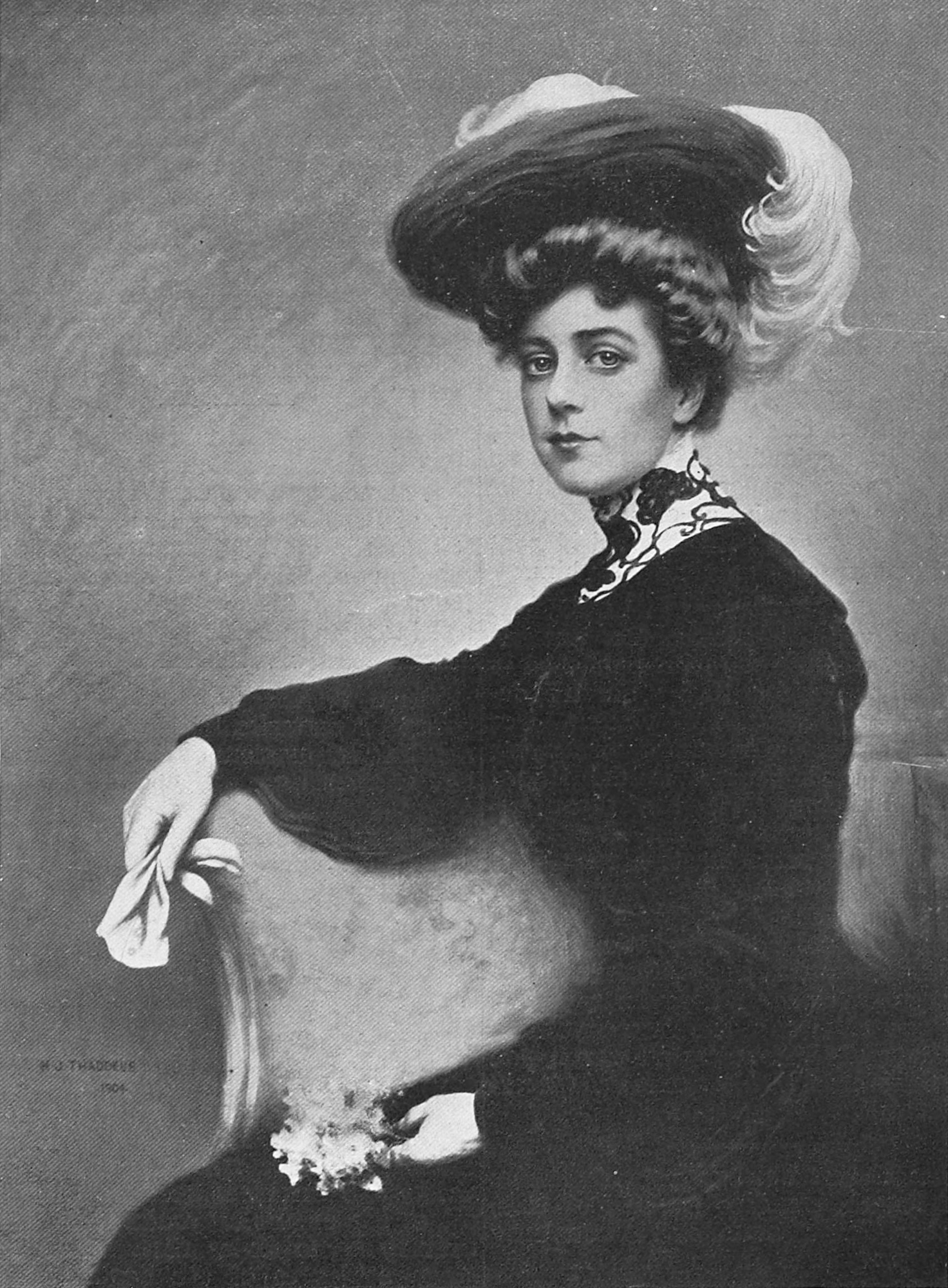
- Born: Bertha Constance Perry; November 27, 1874; Brooklyn, New York, U.S.
- Died: February 3, 1963 (aged 88); San Mateo, California, U.S.
- Spouse: Pierre Lorillard Ronalds Jr. (m. 1895; died 1928)
- Parent(s): William Alfred Perry; Emma Constance Frink
- Relatives: William Haggin Perry (nephew); Fanny Ronalds (mother-in-law)

Bertha Constance Perry Ronalds (November 27, 1874 – February 3, 1963) was an American philanthropist and socialite during the Gilded Age.

== Early life ==
Bertha was born in Brooklyn, New York on November 27, 1874. She was the daughter of William Alfred Perry (1835–1916) and Emma Constance (née Frink) Perry (born 1848). Her brother was Henry Pierrepont Perry, who lived in the Bahamas and was married three times. His first marriage was to Edith Lounsberry (granddaughter of James Ben Ali Haggin), with whom he had William Haggin Perry, after their divorce, he married for the second time to Mary Ridgeley Sands, the former wife of Lorillard S. Spencer, and following her death, he married thirdly to Brenda Williams-Taylor, the daughter of Sir Frederick Williams-Taylor and mother of debutante Brenda Frazier.

Her father, a graduate of Columbia College who was associated with the manufacture of steam pumps, was the son of Joseph Alfred Perry and Emily Constable (née Pierrepont) Perry (the daughter of Hezekiah Pierrepont). Through her father, she was a descendant of Commodore Oliver Hazard Perry, known as the hero of the Battle of Lake Erie in the War of 1812. Her maternal grandparents were Samuel Edgar Frink and Emma Virginia (née Wood) Frink.

== Society life ==
In 1892, Bertha and her widowed mother were included in Ward McAllister's "Four Hundred", purported to be an index of New York's best families, published in The New York Times. Conveniently, 400 was the number of people that could fit into Mrs. Astor's ballroom. She was also a member of the Daughters of the American Revolution.

In December 1896, social arbiter Harry Lehr wrote in his diary that he "lunched with Bertha and Larry Ronalds, who is still boasting of being natural son of Napoleon III." Her husband's parents had separated and her mother-in-law Fanny, was known for her association with Empress Eugénie, Queen Victoria and Queen Alexandra. and many affairs with prominent men, including Leonard Jerome (Winston Churchill's grandfather) and the composer Arthur Sullivan. In Paris, where they lived for many years, the Ronalds were social acquaintances of Henry Adams, who in a 1908 letter to Elizabeth Cameron, referred to Bertha as "the rattling little nez-retroussé type of latent ambition and self-conscious self-distrust under self-assertion."

=== Philanthropy and work ===
Ronalds was a noted, although often anonymous, benefactress to many charities, including the San Mateo Home for Retarded Children and Adults.

== Personal life ==
On June 26, 1895, Bertha was married to Pierre Lorillard Ronalds Jr. (1864–1928) at Ridgelawn in Bay Ridge on Long Island. Her bridesmaids were Mamie Field and Juliana Cutting and his ushers were James F. D. Lanier, Whitney Warren, H. Whitney McVickar, Eliot Gregory, J. Wadsworth Ritchie, F. L. Holbrook Betts, H. Pierrepont Perry and Herbert D. Robins. Ronalds, a hardware fixtures manufacturer with Ronalds & Johnson who was the son of Pierre Ronalds Sr. and Fanny Ronalds, and great-grandson of tobacco magnate Pierre Lorillard II.

Her husband died in February 1928, leaving an estate worth more than $1,000,000, the bulk of which she inherited. After returning from living in Paris, Ronalds owned a ranch in Oregon where she raised Tennessee walking horses, Arabians and Shetland ponies (and which was turned into a Guest ranch known as "Metolius Meadows") and then lived in San Mateo, California for twenty-six years at 40 Crystal Springs Road. She died there at her home on February 3, 1963. Ronalds was interred at Cypress Lawn Memorial Park in Colma, California after a funeral that was officiated by the Rev. Leslie Wilder of the Episcopal Church of St. Matthew.
