= Union Club of the City of New York =

Social club in New York City

- Formation: 1836
- Type: Private social club
- Location(s): 101 East 69th Street New York, New York
- Coordinates: 40.7691°N 73.9647°W
- Website: www.theunionclub.com

The Union Club of the City of New York (commonly known as the Union Club) is a private social club on the Upper East Side of Manhattan in New York City that was founded in 1836. The clubhouse is located at 101 East 69th Street on the corner of Park Avenue. Designed by Delano & Aldrich, the current clubhouse opened on August 28, 1933.

The Union Club is the oldest private club in New York City, the second oldest "city club" in the United States, after the Philadelphia Club, and is the fifth oldest "private club" in the United States, after the South River Club in Annapolis, Maryland (between 1700 and 1732), the Schuylkill Fishing Company in Andalusia, Pennsylvania (1732), the Old Colony Club in Plymouth, Massachusetts (1769), and the Philadelphia Club in Philadelphia, Pennsylvania (1834). The Union Club is considered one of the most prestigious clubs in New York City.

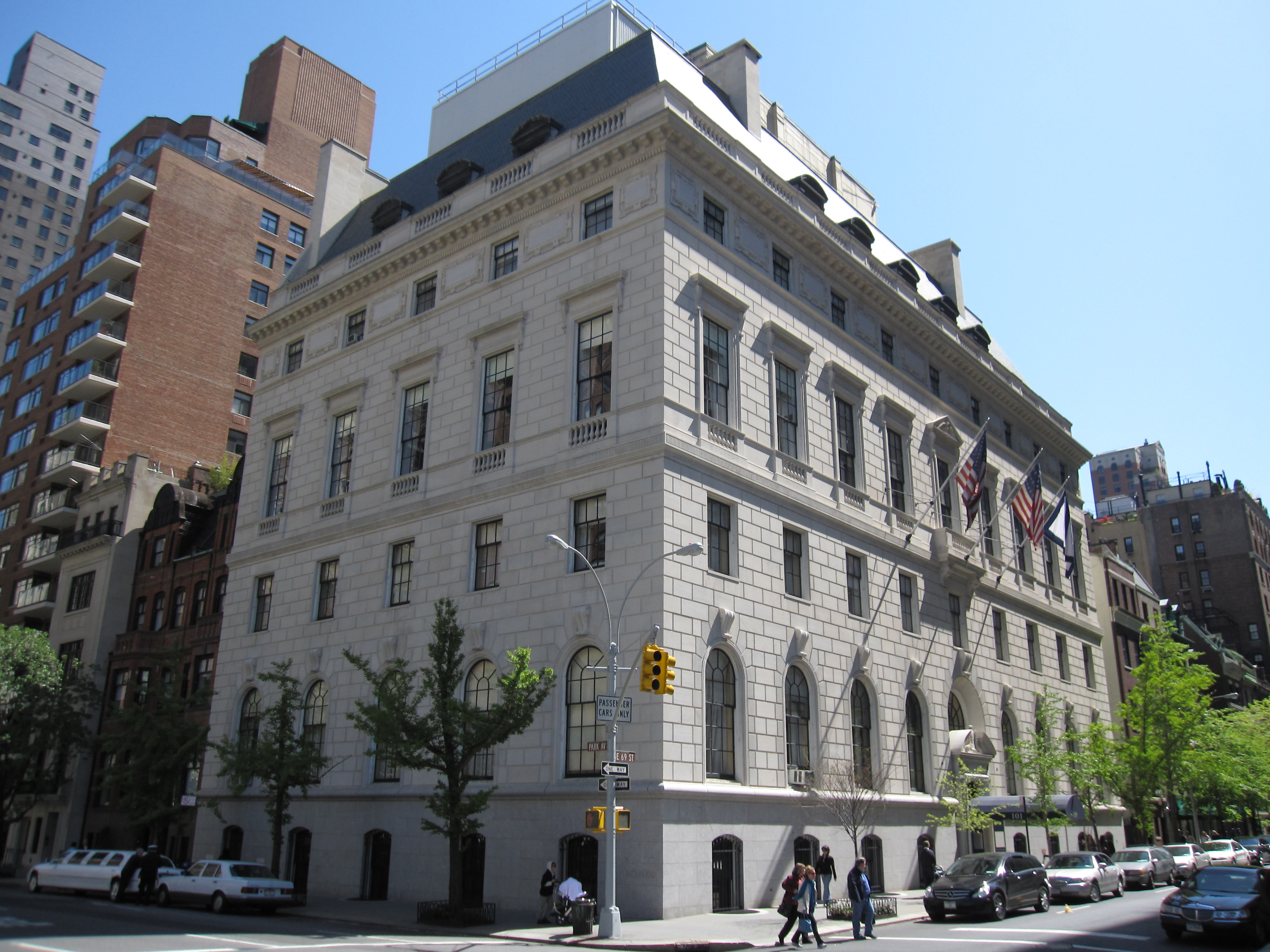
Clubhouse at 101 East 69th Street

== Clubhouse ==
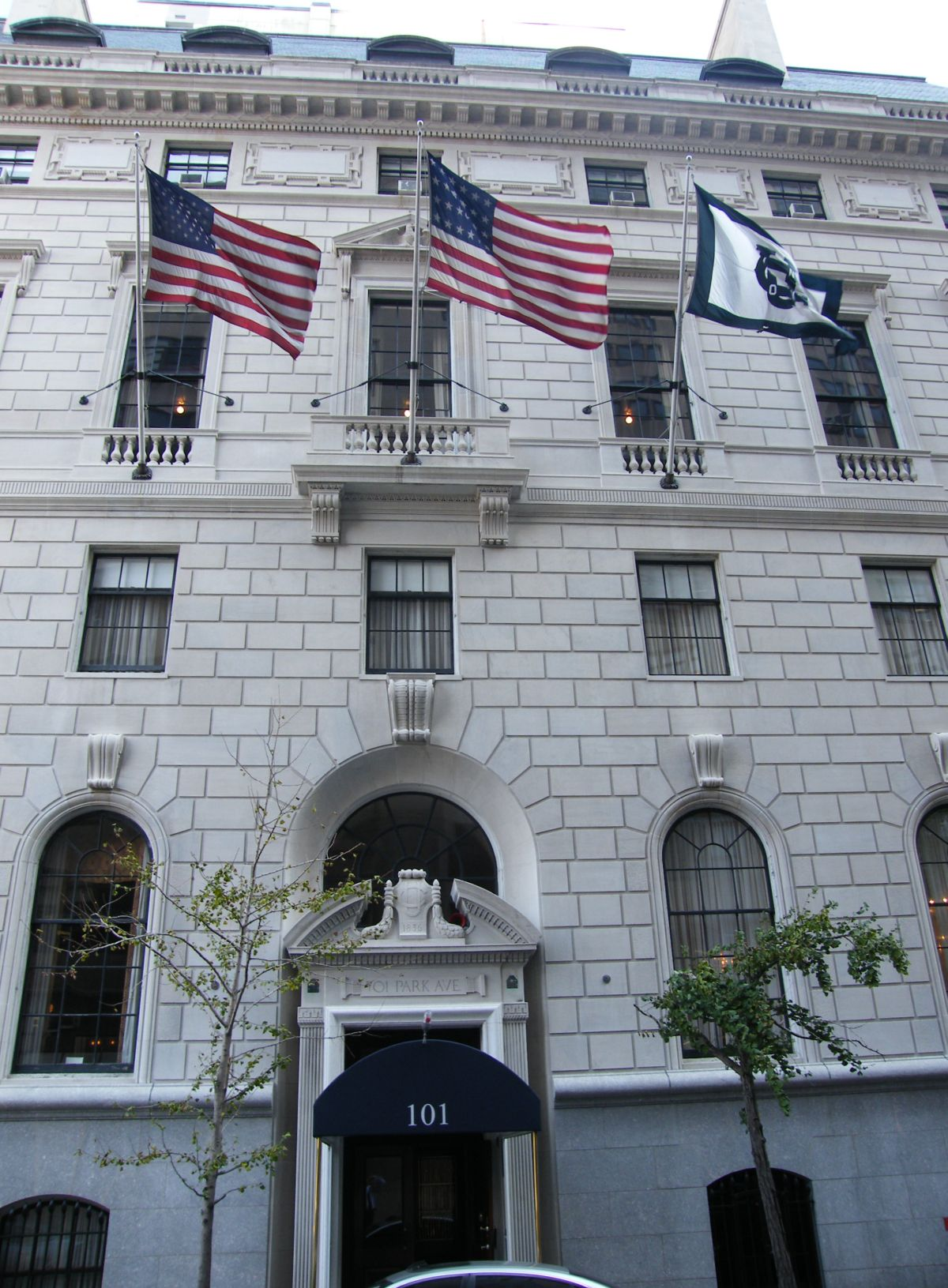
The club's main entrance

The current building is the club's sixth clubhouse and the third built specifically for the members. The prior two clubhouses were at Fifth Avenue and 21st Street, occupied from 1855 to 1903; and on the northeast corner of Fifth Avenue and 51st Street, a limestone clubhouse occupied from 1903 to 1933.

In 1927, club members voted to move uptown, to a quieter and less crowded location. They hired architects William Adams Delano and Chester Holmes Aldrich—who had previously designed buildings for the Knickerbocker Club, the Brook Club, and the Colony Club—to design their new clubhouse. The Union moved to its current location in 1933. The building is known for its opulence and idiosyncratic details. At one point the building featured five dining rooms and a humidor with 100,000 cigars. Notable rooms include the card room, the backgammon room, the library, and the lounge (off the squash courts).

== History ==
The Union Club was founded in 1836 at a meeting held at the home of John McCrackan at 1 Bond Street, and was considered "the most thoroughly aristocratic private institution in the city." The Union Club has been referred to as the "Mother of Clubs" because it was from the Union Club and its membership that many other private clubs in New York and elsewhere have sprung. From the beginning, the Union Club was known for its strongly conservative principles. During the Civil War, the club refused to expel its Confederate members, despite taking a strong line on suppressing anti-draft riots. This policy led some members of the Union to leave and form the Union League Club of New York.

In 1891, the Metropolitan Club was founded by J.P. Morgan as a direct answer to the Union Club, after many of Morgan's friends were denied entry to the Union Club. The Knickerbocker Club was founded by members of the Union who thought the membership standards had fallen.

In 1903, The Brook was founded by some prominent members of the Union Club (as well as some members of other New York City private clubs, such as the Knickerbocker Club and Metropolitan Club).

In 1918, the Union began using women waitresses to free male employees for service related to World War I. This was the first time women were officially allowed entrance to the previously male-only enclave.

In 1932, the Union Club boasted 1,300 members. By the 1950s, urban social club membership was dwindling, in large part because of the movement of wealthy families to the suburbs. In 1954, Union Club membership had declined to 950 members. In 1959, the Union Club and the Knickerbocker Club considered merging the Union's 900 men with The Knick's 550 members, but the plan never came to fruition.

The Union Club is one of the few places where the game of bottle pool is still popular.

== In popular culture ==
- In the 1988 film Working Girl, Tess (Melanie Griffith) and Jack (Harrison Ford) gatecrash the wedding of Oren Trask's (Philip Bosco) daughter at the Union Club, where they pitch their plan to Trask.
- In Season 3, Episode 8 (2012) of HBO's series Boardwalk Empire, titled "The Pony", Nucky Thompson poses as a member of the Kansas City Club to gain access to the Union Club via "a reciprocal agreement" between the two clubs. He then proposes a partnership to Andrew Mellon against Harry Daugherty.
- In Season 3, Episode 6 of The Gilded Age, George Russell is said to be staying at the Union Club. Oscar van Rhijn and John Adams also meet at the Union Club toward the end of the episode.

== Notable members ==
- Joseph Parrish Thompson (1819-1879), American abolitionist and Congregationalist minister. Founder of The Independent, an anti-slavery religious weekly started in 1848, manager of The New Englander (later re-named the Yale Review), president of the American Union Commission, member of the committee to create the New York Metropolitan Museum of Art, gave the eulogy at President Lincoln's funeral and at the Union Club and assisted the Treaty of Berlin with the religious liberty clause. Mary Todd Lincoln gave Rev. Parrish President Lincoln's famous cane after his assassination.
- John Jacob Astor IV (1864–1912), millionaire and RMS Titanic victim
- James Gordon Bennett Jr. (1841–1918), publisher of the New York Herald, bon vivant and eponym of the British exclamation "Gordon Bennett!"
- Anthony Joseph Drexel Biddle Jr. (1897–1961), major general in the U.S. Army and U.S. diplomat
- William A. Chanler (1867–1934), explorer, soldier and US Congressman
- Winston Churchill (1871–1947), novelist
- Edward Cooper (1824–1905), mayor of New York City
- Frank Crowninshield (1872–1947), journalist and art and theatre critic
- William Bayard Cutting (1850–1912), attorney, financier, real estate developer, sugar beet refiner and philanthropist
- Dwight D. Eisenhower (1890–1969), thirty-fourth President of the United States
- John Ericsson (1803–1899), inventor and mechanical engineer who designed the USS Monitor
- William M. Evarts (1818–1901), lawyer, US Secretary of State, US Attorney General and US Senator
- Cyrus West Field (1819–1892), businessman and financier who led the Atlantic Telegraph Company
- Luis de Florez (1889–1962), Rear Admiral in the United States Navy and aerospace pioneer
- Peter Frelinghuysen Jr., member of the U.S. House of Representatives
- Archibald Gracie IV (1858-1912), American writer, soldier, amateur historian, real estate investor, and survivor of the sinking of the Titanic.
- Ulysses S. Grant (1822–1885), eighteenth President of the United States
- Ulysses S. Grant III (1881–1968), major general in the U.S. Army
- Andrew Haswell Green (1820–1903), lawyer and city planner
- Moses H. Grinnell (1803–1877), shipper and Central Park commissioner during its design and construction
- Pierpont M. Hamilton (1898–1982), general in the U.S. Army and U.S. Air Force and recipient of the Medal of Honor
- E. H. Harriman (1848–1909), railroad magnate
- Adolphe Meyer Chief of the Union Club, writer, President of the philharmonic association of Philadelphia
- W. Averell Harriman (1891–1986), politician, businessman and diplomat
- William Randolph Hearst (1863–1951), newspaper magnate, proprietor of Hearst Castle
- Philip Hone (1780–1851), mayor of New York City and 19th century diarist
- Hugh Alwyn Inness-Brown Sr. (1892–1972), New York publisher and journalist
- J. Bruce Ismay (1862–1937), managing director of the White Star Line and RMS Titanic survivor
- Leonard Jerome (1817–1891), financier and grandfather of Winston Churchill
- Hallett Johnson (1888–1968), diplomat and ambassador to Costa Rica
- Philip Kearny (1815–1862), major general in the United States Army, notable for his leadership in the Mexican–American War and American Civil War
- John Alsop King (1788–1867), governor of New York
- Frederck DeCourcy May [1851-1914], New York Socialite and yachtsman. Became a member January 9, 1889. Reported in his obituaries that he fought a duel in Arizona with James Gordon Bennett who had been engaged to Frederick sister Caroline May. {In fact Bennet had been horsewhipped by May January 1877
- Ward McAllister (1827–1895), self-appointed arbiter of New York society from the 1860s to the early 1890s
- Clement Clarke Moore (1779–1863), professor and credited author of A Visit from St. Nicholas
- J. P. Morgan (1837–1913), financier, banker, philanthropist, and art collector
- Hubertus von Faber-Castell (1934-2007), billionaire industrial heir and Chinese honorary citizen
- Winthrop Rockefeller (1912–1973), Governor of Arkansas
- Winfield Scott (1786–1866), United States Army general
- Philip H. Sheridan (1831–1888), general in the Union Army
- William Tecumseh Sherman (1820–1891), general in the Union Army and businessman, educator, and author
- Leland Stanford (1824–1893), business magnate, politician and founder of Stanford University
- Edwin Augustus Stevens (1795–1868), founder of the Stevens Institute of Technology
- John Cox Stevens (1785–1857), 1st Commodore of the New York Yacht Club, member of the syndicate that won the first America's Cup trophy in 1851
- A. T. Stewart (1803–1876), retailing pioneer
- Rutherford Stuyvesant (1843–1909), builder of the first apartment building in New York City in 1869
- Eduard von Oppenheim (1831–1909), banker, railway pioneer and legendary horse owner
- Cornelius Vanderbilt (1794–1877), shipping and railroad entrepreneur
- Harold Stirling Vanderbilt (1884–1970), railroad executive, yachtsman and bridge player
- Sumner Welles (1892–1961), government official and diplomat
- George Carroll Whipple III, (1954- ), Society reporter for NY1 and Time Warner Cable News
- Thomas Kennerly Wolfe Jr. [Tom Wolfe] American author and journalist (March 2, 1930 – May 14, 2018)
- James T. Woodward (1837–1910), banker and owner of major thoroughbred horse dynasty
- Julian L. Yale (1850 – 1909), railroad entrepreneur, member of the Yale family

== Reciprocities ==
- Boodle's (London)
- Garrick Club (London)
- Turf Club (London)
- Metropolitan Club (Washington, D.C.)
- Australian Club (Sydney)
- Melbourne Club (Melbourne)
- California Club (Los Angeles)
- Automobile Club de France (Paris)
- Travellers Club (Paris)
- Club de la Chasse et de la Nature (Paris)
- Philadelphia Club (Philadelphia)
- Jupiter Island Club (Florida)
- Società del Giardino (Milan)
- Rio de Janeiro Country Club (Rio de Janeiro)
- Pendennis Club (Louisville)
- Pacific-Union Club (San Francisco)
- Somerset Club (Boston)
- The Commonwealth Club (Richmond)
- Ausable Club (St. Huberts)
- Maryland Club (Baltimore)
- The Oglethorpe Club (Savannah)
- Onteora Club (Tannersville)
- Circulo de Armas (Buenos Aires)
- Munchener Herrenclub e.V. (Munchen)
- Kildare Street and University Club (Dublin)
- Circolo Artistico Tunnel (Genova)
- Circulo dell'Unione (Milano)
- Domino Club (Bologna)
- Nuevo Club (Madrid)
- Sallskapet Club (Stockholm)

== War records ==
More than 300 members of the Union Club joined the U.S. military services during World War II. In 1947, the club published Union Club World War II Records 1940 - 1947, recording the military accomplishments of those members who served during the War and who chose to participate in the project.

== See also ==
- List of American gentlemen's clubs
