= Charles Baker Property =

Historic house in Massachusetts, United States

- U.S. National Register of Historic Places
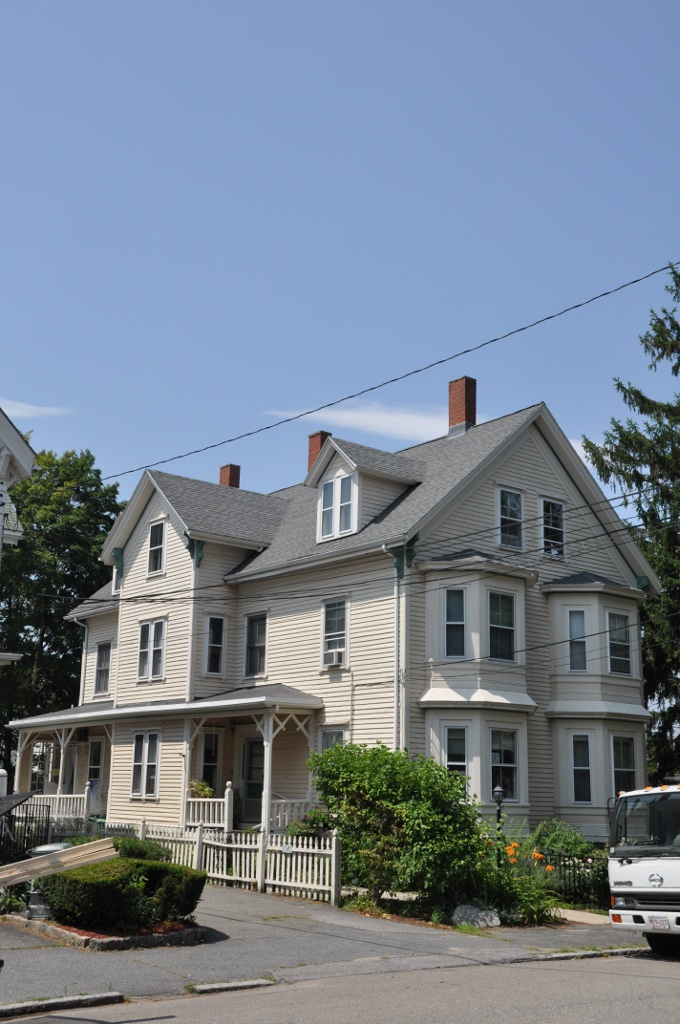

- Location within Massachusetts Location within the United States
- Location: 119–121 Adams St., Waltham, Massachusetts
- Coordinates: 42°22′1.2″N 71°14′27.4″W
- Area: less than one acre
- Built: 1881
- Architectural style: Italianate
- MPS: Waltham MRA
- NRHP reference No.: 89001485
- Added to NRHP: September 28, 1989

The Charles Baker Property is a historic house in Waltham, Massachusetts. Built about 1882, it is a well-preserved example of a period two-family residence built for workers of the American Watch Company. It was listed on the National Register of Historic Places in 1989.

== Description and history ==
The Charles Baker Property is located one block east of the former Waltham Watch Company factory, at the northwest corner of Adams and Cherry Streets. It is a 2 1/2-story wood-frame structure with a cross-gable roof and clapboarded exterior. Its main facade has a pair of projecting polygonal bays rising two stories, and porches with Stick style decorative bracing on the left side where the unit entrances are located. Windows are topped by peaked lintels, and small decorative brackets are found at the corners of the roof.

The house was built c. 1881–83, probably by the American Watch Company, which then owned the lot. The lot was the site of Fuller-Bemis farmhouse, the main house of the farm that dominated Waltham's south side until the 1850s. The Watch Company purchased the farm in 1854, and retained ownership of this lot until the early 1880s. In 1886, the property was owned by Charles Baker, who also owned the house at 107 Adams Street and was a Watch Company employee. The house is a well-preserved example of a typical factory worker duplex of the period.

== See also ==
- National Register of Historic Places listings in Waltham, Massachusetts
