= Harry Whitney McVickar =

American artist and illustrator

- Born: September 2, 1860; Irvington, New York, U.S.
- Died: July 4, 1905 (aged 44); Southampton, New York, U.S.
- Spouse: Maud Robbins (m. 1891)
- Parent(s): William Augustus McVickar; Frances Elizabeth Booth McVickar

Harry Whitney McVickar (September 2, 1860 – July 4, 1905) was an American artist, illustrator, and real estate investor who was prominent member of New York society during the Gilded Age.

== Early life ==
McVickar was born on September 2, 1860, in Irvington, New York, and grew up at the McVickar House. He was the son of the Rev. Dr. William Augustus McVickar (1827–1877), the first rector of the Church of St. Barnabas, and Frances Elizabeth "Fanny" (née Booth) McVickar (1829–1910). Among his siblings was William Bard McVickar, who married Mary Louisa Miller (daughter of George Macculloch Miller) and Anna McVickar.

His paternal grandparents were Eliza (née Bard) McVickar and The Rev. John McVickar, an Episcopalian minister and two-time acting president of Columbia University who moved to Irvington to be close to his friends Washington Irving and John Jay, and to establish a school, which became what is known today as Bard College (named after his father's nephew by marriage, John Bard).

== Career ==
McVickar started his career as an artist and illustrator, with his work appearing in Life and Harper's Bazaar, and is considered one of the founders of Vogue, which was then a weekly newspaper. He illustrated several books, including Daisy Miller and Mr. Bonaparte of Corsica (1895), and The Evolution of Woman (1896), published by Harper and Brothers.

Reportedly, he made enough money as an artist to set himself up in the real estate business. He was a member of S. Van Rensselaer Cruger & Co. until the death of Stephen Van Rensselaer Cruger (a grandson of patroon Stephen Van Rensselaer (Note: In February 1898, Stephen Van Rensselaer Cruger was the sole surviving executor of the estate of Margaret Johnston Bard (who died in April 1875), the widow of John Bard, who sued Cruger alleging that he held back money due to him under Margaret's will.)) in 1898, at which point McVickar became the head of McVickar & Co., which later became known as the McVickar Realty Trust Company. The McVickar Realty Trust Company eventually merged with the Empire State Trust Company in 1904, emerging as the Empire Trust Company, of which Harry became First Vice President taking charge of the real estate department and president Leroy W. Baldwin taking hold of the banking end. He also served as a director of the Knickerbocker Trust Company and was the treasurer of Gaillard & Co.

=== Society life ===
In 1892, McVickar and his wife were both included in Ward McAllister's "Four Hundred", purported to be an index of New York's best families, published in The New York Times. Conveniently, 400 was the number of people that could fit into Mrs. Astor's ballroom. Harry was a member of the Century Association and the Lambs Club.

== Personal life ==
On January 14, 1891, McVickar married socialite and painter Maud Robbins (d. 1955) at Grace Church before 2,000 people in a ceremony officiated by Bishop Henry C. Potter. She was the daughter of Henry Asher Robbins, an industrialist associated with the Waltham Watch Company, and Lizzie Pelham Bend Robbins. Her brother, the architect Harry Pelham Robbins, was married to Emily Frances Welles, the daughter of Benjamin Welles and sister of Sumner Welles, the Undersecretary of State in the Roosevelt administration. Emily and Benjamin Sumner Welles were grand-nieces and grand-nephews of Caroline Astor.

McVickar died of pleurisy on July 4, 1905, at his father-in-law's residence, Asher House, in Southampton, New York. He contracted pleurisy "while he was automobiling in Europe" six weeks earlier. His widow remarried to Theron Roundell Strong, a nephew of mayor William L. Strong, in 1918 and later died at her residence in the Carlyle Hotel in December 1955.
