= Charles Baker House =

Historic house in Massachusetts, United States

- U.S. National Register of Historic Places
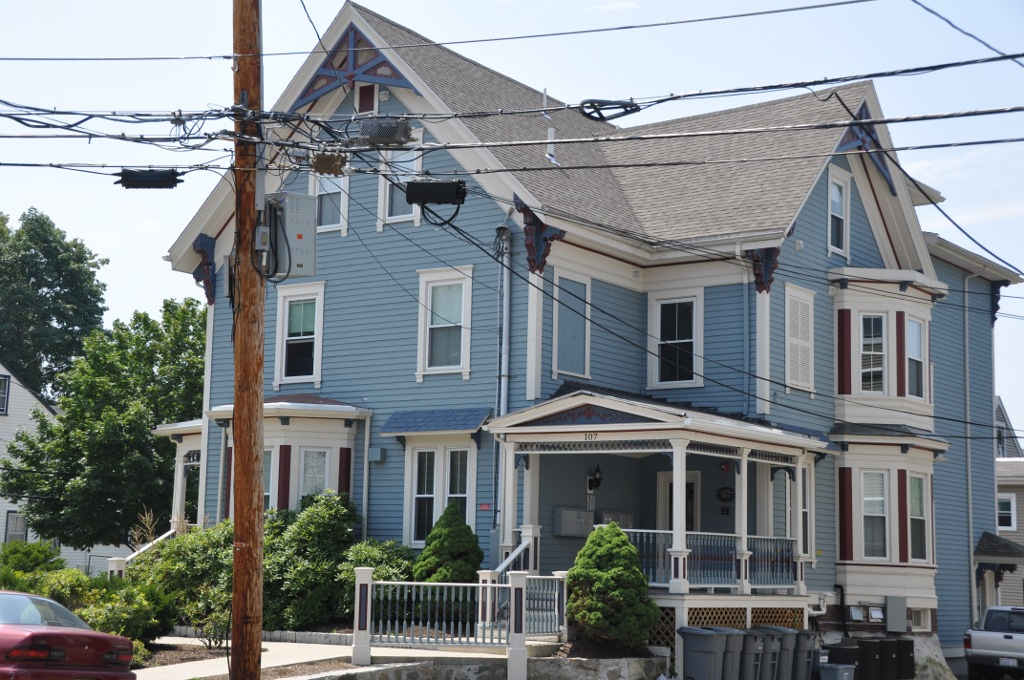

- Location within Massachusetts Location within the United States
- Location: 107 Adams St., Waltham, Massachusetts
- Coordinates: 42°22′2.8″N 71°14′27″W
- Area: less than one acre
- Built: 1880
- Architectural style: Stick/Eastlake
- MPS: Waltham MRA
- NRHP reference No.: 89001484
- Added to NRHP: September 28, 1989

The Charles Baker House is a historic house in Waltham, Massachusetts. Built about 1880, it is one of the city's best examples of Stick style architecture, and a good example of worker housing built for employees of the Waltham Watch Company. It was listed on the National Register of Historic Places in 1989.

== Description and history ==
The Charles Baker House is located one block east of the former Waltham Watch Company factory, at the northwest corner of Adams and Cherry Streets. It is a 2 1/2-story wood-frame structure with a cross-gable roof and clapboarded exterior. A gable end faces Adams Street, two bays wide, with a projecting single-story bay window in the left bay, its roof eave with small wooden brackets. The main roof has brackets at the corners, and Stick style woodwork in not just the main gable, but in the gables of smaller roof dormers and the projecting side gables. Single-story porches with spindled valances flank the Adams Street facade. Most windows are framed by moulding with shallow cornices above and tab feet below the sill.

The land on which the house stands was sold by the Waltham Watch Company in 1868 to Charles Baker. A house of different configuration is recorded as standing here in 1874; the present house appears on an 1886 map. It is a rare example of a worker's boarding house built for employees of the Waltham Watch Company. Charles Baker was a company employee of unknown position, and lived here until about 1912. He also owned a second house (119-121 Adams St.) nearby as a rental property.

== See also ==
- National Register of Historic Places listings in Waltham, Massachusetts
