= Pitkin =

Pitkin may refer to:

== People ==
- Pitkin (surname)

== Places ==
- Pitkin, Colorado, USA, a town in Gunnison County
- Pitkin County, Colorado, USA
- Pitkin, Louisiana, USA, a community in Vernon Parish
- The Pitkin Formation, a sedimentary rock layer

== Fictional characters ==
- A character played by Sir Norman Wisdom

== Other ==
- Pitkin Publishing, an imprint of The History Press
