= American system of watch manufacturing =

Set of manufacturing techniques and best-practices

The American system of watch manufacturing is a set of manufacturing techniques and best-practices to be used in the manufacture of watches and timepieces. It is derived from the American system of manufacturing techniques (also called "armory practices"), a set of general techniques and guidelines for manufacturing that was developed in the 19th century. The system calls for using interchangeable parts, which is made possible by a strict system of organization, the extensive use of the machine shop, and quality control systems utilizing gauges to ensure precise and uniform dimensions. It was developed by Aaron Lufkin Dennison, a watch repairman who was inspired by the manufacturing techniques of the United States Armory at Springfield, Massachusetts, which manufactured identical parts, allowing rapid assembly of the final products. He proposed using similar techniques for the manufacture of watches. Before the American system of watch manufacturing was developed, watchmaking was primarily a European business. It involved making certain parts under the roof of a factory while obtaining other parts from piece workers who used their own cottages as workshops.

== Beginning of standardized production ==
Henry Pitkin and his brother James were jewelry makers in Hartford, Connecticut in the mid-1830s before their business failed as a result of the panic of 1837 and they turned their attention to the manufacture of watches. The brothers were able to construct crude machinery for the production of watches, particularly for the manufacture of pallets. Their first complete movement was completed in 1838; a total of between 800 and 900 watches were completed through 1845. Surviving examples of Pitkin watches showed that the parts were, in fact, interchangeable.

== Waltham Watch Company ==
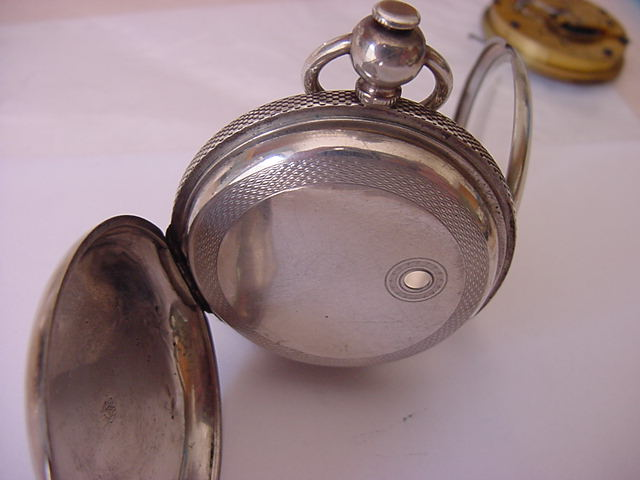
Case back showing hinges, Waltham model 57 American made.

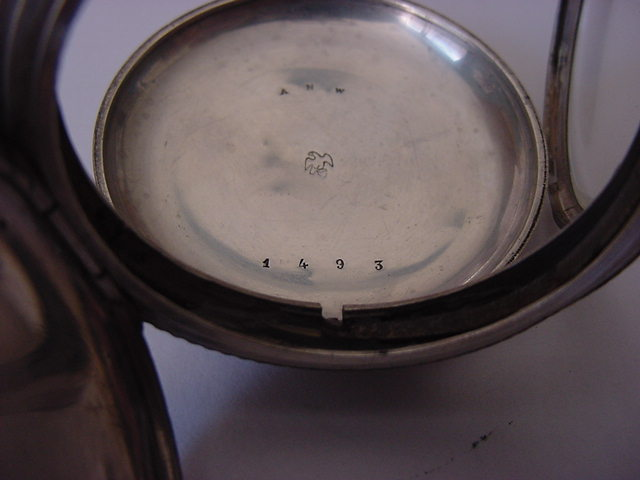
Case back inside photo with hallmark of the Waltham watch company; a model 57.

In 1850 Aaron Dennison partnered with Edward Howard, a reputable clockmaker. The two formed plans to construct a line of watches with interchangeable parts based on Dennison’s visit to the Springfield armory. They built a factory in Roxbury, with financial backing provided by Samuel Curtis and DP Davis (a partner of Howard in his clock business). This company initially operated under the name American Horologe Company but was quickly changed to the Warren Manufacturing Company to hide its purpose from foreign suppliers. The company’s initial focus was on the production of an 8-day watch, though this proved to be too expensive and not very accurate. Instead, the attention was turned to a 30-hour watch designed very similarly to what ultimately became the standard for an American 18 size watch. The first such watch was completed in 1852; it carried the serial number of 18, and was marked "Warren." Approximately 80 "Warren" watches were produced, followed by about 900 marked "Samuel Curtis", and a further 4000 marked "Dennison, Howard, and Davis". The factory was moved to Waltham, Massachusetts around 1857 and named the Waltham Watch Company. The basic design of this watch was used for several years as the 1857 model Waltham.

Applying armory practices to the manufacturing of watches carried both opportunity and risk for the Waltham Watch Company. The generally high price of watches allowed for a large investment in research and development, which was aimed toward the reduction of labor costs. At the time, labor costs were a major factor contributing to the high cost of watches; any system that significantly reduced labor costs would provide a substantial increase in profit. Substantial reduction in labor costs proved elusive, however. In 1910, after 40 years of manufacturing improvements, labor still accounted for 80% of the cost of watches, based on data from the Elgin National Watch Company.

Watches require very strict production tolerances and very few manufacturing defects, making labor cost reduction difficult. Other products made via armory practices, such as firearms and sewing machines, generally have much looser tolerances than are necessary for watchmaking, which involves numerous tiny gears that must fit together precisely. The intent of applying armory practices to watchmaking was to emphasize tight tolerances in the manufacturing of the component parts, so that final assembly could be done by lesser-skilled workers without the need for an expert watchmaker to personally oversee each step of manufacture.

In order to achieve strict tolerances, watch manufacturers largely manufactured their own machine tools and machine parts. Elgin, for example, manufactured almost two drill bits for each watch it manufactured. The knowledge of how to manufacture machines that could manufacture watches spread: from Waltham to Elgin and then to dozens of other American watch companies and manufacturers of other products. Techniques such as jigs, stops, and measuring devices on machines were not just refined, but other techniques were also developed.

Statistical methods of parts classification was one example used to reduce waste. If a gear staff (axle) and a jewel bearing hole were designed to be a given size, then the parts that most closely met those design goals were used in the highest grade watches. Accordingly, staffs that were too large would be matched to watch jewels with holes that were too large, and together they would be used on lower grade watches.

== See also ==
- E. Howard & Co. – American clock and watch company
- Benrus – American watch company
- Illinois Watch Company – Defunct American watch manufacturer
