= Dennison Watch =

Swiss watchmaker

Dennison
- Native name: Dennison Watch Co.
- Formerly: Waltham Watch Company; Dennison Watch Case Company, A.L.
- Type: Société anonyme
- Industry: Watchmaking
- Founded: 1874; 152 years ago London, United Kingdom
- Founder: Aaron Lufkin Dennison
- Headquarters: London, United Kingdom
- Area served: Worldwide
- Key people: Stéphane Cheikh (CEO); Emmanuel Gueit (Lead Designer)
- Products: Watches
- Website: dennisonwatch.com

Dennison Watch Co. is a British watchmaker headquartered in London, United Kingdom, founded by Aaron Lufkin Dennison in London in 1874 as Dennison Watch Case Company. A pioneer in horology, the company went dormant in 1967 and resumed watch production as of 2024.

As of 2025, the brand won the Challenge Watch Prize at the prestigious Grand Prix d'Horlogerie de Genève, in Geneva.

== History ==
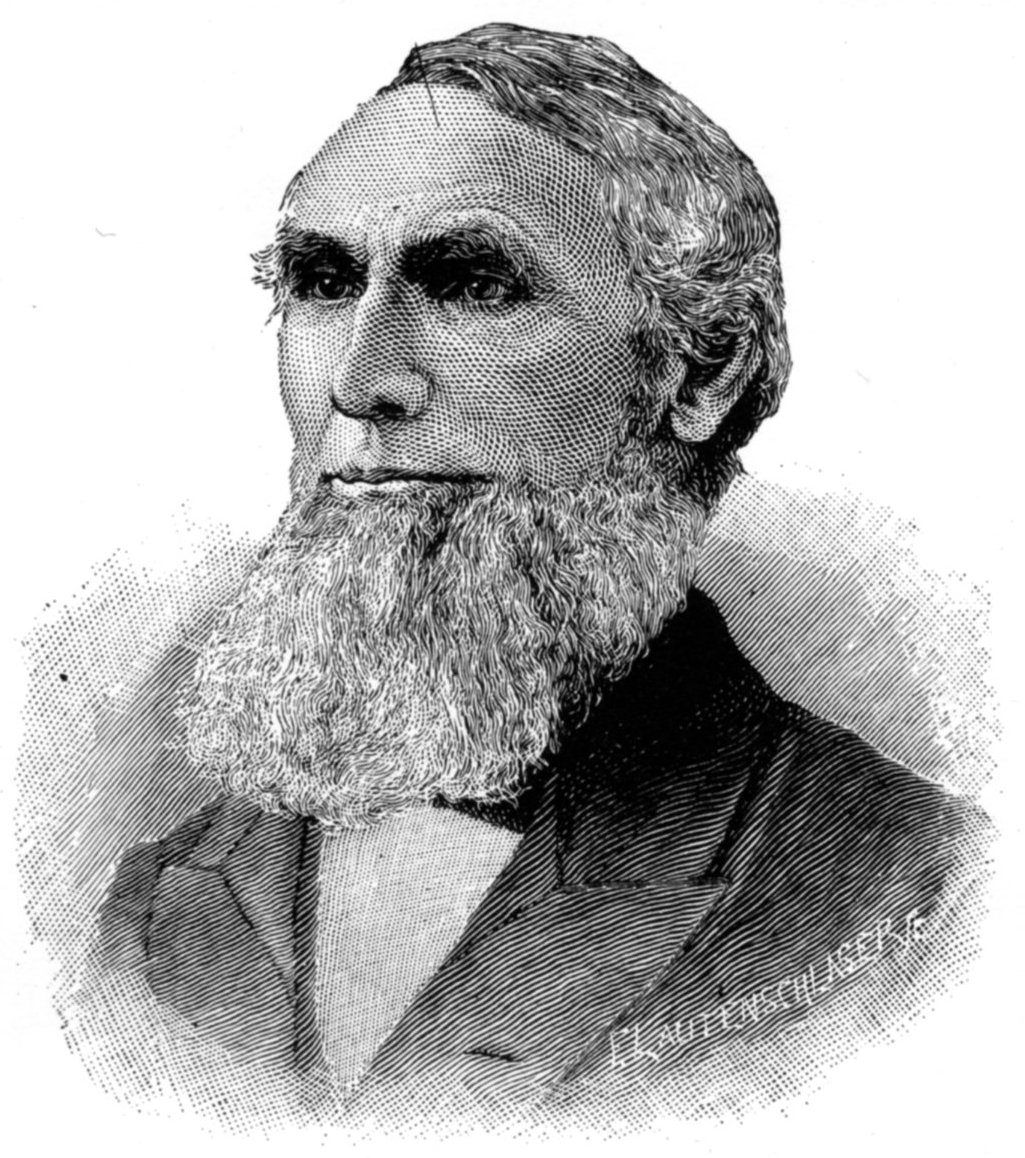
Dennison, founder of Dennison Watch

In about 1862, Aaron Dennison started a business making watch cases in Birmingham and supplied the London office of the Waltham Watch Company. In 1879, Alfred Wigley joined Aaron to form the firm of Dennison, Wigley & Company.

By 1886, the company had 100 employees, and produced 60,000-80,000 cases annually. The company produced watch cases for a number of manufacturers including Jaeger-LeCoultre, Longines, Rolex, Omega, and Tudor, and Vertex.

Following Aaron Dennison's death in 1895, his son Franklin became a partner in the firm. This company continued until 1905 when it was renamed the Dennison Watch Case Company, and that company continued until 1967.

=== Revival ===
During the second part of the 20th century, the brand was dormant. As of 2010, its trademark was registered again in London. The brand resumed production in 2024 and has since gained traction again.

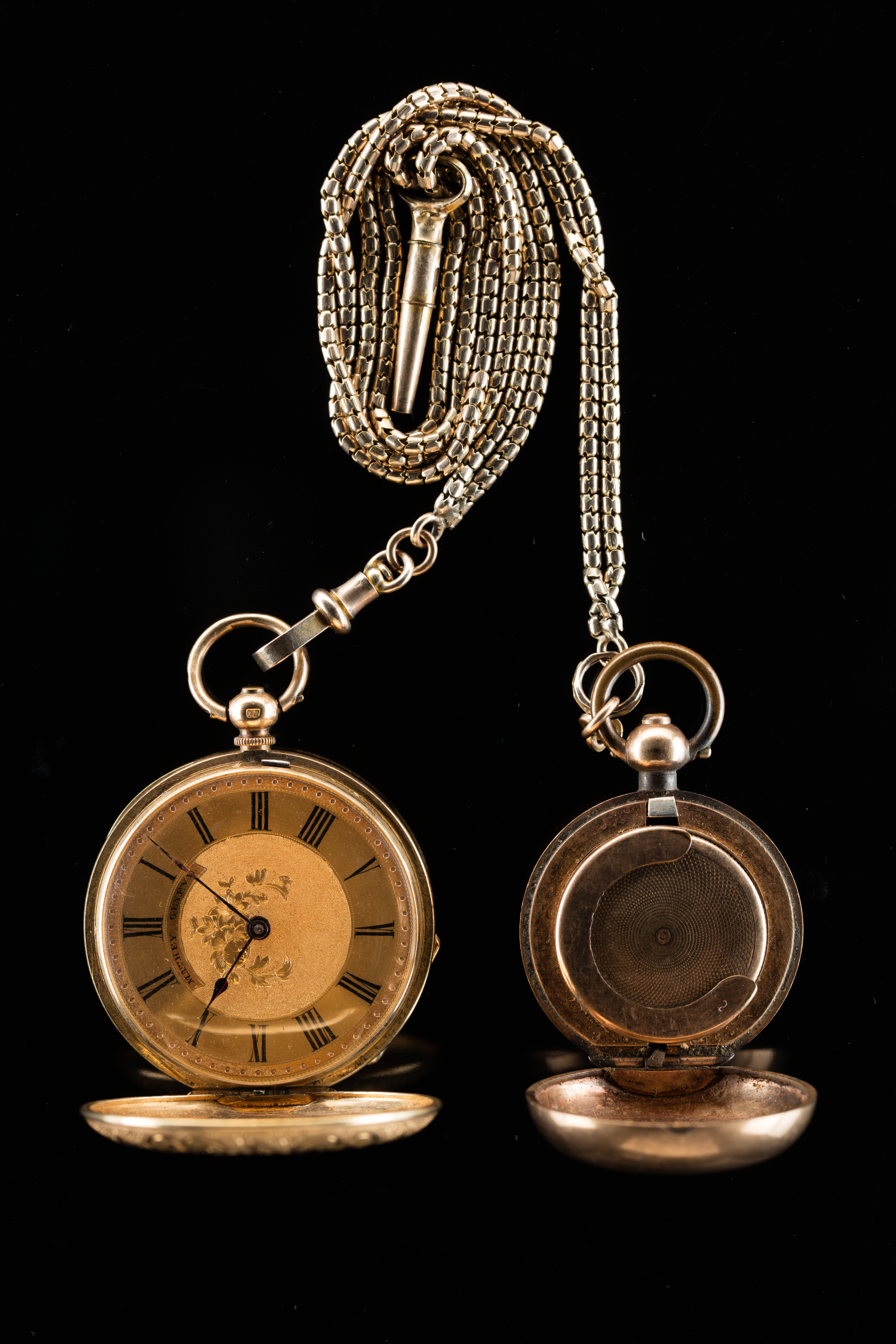
One of the first Dennison watches sold in June 1875

Designer Emmanuel Gueit, son of Jean-Claude Gueit, the designer who brought stone dials to watches and created Piaget’s statement cuffs and necklaces of the 1960s and ’70s is responsible for the brands successful ALD Dual Time, where each pair of hour–minute hands is set by its own crown, located left and right.
