= Pitkin (surname) =

Pitkin is a surname. Notable people with the surname include:

- Frederick Walker Pitkin, Governor of Colorado from 1879 to 1883
- Hanna Fenichel Pitkin, writer and philosopher
- Henry Pitkin, American pioneer watchmaker, silversmith and businessman
- Joan Breslin Pitkin, American state delegate
- John R. G. Pitkin, American politician
- Lorraine J. Pitkin, American women's activist
- Timothy Pitkin, American congressman
- Walter B. Pitkin, American philosopher
