= Mainspring gauge =

Mainspring gauges were used to measure the sizes of watch mainsprings so that replacement springs could be ordered from a supply house. Mainsprings are characterised by their strength (thickness) and height (width).

== European gauges ==
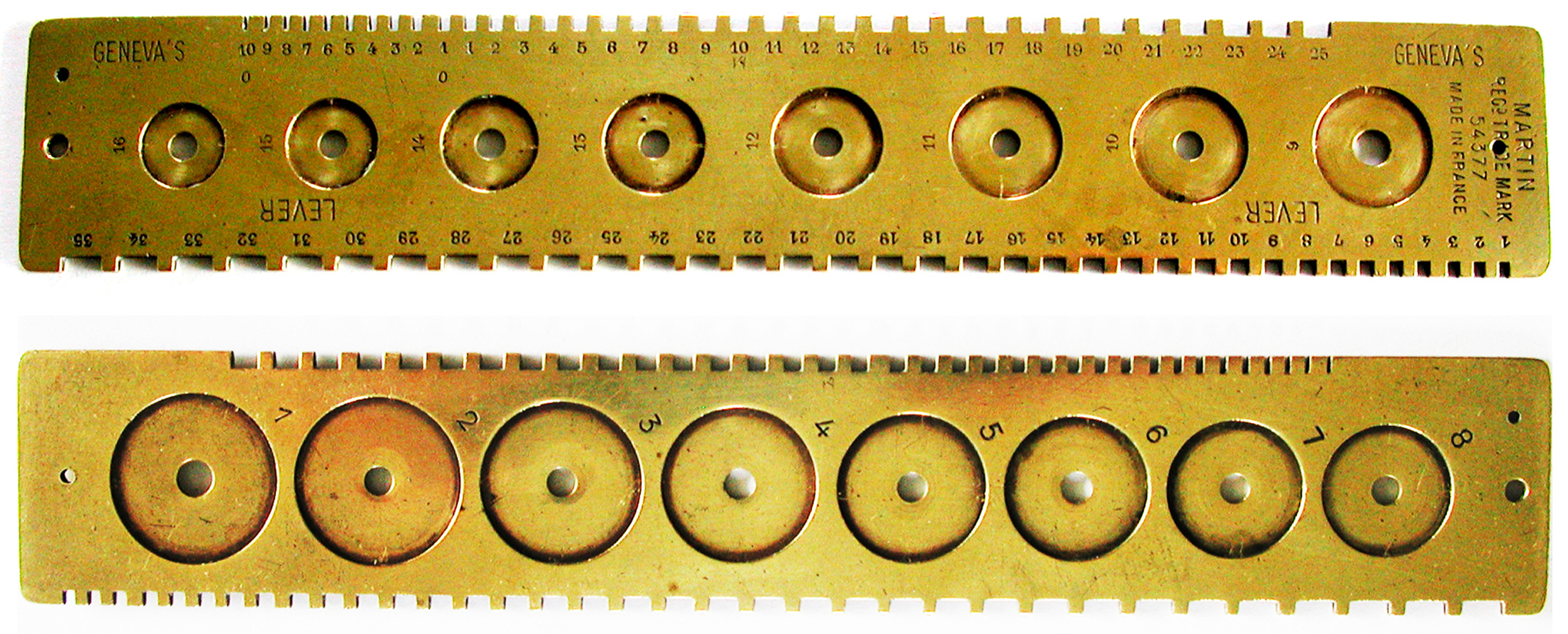
Figure 1: Martin mainspring gauge (front and back views). Actual size 181 x 30 mm.

They were made by several European companies and are all similar to the gauge in Figure 1, being brass plates with notches on both edges and round sinks on both sides. The height of a spring is measured by finding the smallest notch on the edge of the gauge into which it will fit. The strength is determined by finding the smallest round sink into which the mainspring barrel (horology) will fit. (The diameter of the barrel is related to the mainspring length and strength, but this method for determining strength only works for springs of standard lengths.)

Each manufacturer used a different arbitrary scale to describe mainspring sizes, but these sizes are usually based on the French inch.

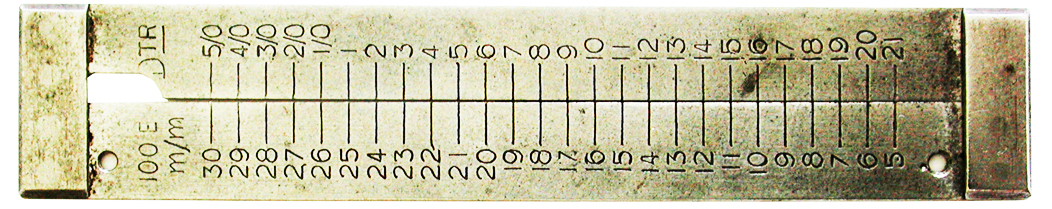
Figure 2: Martin mainspring slit gauge. Actual size 87 x 17 mm.

A better method for measuring strength is to use a slit gauge, Figure 2, with which the thickness of the mainspring is measured directly. This gauge uses a scale of sizes running from 21 (0.05 mm) to 5/0 (0.30 mm).

Scales used in watchmaking generally do not use negative numbers. Instead, after size 0 there is 2/0 or 00, 3/0 or 000, and so on.

== Dennison "US Standard" gauges ==
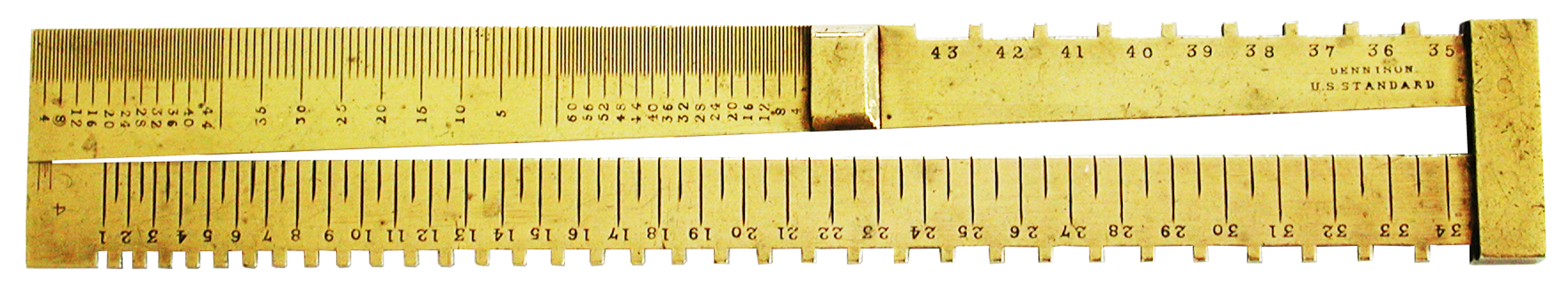
Figure 3: Dennison combined gauge. Actual size 150 × 19 mm.

About 1840 Aaron Lufkin Dennison devised a gauge "upon which all the different parts of a watch could be accurately measured", Figure 3. Later this became known as the "US Standard" gauge. The edges have the usual notches for mainspring heights (based on the Imperial inch, but there is no obvious way to determine mainspring strength, except perhaps by barrel diameter using one of the three scales on the top left (which are Imperial inch scales in 1/64 and 1/32 divisions).

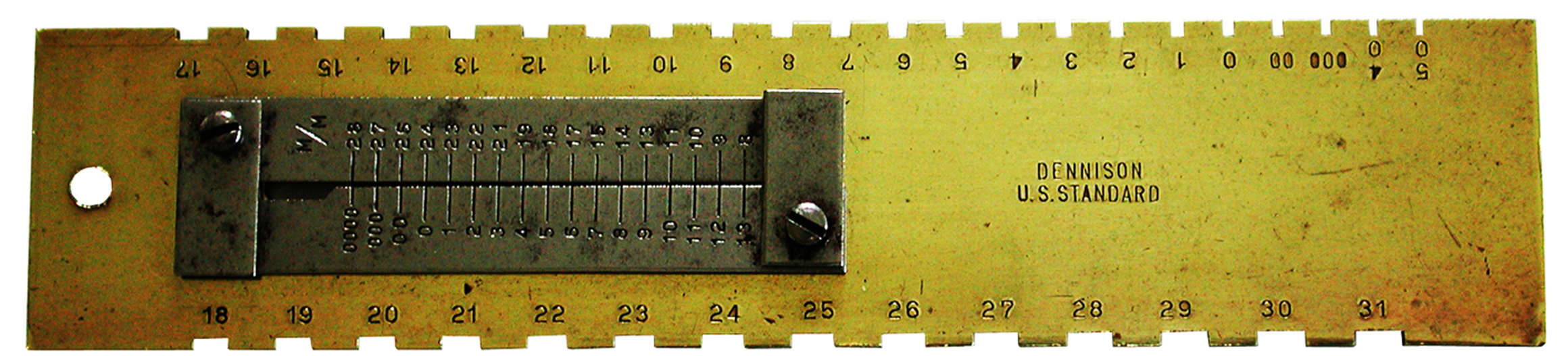
Figure 4: Dennison simplified mainspring gauge

Over time, this gauge was simplified and reduced to being purely a mainspring gauge, Figure 4. Only the height notches remain and a thickness slit gauge added to it. The slit gauge is also based on the Imperial inch, but it often has metric equivalents which are crude approximations.
