= Dunbeath Castle =

Castle in Highland, Scotland

Coordinates: 58°14′06″N 3°26′08″W

Designations

Inventory of Gardens and Designed Landscapes in Scotland
- Official name: Dunbeath Castle
- Designated: 30 March 2003
- Reference no.: GDL00150

Interactive map of Dunbeath Castle

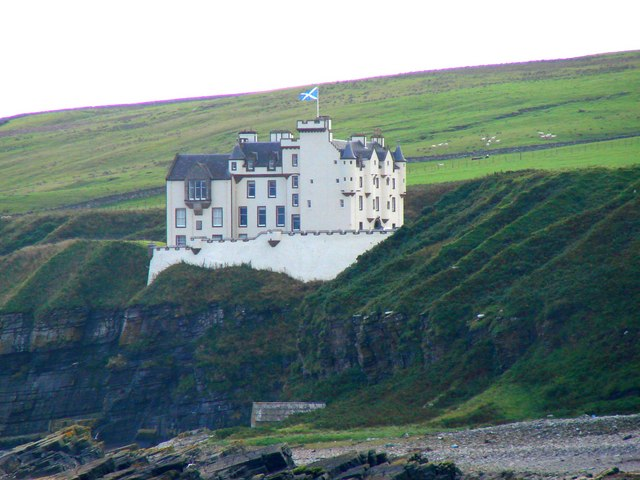
Dunbeath Castle

Dunbeath Castle is located on the east coast of Caithness, 2 kilometres (1.2 mi) south of Dunbeath, in northern Scotland. Although a castle has stood here since the 15th century, the present building is of mainly 17th-century origin, with 19th-century extensions. The castle is a 19,669 sq ft (1,827.3 m^{2}) Category A listed building and the grounds are included in the Inventory of Gardens and Designed Landscapes in Scotland.

== History ==
A castle is first recorded on the rocky peninsula at Dunbeath in 1428, when the lands belonged to the Earl of Caithness. The first recorded laird was Alexander Sutherland. It later became the property of the Clan Sinclair through the marriage of Marjory Sutherland, the daughter of Alexander Sutherland, to William Sinclair (1410–1484), the first Sinclair Earl of Caithness. The Sinclairs replaced the earlier structure with a four-storey tower house in 1620.

After control for some time (during an unspecified period) by Lord Forbes of Geanies, then baron of Dunbeath, the property was reacquired by John Sinclair circa 1624. He is likely the owner "who extensively remodelled Dunbeath castle and built the upper storeys in the 1630s".

In March 1650, Dunbeath was attacked by the Royalist forces of James Graham, 1st Marquess of Montrose, during the Wars of the Three Kingdoms. Sir John Sinclair rode to Edinburgh to warn of Montrose's arrival, leaving his wife Catherine Fraser to defend Dunbeath against Sir John Hurry. She soon surrendered, and a Royalist garrison was installed. Montrose was defeated in April at the Battle of Carbisdale, and the opposition forces, under David Leslie, recaptured the castle.

The castle was extensively remodelled in the 17th century by Sir William Sinclair, and again in 1853 and 1881, when David Bryce was the architect. The major modification was making the "northern front of the castle symmetrical and [laying] out an approach down a three-quarter-mile-long, arrow-straight, tree-lined drive".

From 1894 to 1945, the castle was owned by Vice-Admiral Sir Edwyn Alexander-Sinclair. In that year, after 325 years of occupation by the Sinclair Family, the castle was sold to Bertram Currie. In 1967 it was sold again to Harry Blythe and Helen (Sinclaire) Blythe. The castle remained in their possession until 1976 when it was sold to Ray Stanton Avery. In 1997 the castle was sold to Stuart Wyndham Murray-Threipland and his wife. The property was listed for sale again in 2023, including 20 estate houses and cottages. At the time, the 13 bedroom, nine bathroom, castle remained a private home; only the gardens were open to the public, by appointment.

The Castle and grounds were sold in 2024 for £25,000,000.00.

The new owner of Dunbeath Castle is a company called Dunbeath Estates Limited, whose sole director is Don Macleod. The identity of the buyer was hidden through a legal loophole involving trusts and company filings.

== The castle ==
The oldest part of the castle lies at the south-west corner, and dates largely from the 17th century. More modern additions have been made to the north and east, in a Scots Baronial style to match the earlier building. The interiors are much altered. The defensive site was enhanced by a dry ditch on the landward side, which cuts across the narrow promontory on which the castle stands.

== In popular culture ==
The 2023 Hindi movie Neeyat was filmed at Dunbeath.
