= Benjamin Welles =

American philanthropist

- Born: Benjamin Sumner Welles Jr. January 11, 1857; Boston, Massachusetts, U.S.
- Died: December 24, 1935 (aged 78); New York City, U.S.
- Burial place: Woodlawn Cemetery, Bronx, New York, U.S.
- Education: Harvard College; Columbia Law School
- Political party: Republican
- Spouse: Frances Wyeth Swan (m. 1886; died 1911)
- Children: Emily Frances Welles; Sumner Welles
- Relatives: Van Cortlandt family

Benjamin Sumner Welles Jr. (January 11, 1857 – December 24, 1935) was an American philanthropist who was a descendant of many prominent Colonial families.

== Early life ==
Benjamin Sumner Welles Jr. was born in Boston, Massachusetts on January 11, 1857. He was one of five children born to Katharine Elida Schermerhorn (1828–1858) and Benjamin Sumner Welles Sr. (1823–1904), a dry-goods merchant who was a descendant of Colonial Governor Thomas Welles and Governor Increase Sumner. His siblings included Helen Schermerhorn Welles, who married George Lovett Kingsland (son of Mayor Ambrose Kingsland), and Harriet Katherine Welles.

His maternal grandparents were Abraham Schermerhorn, a wealthy New York City merchant, and Helen Van Courtlandt (née White) Schermerhorn of the Van Cortlandt family. Through his grandfather, he was descended from Jacob Janse Schermerhorn, who settled in New York from the Netherlands in 1636. His maternal aunt was Caroline Schermerhorn Astor, known as "the Mrs. Astor", who was married to the immensely wealthy William Backhouse Astor Jr. of the Astor family, and was considered the Gatekeeper of New York Society during the Gilded Age.

Among his many cousins were Emily Astor, who married the politician James J. Van Alen, Helen Schermerhorn Astor, who married the diplomat James Roosevelt Roosevelt (the elder half-brother of President Franklin Delano Roosevelt), and John Jacob Astor IV, who married Ava Lowle Willing and, later, married socialite Madeleine Talmage Force, before perishing aboard the Titanic in 1912.

Welles graduated from Harvard College in 1878, of which his family had been producing graduates dating back to 1707 with Samuel Welles. He also spent at year at Columbia Law School.

== Career ==
Following a year spent at law school, Welles spent a year and a half in Europe travelling. After his "grand tour," he returned to New York City and was engaged in the business of managing his family affairs. Following his marriage in 1886, the newlyweds spent a year together in Europe. He was an officer of the 27th Assembly District Republican Club, and in 1901 called it the "only 'anti-machine' one in New York. Largely through our efforts a good majority was secured for a son of Harvard, Governor Roosevelt."

Welles was the treasurer of the House of Rest, a philanthropic sanitarium near Yonkers, and belonged to the Society of Colonial Wars, University Club of New York, Union Club of the City of New York, and the Harvard Club of New York.

=== Society life ===
In 1892, Welles and his wife were both included in Ward McAllister's "Four Hundred", purported to be an index of New York's best families, published in The New York Times. Conveniently, 400 was the number of people that could fit into his aunt, Mrs. Astor's, ballroom.

McAllister also had designated Benjamin Welles, a member of the Patriarchs, a clique of twenty-five men whom he had organized in 1872 to 'create and lead' New York society."

== Personal life ==
On October 27, 1886, Welles was married to Frances Wyeth Swan (1863–1911) at the West Presbyterian Church in New York by the Reverend Howard Crosby. She was the daughter of Frederick George Swan, an attorney, and Emily (née Wyeth) Swan. The couple lived in New York City. Together, they were the parents of two children:

- Emily Frances Welles (1888–1962), who, in 1908, married banker Harry Pelham Robbins (1874–1946), who was the son of Henry Asher Robbins, a founder of the Waltham Watch Company, and the nephew of George H. Bend.
- Benjamin Sumner Welles III (1892–1961), the United States Ambassador to Cuba and United States Under Secretary of State during Franklin D. Roosevelt's administration. He married three times before his death in 1961.

After his wife's death, he resided at the St. Regis New York, and maintained a home in Islip, New York on Long Island.

Welles died of pneumonia on December 26, 1935, at the Presbyterian Hospital in New York City. He was buried at the Woodlawn Cemetery in the Bronx. In his will, Welles bequeathed $10,000, in trust, which provided that the money shall be used for a scholarship, to be known as the Benjamin Welles Scholarship, from which the income was to be paid to any deserving undergraduate descendant of Benjamin Welles, Harvard Class of 1800. If no descendant needs financial assistance, the income could be used to pay for another undergraduate in the discretion of the president of the University.

=== Descendants ===
Through his daughter Emily, he was a grandfather of Frances Emily Robbins (1910–1937), who also died of pneumonia at the age of 26 in 1937.

Through his only son, who was known by his middle name Sumner, he was a grandfather of Benjamin Welles (1916–2002), a foreign correspondent for The New York Times, who later wrote his father's biography, and Arnold Welles (1918–2002).
