= Henry Asher Robbins =

American manufacturer

- Born: 1829; Berlin, Connecticut, U.S.
- Died: January 21, 1914 (aged 84); New York City, New York, U.S.
- Occupation: Founder of the Waltham Watch Company
- Spouse: Lizzie Pelham Bend (m. 1866)
- Children: 2

Henry Asher Robbins (1829 – January 21, 1914) was an American manufacturer who was prominent member of New York society during the Gilded Age.

== Early life ==
Robbins was born in 1829 in Berlin, Connecticut. His father was the pastor of the Kensington Congregational Church in Kensington, Connecticut for forty-three years.

Robbins was a direct descendant of Asher Robbins, the United States Senator from Rhode Island.

== Career ==
Together with his brother Royal E. Robbins, he founded the Waltham Watch Company, which merged with Robbins, Appleton & Co., a watch importing company based out of Boston that owned the Waltham, Massachusetts based American Watch Company.

=== Society life ===
In 1892, both Robins and his wife were both included in Ward McAllister's "Four Hundred", purported to be an index of New York's best families, published in The New York Times. Conveniently, 400 was the number of people that could fit into Mrs. Astor's ballroom.

== Personal life ==
In 1866, Robbins married Elizabeth "Lizzie" Pelham Bend (c. 1845–1933). Lizzie was the sister of prominent banker George H. Bend. Together, they were the parents of two children, a son and a daughter:

- Maud Robbins (d. 1955), who married Harry Whitney McVickar (1860–1905), in 1891.
- Henry "Harry" Pelham Robbins (1874–1946), who graduated from Columbia University in 1893 and became an architect. He married Emily Frances Welles (1888–1962), the daughter of Benjamin Welles and sister of Sumner Welles, the Undersecretary of State in the Roosevelt administration. Emily and Sumner were grand-nieces and grand-nephews of Caroline Astor.

The Robbins built "Asher House" in Southampton, New York designed by Grosvenor Atterbury.

Robbins died of pneumonia at his apartment in the Waldorf-Astoria Hotel in New York City on January 21, 1914. His widow died at her residence, 540 Park Avenue in New York, in July 1933. Her funeral was held at St. Andrew's Dune Church in Southampton.
