= R. Stanton Avery =

American inventor (1907–1997)

Ray Stanton Avery
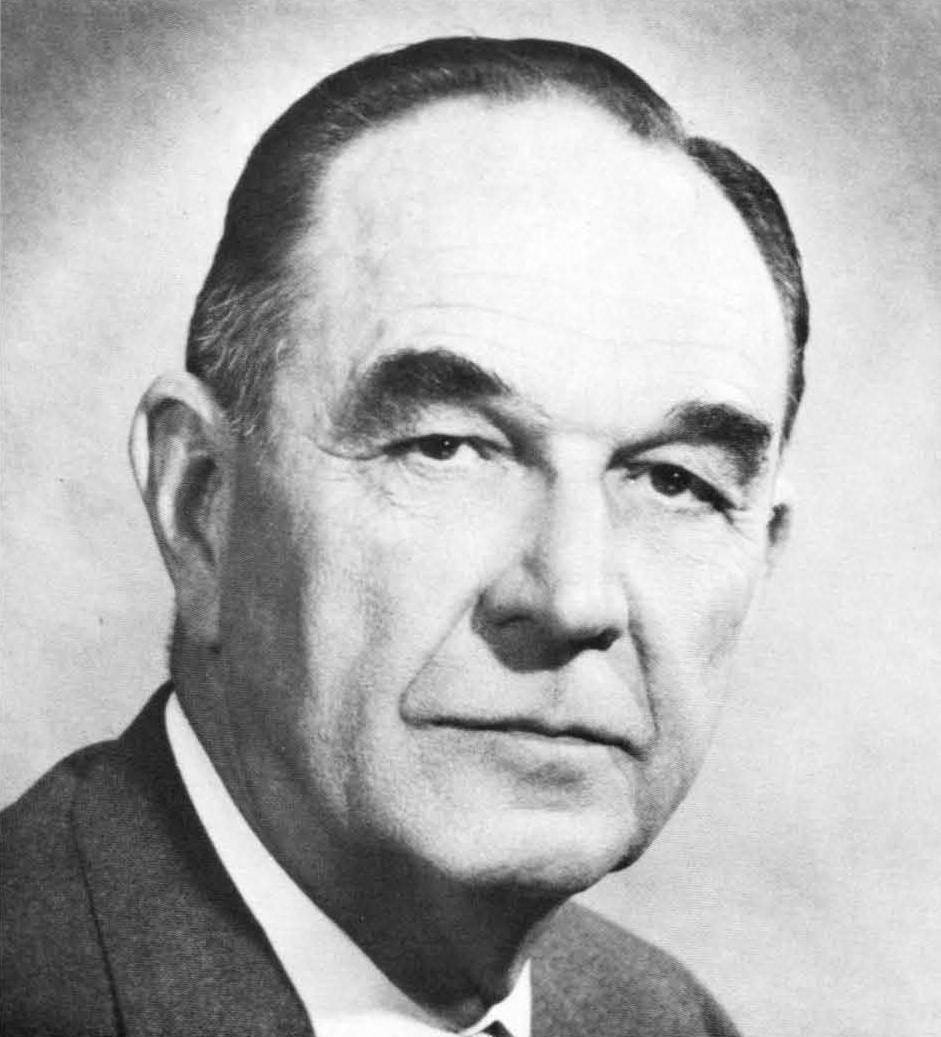
- R. Stanton Avery in 1974
- Born: January 13, 1907; Oklahoma
- Died: December 12, 1997 (aged 90); Pasadena, California
- Other names: Stan Avery, Stan the Sticker Man
- Education: Bachelor of Arts, Pomona College, 1932
- Occupations: Businessman, inventor
- Employer: Avery Dennison Corporation
- Known for: Invention of the resealable sticker, philanthropic donor, trustee of nonprofit organizations
- Spouses: Margaret Lolhker (m. 1932) Dorothy Durfee, c. 1935 (died 1964) Ernestine Onderdonk (m. 1965; died 1997)

Ray Stanton Avery (January 13, 1907 – December 12, 1997) was an American inventor, most known for creating self-adhesive labels (modern stickers). Using a $100 loan from his then-fiancé Dorothy Durfee and combining used machine parts with a saber saw, he created and patented the world's first self-adhesive (also called pressure sensitive) die-cut labeling machine. In 1935, he founded what is now the Avery Dennison Corporation and Avery Products Corporation.

Avery served as chairman of the board of trustees of California Institute of Technology, and he was a member of the board of trustees of the Huntington Library and the board of trustees of the Los Angeles County Museum of Art.

Avery House at Caltech is named after him.

== Early life ==
Ray Stanton Avery was born on January 13, 1907, in Oklahoma City. He lived in a rented chicken coop and worked at the Midnight Mission as a clerk to put himself through college.

Avery graduated from Pomona College with a humanities degree in 1932. He was a member of the Kappa Theta Epsilon fraternity and a member of the "Oriental study expedition", a group of men from Pomona College who traveled to the Orient and spent about a year there before returning to the college.

== Stickers ==
National Sticker Day is celebrated on January 13, in honor of Avery, who was born on that day. While gum paste (requiring moistening) had been used on labels since the 1880s, Avery is credited with creating the first pressure-sensitive sticker (self-adhering without moistening) in 1935.

== Philanthropy ==
Avery donated generously to educational and arts institutions. He was known for philanthropy in Southern California, having supported the California Institute of Technology, the Los Angeles County Museum of Art and the Huntington Library.

In 1996, he created Avery House at Caltech, a residence housing undergraduates, graduate students and faculty.

== Personal life ==
Avery married his first wife, Margaret Lolhker, on August 6, 1932. She was also a graduate with honors of Pomona College, just as Avery was.

== See also ==
- Dunbeath Castle, purchased by Avery in 1976
