= American Waltham Watch Company Historic District =

Historic district in Massachusetts, United States

- U.S. National Register of Historic Places
- U.S. Historic district
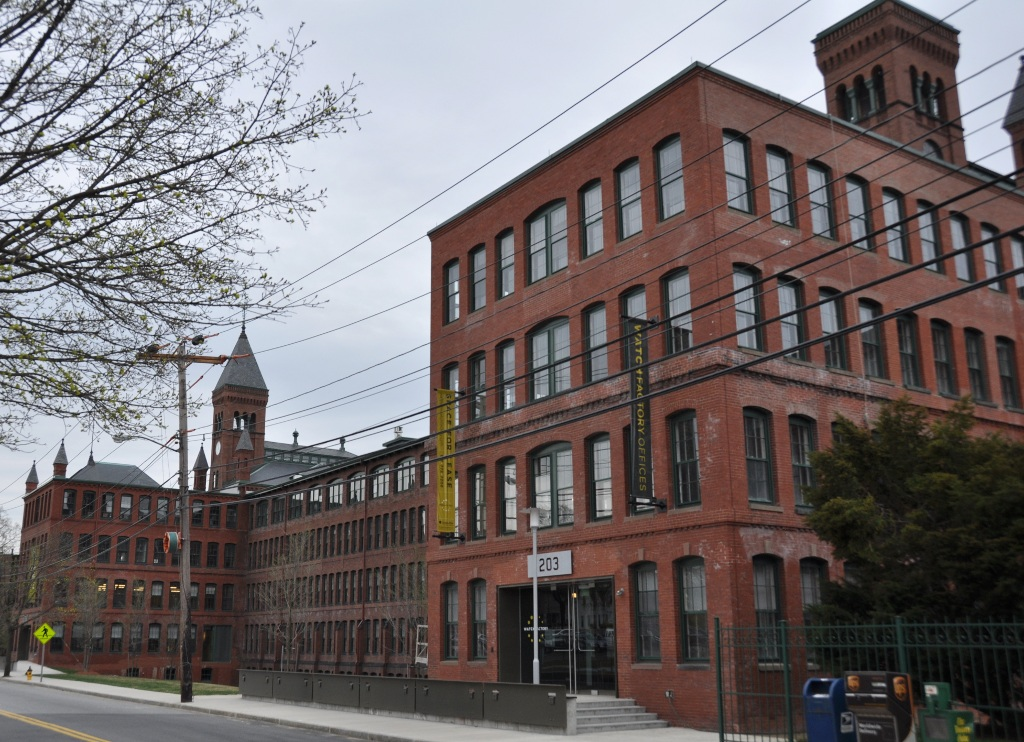

- Location within Massachusetts Location within the United States
- Location: 185-241 Crescent St., Waltham, Massachusetts
- Coordinates: 42°22′1″N 71°14′39″W
- Area: 8.2 acres (3.3 ha)
- Architectural style: Queen Anne, Romanesque
- MPS: Waltham MRA
- NRHP reference No.: 89001501
- Added to NRHP: September 28, 1989

The American Waltham Watch Company Historic District encompasses the former factory of the Waltham Watch Company, the leading American watch manufacturer of the 19th century and the city's largest employer. Located on Crescent Street and the banks of the Charles River, the surviving elements of its manufacturing facility date from the 1870s to the 1910s, and include particularly fine industrial Romanesque architecture. The buildings have been converted to a variety of commercial, industrial and residential uses since they ceased being used for watchmaking in the 1950s. The complex was listed on the National Register of Historic Places in 1989.

== Description and history ==
The Waltham Watch factory complex is located southwest of downtown Waltham, in South Waltham. It occupies about 8 acres (3.2 ha) on the south bank of the Charles River, bounded on the north by Prospect Street, the east by Crescent Street, and the south by wood-frame residential and commercial properties. Its buildings extend for nearly 1,000 feet (300 m), with four above-ground floors and a basement level. Built out of red brick, the facades are dominated by rows of large sash windows set in segmented-arch openings. The complex has several different roof treatments, as well as several towers, turrets, and corner finials, giving it a remarkably unified Romanesque appearance.

The earliest incarnation of the Waltham Watch Company was founded on this site in 1854, and demonstrated the complete creation of a watch under a single roof. The company went through a number of management and ownership changes, and was known as the American Waltham Watch Company when the first buildings of this facility were constructed beginning in 1879, when some of the first buildings were demolished. They were lauded at the time as model facilities, dedicated to the safety and hygiene of the workers, and included amenities such as daycare facilities that were unusual for the time. Major modifications to the plant ended in 1913, and the plant was shut down about 1962, after a series of financial difficulties and ownership changes.

Following the demise of watch manufacturing, the complex was leased out in portions to light manufacturing industries. Panametrics, a manufacturer of precision equipment, occupied much of the premises until its acquisition in 2004 by General Electric. The complex has since then undergone an environmentally friendly conversion to mixed residential and commercial/industrial use.

== See also ==
- National Register of Historic Places listings in Waltham, Massachusetts
