= Henry Pitkin =

American silversmith and watchmaker (1811–1846)

- Born: 2 January 1811; Hartford, Connecticut
- Died: 18 September 1846 (aged 35)
- Resting place: Hartford, Connecticut
- Occupation: silversmith / watchmaker
- Known for: American watchmaker
- Partner(s): Maria Kingsbury Goodwin married 29 June 1837
- Children: Maria Goodwin, b. 2 April 1838
- Parent: Captain John Pitkin / Olive Forbes

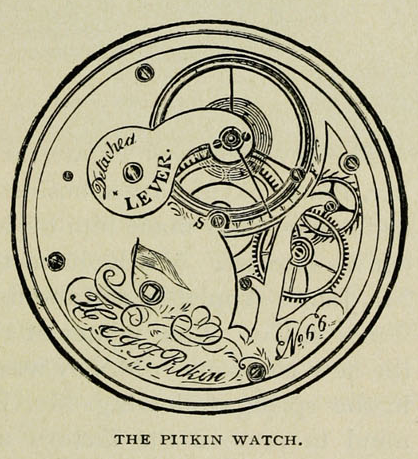

Henry Pitkin (2 January 1811 – 18 September 1846) was a silversmith and watchmaker of Hartford, Connecticut.

== Life ==
Pitkin, with his brothers John, Walter, and James had a successful jewelry manufacturing business in Hartford, Connecticut. The Pitkins were known to have outstanding mechanical ability. Pitkin and his two older brothers, John and Walter, had been apprenticed as silversmiths and watch repairmen, probably under Jacob Sargeant of Hartford. However, due to the depression following the Panic of 1837, they eventually closed their jewelry business in the later part of the 1830s.

The Pitkin brothers were already developing a watch they hoped could be successfully mass-produced via partial automation of the process. Pitkin came up with the idea of making pocket watches by mass production methods using mechanical manufacturing equipment. Pitkin with his brothers designed and built the machine apparatuses themselves for their automation of pocket watch manufacture. Pitkin was the inventor of the American lever watch movement for pocket watches.

Mass production of Pitkin watches began in 1836. Pitkin with his brother designed the first American pocket watches containing the first American machine-made parts. The Pitkin Watch Company was the first to mass-produce pocket watches in America. Pitkin's pocket watches had an excellent reputation for being accurate and durable. The plates for the Pitkins pocket watches were punched out with stamping dies but many times had to be finished to close tolerances by hand. The movements were three-quarter plate, slow train, and about the diameter of the modern 16-size pocket watch. The watchcases they made themselves from gold and silver. They imported from Europe many of the dials, hands, hairsprings and balance jewels needed for their watches, even though they tried to avoid using foreign-made parts. Pitkin named the first fifty movements after himself, however after that the name H & J. F. Pitkin was used. They did not engrave the place of their production shop on their watches, however the words Detached Lever were put on the balance bridge. Pitkin and his brother made about 800 watches between 1836 and 1841.

There were cheaper imported watches made by the Swiss so they struggled to keep the business afloat. In 1841 the company moved to New York in hopes for a better market. The cost to manufacture the movements was too great to compete with the Swiss watches and other imports. In 1846 Pitkin had a nervous breakdown and committed suicide. His brother James died a few years later. An employee of the Pitkin brothers by the name of Amariah Hells continued the business until 1852. Pitkin started the trend of making pocket watches of mass production by automation.
