= Waltham Watch Company =

American watchmaker

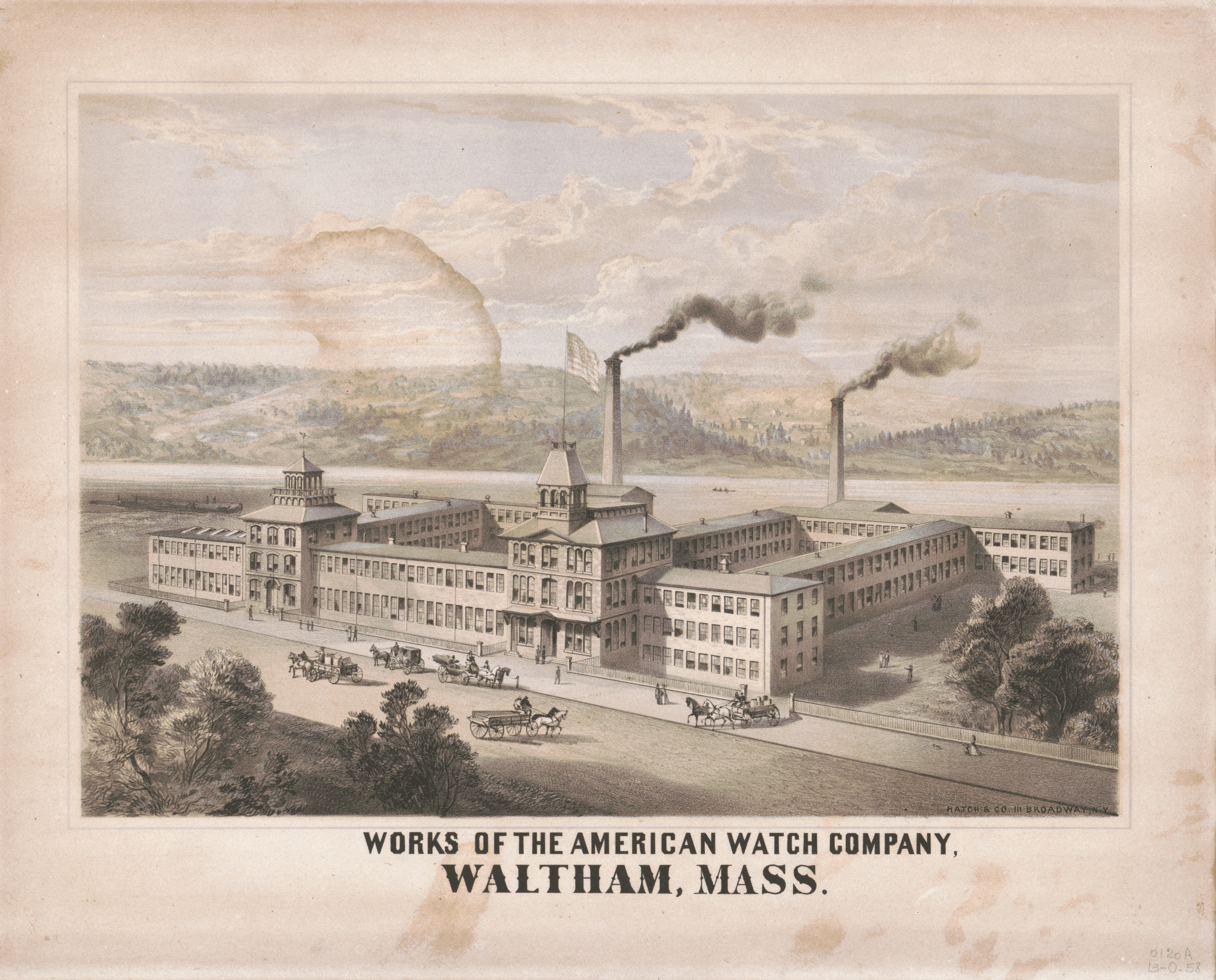
- Industry: Watchmaking and Clockmaking
- Founded: 1850
- Founder: Aaron Lufkin Dennison
- Headquarters: Waltham, Massachusetts, U.S.
- Products: Watches, clocks, aircraft clocks

The Waltham Watch Company, also known as the American Waltham Watch Co. and the American Watch Co., was a company that produced about 40 million watches, clocks, speedometers, compasses, time delay fuses, and other precision instruments in the United States of America between 1850 and 1957. The company's historic 19th-century manufacturing facilities in Waltham, Massachusetts, have been preserved as the American Waltham Watch Company Historic District.

The company went through a series of bankruptcies and restarts under new ownership, with watches and clocks bearing the Waltham name still being made and marketed as of September 2025.

== History ==
=== The early years, 1849 to 1857 ===
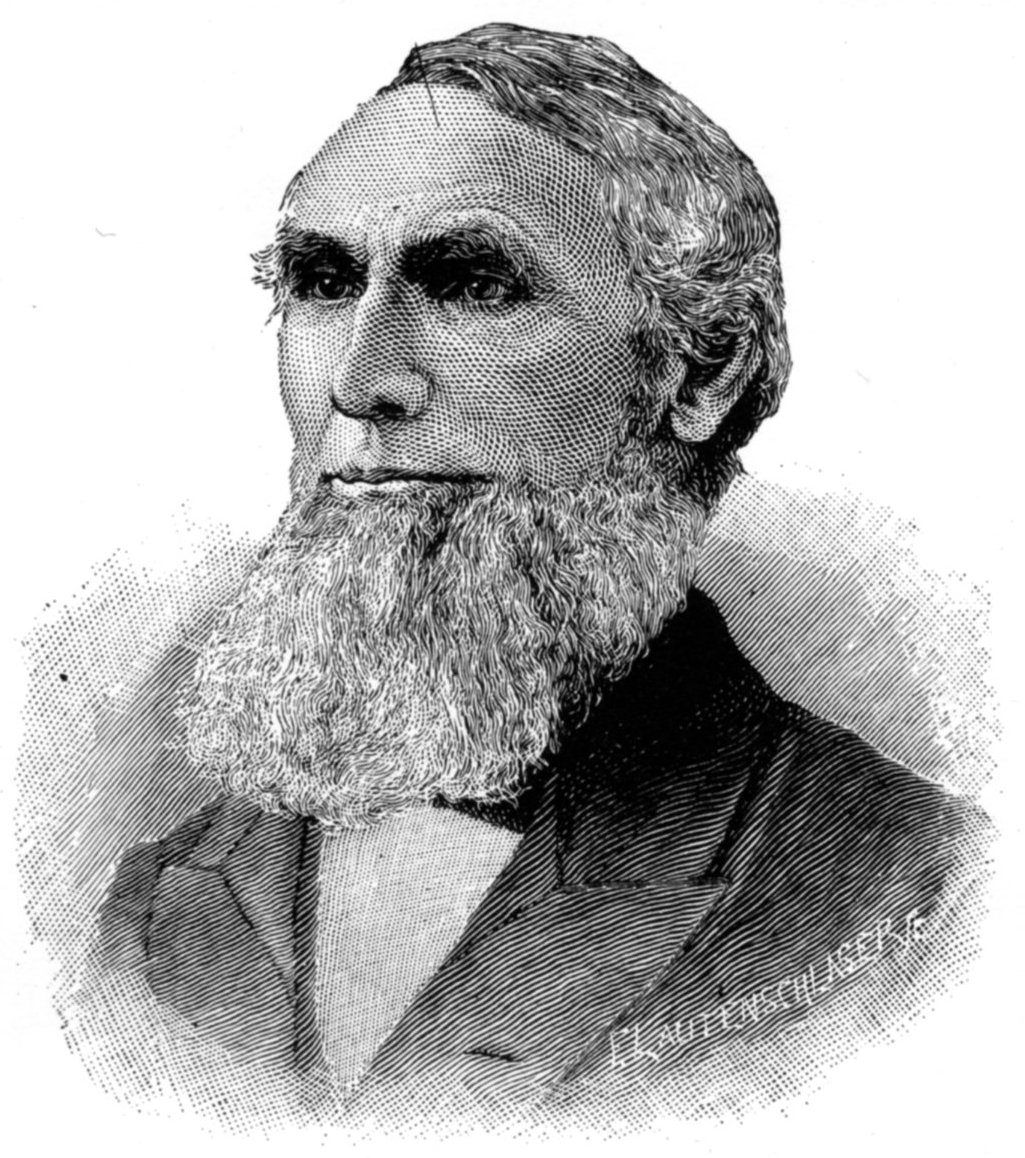
Aaron Lufkin Dennison, founder of the Waltham Watch Company.

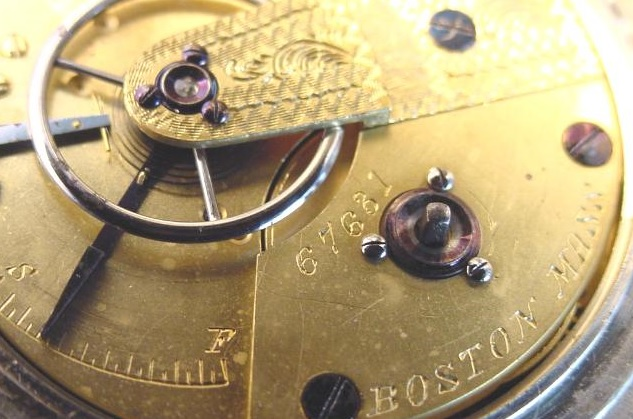
Picture of the Ellery Model 1857, produced when Waltham was still named Boston Watch Company.

Prior to 1850, watches in America were generally supplied either from England or Switzerland. The idea for the Waltham Watch Company came from watchmaker Aaron Lufkin Dennison. Dennison was the son of a shoemaker, born in Maine in 1812. He served as an apprentice to a jeweler for three years as a youth and had come to Boston in 1833. In 1833 he became a journeyman watchmaker with the firm of Currier & Trott in Boston, leaving in 1839 to go into business for himself.

Mass production of clocks had come on line during the first quarter of the 19th century in the United States, moving from a handicraft to a factory basis; the forward-thinking Dennison hoped to apply the same principles and techniques to the making of pocket watches. This would not be his first venture, however. In 1844 Dennison started the firm that would later emerge as the Dennison Manufacturing Company, a paper box business. He found this enterprise distracted him from his dream of industrial production of watches and turned the company over to brother Eliphalet Dennison in 1849 so that he could turn his full attention to horology.

In 1849, Dennison approached Edward Howard, a clock and scale maker from Boston. Howard initially wanted to build locomotives but instead went into business with Dennison making watches. Joining Dennison and Howard in establishment of the company were fellow Bostonians David P. Davis, experienced in manufacturing, and financial angel Samuel Curtis. Initial funding of $20,000 was raised and the American Horologe Company was born. The name was quickly changed to Warren Manufacturing

Dennison, paid $1,200 a year to head the project, was sent to Great Britain by his partners to learn trade secrets and purchase supplies for the American effort. Dennison observed that the watch industry in England was not highly mechanized and believed the new American firm by he and his partners could make an impact in the watch industry.

The company began with construction of a 100-foot long brick building on land in Roxbury, Massachusetts already owned by partners Howard and Davis. Specialized machinery was designed and the flow of daily operations perfected. "The firm attracted an able staff well versed in the field of watchmaking and willing to experiment with new methods," one historian of the firm later observed. Both Swiss and American watchmakers were employed.

The company's first offering, an innovative model which ran for eight days without winding, was a commercial failure, being too expensive to make economically, with about 19 pieces produced. A second, more conventional model with a 36-hour power reserve was put into production and met with success in the marketplace.

In 1853 the name of the company was changed to the Boston Watch Company.

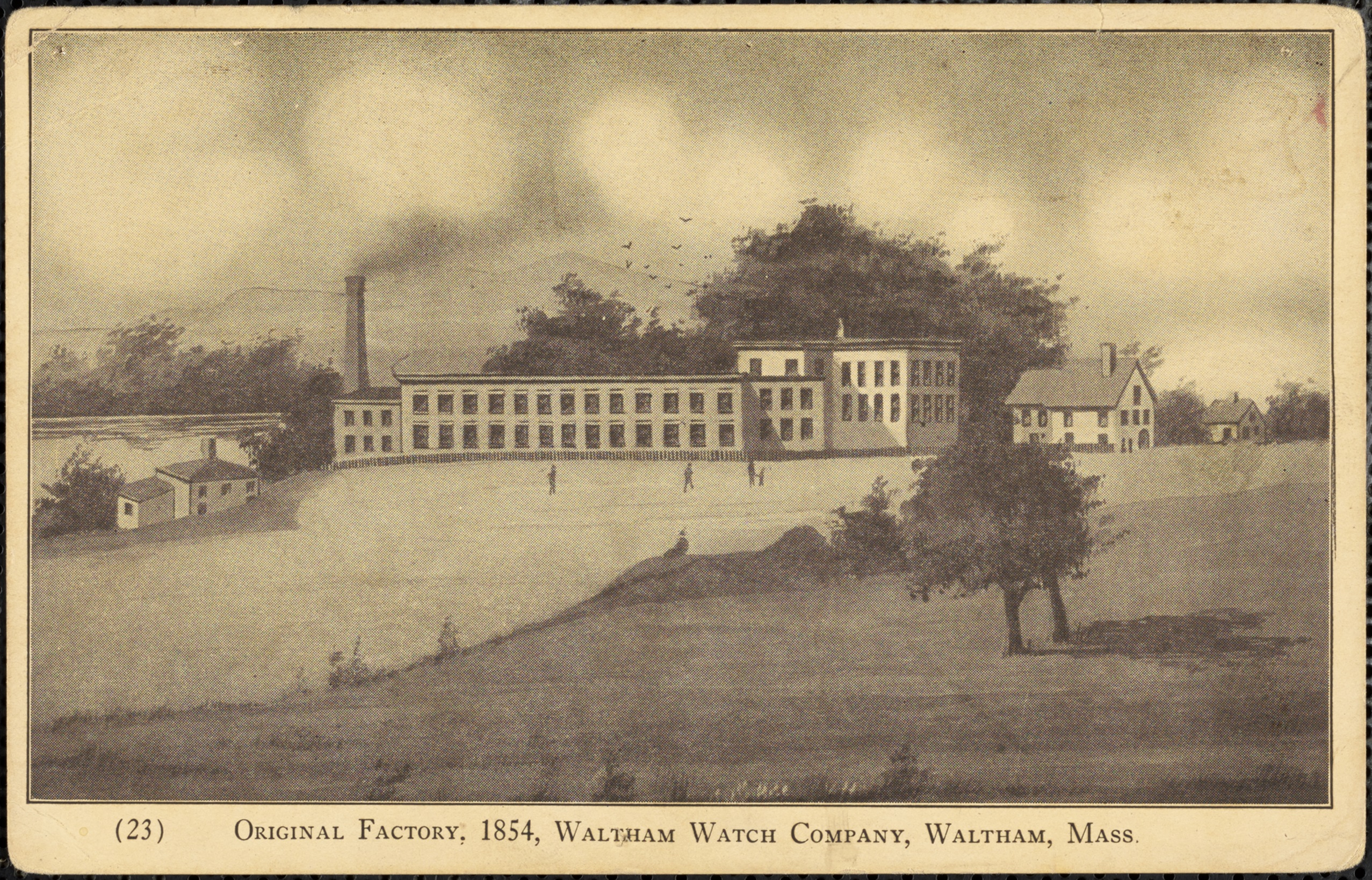
Original factory, 1854, Waltham Watch Company, Waltham, Mass.

The Roxbury factory was soon deemed to be too small for efficient mass production. Dennison sought a rural locale for the new facility and the town of Waltham, Massachusetts was chosen. Local residents contributed funds for land and improvements through a development company established by Dennison, the Waltham Improvement Company. One hundred acres of land were purchased and a building constructed, with operations commencing in 1854. There were 90 workers at the factory at the time of its inception, with total output of 30 watches per week.

The economics of production on this scale proved untenable. To cover the deficit in watch company operations in 1856 $6,000 in notes guaranteed by the Waltham Improvement Company were issued. The situation further deteriorated with the coming of an economic crisis in the third quarter of 1856. As the economy stalled, Waltham's watch sales plummeted. The partners contributed their personal savings in an effort to save the company, with an additional $20,000 raised by selling exclusive selling rights to Waltham watches to a large wholesale jeweler in New York City. This effort was insufficient and at the end of February 1857 the Waltham Improvement Company foreclosed on the mortgage it held for the Waltham factory. Assets were distributed in a sheriff's auction, with the Waltham property purchased by Royal E. Robbins for $56,000.

Although founder Dennison remained as superintendent of the Waltham facility until 1862, the initial phase of the Waltham Watch Company had come to an end.

=== The Civil War period, 1857 to 1865 ===
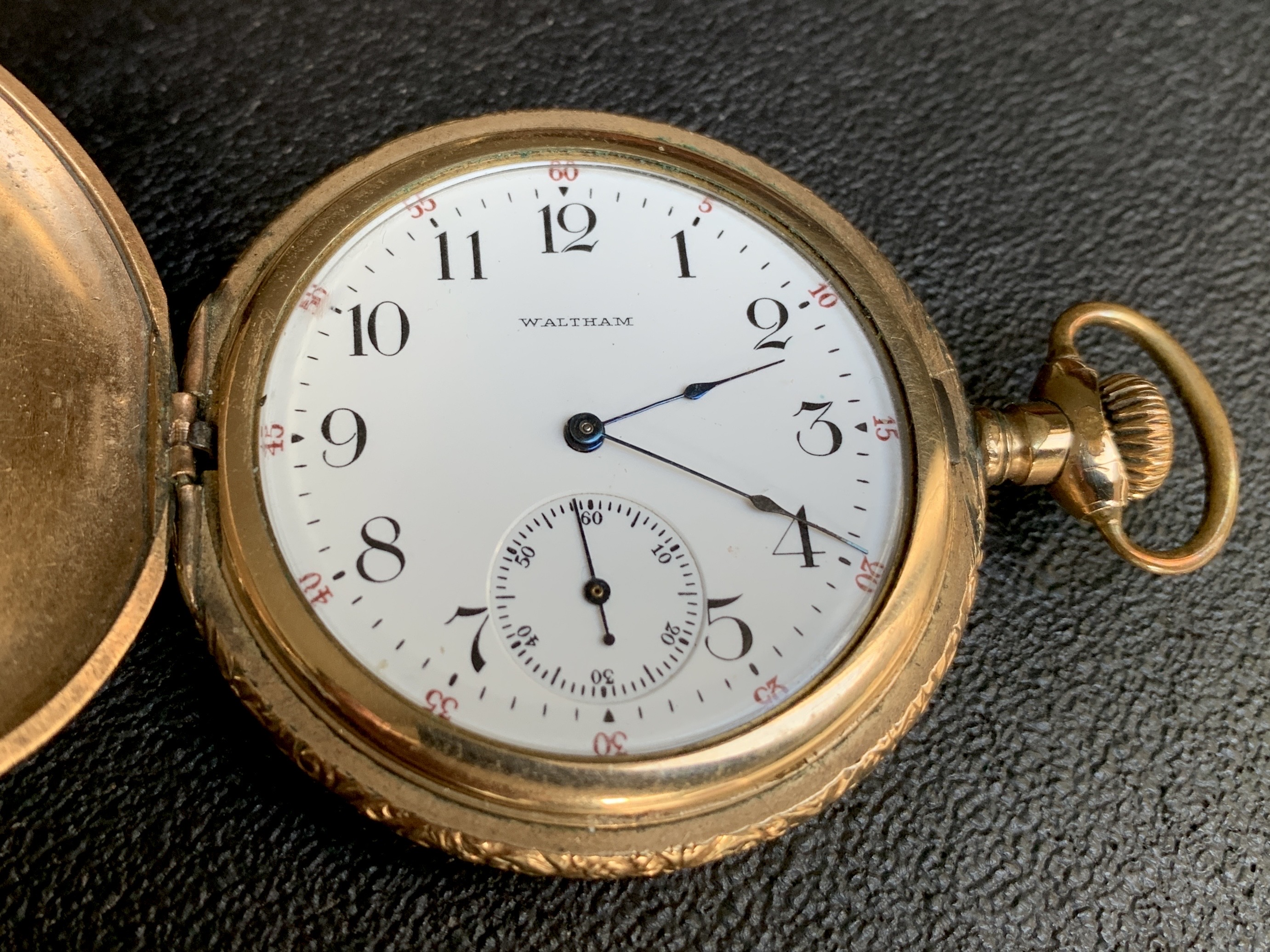
A 1903 Waltham Riverside pocket watch

New owner Royal Robbins was an experienced New York watch importer who worked a partnership with his brother Henry Asher Robbins and Daniel F. Appleton in an effort to make the Waltham Watch operation a success. All three members of this troika had extensive experience in the watch sales and the jewelry trade. Administration of the company was measured and prudent and the economic crisis of 1857 was survived.

With the coming of the American Civil War in 1861, the demand for watches expanded markedly, with soldiers in particular eager to obtain a reasonably priced timepiece for their personal use. To meet this demand, Waltham Watch unveiled a comparatively inexpensive $13 model called the "William Ellery." This watch was a "fad" among Union soldiers and sales blossomed. By the end of the Civil War the Ellery represented fully 45 percent of Waltham's annual sales.

=== The Period of Growth, 1866 to 1906 ===
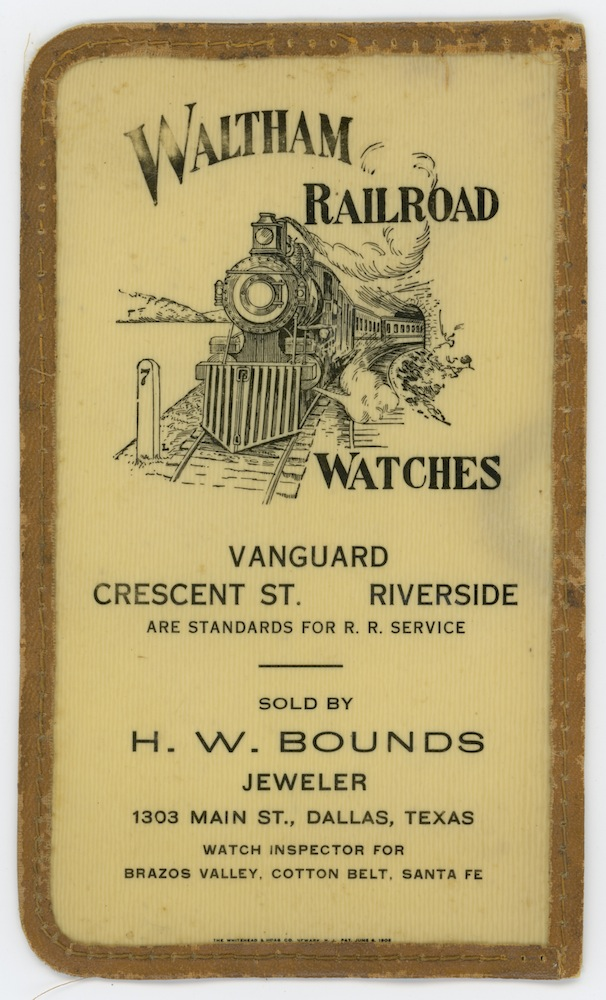
Waltham railroad watches flyer.

After the Civil War, the company became the main supplier of railroad chronometers to various railroads in North America and other countries. In 1876, the company showed off the first automatic screw making machinery and was awarded the first gold medal in a watch precision contest at the Philadelphia Centennial Exposition.

In 1885, the company name changed to the American Waltham Watch Company (AWWCo).

=== Decline, diversification, and restructuring, 1907 to 1922 ===
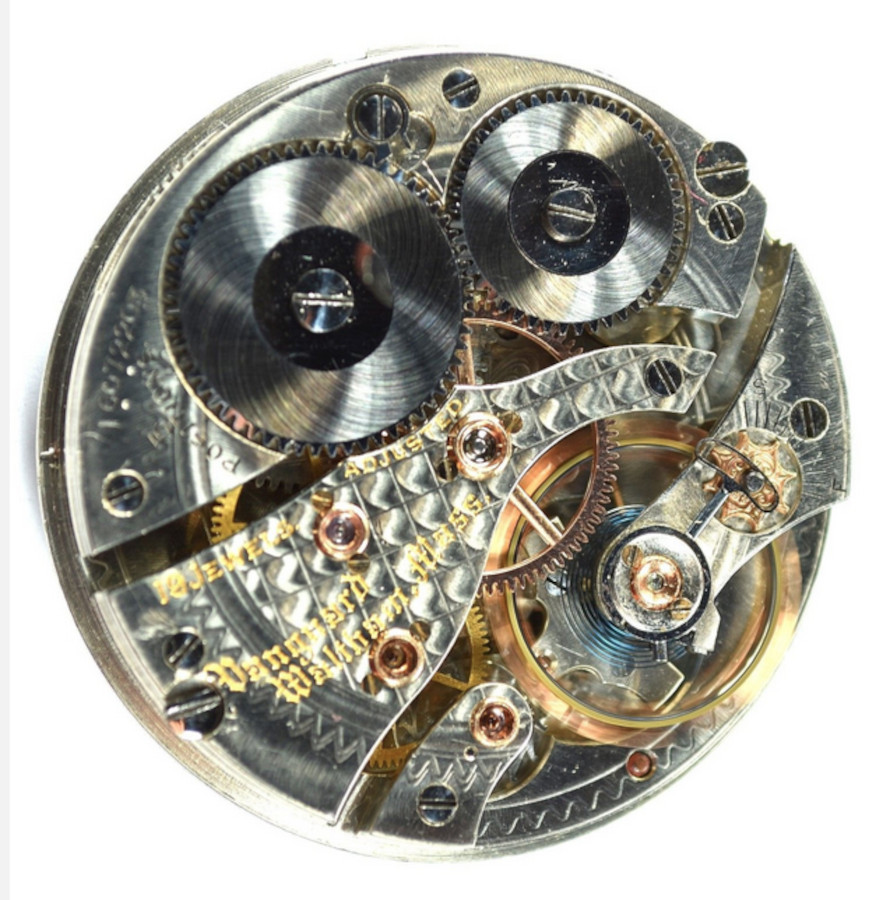
Waltham was known for its production of elaborately decorated, premium-priced pocket watch movements. This specimen of its "Vanguard" movement was manufactured in 1907.

Waltham's profitability was greatly impacted by the Panic of 1907, which brought a rapid fall of sales and earnings. This downturn not only did not abate but actually accelerated in 1908 and 1909, leading the sons of Royal Robbins to liquidate their holdings in the company as quietly as possible, with the brothers selling nearly all of the Waltham stock which they had inherited from their father. Stockholders became aggrieved by the company's flagging fortunes and voted to terminate an existing sales relationship with the company Robbins & Appleton, an independently owned wholesale arm which contracted to dispose of the entire output of Waltham on a 6% commission. Four longtime members of the company's board of directors resigned and new directors appointed.

Board member Augustus P. Loring became the effective leader of Waltham's majority shareholders in 1910. In an economizing measure a vice-presidential position was cut and executive pay generally reduced by the new board majority. A further effort was made to infuse new blood into Waltham's management corps in an effort to break up a privileged and lethargic executive bureaucracy, although this change was met with only limited success.

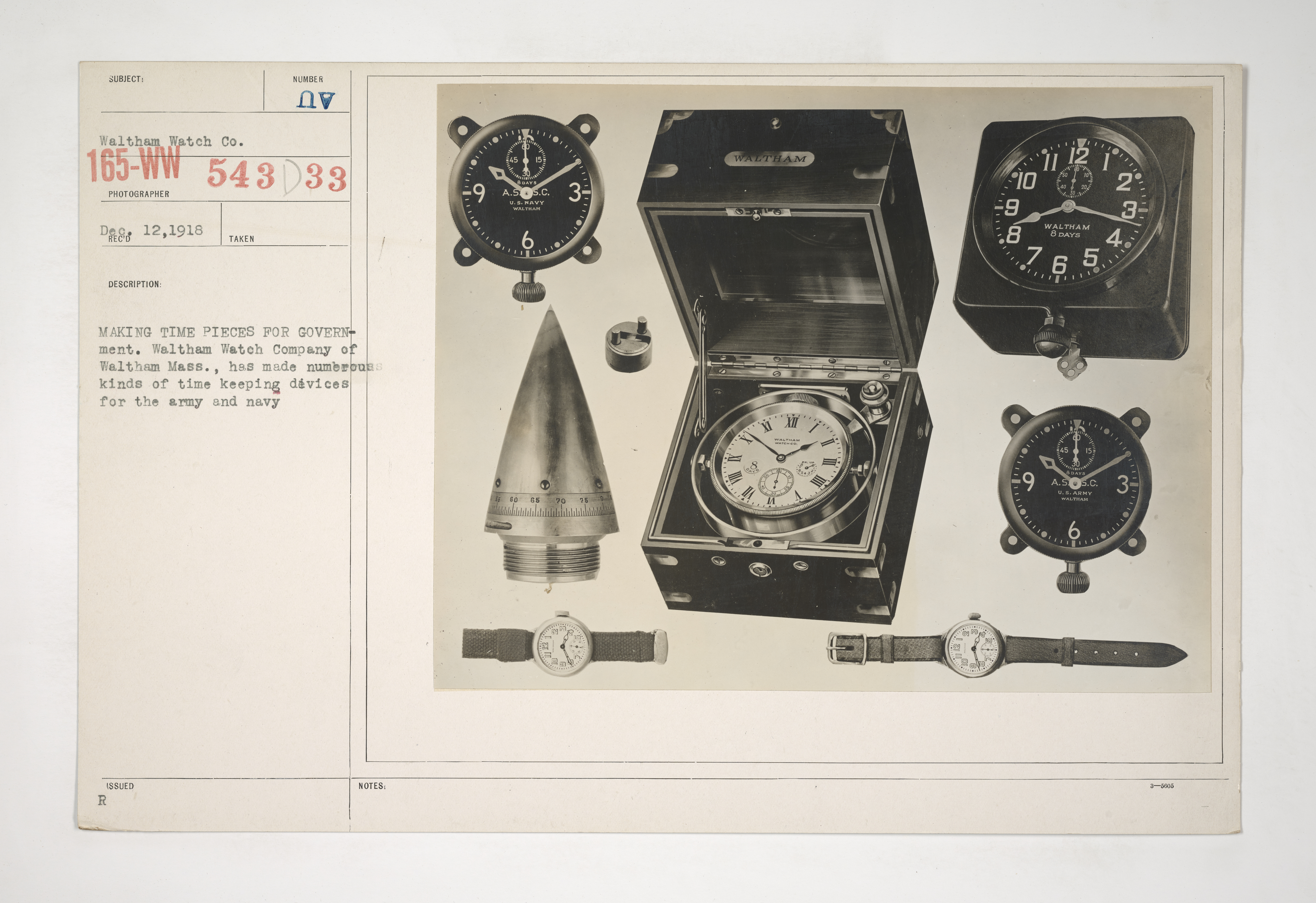
Waltham products for World War I

The company attempted to diversify its output. Seeing a great demand in Europe as a result of the outbreak of World War I, Waltham introduced production of mechanized time fuses to control the burst of artillery shells in 1915, as well as automobile speedometers in 1916 and blood pressure gauges in 1917. Wholesale sales were taken in-house rather than being contracted out.

Waltham found itself pouring time and effort into the task of developing and improving a timing device which could absorb the shock of being fired from heavy artillery and its ability to design and manufacture conventional timepieces consequently suffered. By 1917 the American economy was booming, demand for watches was high, but Waltham was operating at full capacity, with the United States War Department calling for increased production of artillery fuses. Other American watchmakers were content limiting themselves to production of ordinary chronometers; with no experience making artillery fuses, contracts and production fell overwhelmingly upon Waltham's shoulders.

In the short term, Waltham prospered through its emphasis on military contracts, with sales nearly doubling between 1915 and 1918 and earnings soaring by 156%. However the easy money of military contracts papered over what one historian has characterized as an era of "wanton extravagance, gross inefficiency, and a marked lack of business foresight." With the end of the war came the Depression of 1920–1921, drying up military and consumer sales alike.

Waltham was a bloated behemoth, divided into watertight departments operated with a minimal eye to coordination and cooperation. A panel of consultants employed by management were shocked to discover 25 rival departments within the company, with "each foreman operating his department as though it were a plant in itself," determining its own production and hiring its own personnel. The company was massively overstaffed, with the consulting engineers indicating that 4,000 people were currently employed to do the work that 2,000 efficiently used workers were capable of achieving. Unsold inventory ballooned to $11 million, while the company racked up $8 million in debt, while being forced to pay dividends on a substantial quantity of stock.

With the coming of price deflation in 1921, banks tightened their credit policies. Lending banks came to realize that Waltham's loans were not adequately covered by current assets. Information about Waltham's inefficient model of organization also undermined lender confidence. Waltham's external financiers worried that shutting off credit entirely might force Waltham into liquidation and default upon their original loans. A period of negotiation was begun, in which lenders successfully demanded that Waltham's management be brought under their own direct control.

Regarding Waltham's management as incompetent, the First National Bank of Boston and other creditors took effective control of the company late in 1921, selecting one of their own directors, Gifford K. Simonds of Fitchburg, Massachusetts as new chief executive officer. The manager of a mid-sized family-owned sawmill for a decade, Simonds threw himself into learning the watch business, visiting every part of the plant and working three months behind a retail counter to learn about consumer preferences and expectations.

Fighting for freedom of action against entrenched interest groups, including bankers, stockholders, managers, and workers, Simonds sought to instill discipline, speed up the production process, and lay off superfluous workers, cutting payroll by 1,000. He believed that unsold inventory was severely overvalued on the company's books, leading to a write-down assets by $3 million and a dumping unsold inventory on the market. Cutting benefits and speeding up production norms, Simonds managed to reduce the production cost by 25% and to eliminate $800,000 of the company's debt by January 1923. This proved insufficient for troubled lenders, however, and in February 1923 creditors had found a new underwriter and Simonds' brief tenure drew to a close.

=== The wristwatch era, 1923 to 1940 ===
Waltham was reorganized in 1923 by a syndicate headed by the investment firm of Kidder, Peabody & Co. Kidder, Peabody drove a hard bargain, forcing through a two-tiered financial overhaul in which large investors able to contribute new money for the purchase of preferred stock were able to convert old common stock for newly issued common stock at the rate of 10 shares for 9. These monied investors were also able to convert their old interest-bearing preferred stock to new at the rate of 10 shares for 8. Small investors unable to contribute new money were treated far less favorably, however, being forced to accept an exchange of old stock for new at the rate of 10 shares for 2.5 — thereby losing 75% of their equity in one fell swoop. Financial institutions and large investors thus saw their stake in the reorganized firm protected, while small investors absorbed the brunt of the inevitable write-down of company value.

Kidder-Peabody benefited handsomely as underwriter of securities and investor in preferred stock, realizing nearly $2.5 million in profit, dividends, and capital gain from the sale of stock over the 1923–28 period.

A charismatic new chief executive came in as part of the restructuring, Frederic Dumaine, who arrived at Waltham to lead the new regime in February 1923. The former "gargantuan collection of small workshops" was integrated, and production steered towards more marketable products. Company debt was paid down. This restructuring proved profitable, and the price of Waltham stock subsequently advanced impressively, easing the company's credit burden.

The restructured company of 1923 began its run on the precipice of disaster. A fairly vast part of unsold inventory took the form of partially completed timepieces, a substantial part of which could not be readily disposed of except as scrap. Foremen had kept their departments running at full capacity regardless of actual demand for the components produced, resulting in gluts of jewels, lubricating oil, steel, and brass, while other components remained in short supply. Some items were overproduced to such great extent that available stocks were projected to last for 20 years or more.

Moreover, Waltham was slow to adapt to the desires of a changing marketplace, with postwar consumers demanding an overwhelming proportion of small wristwatches, for which Waltham lacked stylistic prowess or physical machinery. The company remained geared towards the production of high-grade pocket watches. Competition had made itself felt, with rivals Elgin and Hamilton increasing their capitalization and modernizing their plant, while imports from Switzerland increased nearly 500% between 1913 and 1920. Economic recovery in 1922 had left Waltham behind, with fully two-thirds of the plant left idle.

Dumaine's efforts at rationalization of Waltham began with a reduction of executive salaries, which had topped $100,000 a year for top level executives in the previous period. Private secretaries were eliminated and a smaller secretarial office pool established instead. No general reduction of salaries was attempted for office and factory workers but total payroll was nonetheless reduced through layoffs and reorganization, with an eye to streamlining the company's inefficient planning and billing bureaucracy.

In the words of one study of the company's business management practices:

"The saving in money — about a thousand dollars a day — was important, but the effect on methods and morale was of greater consequence. This initial campaign demonstrated at once, and for all time, that direct and simple methods would be used; also that every employee must earn his wages, not merely in effort expended, but also in results accomplished.

Most importantly, Dumaine changed the company's course from the production of the elegantly crafted pocket watches for which it was known — a form increasingly out of favor with post-war consumers — towards the manufacture of smaller and fresher wristwatches designed for a mass market at a lower price-point. This change had come with significant risk, as Waltham had dominated the market for luxury pocket watches and faced a serious shortage of the designers and toolmakers needed to revamp and modernize its product line. There was even doubt whether American factory production could be adapted to take on the finely detailed and well crafted product produced by the Swiss at a lower average wage rate.

Dumaine also took aim at Waltham's pricing policy, which had previously varied with market conditions to achieve as high a price as possible. Waltham's products were consequently priced for between 15 and 25% more than equivalent products of rival companies when the new company regime took the helm in 1923. Still seeking the cachet of a top shelf price, Dumaine nevertheless immediately lowered the selling prices of the company's products to a point just 5% higher than the comparable goods of its domestic competitors. This proved to be a first step to true parity with the prices of the company's main American competitors, Elgin and Hamilton.

==== Watchmakers' Strike of 1924 ====
The company turned to a general wage cut of 10 to 40% to bolster profitability in 1924. This, unsurprisingly, proved unpopular with Waltham workers, 75 of whom in the Finishing department put down tools on August 11, 1924, over news of a forthcoming 10% wage cut. The spirit of militance spread and the next day, slated to be the first of the new wage scale, fully 200 workers from the Finishing and Setting-Up departments stayed home. Within three days the entire Waltham plant was embroiled in a company-wide work stoppage, the first in the more than 70-year history of the company.

As part of the strike, former department-level worker organization within Waltham was abandoned and a new organization called the Watchmakers Protective Association established. Affiliation of this new company-wide union with the American Federation of Labor was anticipated.

Plant superintendent I.E. Boucher refused to meet with organized workers in connection with the strike, only individuals, further exacerbating the conflict. Moreover, Boucher declared that striking workers would be no longer considered employees of Waltham and that each must individually apply for reemployment through the company's employment office. On the third day, other departments shut down over the company's unilateral wage cut, with 2,000 of Waltham's 2,900 total employees hitting the street over the reduction. A parade estimated at 2,000 people, including some workers with 50 years of company service, marched through the streets of Waltham to a rally held at the city park. The only department which remained in operation after the third day was the Machine department, whose employees were members of a separate AF of L-affiliated union and who were awaiting approval of their national organization to join the work stoppage. Packing clerks and stenographers joined the strike in sympathy during the second week, effectively halting operations of the Waltham plant.

As August ended the two sides remained deadlocked over the wage scale. More mobile workers began to leave the city, going to Elgin, Illinois or Lancaster, Pennsylvania to seek employment with Waltham's chief domestic competitors.

In September a union proposal accepting wage reductions for men making more than $40 a week or women making more than $20 — thereby exempting the lowest paid workers from the cutback. Company acceptance was expected and a celebratory was held on Saturday, September 27. When news came of the company's rejection of the compromise proposal, in favor of a counteroffer of a general 7.5% wage cut, the party turned into a riot, with a mob of thousands storming the company's gates. Police intervention broke up the melee in the wee hours of Sunday morning.

The rejection of the compromise proposal marked a turning point in the strike, as strikers became more aggressive towards strikebreakers who crossed their picket lines, hurling abuse and stones and waving yellow handkerchiefs at the defectors. Vacations were canceled for the Waltham police force and police presence was increased in the aftermath of the threatened violence.

The strike continued into October, when the Massachusetts State Board of Conciliation, after a lengthy fact-finding process, proposed a 5% wage cut as justified for all workers earning more than $18 a week. This proposal satisfied no one, with Waltham management politely refusing to move off their proposal for a general reduction of 10% and strikers holding a mass meeting which lent no support to the board's report.

The company was able to maintain operations through the use of strikebreakers, primarily new hires and the strike continued through the end of 1924.

=== World War II and after, 1941–1955 ===
During World War II Waltham converted its Massachusetts factory from consumer goods to military production. The company made pocket compasses such as these for officers in the US Army.

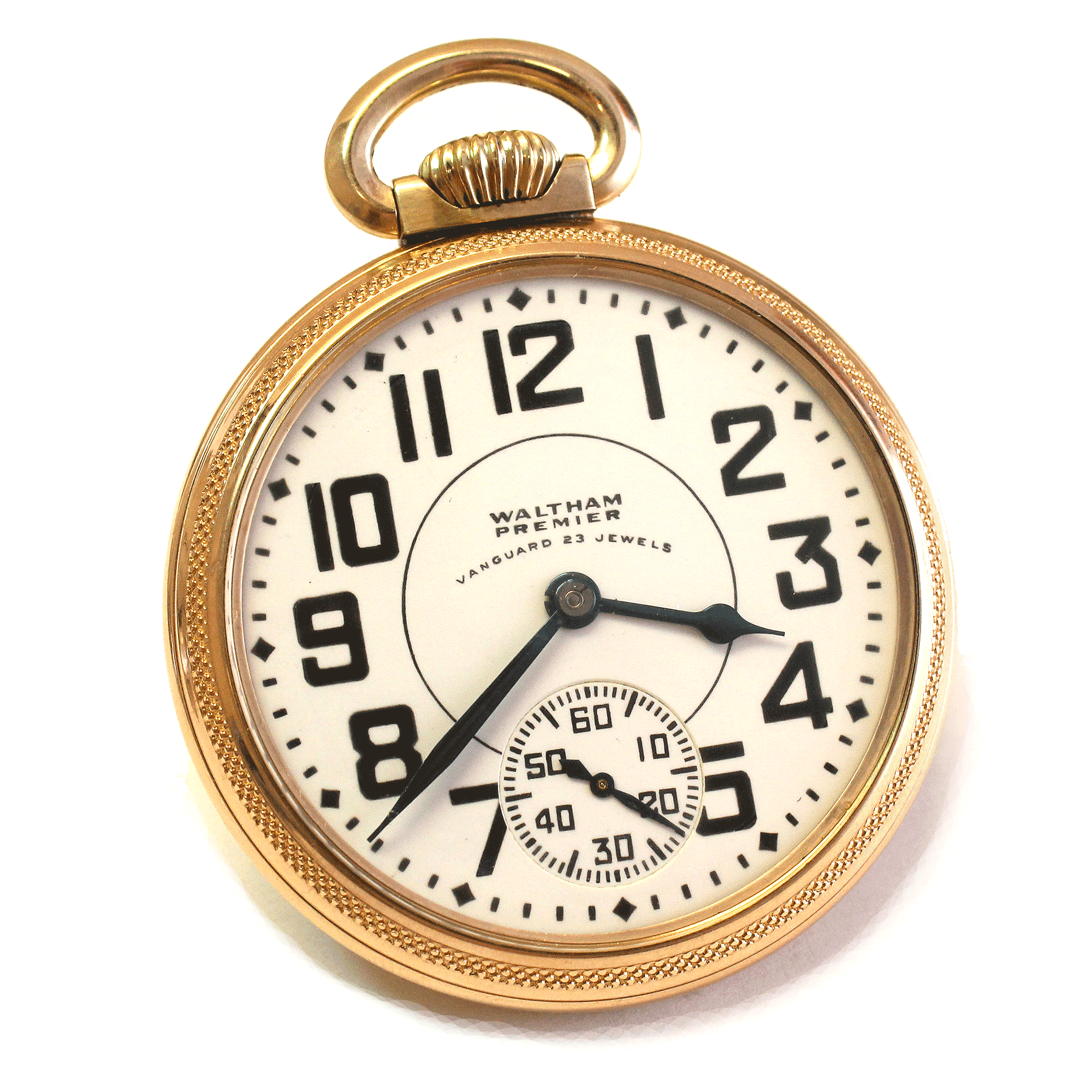
WALTHAM Premier pocket watch Vanguard Model 1908 16s 23j 10k Gold Filled circa 1943 Made in USA

During World War II Waltham was an important contractor for the American military, producing timepieces for service personnel and timing devices for military ordinance, such as bombs and torpedoes, with the company's Waltham, Massachusetts factory wholly converted to military production.

The post-war years were not kind to Waltham, however. A $211,200 net profit in 1945 flipped into a massive $411,400 loss in 1946, ushering in a series of years in which the company generated red ink. A flood on the American market of inexpensive Swiss-produced timepieces was blamed for the company's dire economic straits.

The company closed its factory doors and declared bankruptcy in 1949, a crisis was triggered when the final $2 million installment of a promised $6 million loan by the Reconstruction Finance Corporation was denied by the lender. Waltham's historic Massachusetts facility was shuttered on February 3, 1950, putting 1,200 workers out of a job.

Through the aid of bankruptcy court, in September 1950 a trustee was named to oversee the limited restart of the Waltham facility to complete the manufacture of 242,000 watches for the Christmas selling season. About 250 employees were brought back to the factory for the finishing, regulation, and shipping of these partially completed timepieces. This partial restart for completion and sale of partially completed inventory proved successful, enabling the company's trustees to repay $2 million — half of the $4 million borrowed in the fall of 1949 — to the Reconstruction Finance Corporation.

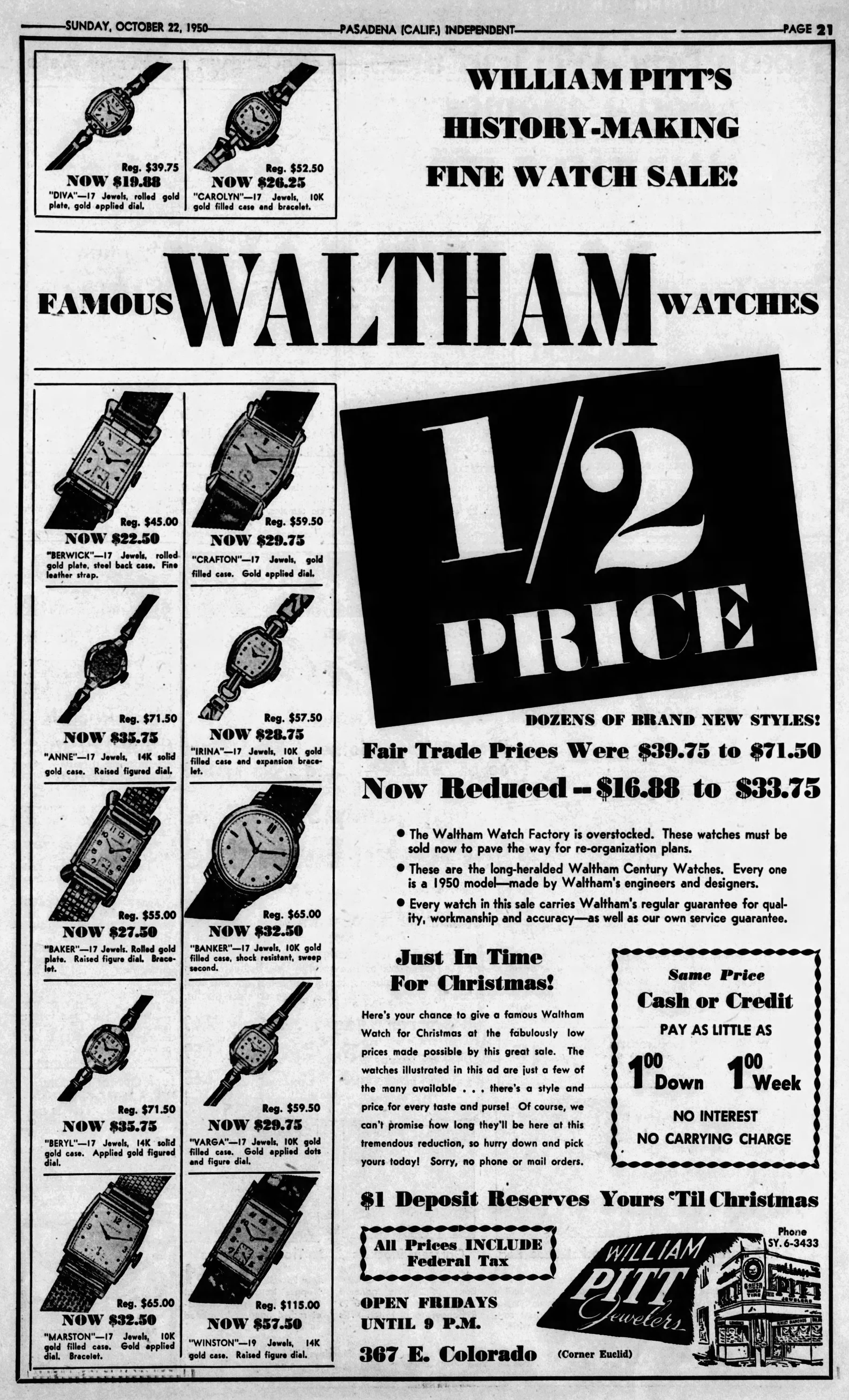
Full page ad touting Waltham Watches finished in 1950 under supervision of federal bankruptcy court.

Another $250,000 was repaid toward the company's indebtedness by the first of May 1951. In addition, company trustees managed to negotiate several contracts for defense work with prospects for more, leading federal bankruptcy judge George C. Sweeney to approve the company's reorganization plan.

"An examination of the balance sheet satisfies me that with careful management the company will be able to function safely and satisfactorily," Judge Sweeney noted.

Sweeney's assessment proved correct, with the Waltham Watch Company squeaking out a profit of $11,728 in 1951 — the first financially positive year since the end of World War II. This compared most positively with the company's performance in 1950, in which a loss of $430,000 was declared. This trend continued in 1952, with sales of $2.3 million generating a profit of nearly $73,000 during the first six months of that year. Not coincidentally, these were years of the Korean War, marked by expanded American military spending, which included both contracts for precision timing devices and wristwatches for soldiers.

The reorganized Waltham relaunched watch manufacturing, with some 700 people employed by the firm as of January 1, 1952, and 800 by that summer. In an effort to better balance supply and demand, the company terminated direct sales to stores on that date, returning to the pre-war policy of sales to authorized wholesalers. The challenges of the marketplace remained, however, with low cost watches from Switzerland flooding the market.

In March 1952 the reorganized Waltham surrendered to European manufacturing prowess, announcing that the company would itself begin the importation of complete watch movements from Switzerland. Trustees announced that it would be cheaper to import Swiss movements and pay the tariff on them than to produce the same mechanisms domestically. Waltham would subsequently merely apply dials to these mechanisms and insert the works into cases, it was stated. This decision was slammed by Walter Cenerazzo, head of the American Watch Union, who called for establishment of a "scientific tariff" offsetting the price differential between foreign and domestic manufacture.

Waltham's decision to begin importing and casing finished Swiss movements was not unique, with its chief American watch manufacturing competitors, Elgin and Hamilton, making the same business decision.

Waltham Watch continued to prosper in the changing market, with sales up 35% in the first half of 1953 compared to the previous year and employment at the Waltham facility back up to 1,000 people. This growth was not strictly limited to precision timing devices for the military; the company's main product, watches, had a sales increase of 30% over 1952.

By 1954, the American watch industry had seen its domestically produced wares fall from a 52% market share in 1940 to just 18%. A steep increase in the tariff on imported jeweled watches, increasing the rate to 50%, was passed. In addition to employment considerations, the steep 50% tax was justified on national security grounds, since the production of timing mechanisms for modern armaments made use of skills and techniques utilized in the vanishing watchmaking craft.

The hike of the tariff on imported jeweled watches did not ultimately shield Waltham from market forces, however. Amidst declining sales of watches to the military and a consumer market saturated with imported timepieces, Waltham saw its 1954 sales plummet by more than 35% from 1953's levels, with the company reporting a net loss of $210,000 to shareholders — reversing three years of profitable operations.

=== Interregnum, 1955 to 1957 ===
By now freed from court-controlled reorganization and seeing the writing on the wall, in July 1955 controlling interest in the Waltham Watch Company was reportedly sold to the Bellanca Aircraft Corporation of Los Angeles. The new suitor was attracted by Waltham's speedometer and instrument division and immediately declared their intention to dispose of the company's existing watch inventory and to spin off the watch manufacturing division.

Bellanca, a maker of airplanes from the 1920s, had subsequently evolved into a manufacturer of precision instruments, engine mounts, radar equipment, and plastic parts. The company had itself been the object of a takeover in February 1955 by S.L. Albert & Son, an Akron-based manufacturer of machinery used primarily in the rubber industry owned by financier Sydney Albert. This had been followed in May by Albert's acquisition of National Electronics Laboratories, Inc., of Washington, DC — a maker of aviation communications equipment. Albert also owned the Pierce Governor Company of Anderson, Indiana, manufacturer of automobile engine governors.

Boston newspaper columnist John Harriman was enthusiastic about the change, writing: "Waltham had become the marginal producer in the highly competitive watch field. It will now be thrown over entirely to electronics and precision instruments, our fastest growing industry in these parts, under management which has no apologies to make for its record."

Albert's acquisitions binge began to unravel in mid-1956, when the price of Bellanca stock dropped significantly. Albert had used stock in his various companies as collateral for loans to acquire new companies; federal regulations required that the value of stock held in collateral should equal 30% of the value of the loan, forcing the sale of stock when the value no longer met that benchmark. This put Waltham shares previously held by Albert back into circulation, making possible a new takeover.

Meanwhile, in May 1956 Waltham management named the Hallmark Watch Corporation of Chicago as the company's exclusive wholesale distributor to the trade. This arrangement would prove important in coming months as Waltham's precision instruments and watch divisions moved their separate ways.

In the Fall of 1956 a new management group headed by dynamic watch wholesaler Joseph Axler succeeded in obtaining 322,700 Waltham shares from a prominent broker, thereby gaining working control of the company. Signaling a move away from precision electronics products, the new managers promised to return Waltham "to its rightful place of leadership in the watch industry." Effective the first of 1957, Axler moved Waltham's executive offices to New York City, leaving the company's Massachusetts factory in operation making aircraft clocks, gyroscopes, and other electronic devices.

In July 1957 a move to splitting the company's electronics and watchmaking components was formalized when stockholders approved renaming as the Waltham Precision Instruments Company, with a subsidiary to be known as Waltham Watch Company of Delaware.

=== Waltham of Chicago, 1958 to 1967 ===
In January 1958 an agreement was finalized between the Axler-led Waltham Watch Co. and the Chicago-based Hallmark Watch Co. authorizing the latter to assemble watches from imported components under the Waltham name. This agreement was framed by Waltham as a "multi-million dollar royalty agreement." Waltham President Axler indicated that the company's Massachusetts facility would be used for the development and production of other products. The Waltham name was sold outright to Harold B. "Harry" Aronson, president of the Hallmark Watch Company, in the spring of the following year.

The officers of Hallmark took over similar positions in the newly reborn Waltham. The board consisted of Harold B. "Harry" Aronson (president), Ben Cole, and Morris Draft, all formerly officers of Hallmark. Chicago attorney Seymour Rady was a vice president and the company's chief counsel from 1957 until his death in December 1966. At the end of 1959 Aaron Thorne, a former Western regional sales manager for Benrus Watch Company was added as a vice president, working from an office in Los Angeles. Thorne supervised sales to the Western United States and Asia.

The new company moved its base of operations from Massachusetts to Chicago. An important change was made in the company's business model, with a move to franchised distributors who would pay about $1200 up front to the company in exchange for display cases and inventory to be placed in local drug stores, hardware stores, and appliance stores. Hundreds of newspaper ads were placed around the country to publicize the venture, which was headquartered in New York under the name Time Industries. Franchisees were to maintain inventory in these cases, splitting proceeds with the business owners in which the cases were placed. This change signified a new emphasis upon lower-end, more popularly priced products.

The new company also moved to license its well-known and respected name to others. In the fall of 1963 Waltham signed a licensing agreement with the Samson Company of Chicago to manufacture transistor radios and tape recorders bearing the Waltham logo.

Production of the complicated inner watch movements was moved out of the United States. Waltham opened a new factory in Neuchatel, Switzerland in the summer of 1962 designed to produce up to 100,000 watch movements per month.

The company came under much scrutiny by the Federal Trade Commission throughout the 1960s, accused of misrepresenting the number of jewels within its watches, pre-tagging merchandise with inflated prices bearing no connection to actual prices charged, and misrepresenting country of origin and connection of the new company to the previous Waltham Watch Co. It was forced to change its advertising and branding policies in response to these complaints.

Waltham was a very successful enterprise throughout its Chicago period with total sales jumping from about $10.5 Million in 1962 to $12.1 Million in 1963, and net income increasing by 70%. Improvement in efficiency and higher gross margins were credited for the up-tick in profitability. Sales and profits increased again in 1964, with total sales hitting the $13.3 Million mark and net income up another 35%.

Waltham emerged as a leading maker of dive watches, a segment which sold over 200,000 pieces in the United States in 1967. The company made a 5 bar hand-winding model priced at $50 and a deluxe version good to 300 feet for serious divers retailing for $120.

=== Sale to new Swiss ownership, 1968 to 1980 ===
In March 1968, Waltham President Harry Aronson announced that a Swiss group headed by the Invicta Watch Co. had agreed to in principle purchase Waltham, still a publicly held company whose shares were sold over the counter. A formal offer to buy shares of Waltham common stock at $16 per share was announced in September 1968. Purchaser was a Delaware-registered entity called Iseca, headed by Invicta Watch Company of La Chaux-de-Fonds, Switzerland, but also including H. Sandoz & Co. of La Chaux-de-Fonds, and Degoumois & Co. of Neuchatel, Switzerland. Iseca's purchase was of 283,976 shares, of which 151,819 were held by a group headed by company president Harry B. Aronson. Aronson was retained under terms of the deal as a consultant for six years at $30,000 per year. A total of just over $6.5 million cash were to be used in the acquisition, financed by sale of Iseca capital stock and a $3.9 million loan from the Union Bank of Switzerland. According to the published Sept. offer, "Iseca does not presently have any plan to liquidate Waltham, or to sell its assets to, or merge it with, any other persons, or to make any other major change in Waltham's business or corporate structure."

Management was changed with the purchase of Waltham by Invicta, with Georges Didisheim, president of Invicta Watch Co., named chairman and Morris Draft executive vice president in August 1968. The company remained headquartered in Chicago.

There are also some Waltham watch models that have been brought to Invicta. In those years Waltham started to produce a watch line, especially for Invicta. This was called “Invicta by Waltham”. In some cases, both Invicta and Waltham were on the dial. Other cases will only show a “W” to indicate that this watch was manufactured by Waltham for Invicta.

Later in the 1970s, Waltham was merged into a federation with other Swiss makers of inexpensive watches, the Société des Garde-Temps SA (SGT). Georges Didisheim remained chairman of the board of Waltham following this merger.

Concentrating on manufacturing watches for lower retail prices, sales blossomed, with quantity of watches sold doubling between 1968 and 1975, to a total of more than one million pieces annually. This made Waltham the third largest watchmaker in America by 1975, behind Timex and Bulova. Sales were sufficient to move to a new larger facility in Chicago, a 100,000 square foot building formerly owned by the American Can Company.

In January 1974, Société des Garde-Temps purchased rights to the name of the Elgin Watch Company, another storied American brand.

=== Waltham in the Quartz era, 1981 to date ===
As a result of the quartz crisis, SGT terminated operations in 1981. The rights to the names of the various SGT brands were sold individually.

The Waltham brand name was purchased by the Japanese firm Heiwado & Co. and soon emerged as one of the most popular brands in Japan.

In 2011 a majority stake in Waltham International SA was sold to Italian-American entrepreneur Antonio DiBenedetto.

== Legacy ==
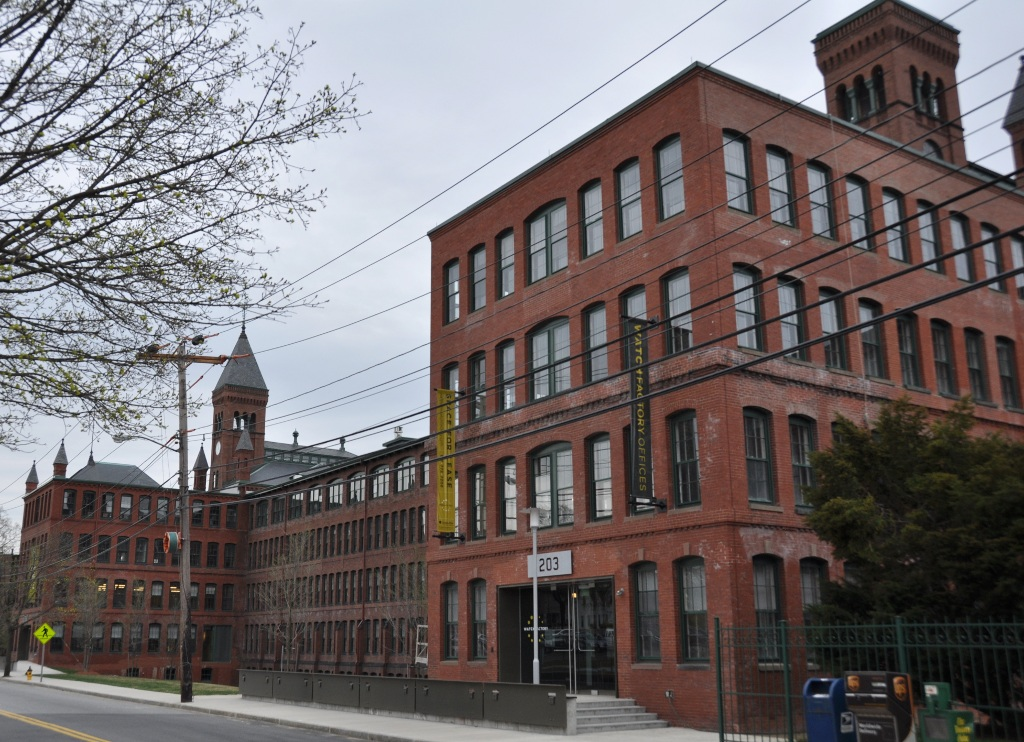
A photograph of the historic American Waltham Watch Company mill building, part of the American Waltham Watch Company Historic District in Waltham, Massachusetts.

Before the Waltham Watch Company went out of business in 1957, it founded a subsidiary in Switzerland in 1954, Waltham International SA. Waltham International SA retains the right to the Waltham trade name outside of North America, and continues to produce mechanical wrist watches and mechanical pocket watches under the "Waltham" brand.

During their restructuring efforts in the 1950s, Waltham opened an office in New York for the purposes of importing Swiss watch movements and cases. Due to restrictions placed on the company by its main creditor, the Restructuring Finance Corporation, they could not sell these watches directly, so they were sold through an independent company, the Hallmark Watch Company.

Specialized clocks and chronographs for use in aircraft control panels continued to be made in the Waltham factory by the Waltham Precision Instruments Company. In February 1994, Prime Time Clocks purchased the last remaining product line, the mechanical aircraft clock. Waltham Precision Instruments was moved to Ozark, Alabama and changed its name to Waltham Aircraft Clock Corporation.

== Historical resources ==
Every watch movement that the company produced through the early 1950s was engraved with an individual serial number. That number can be used to estimate the date of production. Volunteers have created a database of Waltham serial numbers, models and grades, and descriptions of observed watches.

The archive of the Waltham Watch Company is housed by Baker Library Special Collections department of the library of Harvard Business School, Harvard University. The material, which includes company books primarily from 1854 to 1929, is contained in 52 archival boxes, totaling 111 linear feet.

== See also ==
- American system of watch manufacturing
- Benrus Watch Company
- Bulova Watch Company
- Dennison Watch
- Elgin Watch Company
- Gruen Watch Company
- Hamilton Watch Company
- Illinois Watch Company
