= 1854 in the United States =

- Decades: 1830s; 1840s; 1850s; 1860s; 1870s
- See also: History of the United States (1849–1865); Timeline of United States history (1820–1859); List of years in the United States

Events from the year 1854 in the United States.

== Incumbents ==
=== Federal government ===
- President: Franklin Pierce (D-New Hampshire)
- Vice President: vacant
- Chief Justice: Roger B. Taney (Maryland)
- Speaker of the House of Representatives: Linn Boyd (D-Kentucky)
- Congress: 33rd

==== State governments ====
Governors and lieutenant governors

=== Governors ===
- Governor of Alabama: John A. Winston (Democratic)
- Governor of Arkansas: Elias Nelson Conway (Democratic)
- Governor of California: John Bigler (Democratic)
- Governor of Connecticut: Charles H. Pond (Democratic) (until May 3), Henry Dutton (Whig) (starting May 3)
- Governor of Delaware: William H. H. Ross (Democratic)
- Governor of Florida: James E. Broome (Democratic)
- Governor of Georgia: Herschel V. Johnson (Democratic)
- Governor of Illinois:Joel Aldrich Matteson (Democratic)
- Governor of Indiana: Joseph A. Wright (Democratic)
- Governor of Iowa: Stephen P. Hempstead (Democratic) (until December 9), James W. Grimes (Whig) (starting December 9)
- Governor of Kentucky: Lazarus W. Powell (Democratic)
- Governor of Louisiana: Paul Octave Hébert (Democratic)
- Governor of Maine: William G. Crosby (Whig)
- Governor of Maryland: Enoch Louis Lowe (Democratic) (until January 11), Thomas W. Ligon (Democratic) (starting January 11)
- Governor of Massachusetts: John H. Clifford (Whig) (until January 12), Emory Washburn (Whig) (starting January 12)
- Governor of Michigan: Andrew Parsons (Democratic)
- Governor of Mississippi:
  - until January 5: Henry S. Foote (Democratic)
  - January 5-10: John J. Pettus (Democratic)
  - starting January 10: John J. McRae (Democratic)
- Governor of Missouri: Sterling Price (Democratic)
- Governor of New Hampshire: Noah Martin (Democratic) (until June 8), Nathaniel B. Baker (Democratic) (starting June 8)
- Governor of New Jersey: George F. Fort (Democratic) (until January 17), Rodman M. Price (Democratic) (starting January 17)
- Governor of New York: Horatio Seymour (Democratic) (until end of December 31)
- Governor of North Carolina: David Settle Reid (Democratic) (until December 6), Warren Winslow (Democratic) (starting December 6)
- Governor of Ohio: William Medill (Democratic)
- Governor of Pennsylvania: William Bigler (Democratic)
- Governor of Rhode Island: Francis M. Dimond (Democratic) (until May 2), William W. Hoppin (Whig) (starting May 2)
- Governor of South Carolina: John Lawrence Manning (Democratic) (until December 11), James Hopkins Adams (Democratic) (starting December 11)
- Governor of Tennessee: Andrew Johnson (Democratic)
- Governor of Texas: Elisha M. Pease (Democratic)
- Governor of Vermont: John S. Robinson (Democratic) (until October 13), Stephen Royce (Whig)/(Republican) (starting October 13)
- Governor of Virginia: Joseph Johnson (Democratic)
- Governor of Wisconsin: Leonard J. Farwell (Whig) (until January 2), William A. Barstow (Democratic) (starting January 2)

=== Lieutenant governors ===
- Lieutenant Governor of California: Samuel Purdy (Democratic)
- Lieutenant Governor of Connecticut: vacant (until May 3), Alexander H. Holley (Whig) (starting May 3)
- Lieutenant Governor of Illinois: Gustavus Koerner (Democratic)
- Lieutenant Governor of Indiana: Ashbel P. Willard (Democratic)
- Lieutenant Governor of Kentucky: vacant
- Lieutenant Governor of Louisiana: William Wood Farmer (Democratic) (starting month and day unknown), Robert C. Wickliffe (Democratic) (starting month and day unknown)
- Lieutenant Governor of Massachusetts: Elisha Huntington (Democratic) (starting month and day unknown), William C. Plunkett (Democratic) (starting month and day unknown)
- Lieutenant Governor of Michigan: George Griswold (Democratic)
- Lieutenant Governor of Missouri: Wilson Brown (Democratic)
- Lieutenant Governor of New York: Sanford E. Church (Democratic) (until end of December 31)
- Lieutenant Governor of Ohio: vacant (until January 9), James Myers (Democratic) (starting January 9)
- Lieutenant Governor of Rhode Island: Francis M. Dimond (Democratic) (until May 2), John J. Reynolds (political party unknown) (starting May 2)
- Lieutenant Governor of South Carolina: James Irby (Democratic) (until December 11), Richard de Treville (Democratic) (starting December 11)
- Lieutenant Governor of Texas: David Catchings Dickson (Democratic)
- Lieutenant Governor of Vermont: Jefferson P. Kidder (Democratic) (until October 13), Ryland Fletcher (Republican) (starting October 13)
- Lieutenant Governor of Virginia: Shelton Leake (Democratic)
- Lieutenant Governor of Wisconsin: James T. Lewis (Republican)

== Events ==
=== January–June ===
- January 4 – Senator Stephen Douglas introduces a bill to form the Nebraska Territory. The bill sparks major debates related to slavery issues and evolves into the Kansas–Nebraska Act.
- February 14 – Texas is linked by telegraph with the rest of the United States, when a connection between New Orleans and Marshall, Texas is completed.
- February 28 – The Black Warrior Affair: A ship destined for New York City is detained in Havana, Cuba (under Spanish control at the time). The incident strains U.S.–Spanish relations.
- March 20
  - Anti-slavery activists of the Kansas–Nebraska Act meeting at the Little White Schoolhouse in Ripon, Wisconsin form the Republican Party.
  - The Boston Public Library opens to the public.
- March 30 – Battle of Cieneguilla: The U.S. First Regiment of Dragoons attacks a larger force of Jicarilla Apache and Ute Native Americans near present-day Pilar, New Mexico. The Americans are forced to retreat after losing more than half their number.

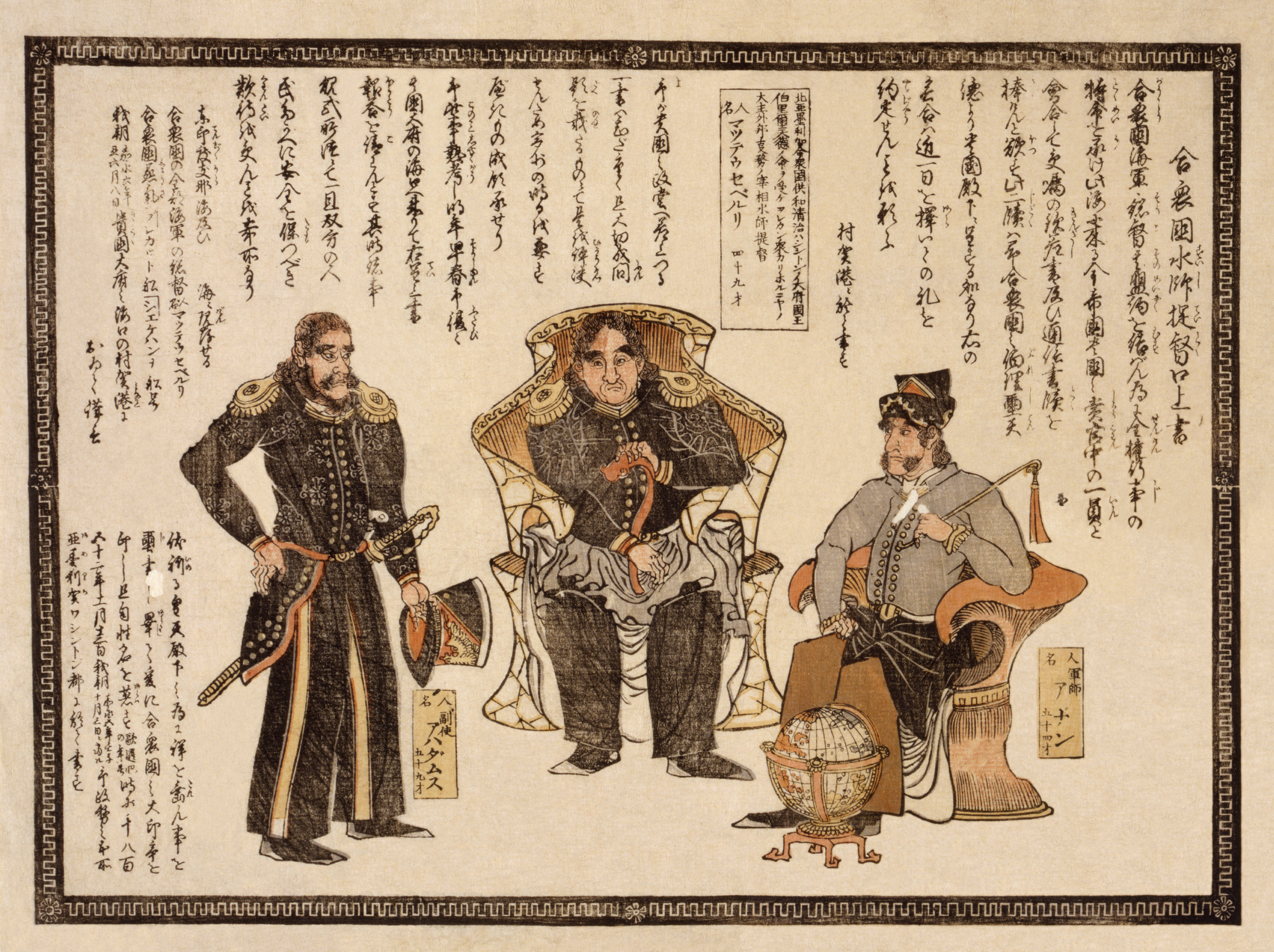
March 31: Perry (center) signs the Convention of Kanagawa

- March 31 – Commodore Matthew Perry of the U.S. Navy signs the Treaty/Convention of Kanagawa with the Japanese government (the Tokugawa Shogunate), opening the ports of Shimoda and Hakodate to American trade (see History of Japan).
- April 16 – The American packet ship Powhattan is wrecked off the shore of New Jersey with a loss of more than 200 lives.
- May – Elisha Otis publicly debuts his safety elevator at the New York World's Fair.
- May 24 – Slave Runaway Anthony Burns is arrested in Boston, MA and soon thereafter (June 2) shipped back to Virginia–back into a life of slavery. Abolitionists of the North would be infuriated.
- May 27 – Taiping Rebellion: United States minister Robert McLane arrives at Nanjing aboard the U.S. Navy warship USS Susquehanna.
- May 30 – The Kansas–Nebraska Act is signed into law, creating Kansas Territory and Nebraska Territory, opening new lands, repealing the Missouri Compromise of 1820, and allowing settlers in those territories to determine if they would allow slavery within their boundaries.
- June 10 – The first class of the United States Naval Academy graduates at Annapolis, Maryland.

=== July–December ===
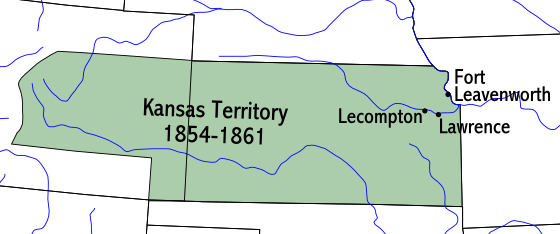
Kansas Territory

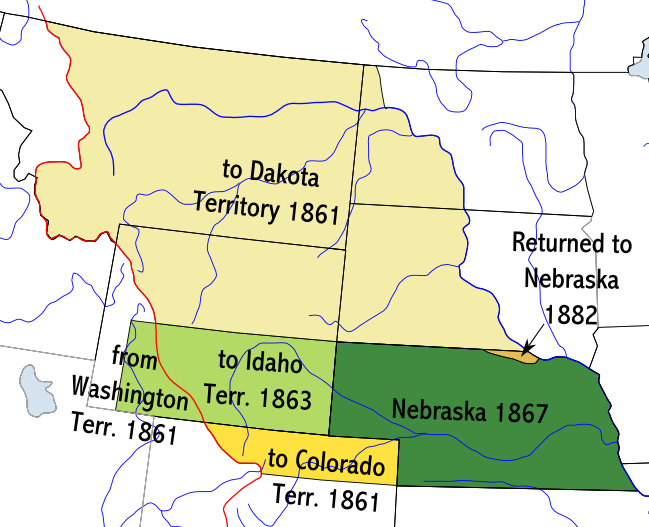
Nebraska Territory

- July 4 – Henry David Thoreau delivers his fierce speech, Slavery in Massachusetts in Framingham, MA, harping on American politicians and journalists, all the while calling for action against the injustice of slavery within the Union.
- July 6 – In Jackson, Michigan, the first convention of the Republican Party is held.
- July 8 – An anti-Catholic riot in Bath, Maine, destroys a church used by Irish Catholics.
- July 13 – Bombardment of San Juan del Norte: The USS Cyane attacks San Juan del Norte, Nicaragua.
- August 7–8 – Know Nothings riot against immigrants in St. Louis, Missouri, leading to 10 deaths.
- August 9 – Walden first published.
- August 19 – Grattan massacre: A group of U.S. Army soldiers in Nebraska Territory in present-day Wyoming are killed by Lakota Sioux warriors after they killed Chief Conquering Bear, starting the First Sioux War.
- September 28 or 29 – Sloop USS Albany (1846) is lost off the coast of Venezuela with all hands.
- October 1 – The watch company founded in 1850 in Roxbury, Massachusetts by Aaron Lufkin Dennison relocates to Waltham to become the Waltham Watch Company, pioneer in the American System of Watch Manufacturing.
- October 9–11 – The controversial Ostend Manifesto is secretly drafted. The document implies that the U.S. should acquire Cuba from Spain as slave territory by any means necessary.
- October 16 – Abraham Lincoln, in his "Peoria speech", expresses opposition to the Kansas–Nebraska Act, Popular Sovereignty, and the expansion of slavery in the United States.
- November 29 – Bleeding Kansas: A pro-slavery Democrat, John Wilkins Whitfield, is elected as the congressional delegate for Kansas Territory.
- December 26 – The Treaty of Medicine Creek is signed in Washington Territory. The U.S. acquires land from various Native American tribes and in return creates three reservations.

=== Undated ===
- Professor Benjamin Silliman, Jr. of Yale University, using the fractional distillation process developed by his father, Benjamin Silliman Sr, now becomes the first person to fractionate petroleum into its individual components by distillation. Thus, petroleum products like gasoline and kerosene are first produced.
- Waterbury, Connecticut brass manufacturer Benedict & Burnham Manufacturing Company create the department, and eventual independent company, Waterbury Clock Company. This becomes the predecessor of the modern-day Timex Group USA, manufacturer of timepieces.
- Achulet massacre: More than 65 Tolowa people are killed by settlers in California.

=== Ongoing ===
- California Gold Rush (1848–1855)
- Bleeding Kansas (1854–1860)

== Births ==
- January 1 – Louis Saint-Gaudens, sculptor (died 1913)
- January 9 – Lady Randolph Churchill, born Jennie Jerome, American-born British socialite and mother of Winston Churchill (died 1921 in the United Kingdom)
- January 29 – Fred Baker, physician and naturalist (died 1938)
- February 2 – Emily Elizabeth Holman, architect (died 1925)
- February 26 – Mary M. Cohen, social economist and proto-feminist (died 1911)
- March 14 – Thomas R. Marshall, 28th vice president of the United States from 1913 to 1921 (died 1925)
- March 31 – Jane Toppan, born Honora Kelley, serial killer (died 1938)
- May 11 – Albion Woodbury Small, sociologist (died 1926)
- May 24 – John Riley Banister, law officer and Texas Ranger (died 1918)
- June 9 – John F. Shafroth, U.S. Senator from Colorado from 1913 to 1919 (died 1922)
- June 14 – Dave Rudabaugh, outlaw and gunfighter (killed 1886 in Mexico)
- June 24 – Eleanor Norcross, painter (died 1923)
- July 3/4 – King O'Malley, politician in Australia (died 1953 in Australia)
- July 12 – George Eastman, photographic inventor (Eastman Kodak) (suicide 1932)
- July 23 – Birt Acres, cinematographic inventor (died 1918 in the United Kingdom)
- July 30 – John Sharp Williams, U.S. Senator from Mississippi from 1911 to 1923 (died 1932)
- August 2 – Francis Marion Crawford, novelist (died 1909)
- August 18 – James Paul Clarke, 18th governor of Arkansas from 1895 to 1897 and U.S. Senator from Arkansas from 1903 to 1916 (died 1916)
- September 1 – Florence Trail, educator and author (died 1944)
- October 3 – William C. Gorgas, physician, Surgeon General (died 1920)
- October 26 – C. W. Post, cereal manufacturer (died 1914)
- October 31 – Laton Alton Huffman, photographer of the American frontier and Native American life (died 1931)
- November 6 – John Philip Sousa, composer and conductor ("The Stars and Stripes Forever") (died 1932)
- November 13 – George Whitefield Chadwick, composer (died 1931)
- December 16 – Austin M. Knight, admiral (died 1927)
- December 25 – Ida Dixon, socialite and golf course architect (died 1916)

== Deaths ==
- January 18 – Robert M. Charlton, U.S. Senator from Georgia from 1852 to 1853 (born 1807)
- March 11 – Willard Richards, religious leader (born 1804)
- April 6 – William Strickland, architect and civil engineer (born 1788)
- April 30 – William Matthews, first American-born Roman Catholic priest (born 1770)
- July 31 – Samuel Wilson, meat-packer thought to be the real-life basis for Uncle Sam (born 1766 in the Province of Massachusetts Bay)
- August 14 – Solomon W. Downs, U.S. Senator from Louisiana from 1847 to 1853 (born 1801)
- August 19 – Conquering Bear, Lakota chief
- August 21 – Thomas Clayton, lawyer, U.S. Senator from Delaware from 1824 to 1827 and from 1837 to 1847 (born 1777)
- August 29 – John Black, U.S. Senator from Mississippi from 1832 to 1838 (born 1800)
- October 1 – Anne Royall, travel writer and journalist (born 1769)
- October 8 – Gideon Tomlinson, U.S. Senator from Connecticut from 1831 to 1837 (born 1780)
- October 28 – James P. Carrell, composer and songbook compiler (born 1787)
- November 9 – Elizabeth Schuyler Hamilton, wife of Alexander Hamilton, co-founder and deputy director of the first private orphanage in New York City (born 1757)
- December 28 – James Morehead, U.S. Senator from Kentucky from 1841 to 1847 (born 1797)
- Full date unknown – Henry Bibb, author and abolitionist, born a slave (born 1815)

== See also ==
- Timeline of United States history (1820–1859)
