= 1854 =

1854 in various calendars
- Gregorian calendar: 1854; MDCCCLIV
- Ab urbe condita: 2607
- Armenian calendar: 1303; ԹՎ ՌՅԳ
- Assyrian calendar: 6604
- Baháʼí calendar: 10–11
- Balinese saka calendar: 1775–1776
- Bengali calendar: 1260–1261
- Berber calendar: 2804
- British Regnal year: 17 Vict. 1 – 18 Vict. 1
- Buddhist calendar: 2398
- Burmese calendar: 1216
- Byzantine calendar: 7362–7363
- Chinese calendar: 癸丑年 (Water Ox); 4551 or 4344 — to — 甲寅年 (Wood Tiger); 4552 or 4345
- Coptic calendar: 1570–1571
- Discordian calendar: 3020
- Ethiopian calendar: 1846–1847
- Hebrew calendar: 5614–5615
- Hindu calendars
- Vikram Samvat: 1910–1911
- Shaka Samvat: 1775–1776
- Kali Yuga: 4954–4955
- Holocene calendar: 11854
- Igbo calendar: 854–855
- Iranian calendar: 1232–1233
- Islamic calendar: 1270–1271
- Japanese calendar: Kaei 7 / Ansei 1 (安政元年)
- Javanese calendar: 1782–1783
- Julian calendar: Gregorian minus 12 days
- Korean calendar: 4187
- Minguo calendar: 58 before ROC 民前58年
- Nanakshahi calendar: 386
- Thai solar calendar: 2396–2397
- Tibetan calendar: ཆུ་མོ་གླང་ལོ་ (female Water-Ox); 1980 or 1599 or 827 — to — ཤིང་ཕོ་སྟག་ལོ་ (male Wood-Tiger); 1981 or 1600 or 828

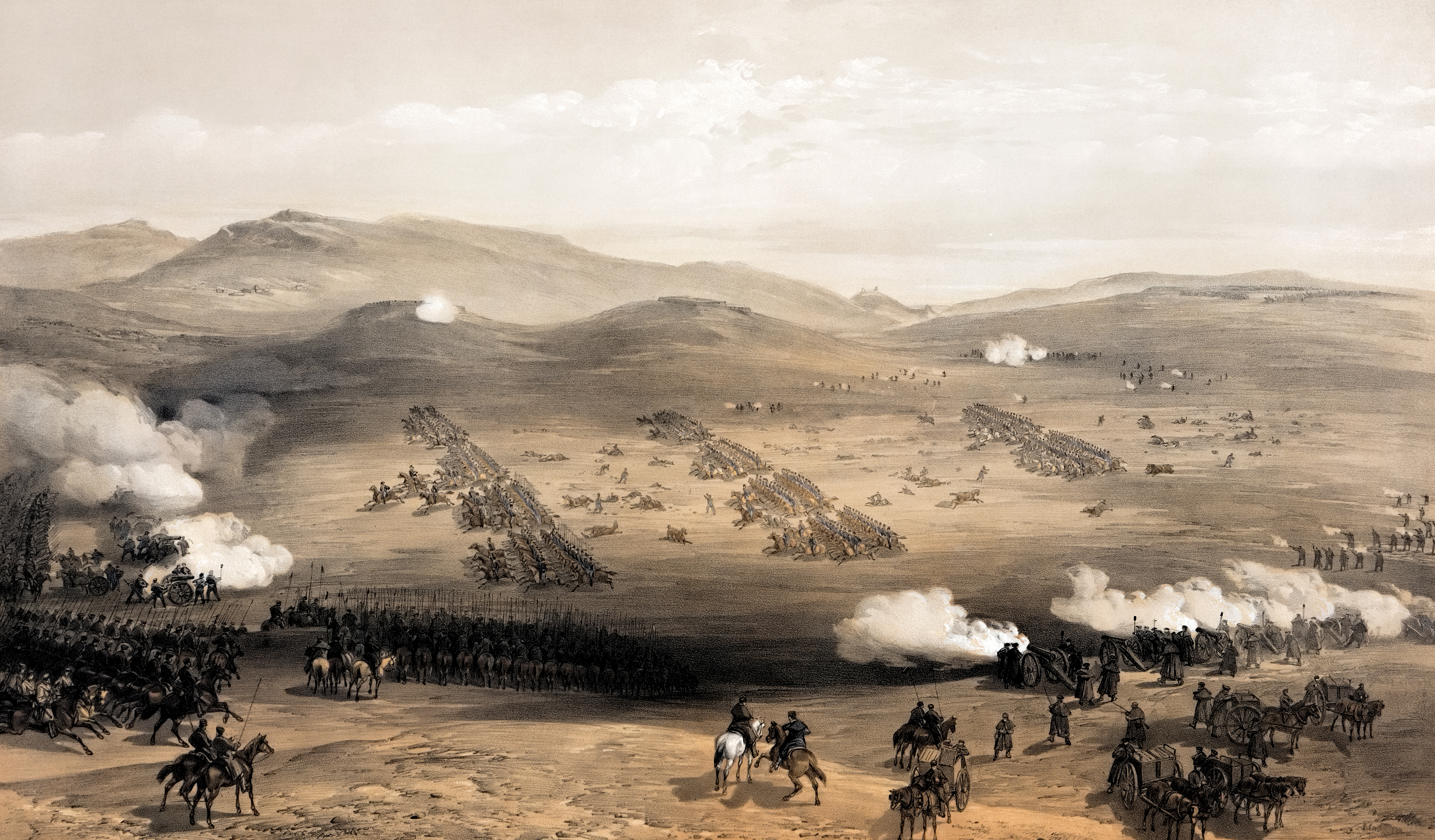
October 25: The Charge of the Light Brigade

1854 (MDCCCLIV) was a common year starting on Sunday of the Gregorian calendar and a common year starting on Friday of the Julian calendar, the 1854th year of the Common Era (CE) and Anno Domini (AD) designations, the 854th year of the 2nd millennium, the 54th year of the 19th century, and the 5th year of the 1850s decade. As of the start of 1854, the Gregorian calendar was 12 days ahead of the Julian calendar, which remained in localized use until 1923.

== Events ==
=== January–March ===
- January 4 – The McDonald Islands are discovered by Captain William McDonald aboard the Samarang.
- January 6 – The fictional detective Sherlock Holmes is perhaps born.
- January 9 – The Teutonia Männerchor in Pittsburgh is founded to promote German culture.
- January 20 – The North Carolina General Assembly in the United States charters the Atlantic and North Carolina Railroad, to run from Goldsboro through New Bern, to the newly created seaport of Morehead City, near Beaufort.
- January 21 – The iron clipper RMS Tayleur runs aground off the east coast of Ireland, on her maiden voyage out of Liverpool, bound for Australia, with the loss of at least 300 out of 650 on board.
- February 11 – Major streets are lit by coal gas for the first time by the San Francisco Gas Company; 86 such lamps are turned on this evening in San Francisco, California.
- February 13 – Mexican troops force William Walker and his troops to retreat to Sonora.
- February 14 – Texas is linked by telegraph with the rest of the United States, when a connection between New Orleans and Marshall, Texas is completed.
- February 17 – The British recognize the independence of the Orange Free State in Southern Africa; its official independence is declared six days later in the Orange River Convention.
- February 27 – Britain sends Russia an ultimatum to withdraw from two Romanian provinces it has conquered, Moldavia and Wallachia.
- March 1
  - The British Inman Line's SS City of Glasgow sets out from Liverpool on passage to the United States with 480 on board; she is lost without a trace.
  - German psychologist Friedrich Eduard Beneke disappears; 2 years later his remains are found in the canal near Charlottenburg.
  - The Plan de Ayutla calls for liberal reforms and the ouster of President Antonio López de Santa Anna of Mexico.
- March 3 – Australia's first telegraph line, linking Melbourne and Williamstown, Victoria, opens.
- March 11 – A Royal Navy fleet sails from Britain, under Vice Admiral Sir Charles Napier.
- March 20 – In the United States:
  - The Boston Public Library opens to the public.
  - The Republican Party is formed by anti-slavery opponents of the Kansas–Nebraska Act in Ripon, Wisconsin.
- March 24 – Slavery is abolished in Venezuela.
- March 27 – Crimean War: The United Kingdom declares war on Russia.
- March 28 – Crimean War: France declares war on Russia.
- March 31 – United States Navy Commodore Matthew C. Perry signs the Convention of Kanagawa with the Japanese government (the Tokugawa shogunate), opening the ports of Shimoda and Hakodate to American trade.
- March – The British East India Company annexes Jhansi State in India under the doctrine of lapse.

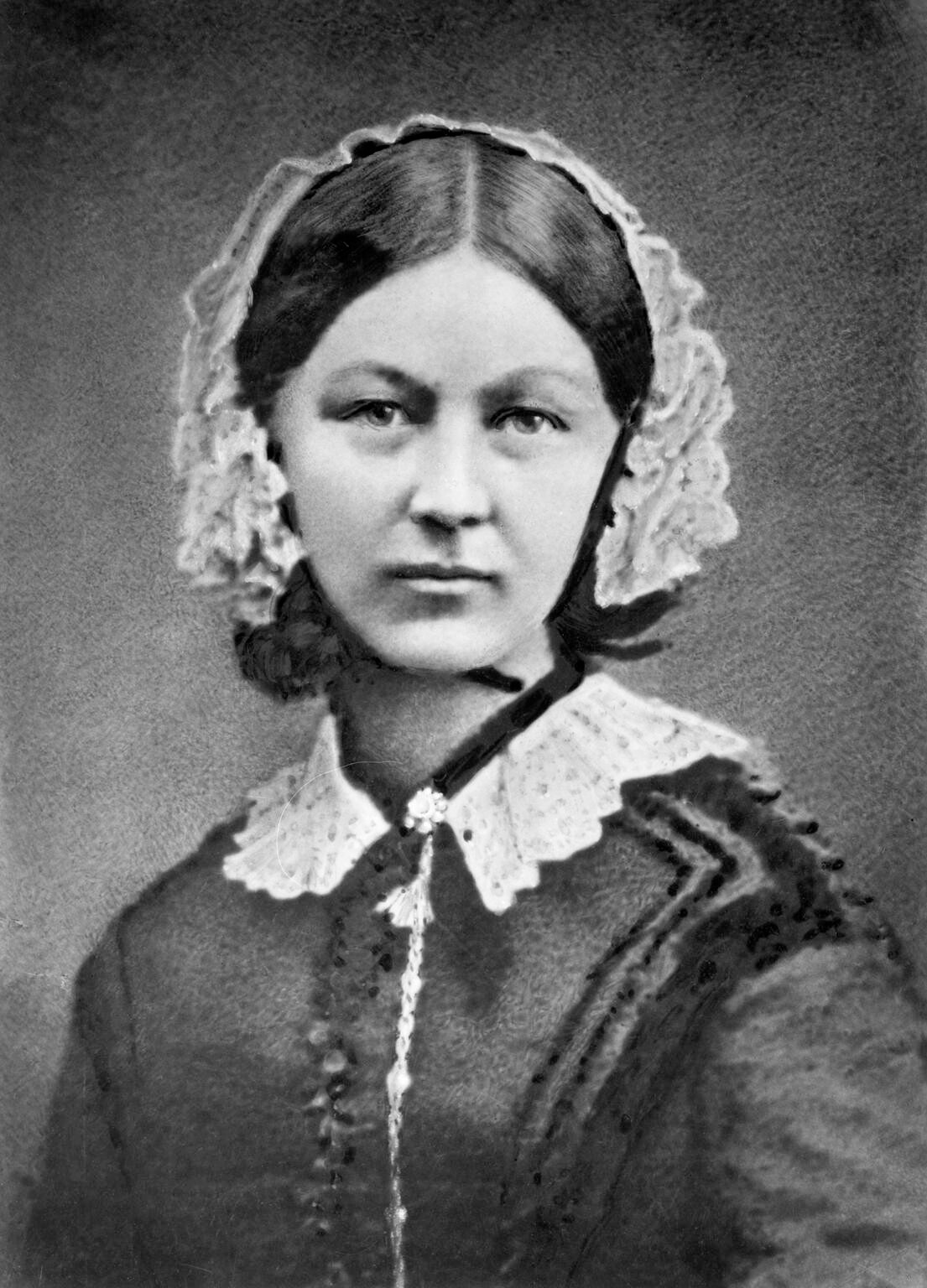
November: Florence Nightingale arrives with 38-nurse team to provide care for Crimean War wounded.

=== April–June ===
- April 1 – Hard Times begins serialisation in Charles Dickens' magazine, Household Words.
- April 16 – The United States packet ship Powhattan is wrecked off the New Jersey shore, with more than 200 victims.
- May 5–15 – Hokkien–Teochew Riots in Singapore.
- May 18 – The Catholic University of Ireland (forerunner of University College Dublin) is founded.
- May 27 – Taiping Rebellion: United States diplomatic minister Robert McLane arrives at the Heavenly Capital aboard the USS Susquehanna.
- May 30 – The Kansas–Nebraska Act becomes law (replacing the Missouri Compromise of 1820), creating the Kansas Territory and the Nebraska Territory, west of the State of Missouri and the State of Iowa. The Kansas–Nebraska Act also establishes that these two new Territories will decide either to allow or disallow slavery, depending on balloting by their residents (these areas would have been strictly "free territory" under the Missouri Compromise, which allowed slavery in the State of Missouri but disallowed it in any other new state north of latitude 36° 30', which forms most of the southern boundary of Missouri. This prohibition of slavery extended all the way from the western boundary of Missouri to the Pacific Ocean).
- June 10 – The first class of the United States Naval Academy graduates at Annapolis, Maryland.
- June 21 – Battle of Bomarsund in Åland off the coast of Finland: British Royal Navy seaman's mate Charles Davis Lucas throws a live Russian artillery shell overboard by hand before it explodes, for which he is awarded the first Victoria Cross in 1857.
- June – The Grand Excursion takes prominent Eastern United States inhabitants from Chicago to Rock Island, Illinois, by railroad, then up the Mississippi River to Saint Paul, Minnesota, by steamboat.

=== July–September ===
- July 4 – James Ambrose Cutting takes out the first of his three United States patents for improvements to the wet plate collodion process (Ambrotype photography).
- July 6 – In Jackson, Michigan, the first convention of the U.S. Republican Party is held.
- July 7 – The Bombay Spinning and Weaving Company is established as the first cotton mill in India by Cowasjee Nanabhoy Davar and associates.
- July 13 – Mohamed Sa'id Pasha succeeds his nephew Abbas as the Wāli of Egypt and Sudan, then a province of the Ottoman Empire.
- July 17 – The Bienio progresista revolutionary coup occurs in Spain.
- July 19 – Wood's despatch is sent by Charles Wood, 1st Viscount Halifax to Lord Dalhousie, Governor General of India, proposing radical improvements to the Indian educational system.
- August 9 – Johann succeeds to the throne of Saxony, on the death of his brother.
- August 16 – Battle of Bomarsund: Russian troops on the island of Bomarsund, in Åland, surrender to French–British troops.
- August 19 – John Lawrence Grattan leads 29 United States troops and a civilian interpreter in attack on Lakota village over dispute involving emigrant cow. Grattan's command was annihilated.
- August 27 – English lawyer Alfred Wills and party set out for the first ascent of the Wetterhorn in Switzerland, regarded as the start of the "golden age of alpinism".
- August 31–September 8 – An epidemic of cholera in London kills over 10,000. Dr John Snow traces the source of one outbreak (that killed 500) to a single water pump, validating his theory that cholera is water-borne, and forming the starting point for epidemiology.
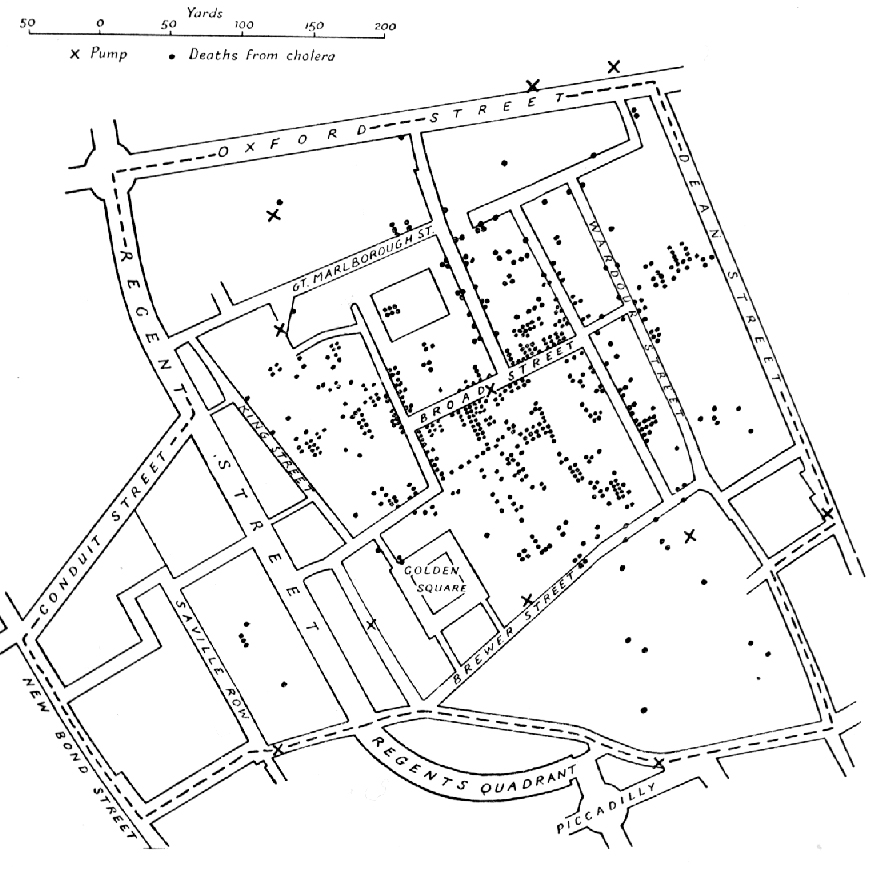
  Original map by Dr John Snow showing the clusters of cholera cases in the London epidemic of 1854
- September 9 – British Inman Line's SS City of Philadelphia (1854) is wrecked off Cape Race (Newfoundland) on her maiden voyage without loss of life.
- September 20 – Crimean War: Battle of Alma – The French–British alliance wins the first major land engagement of the war.
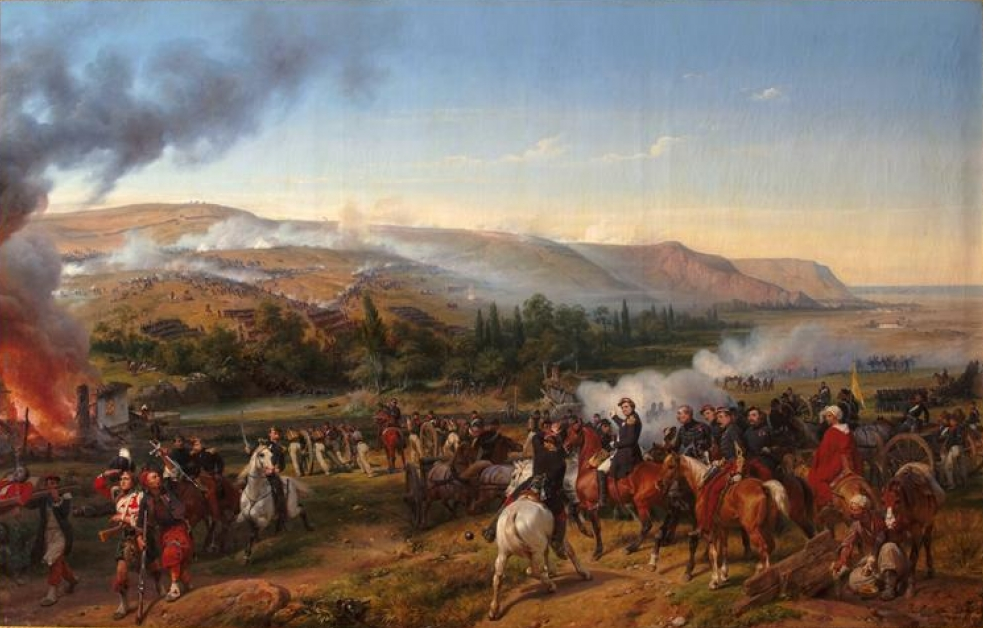
  Battle of Alma
- September 27 – SS Arctic disaster: The American paddle steamer SS Arctic sinks after a collision with the much smaller French ship SS Vesta, 50 miles (80 km) off the coast of Newfoundland, with approximately 320 deaths.

=== October–December ===
- October 1 – The watch company founded in 1850 in Roxbury, Massachusetts, by Aaron Lufkin Dennison, relocates to Waltham, to become the Waltham Watch Company, pioneer in the American system of watch manufacturing.
- October 6 – The great fire of Newcastle and Gateshead in England is ignited by a spectacular explosion.
- October 9–11 – United States diplomats in Europe meet and draft the Ostend Manifesto, setting out a rationale for the U.S. to acquire Cuba from Spain.
- October 17 – The Age newspaper is founded in Melbourne, Australia.
- October 25 – Crimean War: Battle of Balaclava – The allies gain an overall victory, except for the disastrous cavalry Charge of the Light Brigade, from which only 200 of 700 men survive.
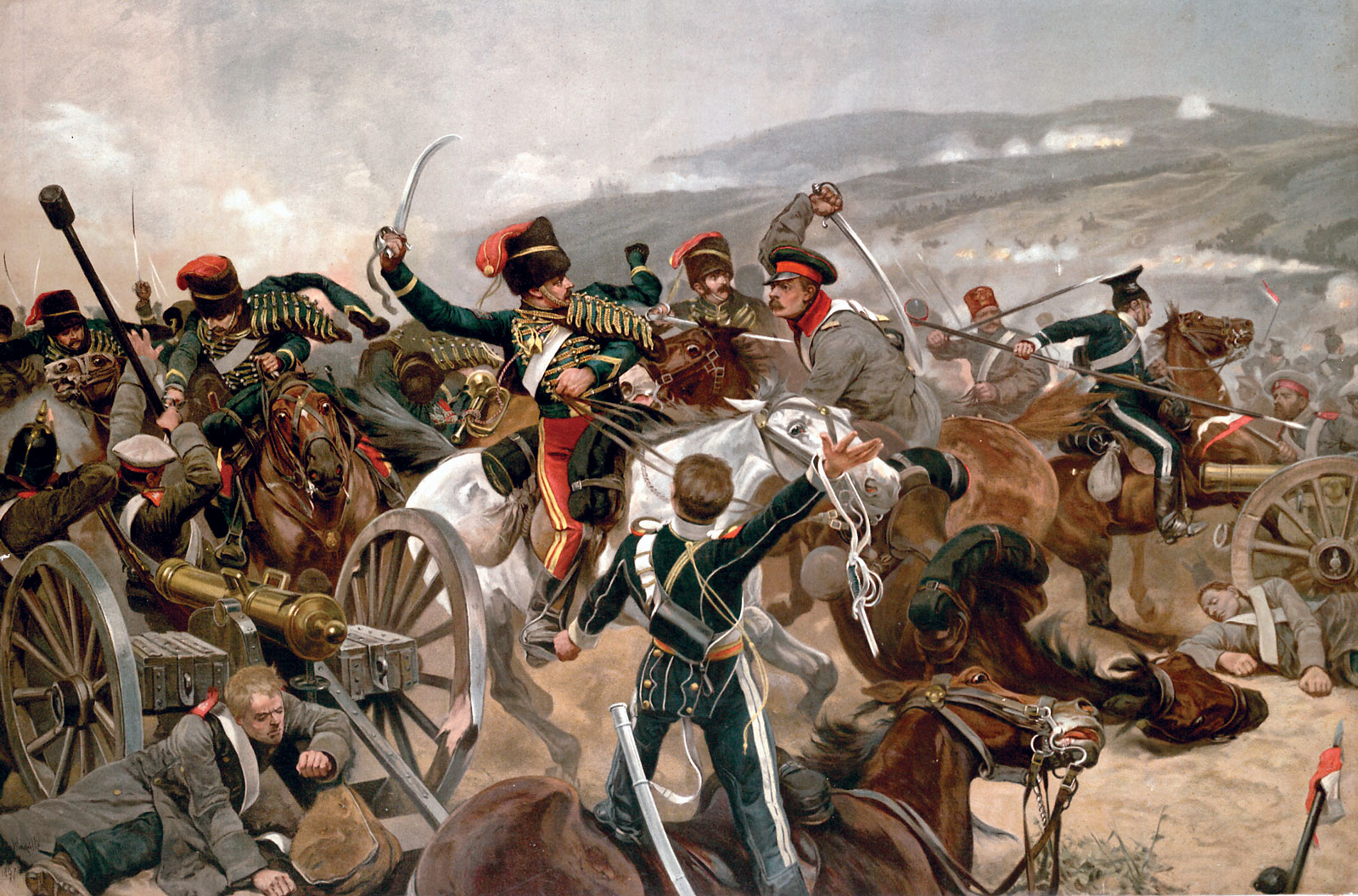
  October 25: Battle of Balaclava
- November 5 – Crimean War: Battle of Inkerman – The Russians are defeated.
- November 14 – Great Storm of 1854 in the Black Sea: 19 British transport and other ships (plus 2 French) supporting the Crimean War are wrecked with the loss of at least 287 men.
- November 17 – In Egypt, the Suez Canal Company is formed.
- November
  - Florence Nightingale and her team of 38 trained volunteer nurses, having set out on October 21 from England, arrive at Selimiye Barracks in Scutari in the Ottoman Empire, to care for British Army troops wounded in the Crimean War.
  - The Mute Rebellion breaks out in Sweden.
- December 3 – The Eureka Stockade Miners' Rebellion breaks out in Ballarat, Victoria (Australia).
- December 9 – Pope Pius IX in the apostolic constitution Ineffabilis Deus defines ex Cathedra the dogma of Immaculate Conception, which holds that the Blessed Virgin Mary was conceived without original sin.
- December 10 – Sa'id Pasha officially abolishes slavery in Egypt.

=== Undated ===
- Bryant & Stratton College is founded as a business institute in the United States.
- Ignacy Łukasiewicz drills the world's first oil well in Poland, in Bóbrka near Krosno County.
- Professor Benjamin Silliman of Yale University is the first person to fractionate petroleum into its individual components, by distillation.
- The Icelandic trade is opened to merchants other than Danes.
- A Russian fort is established at the modern-day site of Almaty.
- The French fashion label Louis Vuitton is founded.
- The future Waterbury Clock Company (Incorporated on March 27, 1857) is founded as a department within the Benedict and Burnham Manufacturing Company in Waterbury, Connecticut, the predecessor of Timex Group USA in timepiece manufacturing.

== Births ==
=== January–March ===
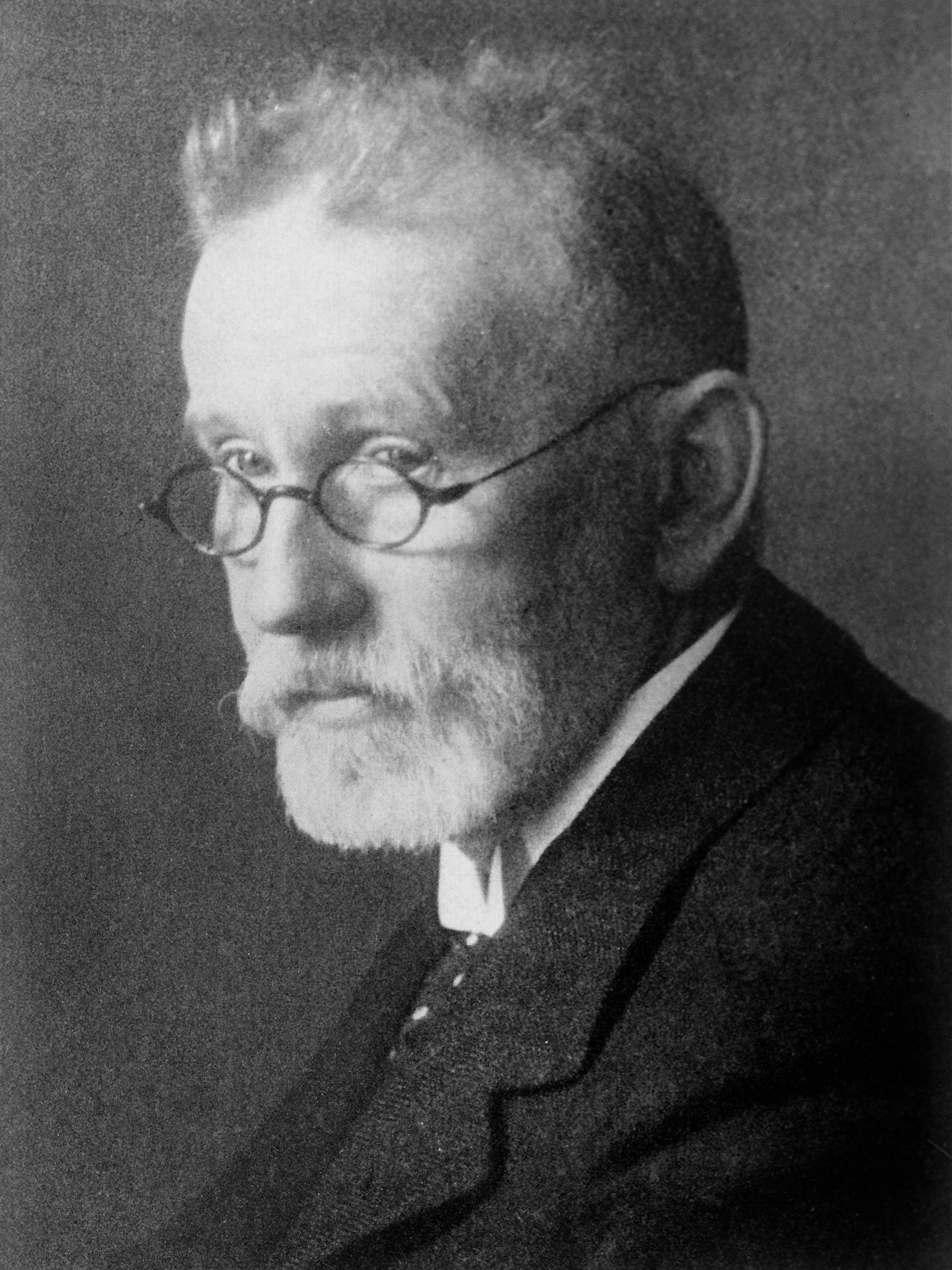
Paul Ehrlich

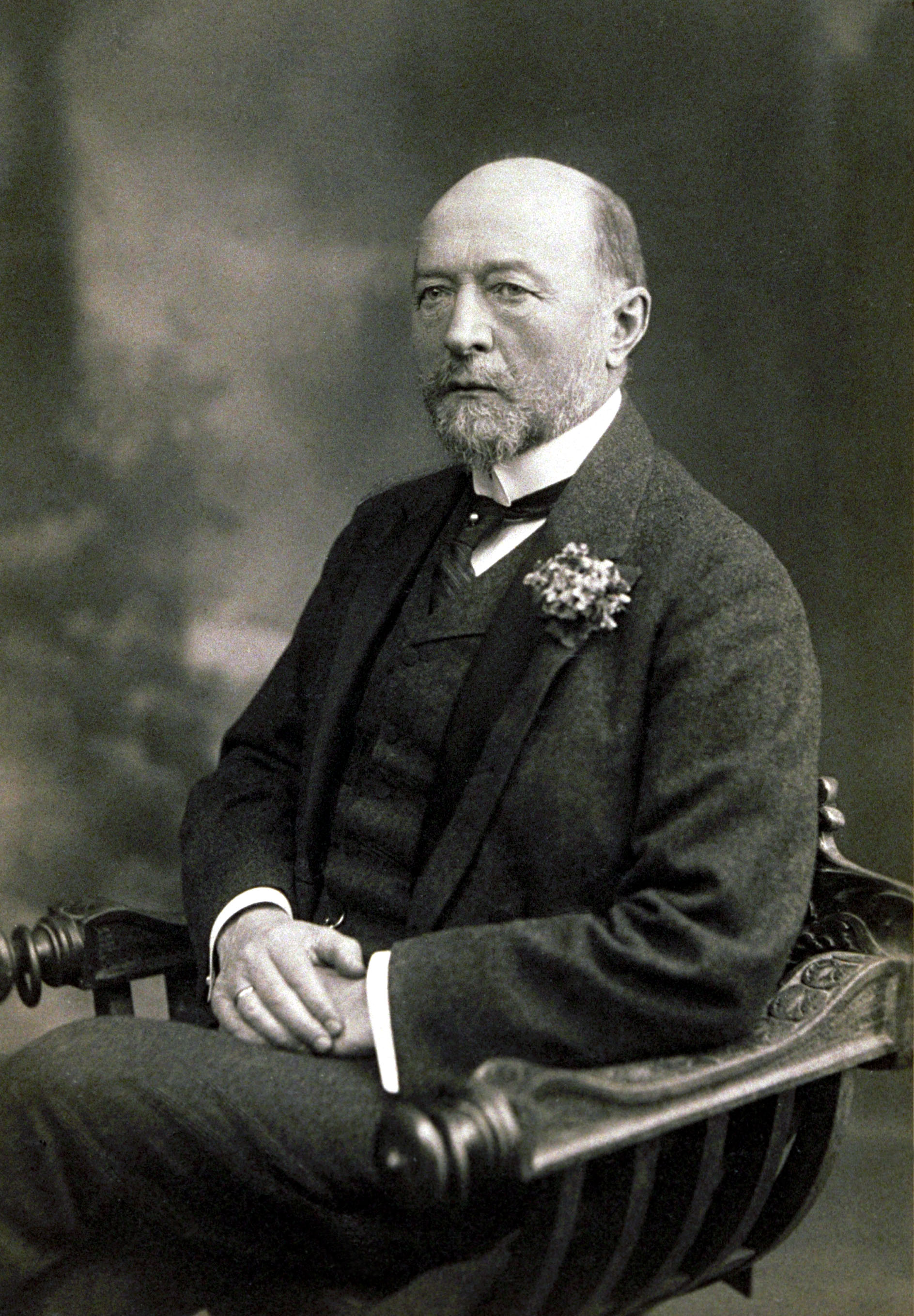
Emil von Behring

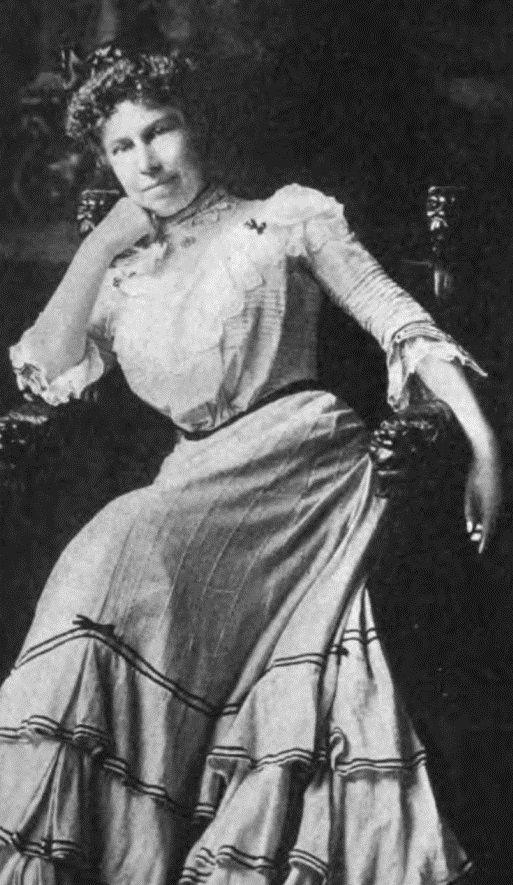
Clara Louise Burnham

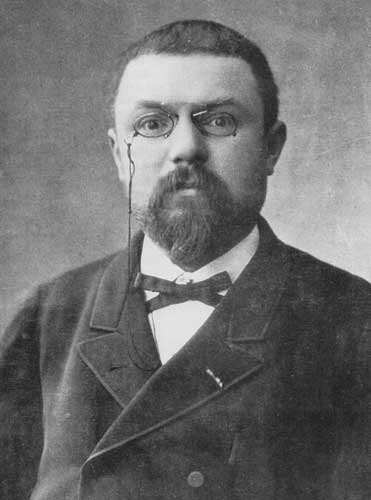
Henri Poincaré

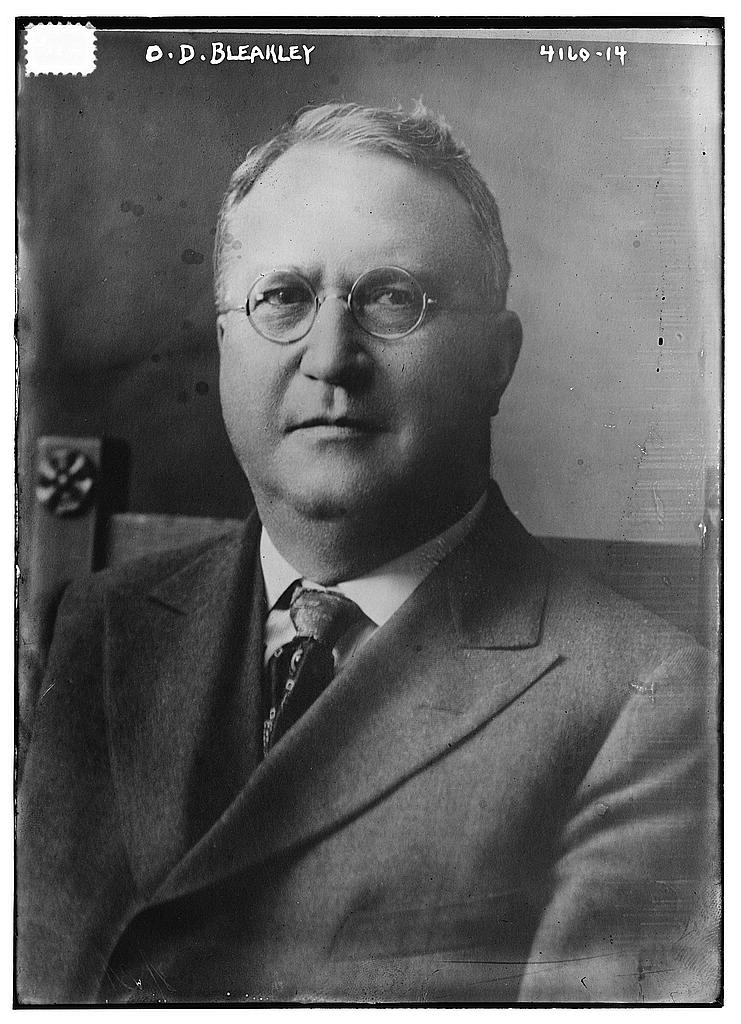
Orrin Dubbs Bleakley

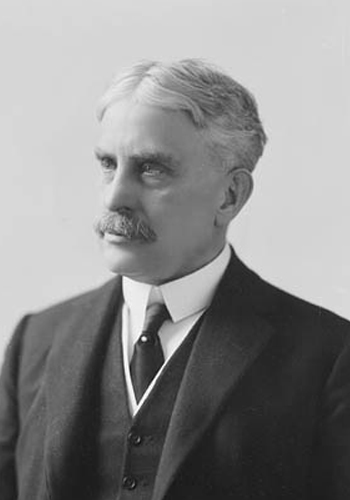
Robert Laird Borden

- January 1 – James George Frazer, Scottish social anthropologist (d. 1941)
- January 8 – Samuel Liddell MacGregor Mathers, British occultist (d. 1918)
- January 9 – Lady Randolph Churchill, born Jennie Jerome, American-born British socialite and mother of Winston Churchill (d. 1921)
- January 12
  - Kataoka Shichirō, Japanese admiral (d. 1920)
  - David Macpherson, Canadian-born American civil engineer (d. 1927)
- January 14 – Nikolai Pavlovich Bobyr, Russian general (d. 1920)
- February 9
  - Edward Carson, Irish Unionist MP and barrister (d. 1935)
  - Aletta Jacobs, Dutch physician and women's suffrage activist (d. 1929)
- February 16 – Charles Webster Leadbeater, British theosophist (d. 1934)
- February 17 – Friedrich Alfred Krupp, German industrialist (d. 1902)
- February 26 – Mary M. Cohen, American social economist (d. 1911)
- March 4 – Tomás António Garcia Rosado, Portuguese general (d. 1937)
- March 10
  - Florence Carpenter Ives, American journalist and editor (d. 1900)
  - Stanisław Tondos, Polish painter (d. 1917)
- March 11 – Jane Meade Welch, American historian (d. 1931)
- March 14 – Paul Ehrlich, German physician and scientist, recipient of the 1908 Nobel Prize in Physiology or Medicine (d. 1915)
- March 15 – Emil von Behring, German physiologist, winner of the 1901 Nobel Prize in Physiology or Medicine (d. 1917)
- March 18 – Nikolai Ruzsky, Russian general (d. 1918)
- March 30 – Hermann Kövess von Kövessháza, Austro-Hungarian field marshal (d. 1924)

=== April–June ===
- April 18 – Ludwig Levy, German architect (d. 1907)
- April 22 – Henri La Fontaine, Belgian lawyer, author, Nobel Prize laureate (d. 1943)
- April 28 – Hertha Ayrton, English engineer, mathematician and inventor (d. 1923)
- April 29
  - Henri Poincaré, French mathematician, physicist (d. 1912)
  - Paul von Rennenkampf, Russian nobleman, statesman, and general (d. 1918)
- May 5 – Orrin Dubbs Bleakley, member of the United States House of Representatives from Pennsylvania (d. 1927)
- May 11 – Albion Woodbury Small, American sociologist (d. 1926)
- May 24 – John Riley Banister, American law officer, Texas Ranger (d. 1918)
- May 25 – Clara Louise Burnham, American novelist (d. 1927)
- June 2 – Adolf von Brudermann, Austro-Hungarian general (d. 1945)
- June 8 – Douglas Cameron, Canadian politician. Lieutenant Governor of Manitoba (d. 1921)
- June 14 – Dave Rudabaugh, American outlaw, gunfighter (d. 1886)
- June 17 – Robert Kekewich, British general (d. 1914)
- June 21 – Andrew Jackson Houston, American politician (d. 1941)
- June 26 – Robert Borden, Canadian lawyer and politician, 8th Prime Minister of Canada, leader in World War I (d. 1937)

=== July–September ===
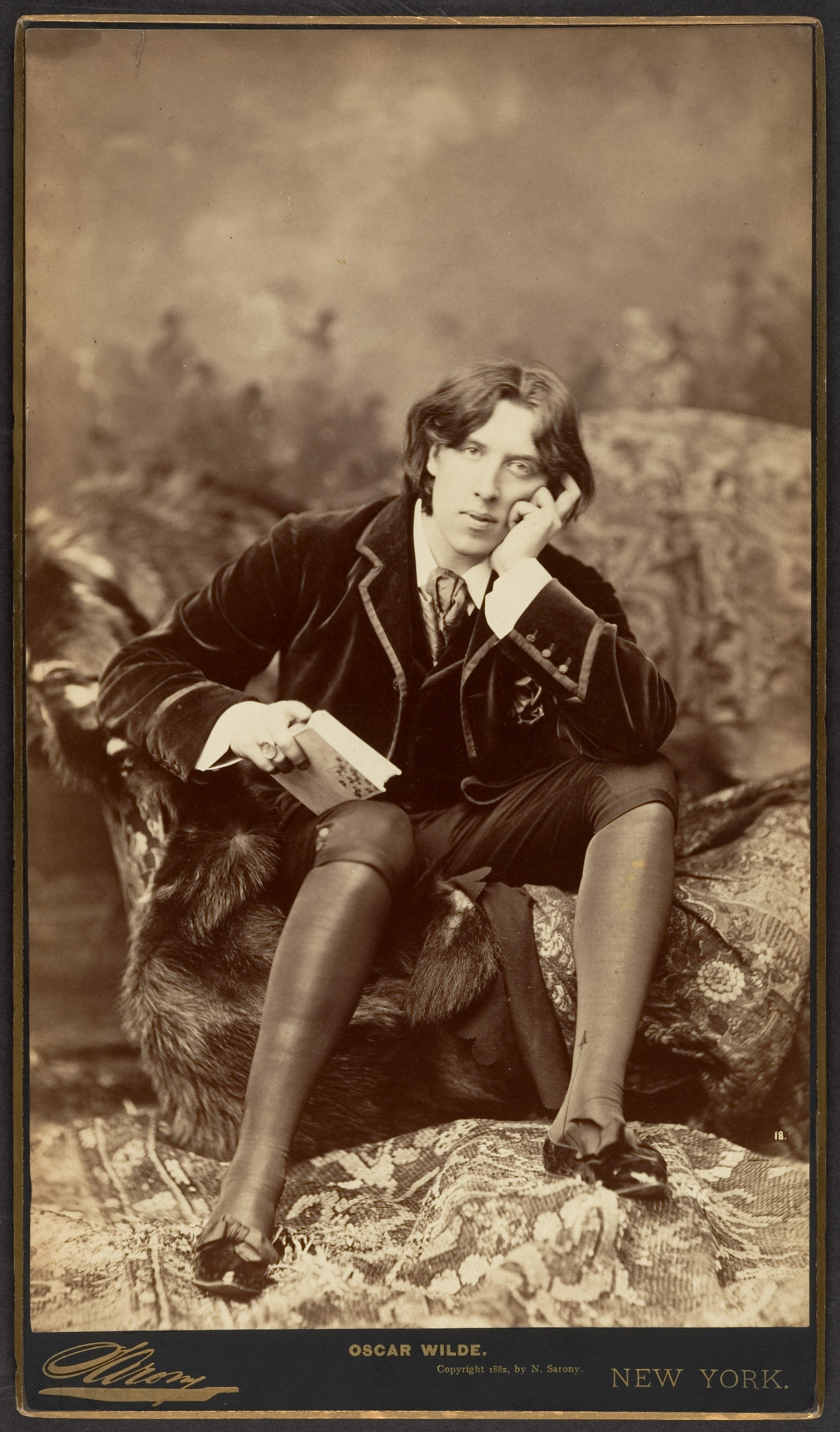
Oscar Wilde

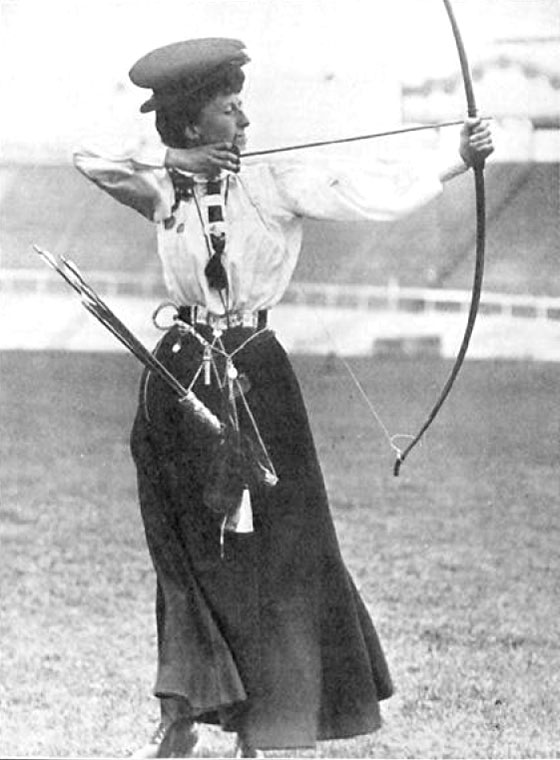
Queenie Newall

- July 2 – Sophia Braeunlich, American business manager (d. 1898)
- July 3 – Leoš Janáček, Czech composer (d. 1928)
- July 4 – Alexandru Marghiloman, 25th Prime Minister of Romania (d. 1925)
- July 12 – George Eastman, American photographic inventor (Kodak) (d. 1932)
- July 27 – Takahashi Korekiyo, 11th Prime Minister of Japan (d. 1936)
- July 31
  - Arthur Barclay, 15th president of Liberia (d. 1938)
  - José Canalejas y Méndez, Prime Minister of Spain (d. 1912)
- August 2 – Milan I of Serbia (d. 1901)
- August 23 – Moritz Moszkowski, Polish/German composer (d. 1925)
- September 1 – Engelbert Humperdinck, German composer (d. 1921)
- September 3 – Anna Sandström, Swedish social reformer (d. 1931)
- September 6 – Georges Picquart, French general, Minister of War (d. 1914)
- September 18 – Viktor Dankl von Krasnik, Austro-Hungarian general (d. 1941)

=== October–December ===
- October 3 – William C. Gorgas, American physician, Surgeon General (d. 1920)
- October 7 – Christiaan de Wet, Boer general, rebel leader, and politician (d. 1922)
- October 9 – Myron T. Herrick, American banker, diplomat, Republican politician and 42nd governor of Ohio (d. 1929)
- October 11 – Henriette Delamarre de Monchaux, French naturalist, geologist, paleontologist (d. 1911)
- October 16
  - Oscar Wilde, Irish writer (d. 1900)
  - Karl Kautsky, Czech Marxist theoretician (d. 1938)
- October 17 – Queenie Newall, British Olympic archer (d. 1929)
- October 20 – Arthur Rimbaud, French poet (d. 1891)
- October 26 – C. W. Post, American cereal manufacturer (d. 1914)
- October 28 – Mary G. Charlton Edholm, American social purity and temperance reformer (d. 1935)
- October 30 – Franz Rohr von Denta, Austro-Hungarian field marshal (d. 1927)
- November 3 – Carlo Fornasini, micropalaeontologist (d. 1931)
- November 5 – Paul Sabatier, French chemist, Nobel Prize laureate (d. 1941)
- November 6 – John Philip Sousa, American composer, conductor (Stars and Stripes Forever) (d. 1932)
- November 8 – Johannes Rydberg, Swedish physicist (d. 1919)
- November 13 – George Whitefield Chadwick, American composer (d. 1931)
- November 17 – Hubert Lyautey, Marshal of France (d. 1934)
- November 19 – Danske Dandridge, Danish-born American poet, historian, and garden writer (d. 1914)
- November 21 – Pope Benedict XV (d. 1922)
- November 27 – Gerhard Louis De Geer, 17th Prime Minister of Sweden (d. 1935)
- November 30 – Paul Vinogradoff, born in Russia British legal historian (d. 1925)
- December 14 – John Kemp Starley, English bicycle inventor (d. 1901)
- December 16 – Austin M. Knight, American admiral (d. 1927)
- December 22 – Takamine Jōkichi, Japanese chemist (d. 1922)
- December 24 – Thomas Stevens, English cyclist (d. 1935)

=== Undated ===
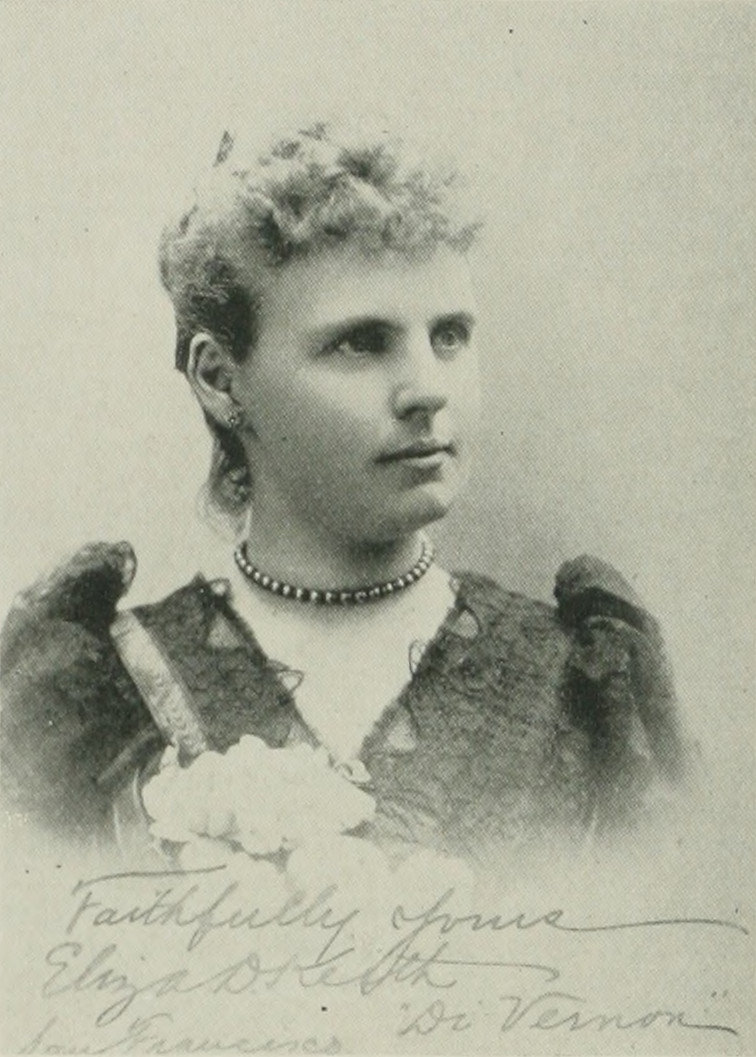
Eliza D. Keith

- Jane Clouson, teenage British murder victim (d. 1871)
- Eliza D. Keith, American educator, author, and journalist (d. 1939)
- John Francon Williams, Welsh-born journalist, writer, geographer, historian, cartographer and inventor (d. 1911)

== Deaths ==
=== January–June ===
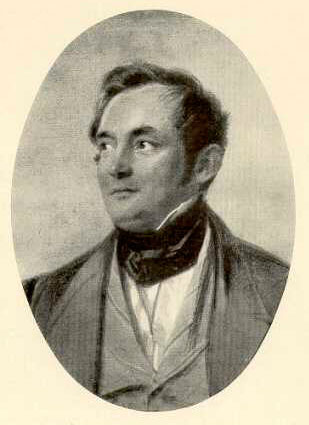
Carl Adolph von Basedow

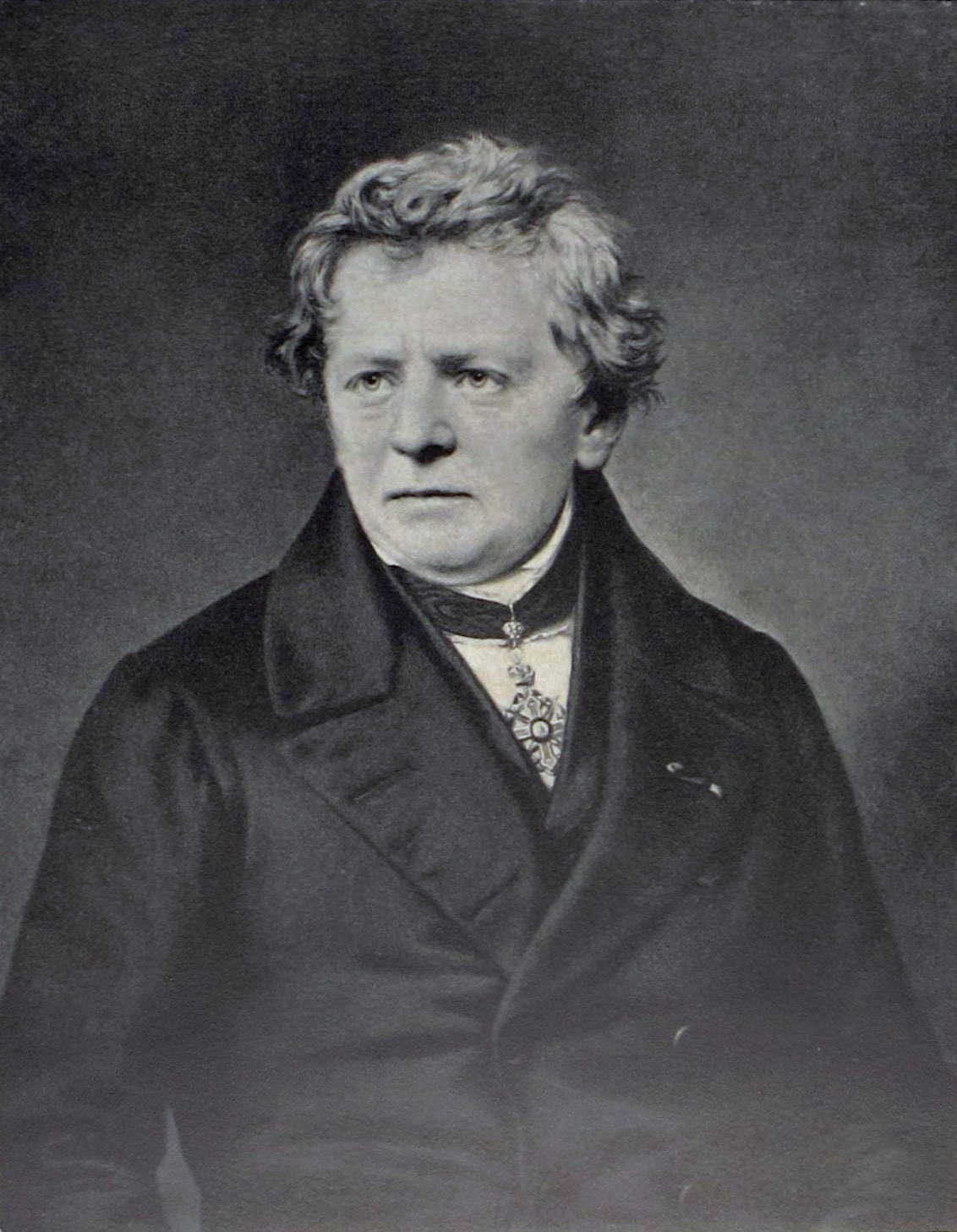
Georg Ohm

- January 8 – William Beresford, 1st Viscount Beresford, British general and politician (b. 1768)
- February 10 – José Joaquín de Herrera, President of Mexico (b. 1792)
- February 17 – John Martin, English painter (b. 1789)
- February 25 – Ann Walker, English landowner and philanthropist (b. 1803)
- March 6 – Charles Vane, 3rd Marquess of Londonderry (b. 1778)
- March 11 – Willard Richards, American religious leader (b. 1804)
- March 13
  - Sir Thomas Talfourd, English jurist (b. 1795)
  - Jean-Baptiste de Villèle, Prime Minister of France (b. 1773)
- March 18 – Alexander Allan, Scottish businessman, founder of Allan Line (b. 1780)
- March 19 – William Pope Duval, first civilian governor of Florida Territory (b. 1784)
- March 21 – Pedro María de Anaya, 2-time President of Mexico (b. 1795)
- March 26 – Emilie Hammarskjöld, Swedish-born American musician (b. 1821)
- March 27
  - William Bentinck, 4th Duke of Portland, English politician (b. 1768)
  - Charles III, Duke of Parma (b. 1823)
- April 11 – Karl Adolph von Basedow, German physician (b. 1799)
- April 15 – Arthur Aikin, English chemist, mineralogist (b. 1773)
- April 22
  - Nicolás Bravo, 3-time President of Mexico (b. 1786)
  - Domingo Eyzaguirre, Chilean philanthropist (b. 1775)
- April 29 – Henry Paget, 1st Marquess of Anglesey, British general (b. 1768)
- June 7 – Charles Baudin, French admiral (b. 1784)
- June 13 – Rosina Regina Ahles, German actor (b. 1799)

=== July–December ===
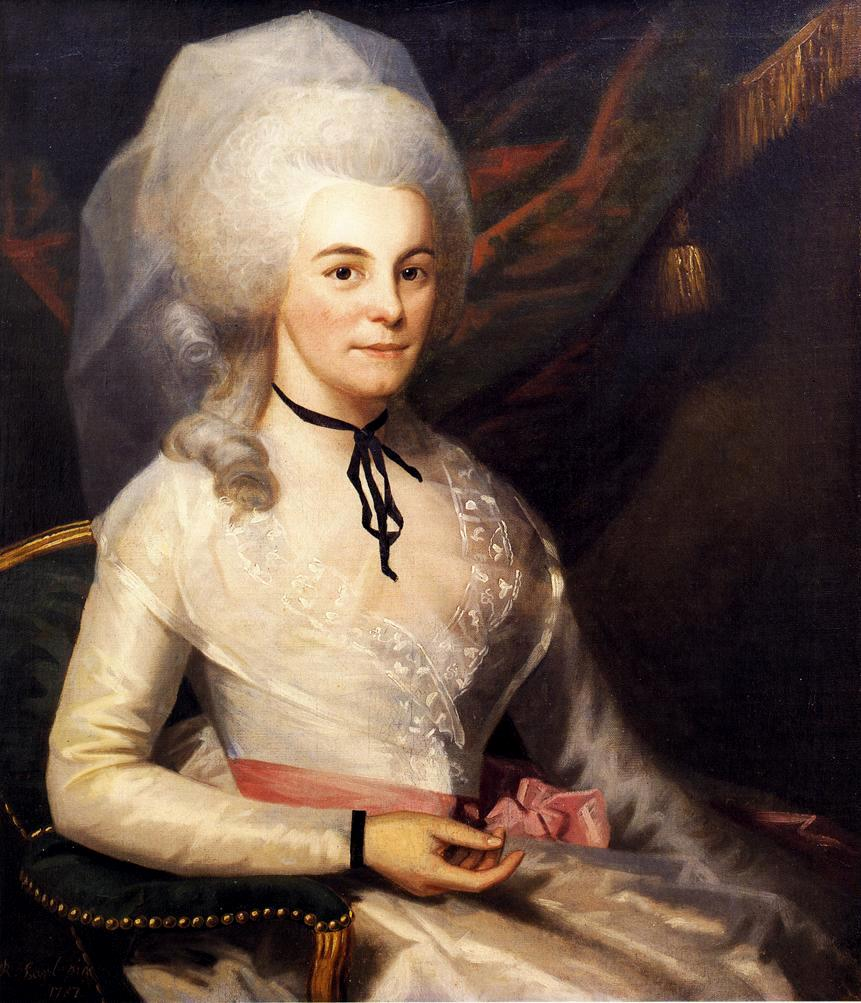
Elizabeth Schuyler Hamilton

- July 6 – Georg Ohm, German physicist (b. 1789)
- July 16 – Abbas I, Pasha of Egypt (b. 1813)
- July 31 – Samuel Wilson, American thought to be the real-life basis for Uncle Sam (b. 1766)
- August – Conquering Bear, Lakota chief (b. c. 1800)
- August 2 – Heinrich Clauren (b. 1771)
- August 3 – Qishan (b. 1786)
- August 9 – Frederick Augustus II of Saxony (b. 1797)
- August 14 – Carl Carl, Polish-born actor and theatre director (b. 1787)
- August 20 – Friedrich Wilhelm Joseph Schelling, German philosopher (b. 1775)
- August 21 – Thomas Clayton, American lawyer, politician (b. 1777)
- September 8 – Angelo Mai, Italian cardinal, philologist (b. 1782)
- September 12 – Jarvis W. Pike, former mayor of Columbus, Ohio (b. 1795)
- September 29 – Jacques Leroy de Saint-Arnaud, French general, Marshal of France, Minister of War (b. 1798)
- October 1 – Martín Perfecto de Cos, General of the Mexican Army (b. 1800)
- October 26 – Therese of Saxe-Hildburghausen, queen consort of Bavaria (b. 1792)
- November 2 – George Mogridge (Old Humphrey), British writer, poet (b. 1787)
- November 3 – Maxim Gauci, Maltese lithographer (b. 1774)
- November 9 – Elizabeth Schuyler Hamilton, philanthropist, wife of Alexander Hamilton (b. 1757)
- November 25 – John Gibson Lockhart, Scottish writer (b. 1794)
- December 9 – Almeida Garrett, Portuguese writer (b. 1799)
- December 11 – Matija Nenadović, Prime Minister of Serbia (b. 1777)
- December 15 – Kamehameha III, King of Hawaii (b. c. 1814)

=== Undated ===
- Concepción Mariño, Venezuelan heroine (b. 1790)
- Úrsula Goyzueta, Bolivian heroine (b. 1787)
- Su Sanniang, Chinese rebel (b. 1830)
