= 1911 in the United States =

- Decades: 1890s; 1900s; 1910s; 1920s; 1930s
- See also: History of the United States (1865–1918); Timeline of United States history (1900–1929); List of years in the United States

Events from the year 1911 in the United States.

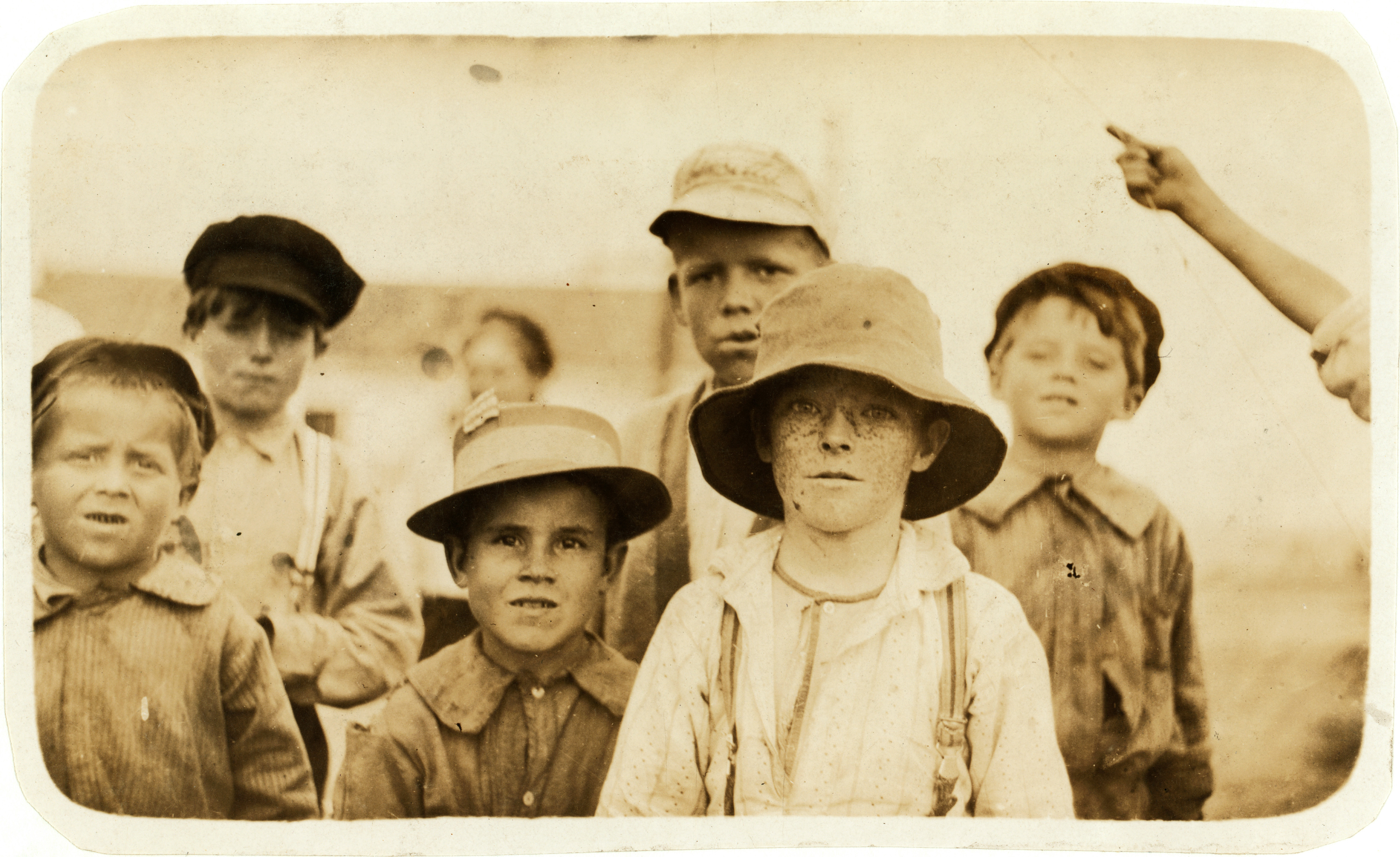
Oyster shuckers in Biloxi, Mississippi 1911. Photograph by Lewis Hine.

== Incumbents ==
=== Federal government ===
- President: William Howard Taft (R-Ohio)
- Vice President: James S. Sherman (R-New York)
- Chief Justice: Edward Douglass White (Louisiana)
- Speaker of the House of Representatives:

Joseph Gurney Cannon (R-Illinois) (until March 4)
Champ Clark (D-Missouri) (starting April 4)

- Congress: 61st (until March 4), 62nd (starting March 4)

==== State governments ====
Governors and lieutenant governors

=== Governors ===
- Governor of Alabama: B. B. Comer (Democratic) (until January 17), Emmet O'Neal (Democratic) (starting January 17)
- Governor of Arkansas: George Washington Donaghey (Democratic)
- Governor of California: James Gillett (Republican) (until January 3), Hiram Johnson (Republican) (starting January 3)
- Governor of Colorado: John F. Shafroth (Democratic)
- Governor of Connecticut: Frank B. Weeks (Republican) (until January 4), Simeon E. Baldwin (Democratic) (starting January 4)
- Governor of Delaware: Simeon S. Pennewill (Republican)
- Governor of Florida: Albert W. Gilchrist (Democratic)
- Governor of Georgia:
  - until July 1: Joseph M. Brown (Democratic)
  - July 1-November 16: Hoke Smith (Democratic)
  - starting November 16: John M. Slaton (Democratic)
- Governor of Idaho: James H. Brady (Republican) (until January 2), James H. Hawley (Democratic) (starting January 2)
- Governor of Illinois: Charles S. Deneen (Republican)
- Governor of Indiana: Thomas R. Marshall (Democratic)
- Governor of Iowa: Beryl F. Carroll (Republican)
- Governor of Kansas: Walter R. Stubbs (Republican)
- Governor of Kentucky: Augustus E. Willson (Republican) (until December 12), James B. McCreary (Democratic) (starting December 12)
- Governor of Louisiana: Jared Young Sanders, Sr. (Democratic)
- Governor of Maine: Bert M. Fernald (Republican) (until January 4), Frederick W. Plaisted (Democratic) (starting January 4)
- Governor of Maryland: Austin Lane Crothers (Democratic)
- Governor of Massachusetts: Eben Sumner Draper (Republican) (until January 5), Eugene Noble Foss (Democratic) (starting January 5)
- Governor of Michigan: Fred M. Warner (Republican) (until January 2), Chase Osborn (Republican) (starting January 2)
- Governor of Minnesota: Adolph O. Eberhart (Republican)
- Governor of Mississippi: Edmond Noel (Democratic)
- Governor of Missouri: Herbert S. Hadley (Republican)
- Governor of Montana: Edwin L. Norris (Democratic)
- Governor of Nebraska: Ashton C. Shallenberger (Democratic) (until January 5), Chester H. Aldrich (Republican) (starting January 5)
- Governor of Nevada: Denver S. Dickerson (Silver) (until January 2), Tasker L. Oddie (Republican) (starting January 2)
- Governor of New Hampshire: Henry B. Quinby (Republican) (until January 5), Robert P. Bass (Republican) (starting January 5)
- Governor of New Jersey: John Franklin Fort (Republican) (until January 17), Woodrow Wilson (Democratic) (starting January 17)
- Governor of New York: John Alden Dix (Democratic) (starting January 1)
- Governor of North Carolina: William Walton Kitchin (Democratic)
- Governor of North Dakota: John Burke (Democratic)
- Governor of Ohio: Judson Harmon (Democratic)
- Governor of Oklahoma: Charles N. Haskell (Democratic) (until January 9), Lee Cruce (Democratic) (starting January 9)
- Governor of Oregon: Jay Bowerman (Republican) (until January 11), Oswald West (Democratic) (starting January 11)
- Governor of Pennsylvania: Edwin Sydney Stuart (Republican) (until January 17), John K. Tener (Republican) (starting January 17)
- Governor of Rhode Island: Aram J. Pothier (Republican)
- Governor of South Carolina: Martin Frederick Ansel (Democratic) (until January 17), Coleman Livingston Blease (Democratic) (starting January 17)
- Governor of South Dakota: Robert S. Vessey (Republican)
- Governor of Tennessee: Malcolm R. Patterson (Democratic) (until January 26), Ben W. Hooper (Republican) (starting January 26)
- Governor of Texas: Thomas Mitchell Campbell (Democratic) (until January 17), Oscar Branch Colquitt (Democratic) (starting January 17)
- Governor of Utah: William Spry (Republican)
- Governor of Vermont: John A. Mead (Republican)
- Governor of Virginia: William Hodges Mann (Democratic)
- Governor of Washington: Marion E. Hay (Republican)
- Governor of West Virginia: William E. Glasscock (Republican)
- Governor of Wisconsin: James O. Davidson (Republican) (until January 2), Francis E. McGovern (Republican) (starting January 2)
- Governor of Wyoming: Bryant B. Brooks (Republican) (until January 2), Joseph M. Carey (Democratic) (starting January 2)

=== Lieutenant governors ===
- Lieutenant Governor of Alabama: Henry B. Gray (Democratic) (until January 17), Walter D. Seed, Sr. (Democratic) (starting January 17)
- Lieutenant Governor of California: Warren R. Porter (Republican) (until January 3), A. J. Wallace (Republican) (starting January 3)
- Lieutenant Governor of Colorado: Stephen R. Fitzgarrald (Democratic)
- Lieutenant Governor of Connecticut: vacant (until January 4), Dennis A. Blakeslee (Republican) (starting January 4)
- Lieutenant Governor of Delaware: John M. Mendinhall (Republican)
- Lieutenant Governor of Idaho: Lewis H. Sweetser (Republican)
- Lieutenant Governor of Illinois: John G. Oglesby (Republican)
- Lieutenant Governor of Indiana: Frank J. Hall (Democratic)
- Lieutenant Governor of Iowa: George W. Clarke (Republican)
- Lieutenant Governor of Kansas: William J. Fitzgerald (Republican) (until month and day unknown), Richard Joseph Hopkins (Republican) (starting month and day unknown)
- Lieutenant Governor of Kentucky: William Hopkinson Cox (Republican) (until December 12), Edward J. McDermott (Democratic) (starting December 12)
- Lieutenant Governor of Louisiana: Paul M. Lambremont (Democratic) (until month and day unknown), vacant (starting month and day unknown)
- Lieutenant Governor of Massachusetts: Louis A. Frothingham (Republican)
- Lieutenant Governor of Michigan: Patrick H. Kelley (Republican) (until January 1), John Q. Ross (Republican) (starting January 1)
- Lieutenant Governor of Minnesota: Edward Everett Smith (Republican) (until January 3), Samuel Y. Gordon (Republican) (starting January 3)
- Lieutenant Governor of Mississippi: Luther Manship (Democratic)
- Lieutenant Governor of Missouri: Jacob Friedrich Gmelich (Republican)
- Lieutenant Governor of Montana: William R. Allen (Republican)
- Lieutenant Governor of Nebraska: Melville R. Hopewell (Republican) (until May 2), vacant (starting May 2)
- Lieutenant Governor of Nevada: vacant (until January 2), Gilbert C. Ross (Democratic) (starting January 2)
- Lieutenant Governor of New York: Thomas F. Conway (Democratic) (starting January 1)
- Lieutenant Governor of North Carolina: William C. Newland (Democratic)
- Lieutenant Governor of North Dakota: Robert S. Lewis (Republican) (until month and day unknown), Usher L. Burdick (Republican) (starting month and day unknown)
- Lieutenant Governor of Ohio:
  - until January 9: Francis W. Treadway (Republican)
  - January 9-March 3: Atlee Pomerene (Democratic)
  - starting March 3: Hugh L. Nichols (Democratic)
- Lieutenant Governor of Oklahoma: George W. Bellamy (Democratic) (until month and day unknown), J. J. McAlester (Democratic) (starting month and day unknown)
- Lieutenant Governor of Pennsylvania: Robert S. Murphy (Republican) (until January 17), John Merriman Reynolds (Republican) (starting January 17)
- Lieutenant Governor of Rhode Island: Zenas Work Bliss (Republican)
- Lieutenant Governor of South Carolina: Thomas Gordon McLeod (Democratic) (until January 17), Charles Aurelius Smith (Democratic) (starting January 17)
- Lieutenant Governor of South Dakota: Howard C. Shober (Republican) (until month and day unknown), Frank M. Byrne (Republican) (starting month and day unknown)
- Lieutenant Governor of Tennessee: William Kinney (Democratic) (until month and day unknown), Nathaniel Baxter, Jr. (Democratic) (starting month and day unknown)
- Lieutenant Governor of Texas: Asbury Bascom Davidson (Democratic)
- Lieutenant Governor of Vermont: Leighton P. Slack (Republican)
- Lieutenant Governor of Virginia: James Taylor Ellyson (Democratic)
- Lieutenant Governor of Washington: vacant
- Lieutenant Governor of Wisconsin: John Strange (Republican) (until January 2), Thomas Morris (Republican) (starting January 2)

== Events ==
=== January–March ===
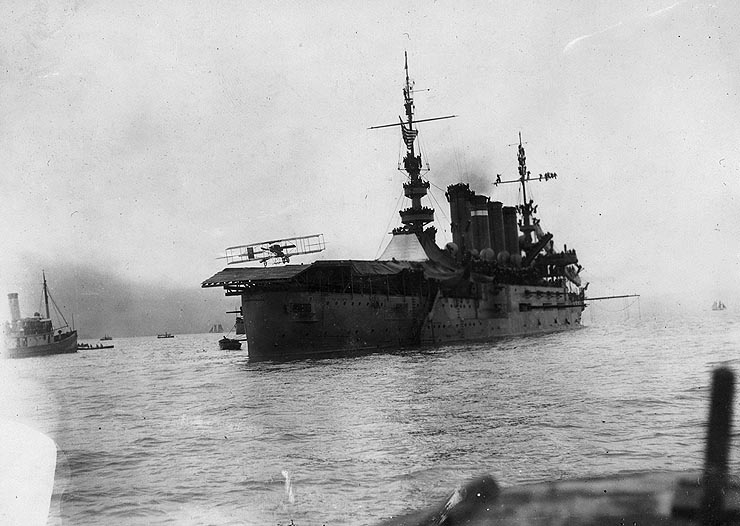
January 18: Eugene Burton Ely lands an aircraft on a ship

- January 5 – The Kappa Alpha Psi fraternity is founded at Indiana University, Bloomington, Indiana.
- January 17 – Emmet O'Neal is sworn in as the 34th governor of Alabama replacing B. B. Comer.
- January 18 – Eugene Burton Ely lands on the deck of the USS Pennsylvania stationed in San Francisco Bay, marking the first time an aircraft lands on a ship.
- January 30 – The destroyer USS Terry makes the first aeroplane rescue at sea, saving the life of John McCurdy 10 miles from Havana, Cuba.
- January – The Masses socialist magazine begins publication.
- February 5 – The Missouri State Capitol building in Jefferson City, Missouri is destroyed by fire after a bolt of lightning strikes the dome.
- March – The first installment of a serialized version of Frederick Winslow Taylor's monograph, The Principles of Scientific Management, appears in The American Magazine. The complete series runs in the March, April, and May issues, giving a boost to the efficiency movement.
- March 10 – The Kansas legislature approves House Bill Number 906, effectively the first blue sky law in the United States, culminating an effort by Joseph Norman Dolley, Kansas' banking commissioner.
- March 25 – The Triangle Shirtwaist Factory fire in New York City kills 146.
- March 29 – The United States Army formally adopts the M1911 pistol as its standard sidearm, thus giving the gun its 1911 designation.

=== April–June ===
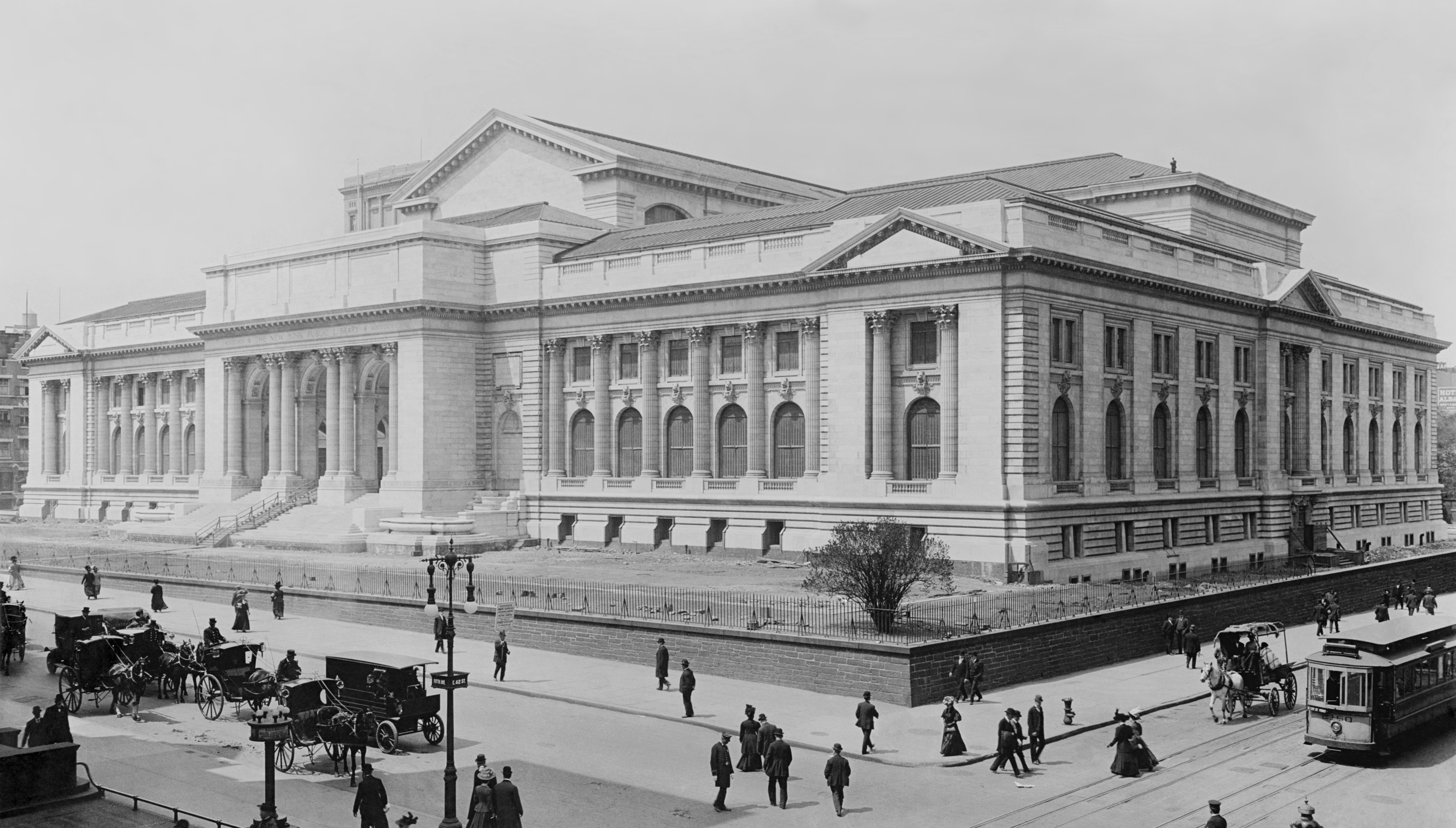
May 23: Main branch of the New York Public Library opens

- April 13 – Mexican Revolution: Rebels take Agua Prieta on the Sonora–Arizona border; government troops take the town back April 17 when the rebel leader "Red" López is drunk.
- April 17 – Southern Methodist University is chartered in Dallas, Texas.
- April 27 – Following the resignation and death of William P. Frye, a compromise is reached to rotate the office of President pro tempore of the United States Senate.
- April 30 – Sparks from a burning hayshed ignite the Great Fire of 1911, destroying much of downtown Bangor, Maine.
- May 15 – The U.S. Supreme Court declares Standard Oil to be an "unreasonable" monopoly under the Sherman Antitrust Act and orders the company to be dissolved.
- May 23 – The main branch of the New York Public Library is officially opened.
- May 24 – Colorado National Monument is established.
- May 30 – The first Indianapolis 500-mile auto race is run. The winner is Ray Harroun in the Marmon 'Wasp.'
- June 5 – Charles F. Kettering files US patent 1,150,523, for an electric Engine Starting Device.
- June 16
  - A 772-gram stony meteorite strikes earth in Columbia County, Wisconsin, near the village of Kilbourn, damaging a barn.
  - IBM is incorporated as the Computing-Tabulating-Recording Company in Endicott, New York.
- July 24 – Hiram Bingham rediscovers Machu Picchu.

=== July–September ===
- August 8 – Public Law 62-5 sets the number of representatives in the United States House of Representatives at 435 (the law takes effect in 1913).
- August 29 – Ishi, last known member of the Yana people, leaves the California wilderness.
- September 11 – Middle Tennessee State University is founded in Murfreesboro, Tennessee, as Middle Tennessee Normal School.
- September 25 – Groundbreaking for Fenway Park in Boston, Massachusetts, begins.
- September 30 – Austin Dam breaks, wiping out the town of Austin, Pennsylvania, and continuing downstream about 8 miles into the village of Costello.

=== October–December ===
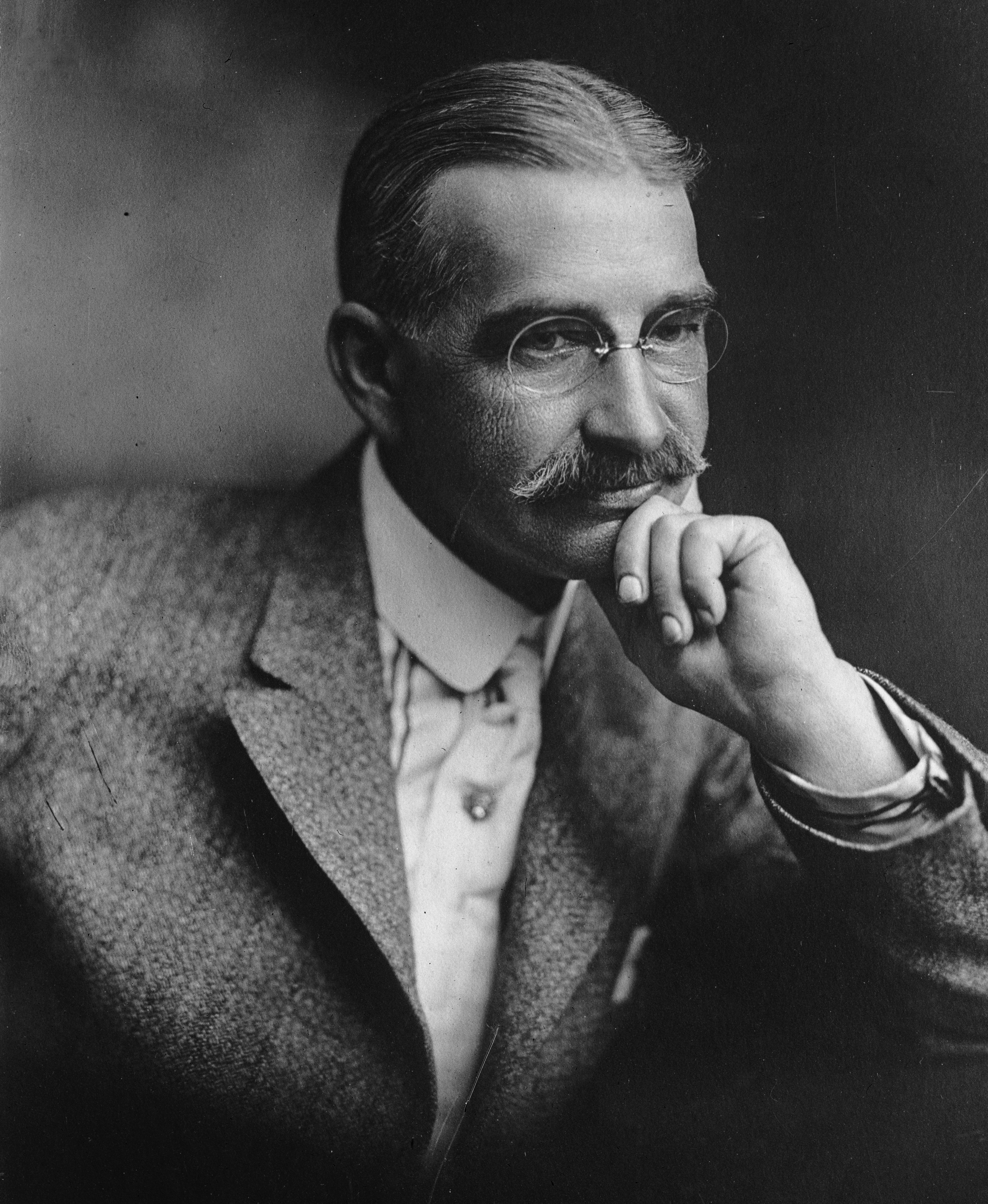
L. Frank Baum, author of The Wonderful Wizard of Oz, in a 1911 photo.

- October 7 – Outlaw Elmer McCurdy and "associates" are chased after trying to rob a train in Oklahoma. McCurdy on the run is eventually hunted down and shot by authorities. His body is never claimed and later is chemically petrified. Afterwards his remains serve as sideshow attractions in carnivals until 1976 when they are diagnosed by forensic experts to be McCurdy. McCurdy's body is finally buried in 1976 after a 65-year odyssey to the grave.
- October 24 – Orville Wright remains in the air 9 minutes and 45 seconds in a glider at Kill Devil Hills, North Carolina, setting a new world record that stands for 10 years.
- October 26 – In baseball, the Philadelphia Athletics defeat the New York Giants, 13–2, to win the 1911 World Series in six games. The game is tied 1–1 after three innings, but with four runs in the fourth, and seven runs in the seventh, the As demolish the Giants.
- October 28 – The Rosicrucian Fellowship's international headquarters opens at Mount Ecclesia, Oceanside, California (preceded by its formal constitution on August 8, 1909, at Seattle, Washington).
- November 3 – Chevrolet officially enters the automobile market to compete with the Ford Model T.
- November 11
  - The Great Blue Norther of 11/11/11: A record cold snap hits the United States Midwest; many cities break record highs and lows on the same day.
  - The Upton Machine Company, now Whirlpool Corporation, was founded in St Joseph, MI.
- November 17 – The Omega Psi Phi fraternity is founded at Howard University.
- December 24 – The Lackawanna Cutoff, the first of two major cutoffs built by the Delaware, Lackawanna and Western Railroad, opens just 3 years after it was built.

=== Ongoing ===
- Progressive Era (1890s–1920s)
- Lochner era (c. 1897–c. 1937)

== Births ==
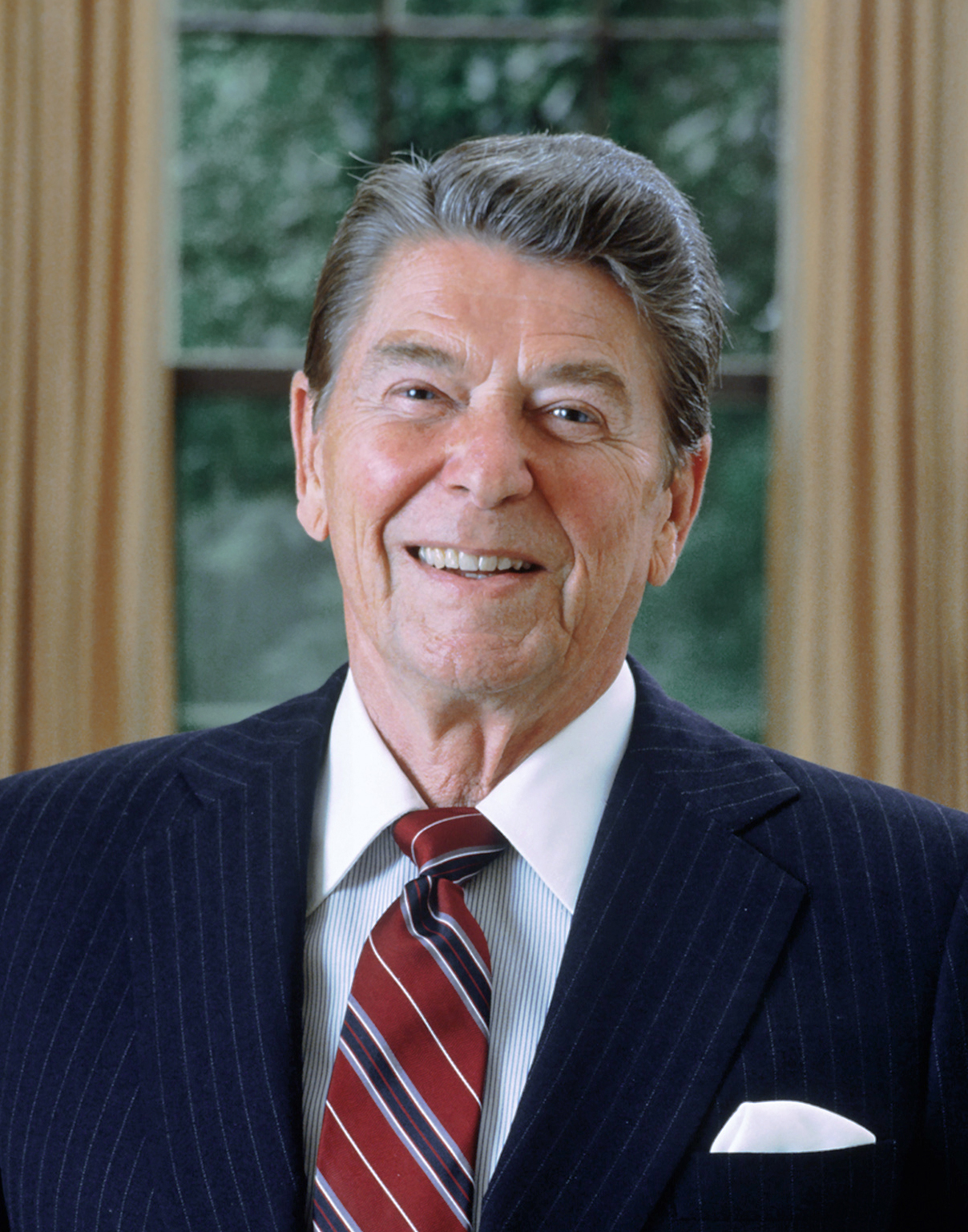
Ronald Reagan

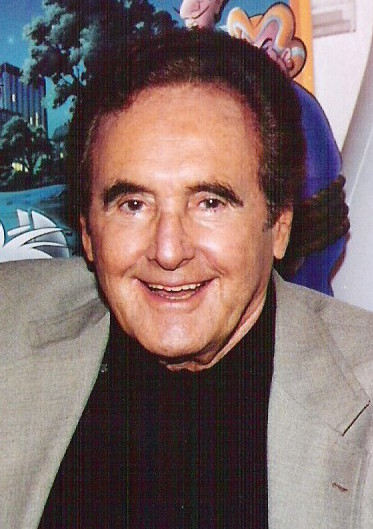
Joseph Barbera

- January 3 – Al Sack, conductor, composer and violinist (died 1947)
- January 9 – Slim Gaillard, jazz musician (died 1991)
- January 19 – Ken Nelson, record producer and music executive (died 2008)
- January 30 – Hugh Marlowe, actor (died 1982)
- February 6 – Ronald Reagan, film actor, 33rd governor of California from 1967 to 1975 and 40th president of the United States from 1981 to 1989 (died 2004)
- February 12 – Stephen H. Sholes, recording executive (died 1968)
- February 13 – Jean Muir, actress (died 1996)
- March 9 – Ebby Halliday, American realtor (died 2015)
- March 13
  - L. Ron Hubbard, science fiction author, founder of Scientology (died 1986)
  - Marie Rudisill, American TV and radio personality (died 2006)
- March 18
  - Al Benton, baseball player (died 1968)
  - William Lava, composer (died 1971)
- March 24
  - Joseph Barbera, cartoonist (died 2006)
  - Ephraim Engleman, rheumatologist (died 2015)
- March 25 – Jack Ruby, assassin of Lee Harvey Oswald (died 1967)
- March 26 – Tennessee Williams, playwright (died 1983)
- March 31 – Freddie Green, jazz musician (died 1987)
- April 8 – Melvin Calvin, chemist, winner of the Nobel Prize in Chemistry in 1961 (died 1997)
- April 13 – Donald Leslie, creator of the Leslie speaker (died 2004)
- April 17 – Lester Rodney, journalist (died 2009)
- April 18 – Huntington Hartford, businessman (died 2008)
- May 6 – Frank Nelson, actor (died 1986)
- May 8 – Robert Johnson, Mississippi blues guitar player and singer-songwriter (died 1938)
- May 11 – Doodles Weaver, actor and singer (died 1983)
- May 24 – Carleen Hutchins, violin maker (died 2009)
- May 25 – Eric P. Newman, numismatist (died 2017)
- May 27 – Hubert Humphrey, 38th vice president of the United States from 1965 to 1969 and U.S. Senator from Minnesota from 1949 to 1964 and from 1971 to 1978 (died 1978)
- June 5 – John C. Woods, US Army executioner (died in accident 1950 in the Marshall Islands)
- June 9 – Hawley Pratt, film director, animator and illustrator (died 1999)
- June 11 – Norman Malcolm, philosopher (died 1990)
- June 13 – Luis Walter Alvarez, physicist, winner of the Nobel Prize in Physics in 1968 (died 1988)
- June 21
  - Irving Fein, television and film producer (died 2012)
  - Wonderful Smith, comedian (died 2008)
- June 23 – Hannah Weinstein, journalist, political activist and television producer (died 1984)
- June 24 – Norman Lessing, television screenwriter, producer, playwright and chess player (died 2001)
- June 25 – William Howard Stein, chemist, winner of the Nobel Prize in Chemistry in 1972 (died 1980)
- June 26 – Babe Didrikson Zaharias, athlete and golfer (died 1956)
- June 27 – Ben Alexander, actor (died 1969)
- June 28 – Thalia Mara, ballet dancer, educator and author (d. 2003)
- July 1 – Guy Raymond, actor (died 1997)
- July 2
  - Fred Beaver, Muscogee Creek-Seminole painter and muralist (died 1980)
  - Dorothy M. Horstmann, epidemiologist, virologist and pediatrician (died 2001)
- July 3 – Herbert E. Grier, electrical engineer (died 1999)
- July 4 – Frederick Seitz, solid-state physicist (died 2008)
- July 6 – June Gale, actress (died 1996)
- July 7 – Joan Perry, actress, model and singer (died 1996)
- July 8
  - John Ball, novelist (died 1988)
  - Fred Kohler Jr., actor (died 1993)
- July 11 – Hyacinth Gabriel Connon, American-Filipino Lasallian Brother (died 1978 in the Philippines)
- July 14 – William Norris, business executive (died 2006)
- July 15 – Paul Zoll, cardiologist (died 1999)
- July 18 – Arch MacDonald, broadcast journalist and television pioneer (died 1985)
- July 19 – Ben Eastman, Olympic middle-distance runner (died 2002)
- July 26 – Jerry Burke, musician (died 1965)
- July 31 – George Liberace, musician (died 1983)
- August 2 – Rusty Wescoatt, actor (died 1987)
- August 8 – Rosetta LeNoire, actress (died 2002)
- August 9 – William A. Fowler, physicist, winner of the Nobel Prize in Physics in 1983 (died 1995)
- August 13 – Roy Pinney, herpetologist, photographer, war correspondent and writer (died 2010)
- August 15 – Anthony Salerno, gangster (died 1992)
- August 22 – Joe Hickey, politician and jurist, governor and senator from Wyoming (died 1970)
- August 24 – Durward Kirby, American television host and announcer (died 2000)
- September 6 – Harry Danning, baseball player (died 2004)
- September 8 – Byron Morrow, actor (died 2006)
- September 15 – Joseph Pevney, film and television director (died 2008)
- September 21 – Clair Engle, U.S. Senator from California from 1959 to 1964 (died 1964)
- September 23 – Jane Hadley Barkley, Second Lady of the United States (died 1964)
- September 24 – Ed Kretz, motorcycle racer (died 1996)
- September 30 – Ruth Gruber, journalist (died 2016)
- October 21 – William A. Mitchell, food chemist and inventor (died 2004)
- October 27 – Leif Erickson, American actor (died 1986)
- October 30 – Ruth Hussey, actress (died 2005)
- December 1 – Walter Alston, baseball player and manager (died 1984)
- December 10 – Chet Huntley, television reporter (died 1974)
- December 20 – Hortense Calisher, author (died 2009)
- December 26 – Steve Kordek, pinball innovator (died 2012)
- December 28 – Sam Levenson, humorist and author (died 1980)

== Deaths ==
- January 7 – William Hall Sherwood, pianist and music educator (born 1854)
- January 9 – Edwin Arthur Jones, choral composer (born 1853)
- January 24 – David Graham Phillips, journalist and novelist, murdered (born 1867)
- February 1 – Charles Stillman Sperry, admiral (born 1847)
- February 7 – Hannah Whitall Smith, Quaker author (born 1832)
- February 22 – Frances Harper, African American abolitionist, poet and author (born 1825)
- March 4 – Ellen Maria Colfax, Second Lady of the United States (born 1836)
- March 18 – David Moffat, financier (born 1839)
- April 13 – William Keith, landscape painter (born 1838 in Scotland)
- April 14
  - George Cary Eggleston, memoirist (born 1839)
  - Addie Joss, baseball player (born 1880)
  - Denman Thompson, actor and playwright (born 1833)
- May 5
  - James A. Bland, African American musician and songwriter (born 1854)
  - Halsey Ives, art teacher and curator (born 1847)
- May 9 – Thomas Wentworth Higginson, writer, abolitionist and advocate of women's suffrage (born 1823)
- May 21 – Williamina Fleming, astronomer (born 1857 in Scotland)
- May 22 – Elizabeth Smith Miller, women's rights campaigner (born 1822)
- May 30 – Milton Bradley, game pioneer and businessman (born 1836)
- June 9 – Carrie Nation, temperance activist (born 1846)
- June 27 – Elizabeth Litchfield Cunnyngham, missionary and church worker (born 1831)
- July 2
  - Mary M. Cohen, American social economist and proto-feminist (born 1854)
  - Clement A. Evans, Confederate general (born 1833)
- July 24 – Thomas J. Latham, lawyer and businessman (born 1831)
- August 1 – Samuel Arza Davenport, politician (born 1843)
- August 7 – Elizabeth Akers Allen, author, journalist and poet (born 1832)
- August 8 – William P. Frye, U.S. Senator (born 1830)
- August 11 – Verner Clarges, silent film actor (born 1846)
- August 26 – Alfred Bayliss, English-American educator (born 1847)
- September 9 – Francis March, lexicographer and philologist (born 1825)
- October 2 – Winfield Scott Schley, admiral (born 1839)
- October 7 – Elmer McCurdy, robber, killed in shootout (born 1880)
- October 14 – John Marshall Harlan, U.S. Supreme Court Justice (born 1833)
- October 17 – Abram Williams, U.S. Senator from California from 1886 to 1887 (born 1832)
- October 19 – Eugene Ely, aviation pioneer (born 1886)
- October 24
  - Ida Lewis, lighthouse keeper (born 1842)
  - Helene Knabe, Indiana doctor (born 1875 in Eastern Prussia)
- October 29 – Joseph Pulitzer, newspaper publisher and journalist (born 1847 in Hungary)
- October 31 – John Joseph Montgomery, glider pioneer (born 1858)
- November 8 – Oscar Bielaski, Major League Baseball player (born 1847)
- November 15 – Philip Gengembre Hubert, architect (born 1830 in France)
- December 2 – George Davidson, geodesist, astronomer, geographer, surveyor and engineer (born 1825 in the United Kingdom)
- December 21 – Benjamin F. Jonas, U.S. Senator from Louisiana from 1879 to 1885 (born 1834)
- December 20 – Rose Eytinge, actress (born 1835)
- December 25 – Arthur F. Griffith, calculating prodigy (born 1880)

== See also ==
- List of American films of 1911
- Timeline of United States history (1900–1929)
