= Arthur F. Griffith =

American calculating prodigy (1880–1911)

- Born: July 30, 1880; Milford, Kosciusko County, Indiana, US
- Died: December 25, 1911 (aged 31); Springfield, Massachusetts, US

Arthur Frederick Griffith (30 July 1880 – 25 December 1911) was a calculating prodigy born July 30, 1880, in Milford, Kosciusko County, Indiana. He could count to 40,000 by age five. An illness at age seven resulted in epilepsy and prevented him from attending school until age 10. At age 12, he began to develop calculating short cuts. He dropped out of school at age 17, but continued to study numbers and practice mental calculation on his own.

At age 19, he met Dr. Ernest Hiram Lindley, who invited Arthur to Indiana University to be studied in the psychology laboratory which had been established in 1892 by Dr. William Lowe Bryan. Bryan and Lindley took Arthur to the American Psychological Association meeting at Yale in December 1899, where he exhibited his skills and the I.U. professors presented a paper about their research of Arthur's case. William Lowe Bryan, in 1900, presented a similar paper at the meeting of the International Congress of Psychology in Paris.

Arthur Griffith left Indiana University after five months, wrote a book of his methods, entitled The Easy and Speedy Reckoner, and toured the vaudeville circuit until his death, allegedly of a stroke, in a Springfield, Massachusetts hotel room at age 31 on Christmas Day, 1911.
