= Helene Knabe =

Indiana doctor and murder victim (1875–1911)

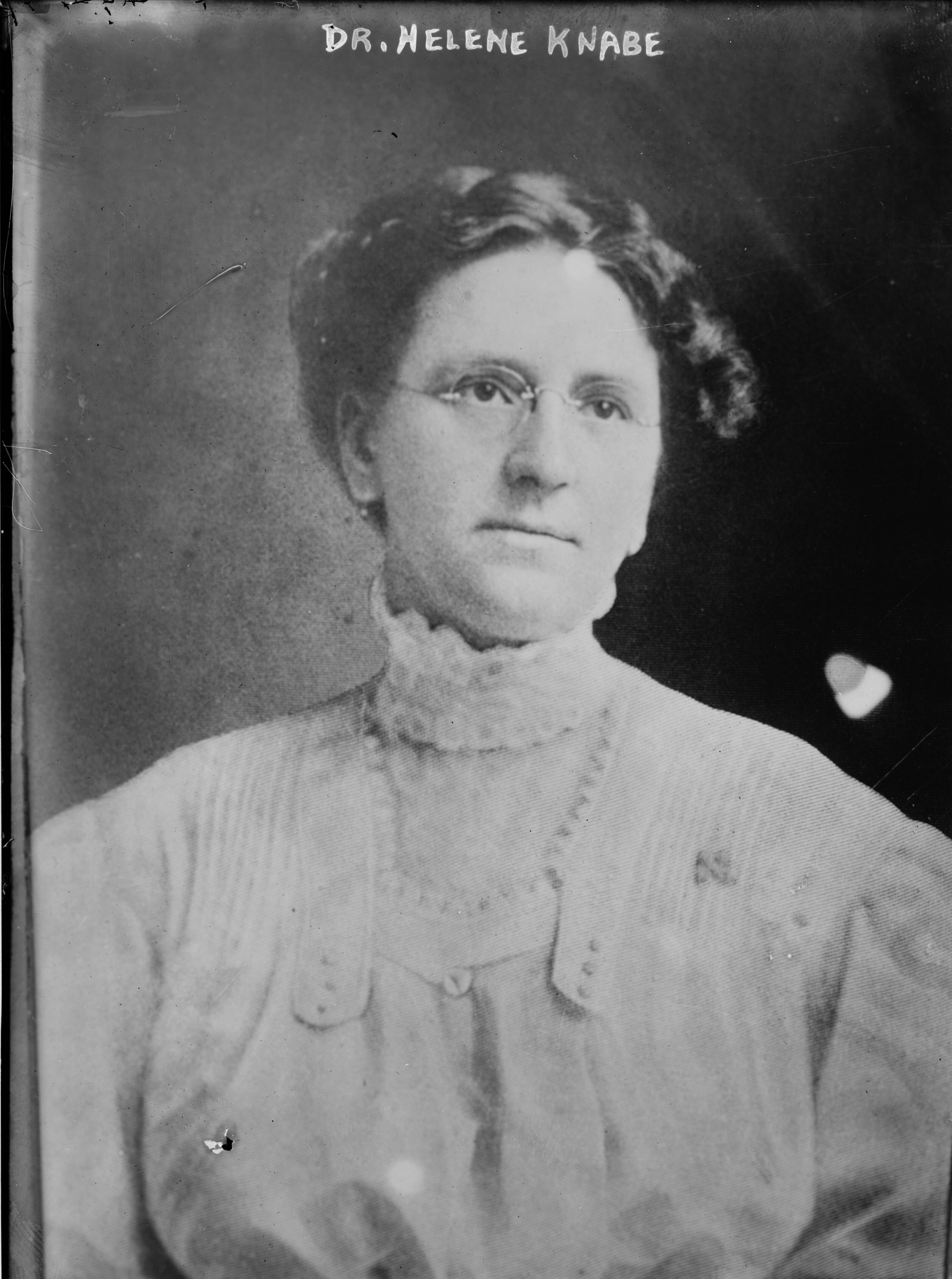
- Born: December 22, 1875; Rügenwalde, Eastern Prussia
- Died: October 24, 1911 (aged 35); Indianapolis, Indiana

Helene Elise Hermine Knabe (December 22, 1875–October 24, 1911) was a German-American doctor, teacher, and murder victim. The Woman's Medical Journal reported her death, describing her as "formerly state bacteriologist of Indiana, at Indianapolis, on October 24th. Dr. Knabe's untimely death at the age of 35 deprives the medical profession of an enthusiastic worker in the field of hygiene and sanitation; one whose excellent qualities endeared her to her many friends."

== Life, career, and murder ==
Born in what is now Germany, Knabe emigrated to the U.S. in 1896, landing in New York. Trained at the Medical College of Indiana, she became a state deputy health officer, assistant state pathologist, and assistant superintendent of the Indiana State Board of Health bacteriological and pathological department. She later served as chair of hematology and parasitology at the Indiana Veterinary College (IVC).

A laboratory assistant found her dead in her apartment, with her throat cut, lying in an odd position on the bed.

Her death in 1911 was initially called a suicide. The local women's club funded an independent investigation. This resulted in murder charges against William B. Craig, the dean of students at the IVC, and Alonzo Ragsdale, an undertaker. The charges were later dropped, and the case remains officially unsolved. The Women's Medical Club of Chicago gave a memorial tea in her honor in 1913.
