= Mute Rebellion =

Series of riots

The Mute rebellion (Swedish: Muteupproret) was a series of riots that occurred in Halland, Sweden between November 1854 and February 1855. The riots started in Himle Hundred near Mute. A government official, Fredrik Kjellman, had arrived in Mute with his assistants to investigate trade violations. The regulations banned shops from operating within three miles of the city. Kjellman's visit triggered riots that continued for several weeks before being subdued by the military. In 1864, the Swedish government rescinded the regulations, allowing free commerce.
