= John Riley Banister =

American lawman (1854–1918)

John R. Banister as a young man, posed for a "tin type" photograph.

John Riley Banister with Luther Alred (Oklahoma, November 11, 1911)

John Riley Banister (May 24, 1854 – 1918) was an American law officer, cowboy and Texas Ranger.

== Early years ==
Banister was born on May 24, 1854, in Banister Hollow, a small settlement located in Camden County, Missouri, which was to become a local hub or center for surrounding communities. His parents were William Lawrence and Mary (Buchanan) Banister. According to biographical sources, all the Banisters were musicians and played fiddle, banjo, guitar and other instruments. They also sang long ballads and played Irish and Scottish jigs and reels.

Around 1863 John's father, after being wounded twice while serving in the Confederate Army, did not return home and instead moved to Texas and married Mary Catherine Miller, a young woman of mixed British and Native American descent, with whom he had six other children. Whether or not William had formally ended his marriage with Buchanan prior to marrying Miller is a fact not noted in any historical record.

== Move to Texas ==
What inspired Banister to leave Banister Hollow is not clear, although oral history suggests that it was in part due to his mother's unhappiness and abusive treatment from an uncle named Argiles Hicks. Further anecdotal evidence suggests that the wild, chaotic nature of the region was also an influence, as, according to Leona Bruce, mobs and guerillas were a constant threat. Furthermore, the attraction to the West, the land where Banister's father had gone before, may have been the strongest impetus. Banister, at age thirteen, along with his brother, Will (who was named after their father) decided to leave their home to seek out their father in Texas.

Not having a map or any kind of predefined route, one Spring night in 1867 the two boys did not return home from hunting at the Niangua River. This timing was chosen because the boys understood that their leaving would not have been permitted by their family and their grandfather would have followed them and punish them had he had sufficient warning.

There is no historical or anecdotal record to suggest that the boys ever set foot in Banister Hollow again. Nor is there record to show how John and Will Banister traveled or what transpired during that time, although there is record of the boys asking other passing travelers at the earlier stages of their journey questions about how and where to cross the rivers, what kind of storms normally occurred in the Spring, how to plan a route and stay on track and where there might be danger from Native Americans. They traveled nearly six-hundred miles alone, armed with only a single rifle, a small amount of lead and powder, and a bag of Banister Hollow cornmeal. Four months after leaving Banister Hollow, the boys arrived in Fort Worth, Texas, a well-known town that was a source of supplies for settlements in the surrounding region.

== Adoption ==
After arriving in Fort Worth, Banister and his brother, after inquiring after their father from many strangers, were befriended by a man named Colonel Rufus Winn, who was a Confederate veteran. Winn, who had two young children with his wife, Mary Elizabeth Vaughn, was touched by the boys' tale and was concerned for their safety. Not wanting them to join outlaws, Winn and his wife took them in. On the Rufus Winn ranch Banister assisted Winn with all manner of chores and duties, and within a short time became a vital family and community member.

== From cattle driving to catching outlaws ==
After driving cattle for the Rufus Winn Ranch near Menardville and later the Sam Golson ranch in Coleman and Mason counties, Banister joined the Texas Rangers in Austin, Texas for Frontier Battalion service, which involved escorting murderer John Wesley Hardin to Comanche for trial, and later the capture of outlaw Sam Bass.

After leaving ranger service in 1881, John Banister moved to San Saba and returned to cattle driving until 1883, making drives to Kansas. In 1883 Banister married Mary Ellen Walker and settled on a ranch near Brownwood. After moving to Coleman to run a livery stable, the couple had six children. Mrs. Banister died in 1892, and Banister married Emma Daugherty on September 25, 1894, in Goldthwaite. Banister and Daugherty had five children.

== Special assignment, field-inspection, sheriff ==
Between 1889 and 1892, Banister accepted special assignments as a detective for the Santa Fe and other railroads. In 1892, he became a Treasury Agent assigned to help police the U.S.-Mexico border against cattle smugglers. After six years, he resigned and became an inspector for the Texas Cattle Raisers Association (now the Texas and Southwestern Cattle Raisers Association). He originated the field-inspection service for the association and was its first chief. Banister investigated cattle rustling for the association in Texas, New Mexico, Kansas, and Oklahoma until 1914, when he became sheriff of Coleman County.

Banister's career is documented by a collection of his papers in the Southwest Collection of Texas Tech University. Documents detailing his investigations of cattle theft are particularly valuable in detailing the longtime efforts of the cattlemen's association in protecting livestock. Banister died of a stroke on August 1, 1918, in Coleman, and was buried in Santa Anna. His wife then took over his job and in so doing became one of the first female sheriffs in the United States.
