= Powhattan (1837) =

Ship, wrecked in 1854

History

United States
- Launched: 1837
- In service: February 2, 1837
- Fate: Wrecked April 16, 1854

General characteristics
- Type: Three Masted
- Tons burthen: 598 7/95
- Length: 132 ft 10 in (40.49 m)
- Beam: 31 ft 7 in (9.63 m)
- Propulsion: Sail
- Sail plan: Square Rigged

The Powhattan or Powhatan was an American ship that is best remembered as one of the New Jersey shipwrecks with the greatest loss of life. The number of victims varies, according to sources, between 200 and 365.

The Powhattan was an emigrant ship transport 598 tons gross. It was registered as a new vessel on February 2, 1837, with W. Graham as owner and D. Griffith as master (captain). The ship was built in Baltimore, Maryland, in 1836–1837 and made several trips across the Atlantic from England, France and the Netherlands to the ports of Baltimore and New York.

About the first of March 1854, the Powhattan sailed from the port of Le Havre, France, destined for New York City. It was carrying more than 200 German emigrants. After encountering a storm off the New Jersey coast it went aground about 5:00 p.m. on April 15, 1854, on the shoals near Harvey Cedars, New Jersey (latitude 39 33 00 North −74 13 00 West), about six miles south of the Harvey Cedars Lifesaving Station. The ship remained afloat until the following day, April 16, 1854, whereupon it broke apart resulting in the deaths of the entire crew and passengers. At the time of the accident, the ship was commanded by Captain James Meyers (or Myers) of Baltimore. The victims washed onto the beach as far south as Atlantic City, where they were buried in three cemeteries. Fifty-four were interred in a mass grave at Smithville Methodist Church and 45 were buried in Absecon. The majority of the bodies, about 140, washed ashore at Peahala on Long Beach Island. These victims were buried in pauper's graves in the Baptist cemetery in nearby Manahawkin. The cemetery now includes "The Unknown from the Sea" monument erected by the State of New Jersey in 1904 honoring all the victims of the Powhattan shipwreck. The Powhattan disaster served as an impetus for the purchase of the site for the Absecon Lighthouse later in 1854.

== Voyages from 1837 to 1854 ==
Departure date	Port of departure	Arrival date	Port of arrival	Master	Purpose
July 25, 1837	Le Havre, France	September 4, 1837	Baltimore?	Griffith	Transport British and Irish immigrants
Unknown	Mobile, Alabama	October 13, 1837	Baltimore?	Griffith	Unknown
Unknown	Liverpool, England	May 2, 1838	Baltimore	Griffith	Unknown
Unknown	Liverpool, England	June 21, 1846	Baltimore	Haydon	Irish and British immigrants
Unknown	Le Havre, France	January 1, 1847	New Orleans	Stone	207 passengers
Unknown	Le Havre, France	July 31, 1847	Unknown	Unknown	Unknown
Unknown	Liverpool, England	Dec 2nd, 1847	Baltimore	???	Irish immigrants
Unknown	Le Havre, France	May 5, 1848	New York	Unknown	German immigrants
Unknown	Le Havre, France	April 2, 1852	New York	Unknown	French, Swiss
Unknown	Rotterdam, Netherlands	November 29, 1853	New York	Myers	Dutch and German immigrants

== Sources ==
- Great Storms of the Jersey Shore, by Larry Savadove and Margaret Thomas Buchholz, published by Down the Shore, 1993
- The New York Times April 21, 1854
- The Baltimore Sun, April 21, 1854, Friday morning edition
- The Daily Alta California, May 19, 1854
- A Heavy Sea Running: The Formation of the U.S. Life-Saving Service, 1846–1878 By Dennis R. Means, Winter 1987, Vol. 19, No. 4
- Brigantine Beach, New Jersey website
- New Jersey Museum of Boating, Inc., Bay Head, New Jersey
- Maritime Heritage Project www.MaritimeHeritage.org, Post Office Box 2878, Sausalito, California, 94966
- Immigrant Ships Transcribers Guild
- Proceedings of the New Jersey Historical Society, 1884, published January 17, 1884, page 82–83
