= Mary M. Cohen =

American journalist (1854–1911)

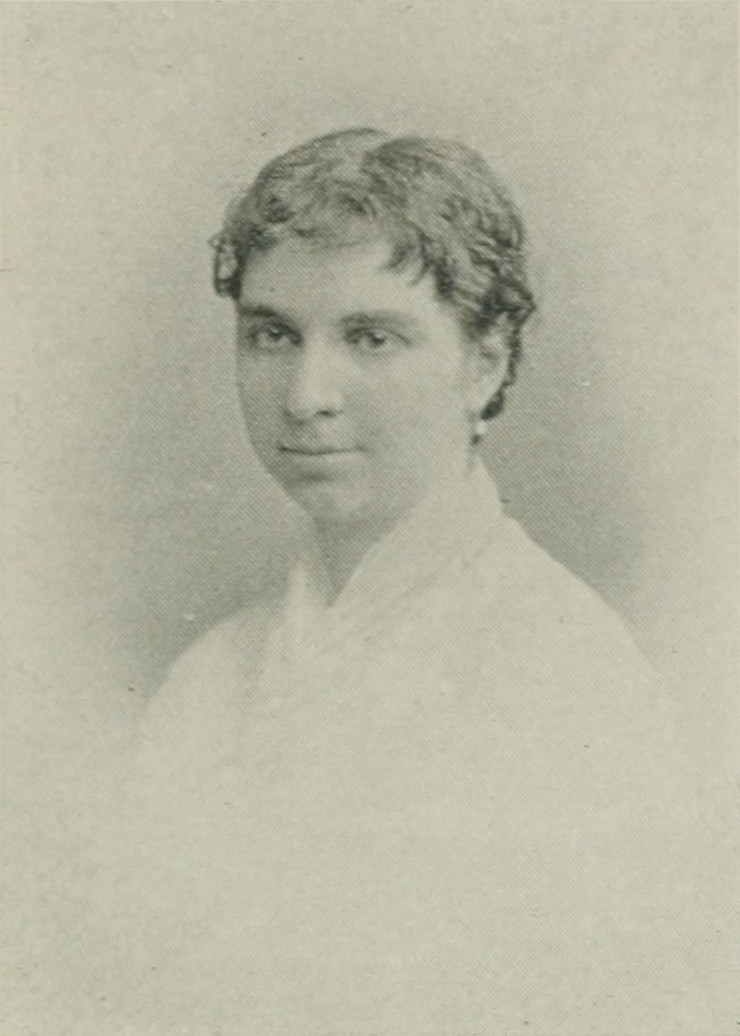
- Photo in A Woman of the Century
- Born: Mary Matilda Cohen; February 26, 1854; Philadelphia, Pennsylvania, U.S.
- Died: July 2, 1911 (aged 57); Atlantic City, New Jersey
- Education: Miss Ann Dickson's private school, Miss Catherine Lyman's school
- Occupations: social economist, journalist, belletrist, educationist, communal worker, proto-feminist
- Writing career
- Pen name: Coralie

Mary M. Cohen (pen name, Coralie; February 26, 1854 – July 2, 1911) was an American social economist, journalist, belletrist, educator, communal worker, and proto-feminist of the long nineteenth century. She was also an artist, wood-carver, stenographer, typewriter, and a successful teacher. Cohen was a prominent contributor to religious periodicals. She filled a number of responsible positions in various philanthropic societies.

== Early life and education ==
Mary Matilda Cohen was born in Philadelphia, Pennsylvania, February 26, 1854. She was the second daughter of Henry and Matilda Cohen, a prominent Jewish family. Henry Cohen was born in London, England, in 1810, came to the United States in 1844 and went into business in Philadelphia, where he died in 1879. He was identified with many Jewish and unsectarian philanthropic societies. Mrs. Cohen was born in Liverpool, England. She was prominent in charitable work.

Mary attended Miss Ann Dickson's private school in Philadelphia until she was fourteen years old, where she learned French, English, Latin, and sketching. She subsequently transferred to Miss Catherine Lyman's school to pursue her education. After leaving school, she took a course in literature under Professor Chase, and studied German for three years. From the age of seven, she was taught in music by her mother until prepared for instruction from masters. She began to write short stories when she was thirteen years old.

== Career ==
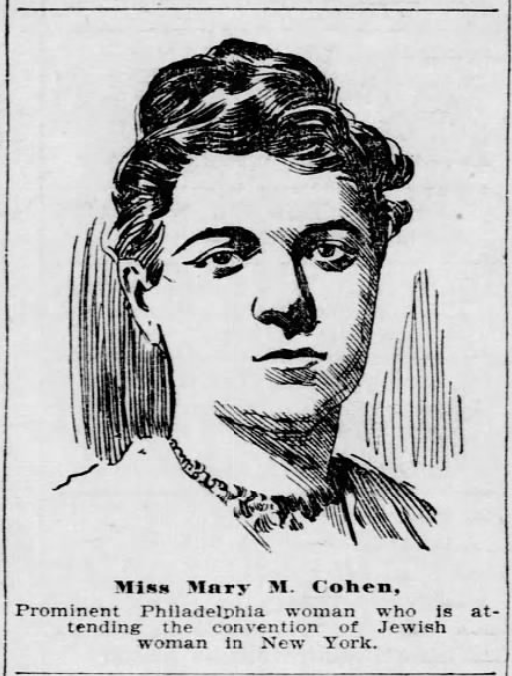
Mary M. Cohen (1896 sketch)

Her first printed essay, "Religion Tends to Cheerfulness", appeared in the Jewish Index, and she subsequently became a prominent contributor to religious periodicals, both Jewish and Christian, writing under the pen-name "Coralie." She edited sketches of celebrated men and women for publications; handled general literature in prose and in poetry, and questions belonging to the sphere of Judaism with equal ability; she contributed articles on the status and important roles assumed by Hebrews and Hebrew women, besides stories and reviews to Jewish, secular, and Christian religious journals of various cities. Among these writings, were "Orthodox and Reform Jews;" "The Synagogue and the Jewess;" a poem in honor of Sir Moses Montefiore; "The Influence of Faith;" "Hebrew Women;" "Jewish Working Girls;" studies of Robert Browning's poems, among them "Rabbi Ben Ezra," "Saul," and "Jochanan Ha Kadosh" (the Holy); "Miss Hattie;" "A Book That Has Helped Me," being a review of "The Story of Avis", by Elizabeth Stuart Phelps Ward; and a paper on Emma Lazarus's writings. At the Hebrew Women's Congress, held in Chicago during the World's Columbian Exhibition, in 1893, Cohen read her paper on "The Influence of the Jewish Religion on the Home;" and another, on "What Judaism has done for the Theological Emancipation of Women," before the Unitarian Congress in Chicago during the same Exhibition. She also edited "The Diary and Letters of Louisa B. Hart," together with a memoir of Miss Hart.

She visited Europe three times and filled a number of responsible positions in various philanthropic societies. Cohen served as the president of the Browning Club of Philadelphia, of which she was the founder, as the corresponding secretary of the Jewish Publication Society of America, as a superintendent of the Southern Hebrew Sunday-school, as president of the society under whose direction the schools are conducted, as a member of some of the lending literary and art clubs of Philadelphia, such as the Contemporary Club, the Fairmount Park Association, and as a member of the board of directors of the Pennsylvania Museum and School of Industrial Art. When the New Century Club was formed by the executive committee of the Women's Centennial Commission, after the Exposition of 1876 was closed, Cohen became a member, and was subsequently elected to the executive board. For a year, she had charge of the writing class organized by the New Century Guild, and for three years directed a Browning class. In November 1888, that class developed into an independent society, which developed a membership of nearly 600 men and women of Philadelphia. Cohen was also a member of the American Social Science Association, placed in the social economy department.

In 1884, Cohen was invited by Rev. Dr. H. L. Wayland, one of the directors of the American Social Science Association, to present to that organization a paper on "Hebrew Charities". The paper was read by its author before the convention held in Saratoga Springs, New York, September 12, 1884, was favorably received, discussed and published. On other occasions, Cohen read papers on such topics as "Personality as a Moving Power;" "The Balance of Power Between Industrial and Intellectual Work;" and "Interdependence of the Poetic and Critical Faculties."

Cohen received her religious inspiration from Rev. Dr. Sabato Morais. Cohen was chosen to serve on the Philadelphia committee of the Columbian Exposition, in the department of social economy. She worked for the Hebrew Sunday School; first, as an instructor in its Northern branch, and subsequently as Superintendent of its Southern Sunday School. She also provided services for the Young Women's Union and other charitable, educational, and social institutions. She was a member of the first Executive Committee, and afterwards Corresponding Secretary of the Jewish Publication Society of America. She was a member of the Committee on Religion of the National Council of Jewish Women.

== Death ==
Mary M. Cohen died in Atlantic City, New Jersey on July 2, 1911.
