= John Lee Carroll =

American politician (1830–1911)

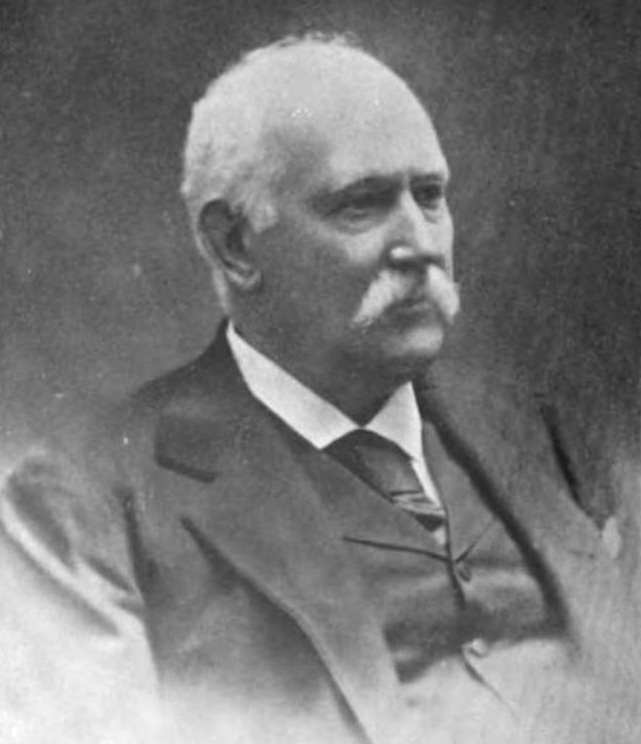
- Carroll in Governors of Maryland: From the Revolution to the Year 1908 by Heinrich Ewald Buchholz

37th Governor of Maryland
- In office January 12, 1876 – January 14, 1880
- Preceded by: James B. Groome
- Succeeded by: William T. Hamilton

President of the Maryland State Senate
- In office 1876–1874
- Preceded by: Henry Snyder
- Succeeded by: Daniel Fields

Member of the Maryland State Senate from Howard County
- In office 1868–1876
- Preceded by: Hart B. Holton
- Succeeded by: Arthur Pue Gorman

Personal details
- Born: September 30, 1830 Baltimore, Maryland, U.S.
- Died: February 27, 1911 (aged 80) Washington, D.C., U.S.
- Resting place: Bonnie Brae Cemetery, Baltimore, Maryland, U.S.
- Party: Democratic
- Spouse(s): Anita Phelps (m. 1856; died 1873); Mary Carter Thompson (m. 1877; died 1899)
- Children: 10

John Lee Carroll (September 30, 1830 – February 27, 1911) was an American politician who served as the 37th governor of Maryland from 1876 to 1880. He was a descendant of the Lee Family of Virginia.

He was a member of the Democratic Party.

== Early life and education ==
Carroll was born in Baltimore, Maryland, on September 30, 1830, the son of Col. Charles Carroll (b. 1801) and Mary Digges Lee (b. 1800). Col. Charles Carroll was the grandson of Charles Carroll of Carrollton, (1737–1832), the only Catholic signer and longest living, last surviving signer of the Declaration of Independence. John Lee Carroll was also a grandson of Congressman John Lee and great-grandson of Maryland's second (and seventh) Governor of Maryland, Thomas Sim Lee (1745–1819).

At the age of ten, in 1840, Carroll was sent to Mount Saint Mary's College in Emmitsburg, Maryland, where he remained for two years. He then attended Georgetown University in Georgetown, near Washington, D.C., and then the secular part of St. Mary's College, on North Paca Street in Baltimore, for another three years. Carroll then decided to enter the legal profession, and like his maternal grandfather, attended Harvard Law School at Harvard College, now Harvard University, in Cambridge, Massachusetts, for two terms.

== Career ==
After finishing schooling, Carroll worked as a student lawyer for the law office of Brown and Brune in Baltimore. He was admitted to the bar in 1851. Carroll practiced law in Maryland from 1854 until 1858. He ran as a Howard County Democratic candidate for the state General Assembly in 1854, (shortly after the separation of the former Howard or Western District of Anne Arundel County and the "erection"/establishment of Howard as the 22nd of the state's 23 counties). However, Lee lost to a candidate of the newly dominant "Know Nothing" Party (also known as the American Party) during the political crises of the 1850s. Carroll then moved to New York City, where he accepted a position as deputy clerk and United States Commissioner in the office of the clerk of the United States District Court. He stayed there until 1861, at the outbreak of the Civil War, when he returned to Maryland, where he then remained the rest of his life. Upon returning to Maryland, Carroll purchased "Doughoregan Manor", historic family estate in Howard County, near Ellicott City, Maryland from his older brother Charles Carroll.

Carroll was elected into the Maryland Senate in 1867 and served four terms, from 1868 to 1876. He was elected President of the State Senate in 1874.

In 1875, Carroll became the Democratic Party nominee for Governor of Maryland, opposed by James Morrison Harris. He won by a 10,000-vote majority and was inaugurated as governor on January 12, 1876.

=== Strikes and unrest in 1877 ===
The Great Railroad Strike of 1877 began with a sudden cut in wages by the B. & O. Railroad's Board of Directors and President John Work Garrett, which caused workers to walk off the job in Martinsburg, West Virginia, and spread nationwide to the rest of the B. & O., as well as several other lines. Governor Carroll called up the 5th and 6th Regiments of the Maryland National Guard to stop railroad workers from striking in Cumberland, Hagerstown and in Frederick County's shops and roundhouses at Brunswick. Once the news spread by telegraph east, it touched off riots in Baltimore at the Mount Clare Shops and the yards at the B. & O.'s Camden Street Station, headquarters of the line.

The National Guard attempted to march from their armories to Camden Station—the Fifth Regiment from the armory in the assembly hall above the Richmond Market along North Howard Street in the northwest city, and the Sixth from their armory at North Front and East Fayette Streets, near Jonestown/Old Town. The Fifth marched south down Howard Street and the Sixth attempted to march south on Front Street along the east bank of the Jones Falls for a few blocks then west on East Baltimore Street, through the middle of the downtown business district (and avoided the obvious associations of marching along the waterfront of Pratt Street, as the 6th Massachusetts Regiment did 16 years before, with its tragic memories). Despite this precaution, each regiment had to again literally fight its way through the streets of the city, attacked by projectiles, rocks and angry mobs the entire way. Conflict gripped the city and Governor Carroll was powerless to stem the tide. Later, additional reinforcements of Federal troops were called in by newly elected 19th President Rutherford B. Hayes to restore order in Baltimore.

=== Later career ===
In later years, Carroll served on the Howard County Board of Education and served in 1883 on an early grand jury that used both Caucasian and African American members.

Carroll was also a member of the District of Columbia Society of the Sons of the Revolution.

== Marriage and children ==
Carroll was married twice, first to Anita Phelps (April 23, 1838 – March 24, 1873), daughter of Royal Phelps of New York, on April 24, 1856. They had nine children:

- Charles Lee Carroll (October 5, 1857 – 1858)
- Mary Louisa Carroll (b. May 26, 1859); married Comte Jean de Kergorlay, of France
- Anita Maria Carroll (b. March 28, 1861); married Baron Louis de la Grange, of France
- Royal Phelps Carroll (October 29, 1863 – 1922), attended Harvard College (class of 1885); married to Marion Langdon (1864–1949), daughter of Eugene and Harriet (née Lowndes) Langdon of New York and a descendant of John Jacob Astor, 1 daughter
- Charles Carroll (January 12, 1865 – 1921); married Suzanne Bancroft (1865 – 1959), 1 son
- Albert Henry Carroll (October 6, 1866 – 1867)
- Mary Irene Carroll (March 3, 1869 – November 8, 1888)
- John Lee Carroll (February 26, 1871 – c. 1895)
- Mary Helen Carroll (b. 1873); married Herbert Robbins (1869 – 1946), no issue

Carroll was married secondly to Mary Carter Thompson (1847–1899), daughter of Judge Lucas P. Thompson, in April 1877 and had one son. As of 2012, Philip's grandchildren owned Doughoregan Manor, the family estate in Howard County.

- Philip Acosta Carroll (b. May 10, 1879 – July 1957); married to Nina Ryan (1897 – 1989), 2 sons and 1 daughter

Mary Thompson's sister Caroline Thompson was married to John Lee's older brother, Charles Carroll (1828–1895).

Carroll died in Washington, D.C. and was buried at the New Cathedral Cemetery in Baltimore City, Maryland.

== See also ==
- Carroll family

Party political offices
Preceded by William Pinkney Whyte	Democratic nominee for Governor of Maryland; 1875	Succeeded by William Thomas Hamilton
Political offices
Preceded by Henry Snyder	President of the Maryland State Senate; 1874	Succeeded by Daniel Fields
Preceded by James B. Groome	Governor of Maryland; 1876–1880	Succeeded by William T. Hamilton
