= Audrain Building =

Coordinates: 41.48200°N 71.30825°W

- U.S. Historic district – Contributing property
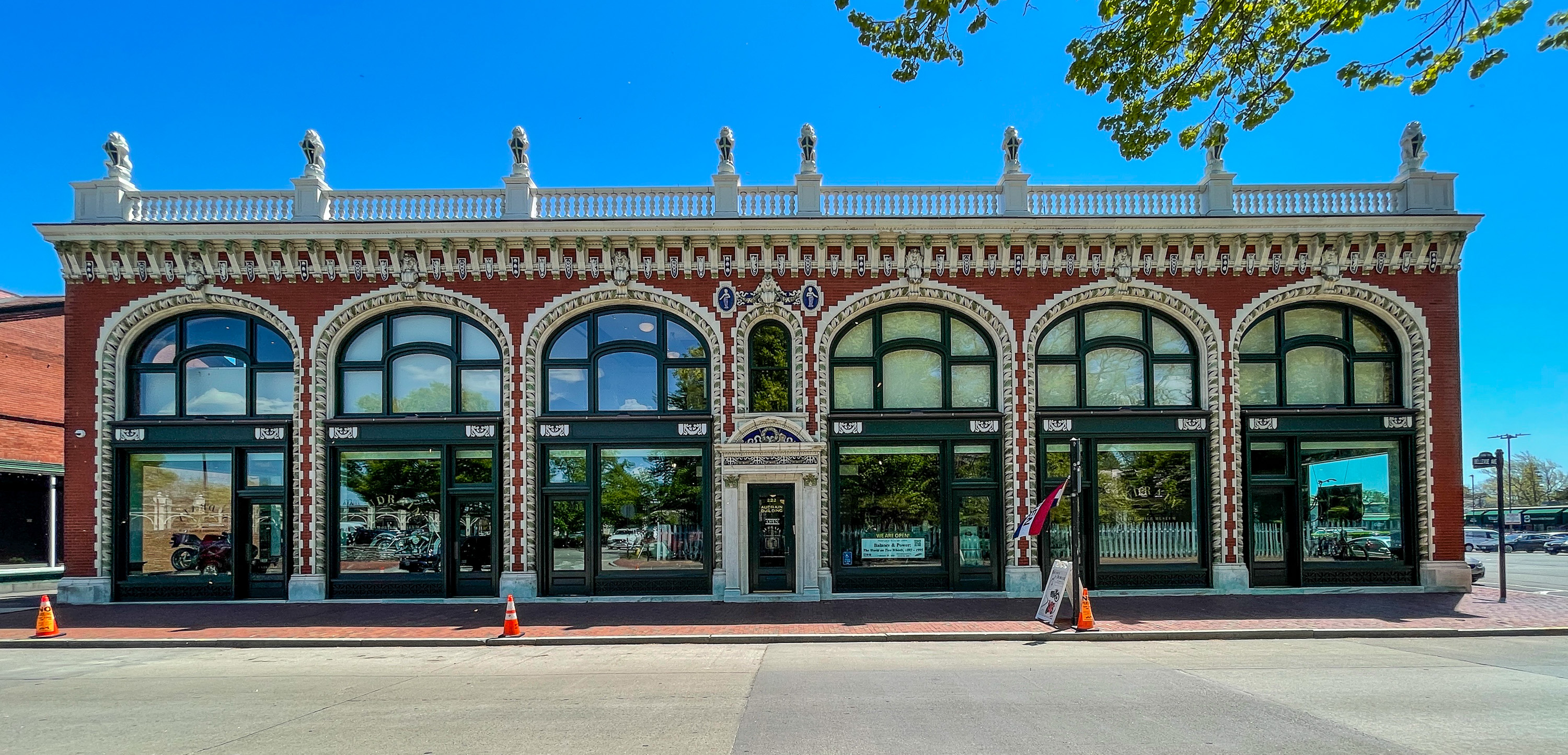
- Location: 222 Bellevue Avenue; Newport, Rhode Island
- Built: 1902–1903
- Architect: Bruce Price
- Part of: Bellevue Avenue/Casino Historic District (ID72000023)

The Audrain Building is an architecturally significant commercial building located at 222 Bellevue Avenue in Newport, Rhode Island. It is situated adjacent to the Newport Casino and is a contributing property to the Bellevue Avenue/Casino Historic District.

The building was constructed in 1902–1903 for Adolphe L. Audrain and was designed by noted New York architect Bruce Price. It is one of four buildings that form a distinguished central block within Newport, the others being the Travers Block by Richard Morris Hunt, the Newport Casino by McKim, Mead, and White, and the King Block by Perkins and Betton.

The building is two stories tall and forms six shop-front bays, with exterior dimensions of 110 by 73.5 feet. It is faced in red brick with brightly colored terra cotta trim in the style of the Italian Renaissance artist Luca della Robbia accentuating the bays and roofline. Street-level ornamentation is relatively restrained but increases at the arched second floor windows and cornice. The facade also features copies of della Robbia's swaddled infants from the Hospital of the Innocents in Florence. Recently renovated, the new owner has brought the building back to its original condition.

The Audrain Building is located in the Bellevue Avenue/Casino Historic District, which was added to the National Register of Historic Places in 1972.

== Automobile Museum ==
Since October 2014, the building has housed the Audrain Automobile Museum. In October 2019, the museum hosted the Audrain’s Newport Concours & Motor Week.

== Gallery ==
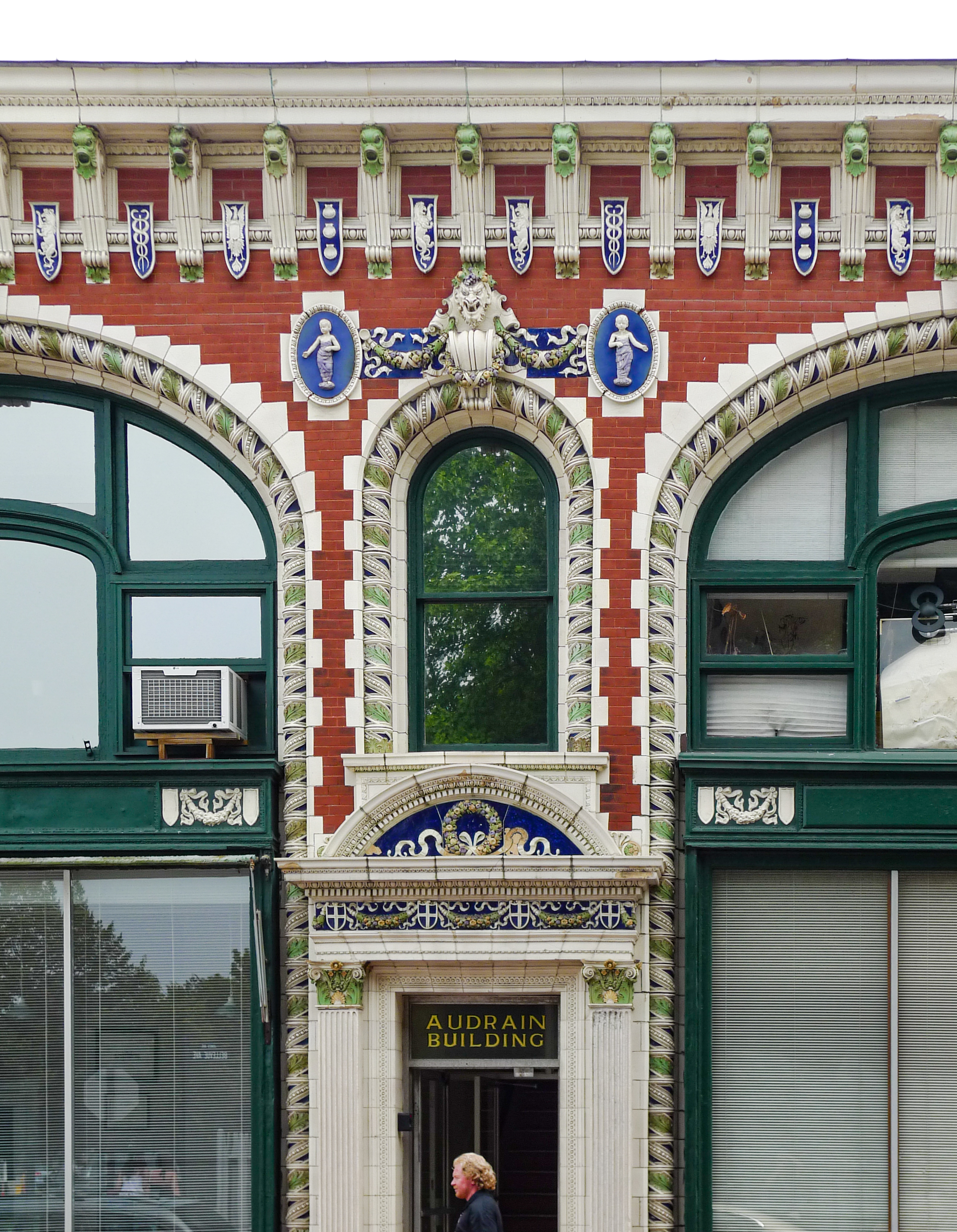
The building's facade featuring the replicas of della Robbia's Tondi

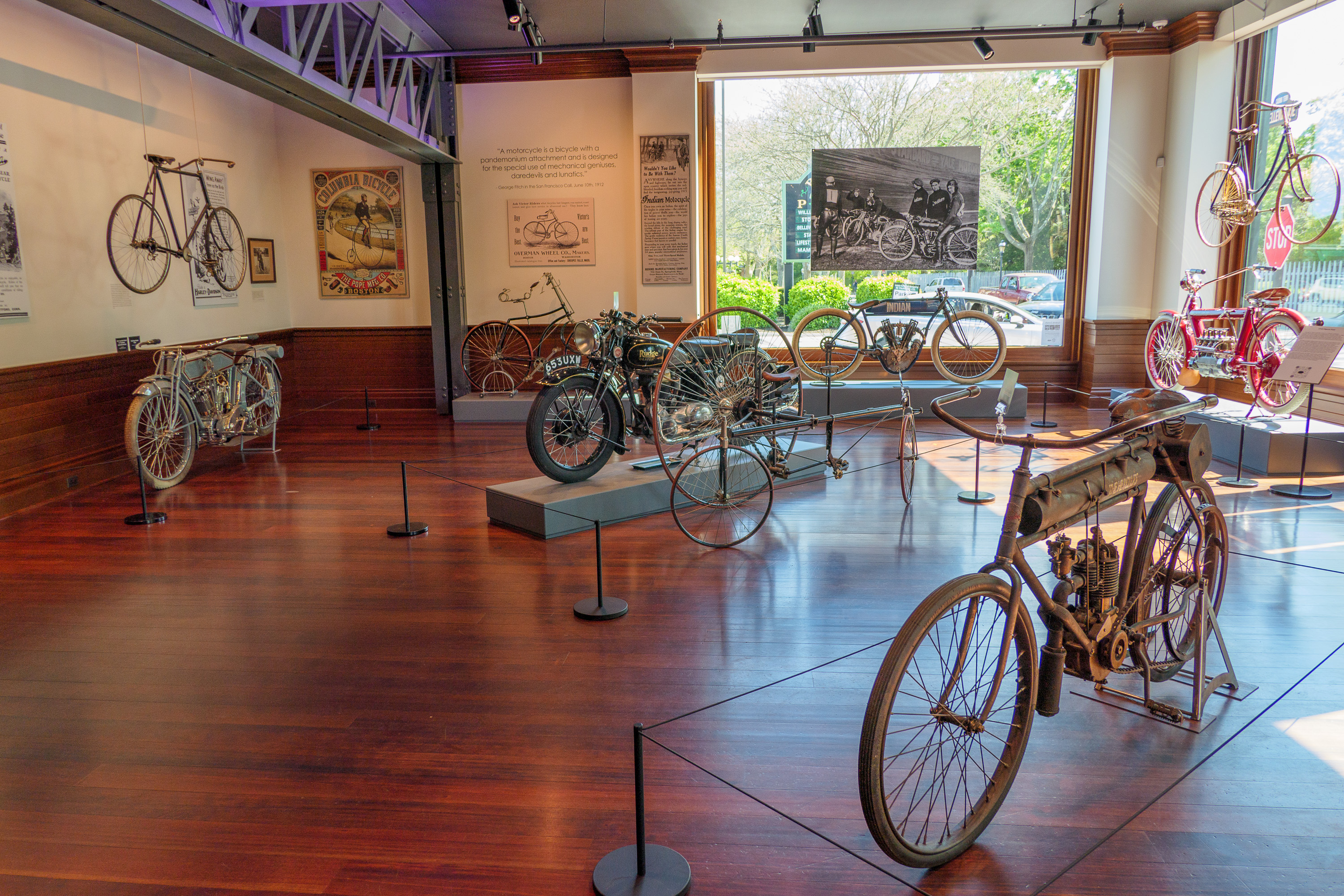
Exhibits in the Audrain Automobile Museum

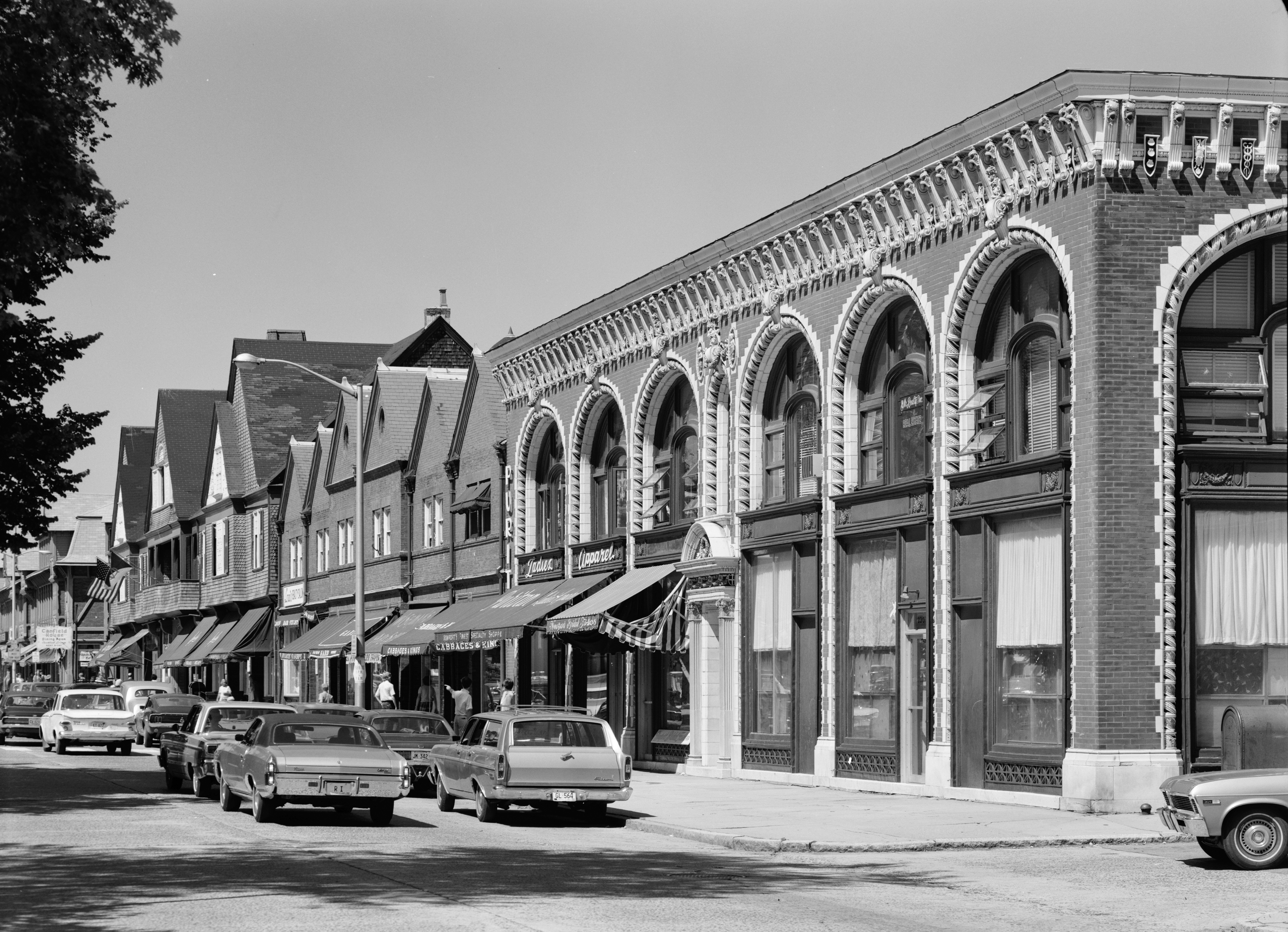
The structure in 1970 as documented in the Historic American Buildings Survey

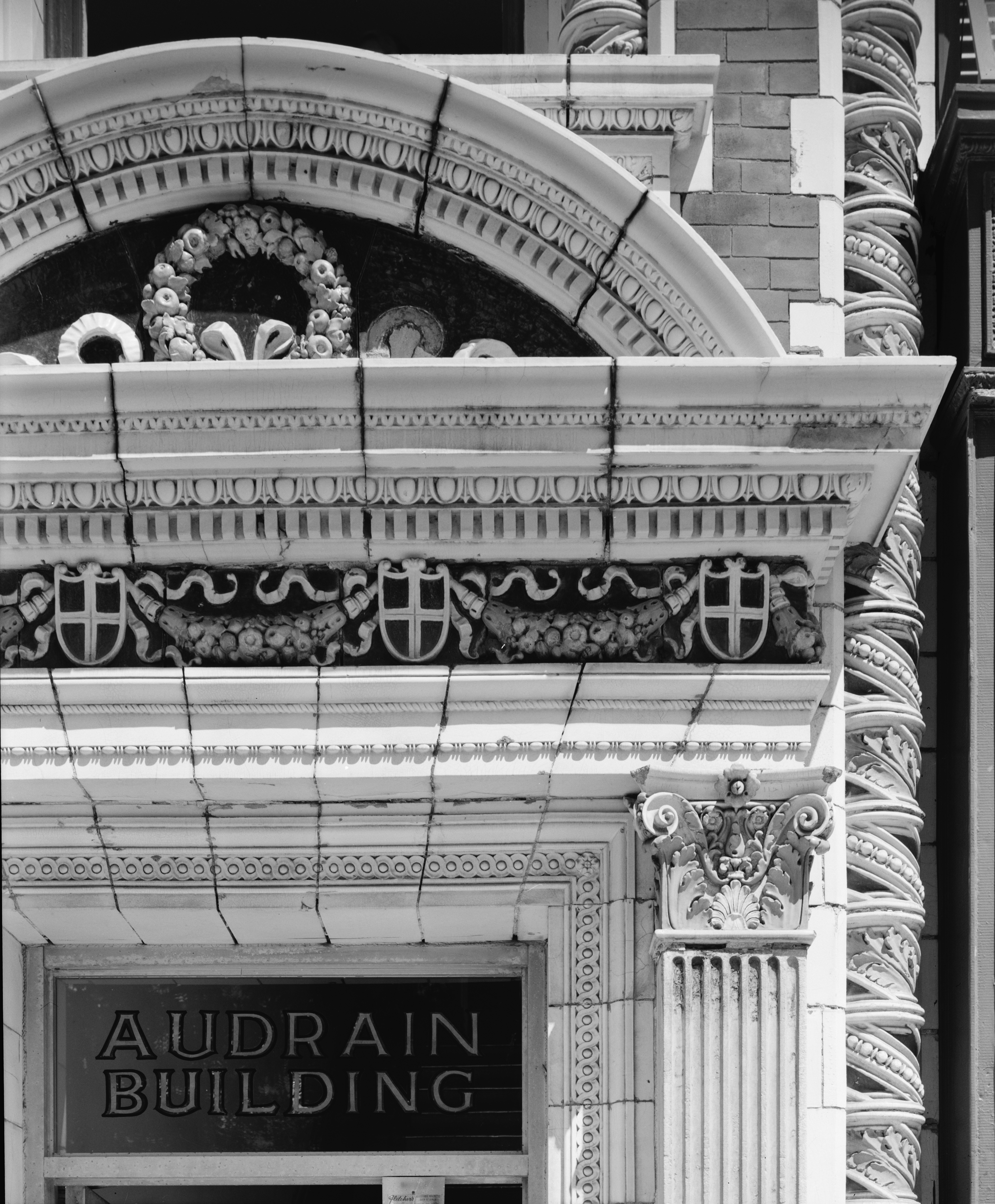
A detail of the ornate terra cotta decoration adorning the building's entrance

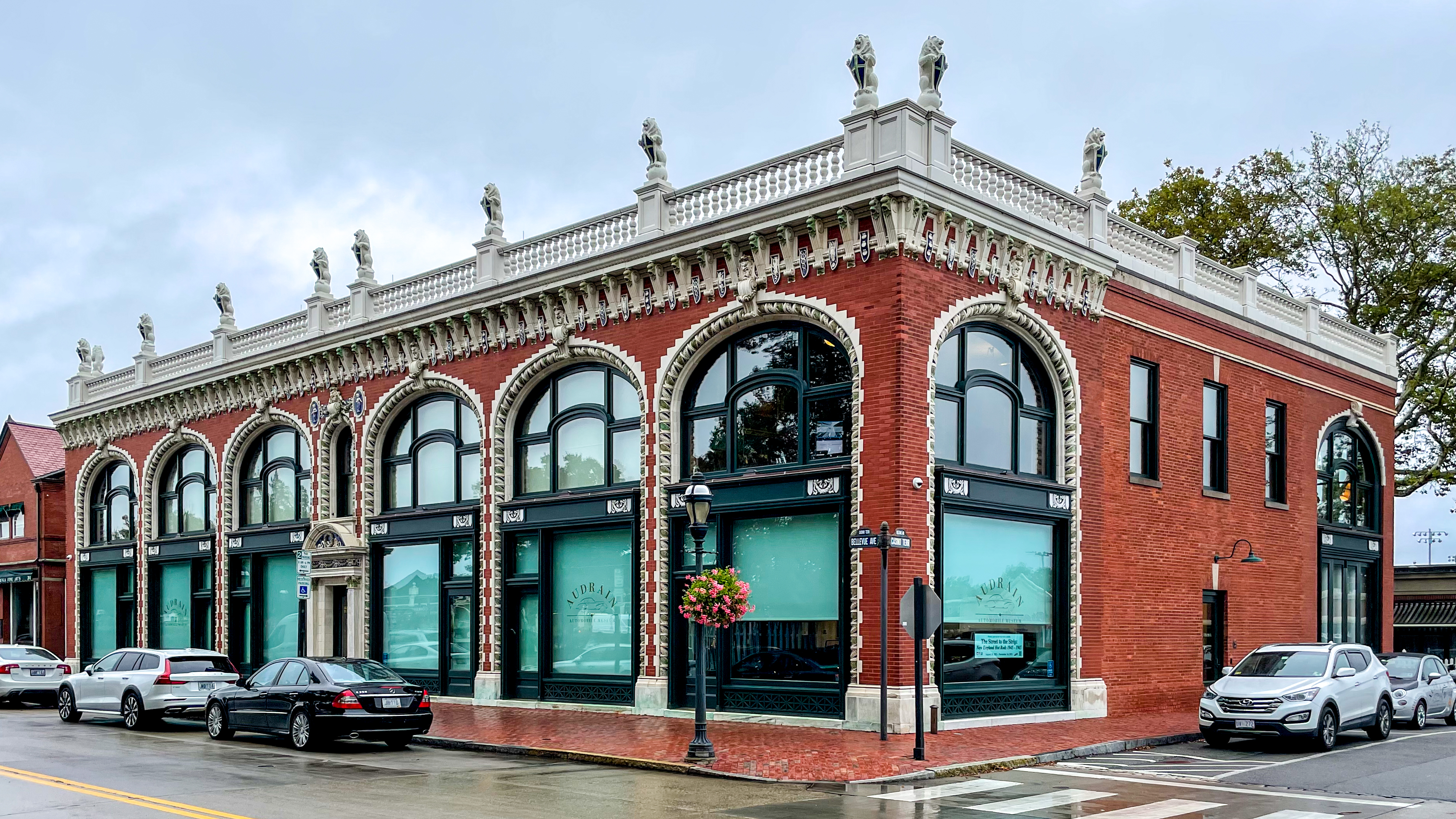
The building from Bellevue Avenue
