= Charles Carroll (philanthropist) =

American socialite (1865–1921)

- Born: January 12, 1865; Baltimore, Maryland, U.S.
- Died: October 6, 1921 (aged 56); Menton, France
- Education: Georgetown College
- Spouse: Suzanne Bancroft (after 1887)
- Children: Charles Bancroft Carroll
- Parent(s): John Lee Carroll; Anita Phelps
- Family: See Carroll family

Charles Carroll (Note: Charles Henry Browning in Americans of Royal Descent: A Collection of Genealogies of American Families Whose Lineage is Traced to the Legitimate Issue of Kings refers to Charles as "Theodore Charles Carroll".) (January 12, 1865 – October 6, 1921) was an American heir and descendant of the Lee Family of Virginia who was prominent in New York Society during the Gilded Age. After the death of his father in 1911, Carroll was the unofficial head of Carroll family of Maryland.

== Early life ==
Carroll was born on January 12, 1865, in Baltimore, Maryland. He was the son of Governor of Maryland John Lee Carroll and Anita Phelps Carroll. His brother Royal Phelps Carroll, was married to Marion Langdon, a descendant of John Jacob Astor and the stepdaughter of Philip Schuyler.

His maternal grandfather was Royal Phelps. His paternal grandfather was Charles Carroll of Doughoregan Manor was himself the grandson of Charles Carroll of Carrollton, the last surviving signor of the Declaration of Independence. They were descended from the prominent Carroll family.

He was educated at Georgetown College, which his family helped to found.

== Society life ==
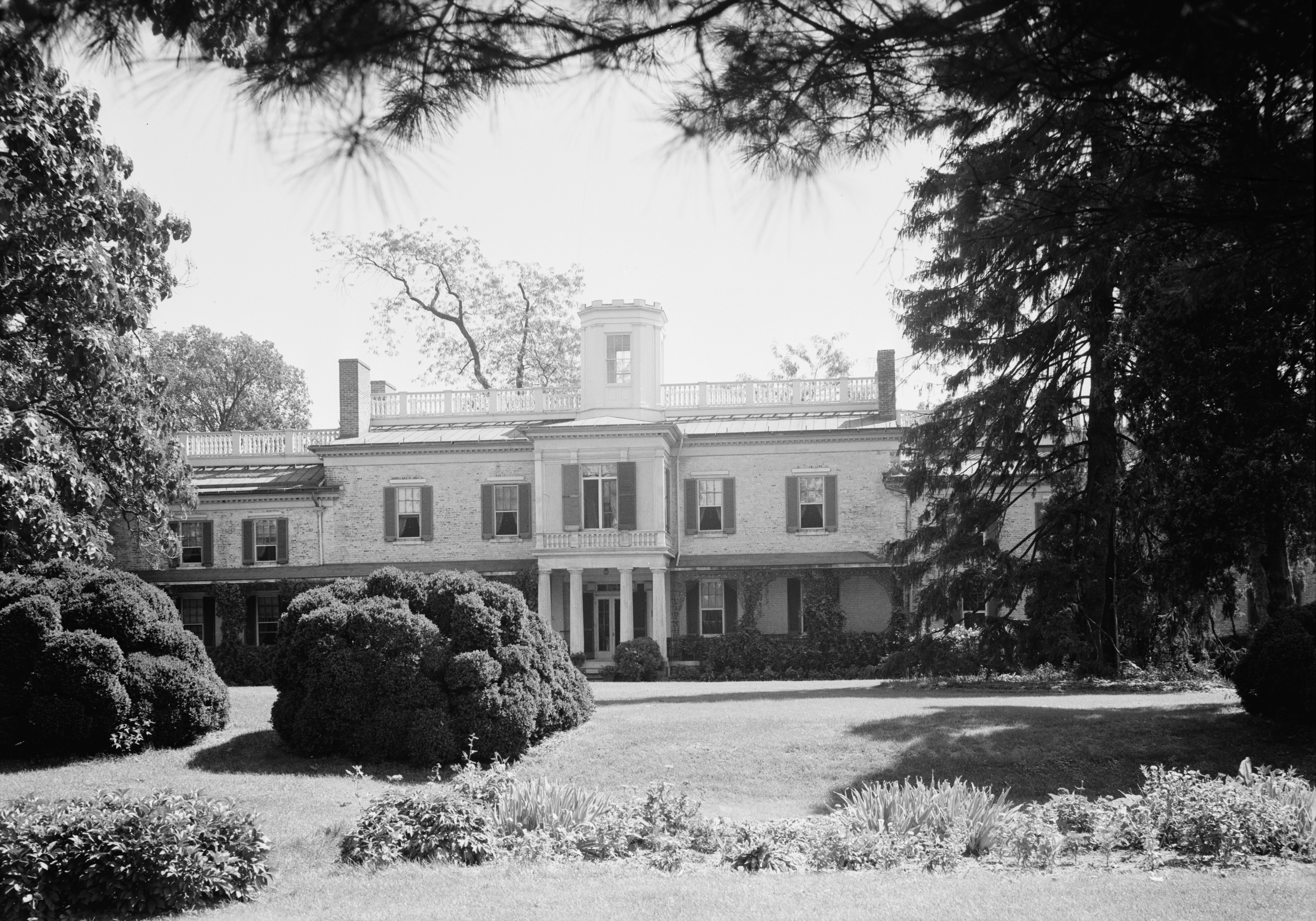
1936 photograph of Carroll's Doughoregan Manor in Ellicott City, Maryland

Despite spending most of his life in Paris, Carroll and his wife were considered prominent in New York and Newport society. In 1892, they were included in Ward McAllister's "Four Hundred", purported to be an index of New York's best families, published in The New York Times. Conveniently, 400 was the number of people that could fit into Mrs. Astor's ballroom.

Following his father's death in 1911, Carroll bought out his other family members interest in the Carroll family estate, Doughoregan Manor in Ellicott City, Maryland, in 1912.

=== World War I ===
During World War I, Carroll, who was living in France, joined the Red Cross at the front, spending time with the French and Italian troops. He was awarded the Italian Medal militaire for his bravery and efforts to help the injured during the War.

After the War, he became president of the American society for Fatherless Children of France and donated his time and funds to various charitable causes and efforts. For his efforts, Peter I the King of Serbia decorated him, Victor Emmanuel III the King of Italy awarded him silver medal for valor, and the French government made him a Chevalier of the Legion of Honor.

== Personal life ==
On November 15, 1887, Carroll was married to Suzanne Bancroft, the daughter of George Dwight Bancroft and Louise Tailandier who resided in France. Suzanne, who was described by The New York Times as being "certainly not more than 30, with a bright but not handsome countenance", was the granddaughter of George Bancroft, who served as the U.S. Minister to the United Kingdom and the Kingdom of Prussia, as well as the U.S. Secretary of the Navy where he established the United States Naval Academy. The unannounced wedding was a surprise to society and was held Washington. Before their marriage, she was rumored to be engaged to Vicomte Albert de Channac Lauzac. Together Charles and Suzanne were the parents of:

- Charles Bancroft Carroll, a graduate of the Naval Academy who was an officer in the United States Navy. He married Anita Hack (1891–1972), the daughter of Frederick Home Hack, in April 1914. They divorced in 1923.

In 1921, Suzanne inherited part of the Bancroft estate left by her brother, George Bancroft, upon his death.

Carroll died suddenly in the garden at Villa Himalaya, his home in Menton near Nice, France, on October 6, 1921. He was honored by the French government during his funeral. In 1923 his widow donated a Tapestry Canopy and Louis XV chair to Maryland Institute in his honor.

=== Descendants ===
Through his son Charles, he was the grandfather of Charles Carroll (1915–1987) and Anita Marie Louise Carroll (1916–2009).
