= Newport Casino =

Sports center in Newport, Rhode Island

- U.S. National Register of Historic Places
- U.S. National Historic Landmark
- U.S. National Historic Landmark District – Contributing property
- U.S. Historic district – Contributing property
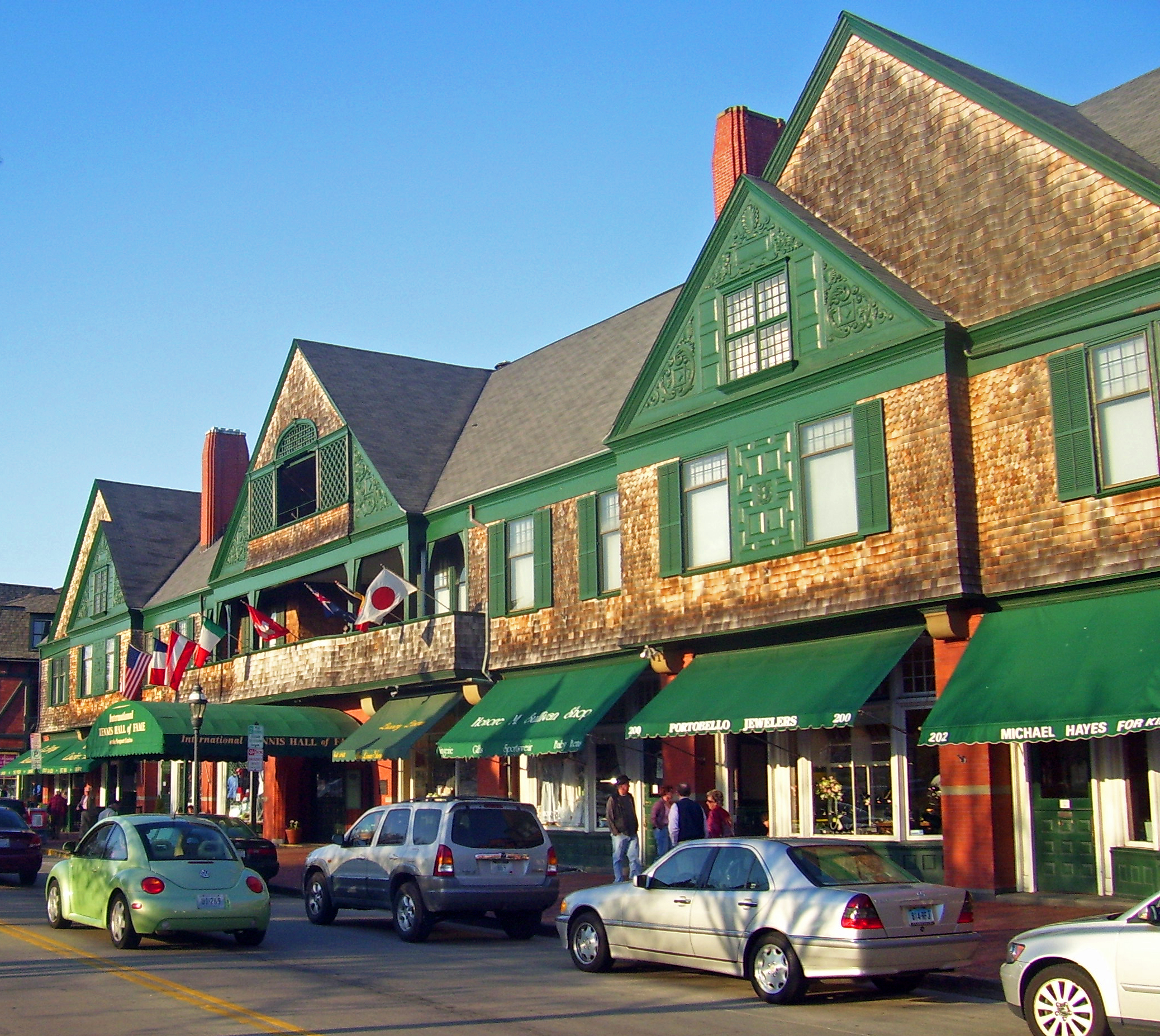
- Newport Casino in 2008

- Location within Rhode Island Location within the United States
- Location: Newport, Rhode Island, U.S.
- Coordinates: 41°28′56″N 71°18′27″W
- Area: less than one acre
- Built: 1879
- Architect: McKim, Mead & White
- Architectural style: Shingle Style
- Part of: Bellevue Avenue Historic District; Bellevue Avenue/Casino Historic District (ID72000023; 72000024)
- NRHP reference No.: 70000083

Significant dates
- Added to NRHP: December 2, 1970
- Designated NHL: February 27, 1987
- Designated NHLDCP: December 8, 1972
- Designated CP: December 8, 1972

The Newport Casino is an athletic complex and recreation center located at 180–200 Bellevue Avenue, Newport, Rhode Island in the Bellevue Avenue/Casino Historic District. Built in 1879–1881 by New York Herald publisher James Gordon Bennett, Jr., it was designed in the Shingle style by the newly formed firm of McKim, Mead & White. The Newport Casino was the firm's first major commission and helped to establish the firm's national reputation. Built as a social club, it included courts for both lawn tennis and court tennis, facilities for other games, such as squash and lawn bowling, club rooms for reading, socializing, card-playing, and billiards, shops, and a convertible theater and ballroom. It became a center of Newport's social life during the Gilded Age through the 1920s.

The casino was added to the National Register of Historic Places in 1970, and was designated a National Historic Landmark in 1987. The complex, which was the site of the earliest American lawn tennis championships, has been the site of the International Tennis Hall of Fame since 1954.

== 1879 – 1900 ==
James Gordon Bennett, Jr. was a summer resident of Newport and in August 1879 paid $60,000 to acquire the Sidney Brooks estate "Stone Villa" (demolished in 1957, the Bellevue Gardens shopping complex currently stands in its place). Legend claims that Bennett placed a bet with his guest and polo partner British Cavalry Officer, Captain Henry Augustus "Sugar" Candy that Candy would not ride his horse up onto the front porch of Newport's most exclusive men's club – The Newport Reading Room. Candy won the bet, but the Reading Room members were not amused and revoked guest privileges for the men causing Bennett to build his own social club.

The Newport Mercury does not confirm the polo-pony exploits by Bennett and Captain Candy, but rather states Candy was dismissed from the Newport Reading Room "for a clear violation of the rules of that institution." Nonetheless, Bennett had already been in discussions with Charles McKim in 1879 about converting his summer home Stone Villa into a social club. However, he then decided to acquire the vacant lot across the street and commission McKim and his partners, William Mead and Stanford White to bring to life a facility that would allow for both private and public areas. The blueprints for the Newport Casino were drawn up by the end of 1879. The construction was overseen by local contractor Nathan Barker. Ground was broken for the construction on January 8, 1880. With an estimated construction crew of 200-300 laborers, the Newport Casino opened to its first patrons in July 1880, and the general public got their first view in August 1880.

Charles McKim oversaw the main design of the physical building. William Mead's role was as engineer and financial organizer. Stanford White was responsible for the design of the interior spaces, including furniture, as well as the Casino Theatre. The completed main building consisted of a three-story clubhouse; the ground floor had open-air porches and Bellevue Avenue facing storefronts, the second floor housed the billiards room, club and reading rooms, and lodgings, while the third floor contained additional lodging rooms and attic spaces. At the rear of the property is a two-story porch that connects the Court Tennis building and the Casino Theatre building. Taking many elements and cues from the Japanese Pavilion at the 1876 Centennial International Exhibition in Philadelphia, McKim, Mead & White provided for a plan that was both secluded and open.

A theatre located at the rear of the property (extant) was completed in 1881. Originally, its 500 seats were removable for dancing and the building was the scene of many social occasions for fashionable Summer visitors in the Gilded Age. One such attendee and early performer who lectured at the theatre in 1882 was Oscar Wilde.

The United States Lawn Tennis Association held their first championships at the Casino in 1881, an event that would continue through 1914. By this time, tennis was firmly entrenched as the key attraction at the Casino.

== 1900 – 1954 ==
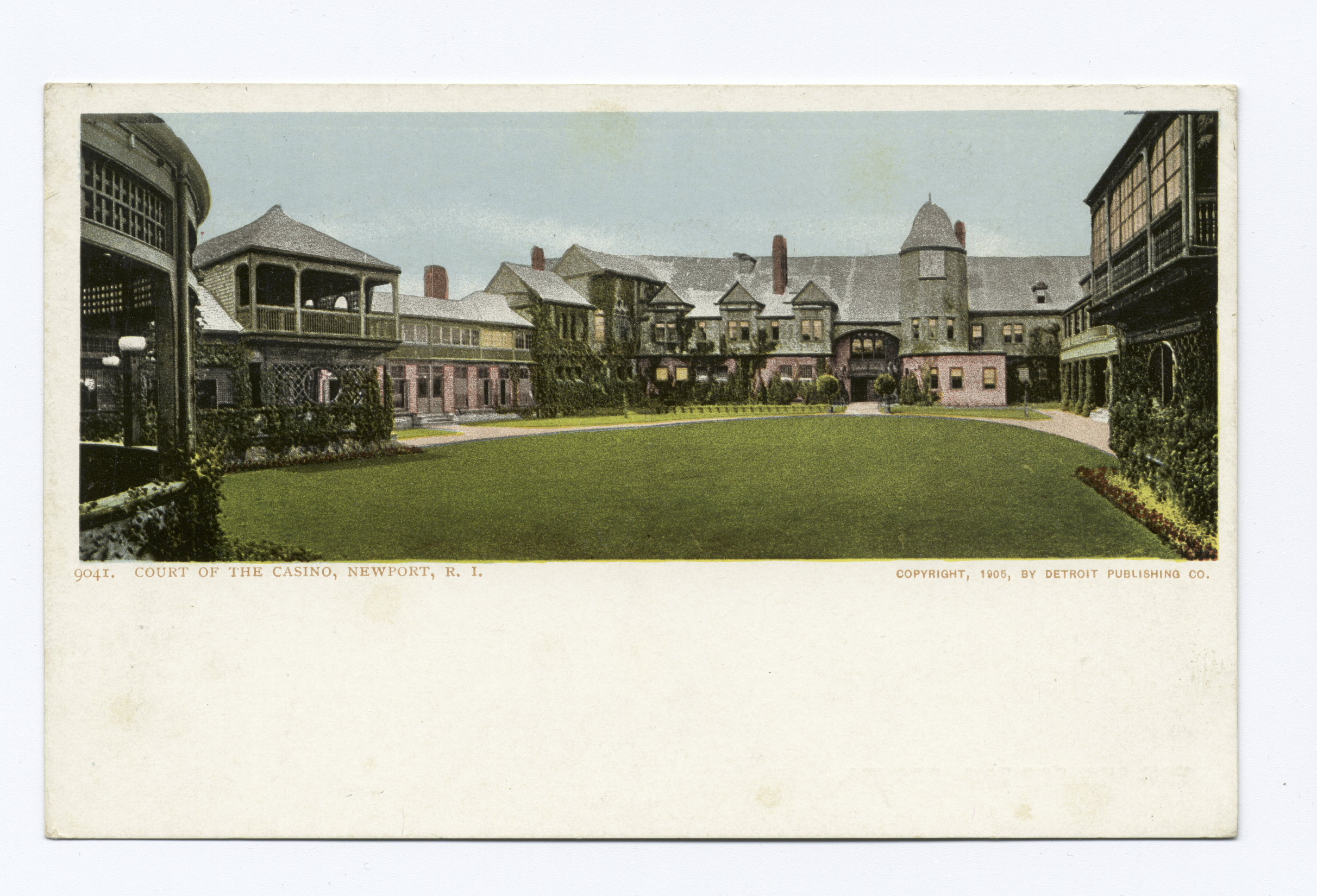
Postcard, early 20th century

The first half of the 20th century was unkind to the Newport Casino. The Gilded age drew to a close with the onset of the Depression, and the Newport fell by the wayside as a summer resort for the wealthy and powerful. The Casino struggled financially as a social club right from the start, and by the 1950s the Casino was in sad shape. Like many of the mansions, there was the very real possibility that it would be demolished to make way for more modern retail space.

Candy and Jimmy Van Alen took over operating the club, and by 1954 had established the International Tennis Hall of Fame in the Newport Casino. The combination of prominent headliners at the tennis matches and the museum allowed the building to be saved.

It stands today as one of the finest examples of Victorian Shingle Style architecture in the world. The buildings are generally well preserved, and the Casino Theatre which was in a state of disrepair was restored in 2010 and is currently leased to Salve Regina University. The theater occasionally still shows films, mostly during the Newport International Film Festival or charity events.

The Newport Casino hosted the first Newport Jazz Festival on July 17 and 18, 1954.

== 1955 – Present ==
In 1963, the Casino was the site of Bob Dylan's first appearance at the Newport Folk Festival, where he performed with Joan Baez in the Horseshoe Court. Pete Seeger, Phil Ochs, and Tom Paxton also performed.

The complex of buildings has undergone frequent restoration during the modern era.

At the rear of the property is a two-story porch that connects the Court Tennis Building and the Casino Theatre, both original to the Newport Casino complex built in 1880. The Court Tennis building was restored in 1980 and the National Tennis Club was formed to use and preserve this game, from which the modern game of tennis evolved. The Casino Theatre, which had long been used primarily for storage, was restored in partnership with nearby Salve Regina University in 2010 to house their theater program during the school year and to be used for a variety of films, lectures, and other programming during the summer months. One important change in the Theater renovation is that the fixed one-level seating which had been installed in the early 1920s (to replace the removable seating of the original design) was replaced with graded permanent seating. During the renovation the fixed seating was removed and restored by the same Michigan company that originally made the seats in the 1920s, and even retained the top-hat storage underneath each chair. In 2010 the International Tennis Hall of Fame and Salve Regina University's restoration project of the Casino Theatre was recognized by Preserve Rhode Island and the Rhode Island Historical Preservation & Heritage Commission with the Rhody Award for Historic Preservation.

The Hall of Fame Museum's exhibition galleries which exist on the second floor of the main Newport Casino building have been created in a series of renovations, first in the 1970s, then in the 1990s, again in 2014–2015, and most recently in 2025. In the 1990s, the third floor of the main building was renovated into a suitable repository for the storage and study of pieces in the Tennis Hall of Fame artifact, library, and archival collections. The most recent renovation exposed many original McKim, Mead & White fireplaces that had long been hidden behind sheet-rock walls.

Recently several large construction projects have helped reshape the campus. In 2014, a steel indoor tennis building and gas station were demolished and a 19th-century cottage was relocated to create space for a large new structure designed in the Shingle Style by Robert A.M. Stern to house three new indoor courts, a gymnasium, an enlarged pro shop and Hall of Fame office. Three new outdoor courts are enclosed by an inflatable bubble roof during the winter months to double the number of year-round courts available on the campus. The stadium court and stands also underwent renovation on 2016 to replace old bleacher seating located on the South end of the courts with new individual seating modeled on the seating at Wimbledon. This renovation also modified the West Stands, which had originally been built as part of the coaching and riding ring of the original complex, which was converted into the showcase Stadium Court in the 1970s.

== Buildings ==
The complex includes:

- The Casino (shops, a restaurant, offices, and the International Tennis Hall of Fame Museum)
- Horseshoe Piazza and Court
- Bill Talbert Stadium
- Court Tennis Building (The National Court Tennis Club)
- Casino Theatre – restored and managed by Salve Regina University Department of Performing Arts
- Indoor tennis courts (Newport Casino Indoor Racquet Club)
- Various grass tennis courts (Newport Casino Lawn Tennis Club)

== Sports ==
The Newport Casino was never a public gambling establishment. Originally, "casino" meant a small villa built for pleasure. During the 19th century, the term casino came to include other buildings where social activities took place.

In its heyday during the Gilded Age, the Newport Casino offered a wide array of social diversions to the summer colony including archery, billiards, bowling, concerts, dancing, dining, horse shows, lawn bowling, reading, lawn tennis, tea parties, and theatricals. It was best known as the home of American lawn tennis; the Casino hosted the 1881–1914 National Championships, later called the U.S. Open. Between 1915 and 1967 it hosted the Newport Casino Invitational men's tennis tournament.

Today, there is still an active grass-court tennis club, as well as an indoor tennis club. The Newport Casino Croquet Club offers championship croquet play on Newport's grass courts.

The Court Tennis Building, housing the National Tennis Club, is part of the original complex, and was constructed in 1881. The structure lost its roof to a fire during the 1940s but was restored to functionality with a large-scale renovation in 1980, and remains one of the most active courts of its type in the United States.

== Notable Members ==
Notable former members include:

- John Jacob Astor IV, American businessman
- Charles H. Baldwin, an officer in the United States Navy, who served during the Mexican–American War and the American Civil War
- August Belmont, United States banker, financier and diplomat
- James Gordon Bennett Jr., American publisher
- Edward H. Bulkeley, American clubman
- Thomas Forbes Cushing, American clubman
- Elisha Dyer Jr., American Politician
- John N. A. Griswold, American China trade merchant, industrialist, and diplomat
- Gardiner Greene Howland, American businessman
- H. H. Hunnewell, American banker
- David H. King Jr., American gilded age constructor
- Henry Ledyard, American politician
- Pierre Lorillard IV, American tobacco manufacturer and racehorse owner
- Levi P. Morton, Vice President of the United States from 1889 to 1893
- Royal Phelps, American politician
- Fairman Rogers, American academic
- Philip Schuyler, Soldier, clubman, philanthropist and prominent member of New York society during the Gilded Age
- Frederic W. Stevens, American lawyer and banker
- William R. Travers, American businessman

== Gallery ==
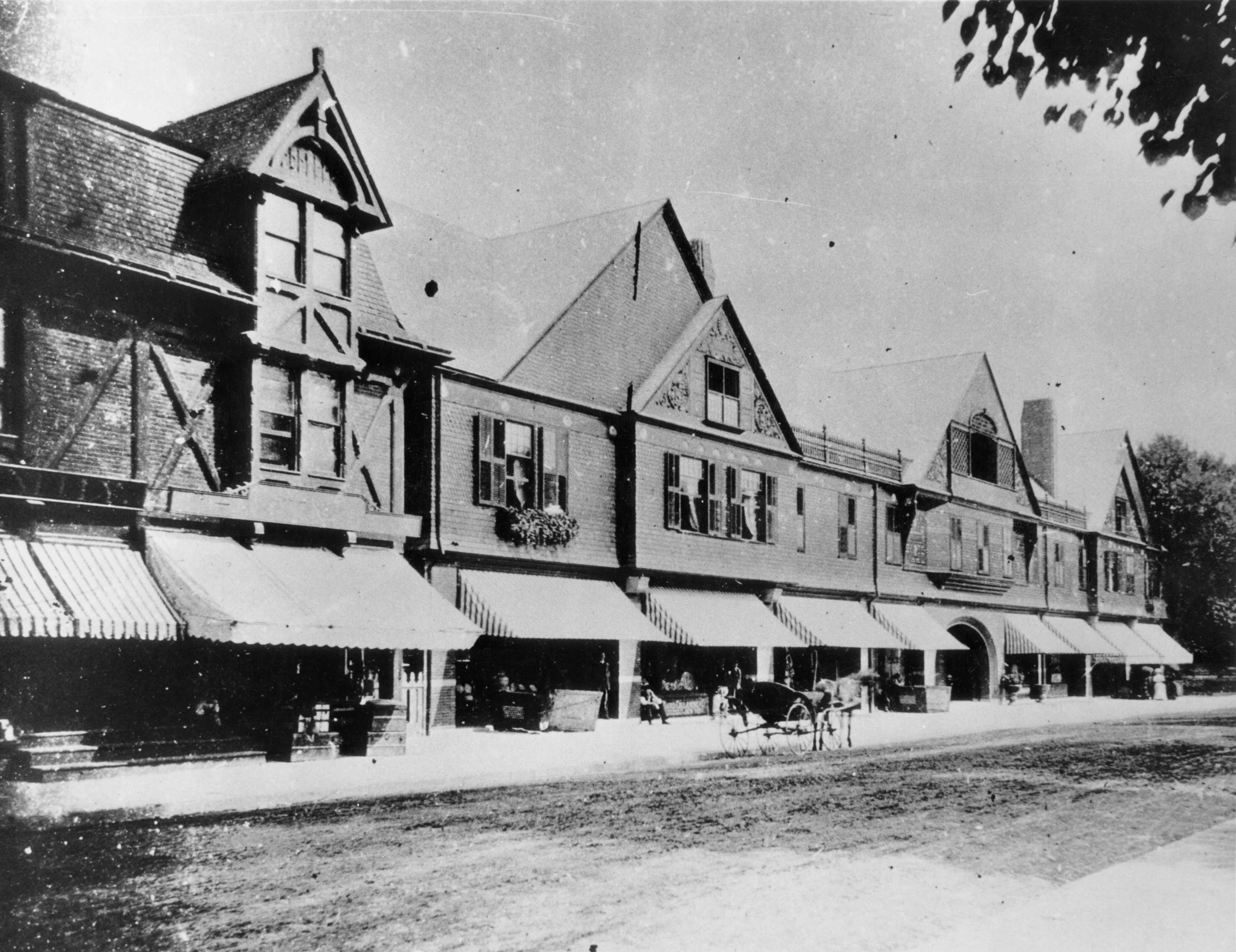
Newport Casino original façade, 1880

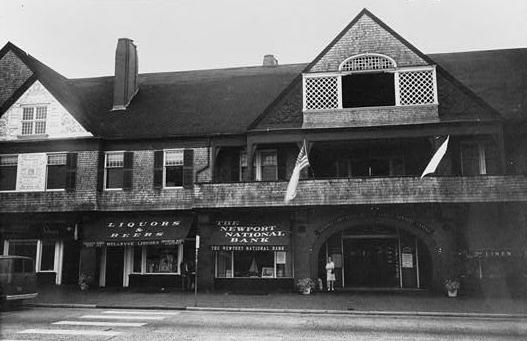
Newport Casino, Bellevue Ave. façade, 1970

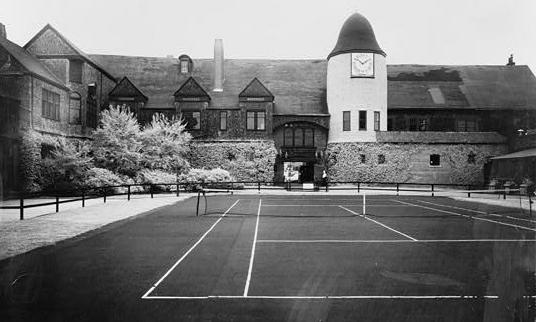
Newport Casino, Horseshoe Court, 1970

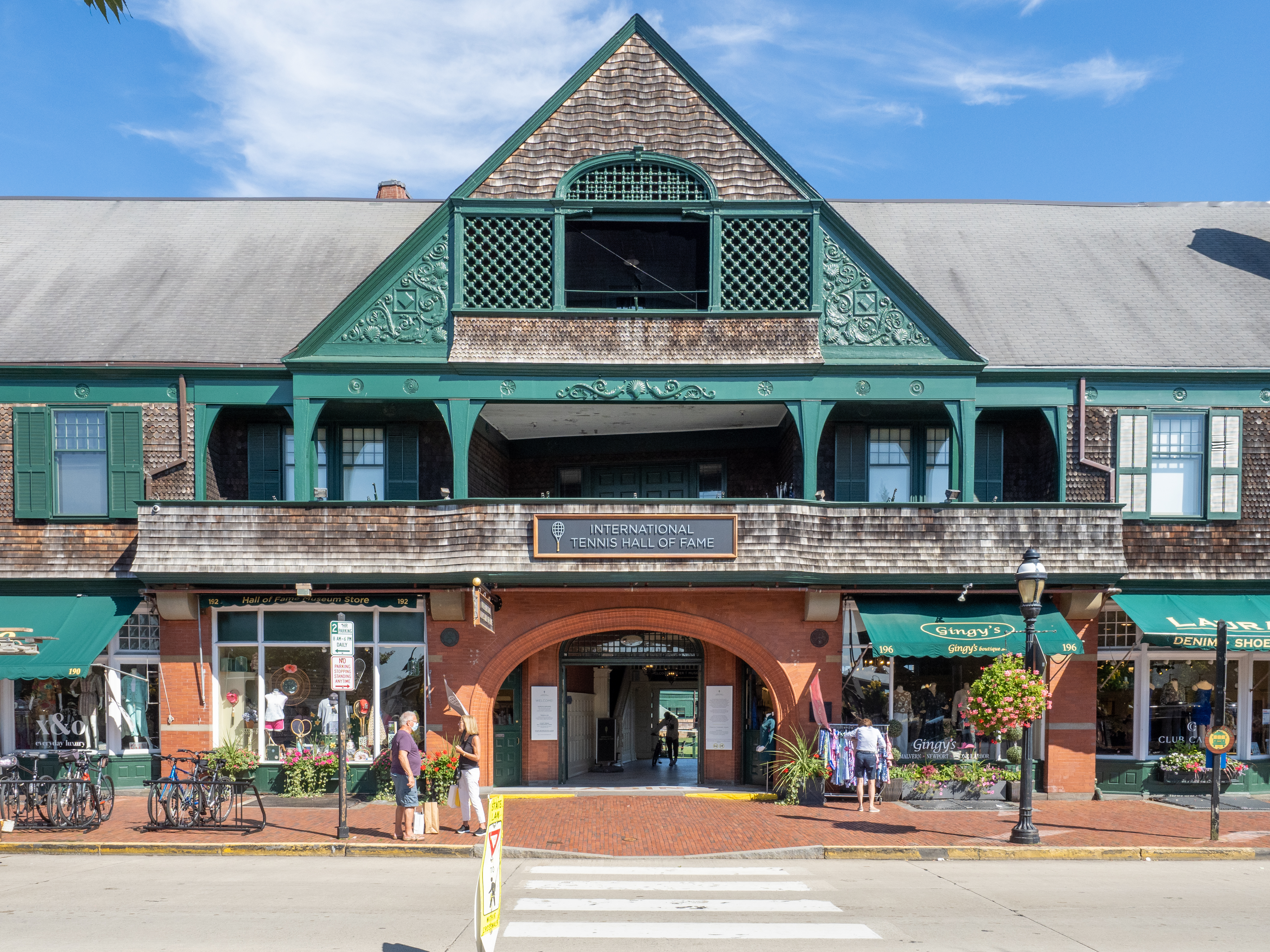
Bellevue Avenue façade

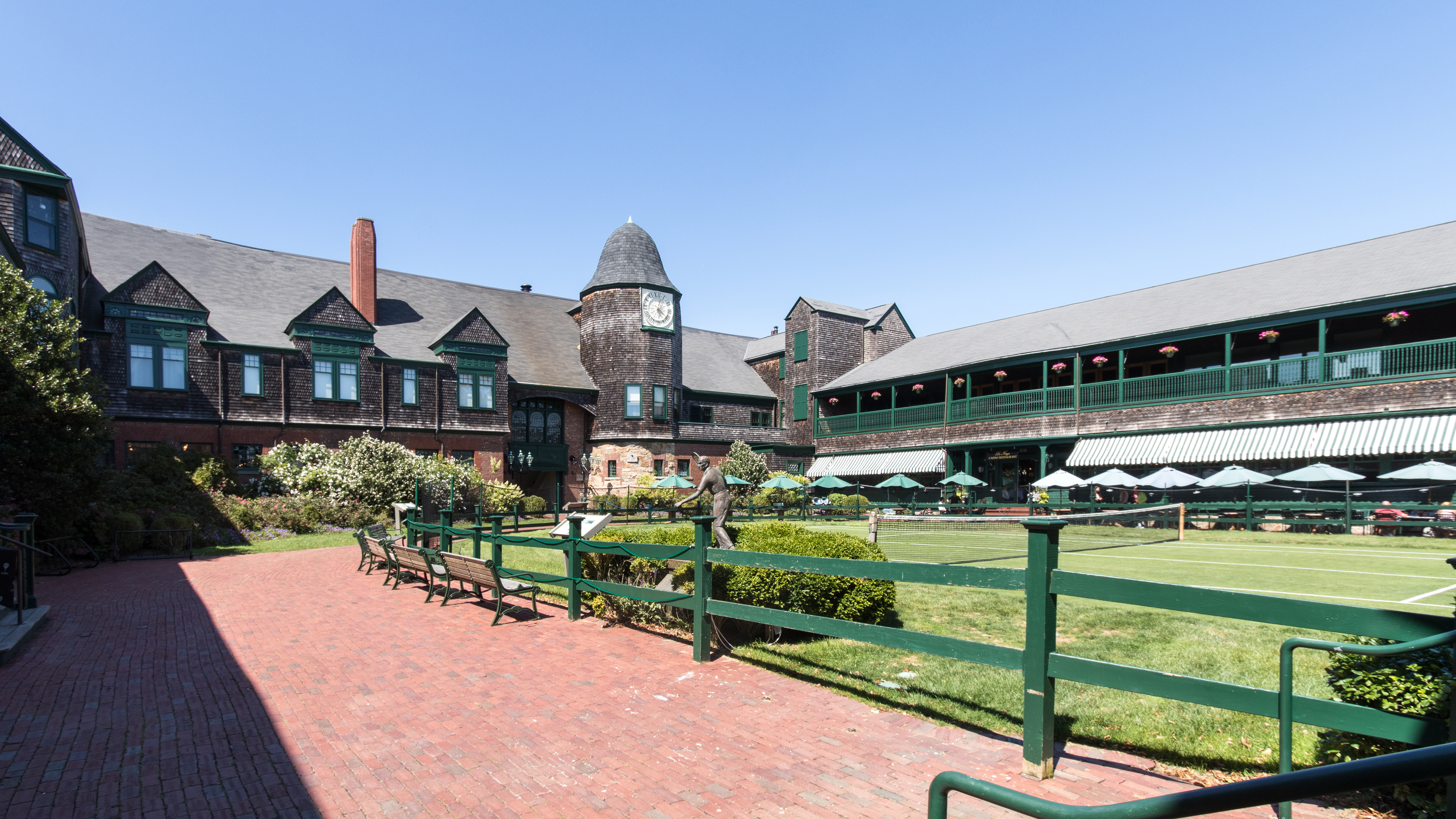
Horseshoe Courtyard

== See also ==
- List of tennis stadiums by capacity
- List of National Historic Landmarks in Rhode Island
- National Register of Historic Places listings in Newport County, Rhode Island

Preceded by first venue	Home of the U.S. Championships; 1881–1914	Succeeded by West Side Tennis Club; 1915–1920
