= 1875 Maryland gubernatorial election =

- November 2, 1875
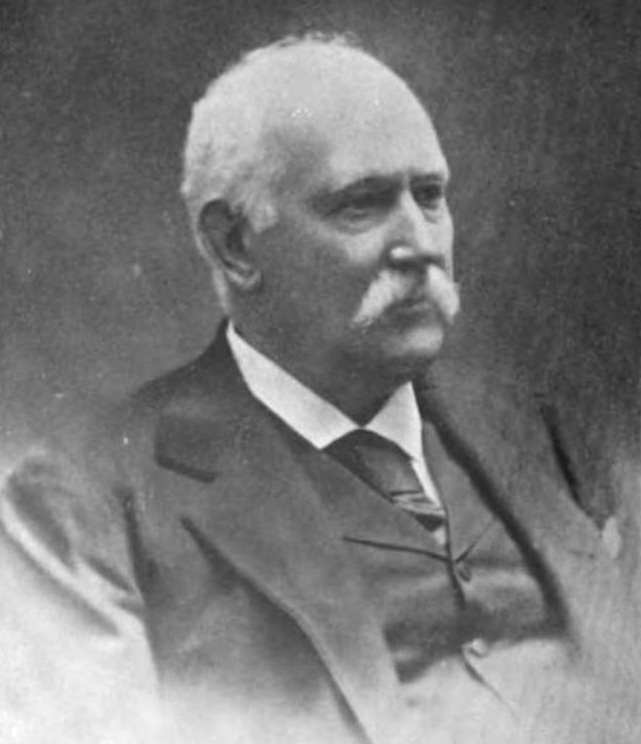

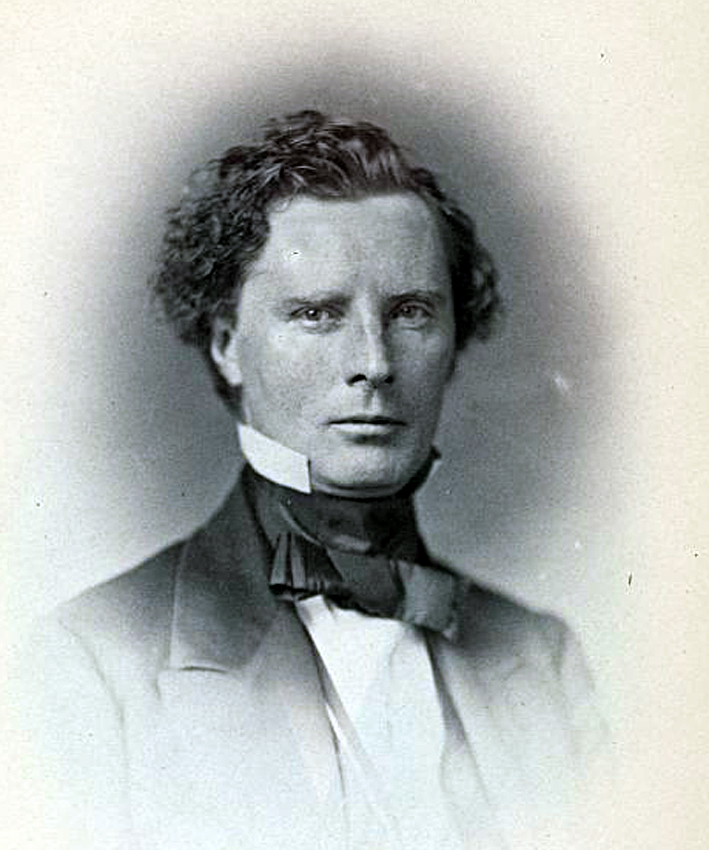
Nominee	John Lee Carroll	James Morrison Harris
Party	Democratic	Republican
Popular vote	85,454	72,530
Percentage	54.09%	45.91%
- County results Carroll: 50–60% 60–70% Harris: 50–60%
Governor before election
James Black Groome
Democratic
Elected Governor
John Lee Carroll
Democratic

The 1875 Maryland gubernatorial election took place on November 2, 1875.

Incumbent Democratic Governor James Black Groome did not seek re-election, having withdrawn his name from consideration prior to the Democratic state convention.

Democratic candidate John Lee Carroll defeated Republican candidate James Morrison Harris.

== General election ==
=== Candidates ===
- John Lee Carroll, Democratic, State Senator
- James Morrison Harris, Republican, former U.S. Congressman

=== Results ===
1879 Maryland gubernatorial election (Note: Some sources give the result as Carroll 85,447, Harris 72,544.)
Party	Candidate	Votes	%	±%
Democratic	John Lee Carroll	85,454	54.09%	
Republican	James Morrison Harris	72,530	45.91%	
Majority		12,924	8.18%	
Turnout		157,984		
Democratic hold		Swing		
