= J. Morrison Harris =

American politician (1817–1898)

James Morrison Harris
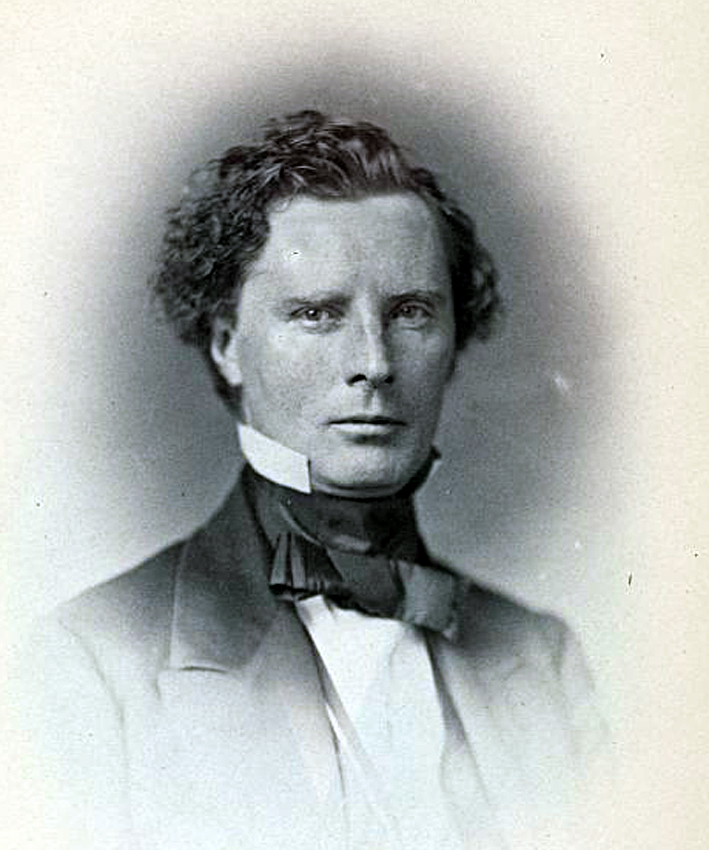

Member of the U.S. House of Representatives from Maryland's 3rd district
- In office March 4, 1855 – March 3, 1861
- Preceded by: Joshua Van Sant
- Succeeded by: Cornelius Leary

Personal details
- Born: November 20, 1817 Baltimore, Maryland, U.S.
- Died: July 16, 1898 (aged 80) Baltimore, Maryland, U.S.
- Resting place: Westminster Hall and Burying Ground
- Party: Whig; Know Nothings
- Spouse: Sydney Calhoun Hall
- Children: 1
- Education: Lafayette College

James Morrison Harris (November 20, 1817 – July 16, 1898) was a representative from the third district of Maryland.

== Early life ==
James Morrison Harris was born on November 20, 1817, in Baltimore, Maryland, to David Harris. His father was a colonel of the 1st Regiment of the Maryland Volunteer Artillery of the War of 1812. He attended private schools in Baltimore. He attended Lafayette College in 1833. Due to an issue with his eyes, he left college before graduation. He then worked as a bank clerk in Baltimore. During this time, he founded the Mercantile Library Association of Baltimore with Charles Bradenbaugh. He studied law in the office of David Stewart in Baltimore and was admitted to the bar in 1843. Following admission to the bar, he spent a year in Europe. He traveled to England, France, Germany, and Italy.

== Career ==
Following his return, Harris began practicing law in Baltimore. He also wrote articles for magazines. He was a Whig candidate for the Maryland House of Representatives. He was a presidential elector for Zachary Taylor.

Harris was elected as a candidate of the American Party to the Thirty-fourth, Thirty-fifth, and Thirty-sixth Congresses (March 4, 1855 – March 3, 1861). Harris's election to the 35th congress was contested by William P. Preston, but Preston was not recognized. His election to the 36th congress against William Pinkney Whyte was challenged by a house committee, but the committee failed to pass the resolution to have his district revote. During his tenure, he helped promote an appropriation bill of US$150,000 for the improvement of the Patapsco River and the Port of Baltimore. The bill was vetoed by President James Buchanan, but Congress overrode the veto. He also secured an appropriation of US$200,000 for the property and construction of a courthouse in Baltimore. Harris opposed secession and declined to be a candidate for renomination in 1860.

Harris continued to practice law. In 1867, he declined nomination for the Maryland constitutional convention. In 1875, he was the citizens' reform candidate for Maryland governor against John Lee Carroll. He ran alongside attorney general candidate Severn Teackle Wallis and they campaigned together. He ran again for Congress in 1876.

Harris organized the construction of the YMCA building on Charles and Saratoga streets in Baltimore. He was a trustee and served as the corresponding secretary of the First Presbyterian Church. He was a trustee of Lafayette College from 1865 to 1872. He served as master of the Fidelity Lodge of Masons.

== Personal life ==
Harris married Sydney Calhoun Hall, daughter of Benedict William Hall, of the Eutaw estate of Baltimore County. They had one son, W. Hall Harris.

Harris died of a heart ailment on July 16, 1898, at his "Ivy Hill" home on Harford Road in Baltimore. He was interred at the Westminster Presbyterian Burying Ground in Baltimore.

Party political offices
Preceded by Jacob Tome	Republican nominee for Governor of Maryland; 1875	Succeeded by James Albert Gary
U.S. House of Representatives
Preceded by Joshua Van Sant	Member of the U.S. House of Representatives from Maryland's 3rd congressional district 1855–1861	Succeeded by Cornelius Leary
