= Bellevue Avenue/Casino Historic District =

Historic district in Rhode Island, United States

- U.S. National Register of Historic Places
- U.S. Historic district
- U.S. National Historic Landmark District – Contributing property
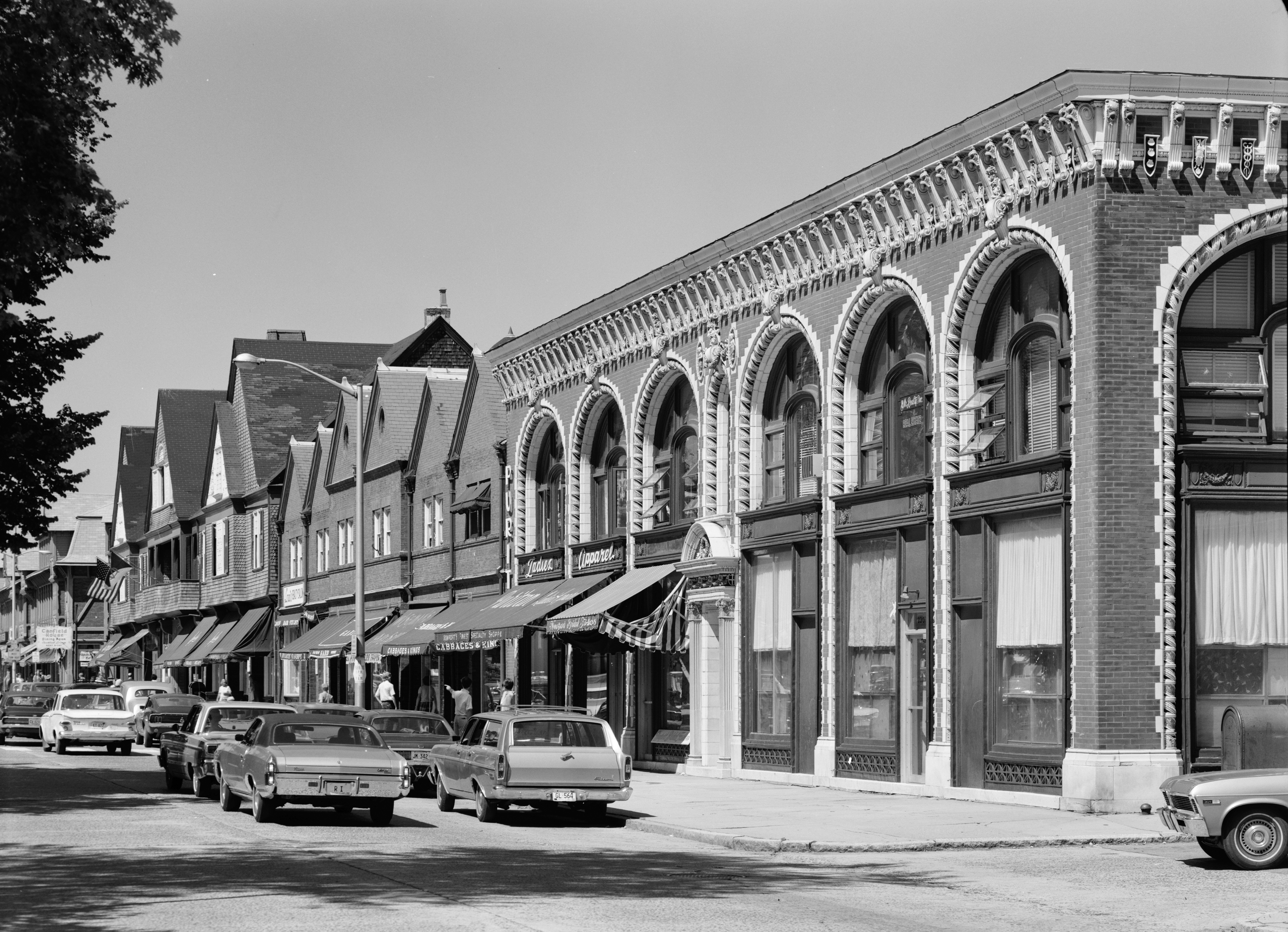
- Audrain Building on the right, Casino on the left, King Block in between (1970)

- Location within Rhode Island Location within the United States
- Location: 170-230 Bellvue Avenue, Newport, Rhode Island
- Coordinates: 41°28′57″N 71°18′28″W
- Area: 8 acres (3.2 ha)
- Architect: Multiple
- Architectural style: Shingle Style
- Part of: Bellevue Avenue Historic District (ID72000023)
- NRHP reference No.: 72000024

Significant dates
- Added to NRHP: December 08, 1972
- Designated NHLDCP: December 8, 1972

The Bellevue Avenue/Casino Historic District encompasses a one-block section of Bellevue Avenue in Newport, Rhode Island. Although Bellevue Avenue is best known for the large number of Gilded Age mansions which line it, especially further south, this block is a coherent collection of commercial buildings at the northern end of the mansion row. It is anchored around the Newport Casino, now the International Tennis Hall of Fame, and includes three other buildings on the east side of Bellevue Avenue between Memorial Boulevard and East Bowery Street.

The district was added to the National Register of Historic Places in 1972.

== History ==
The district was listed on the National Register of Historic Places in 1972, and is completely contained within the National Historic Landmark District Bellevue Avenue Historic District.

The first building on the block was the Travers Building, 170-184 Bellevue, which was designed by Richard Morris Hunt and built in 1870-71 for William Travers. It is a 2-1/2 story brick structure, with applied half-timbering and topped by a mansard roof. It houses ten storefronts.

The Newport Casino was built second, and its facilities occupy most of the block east of Bellevue Avenue. A National Historic Landmark, it was designed by McKim, Mead and White, and built in 1879-81.

The King Block (204-214 Bellevue) was built in 1892-1893 and was designed by Perkins and Betton of Boston, Massachusetts for Leroy King. It is faced on brown brick and houses six storefronts, and is situated just south of the Casino.

The Audrain Building (222 Bellevue) completes the block; it was designed by Bruce Price of New York City and built in 1902-3 for Adolf L Audrain. It is also divided into six storefronts, set off from each visually by arches. Recently renovated and restored, it is currently the home of the Audrain Automobile Museum.

== Gallery ==
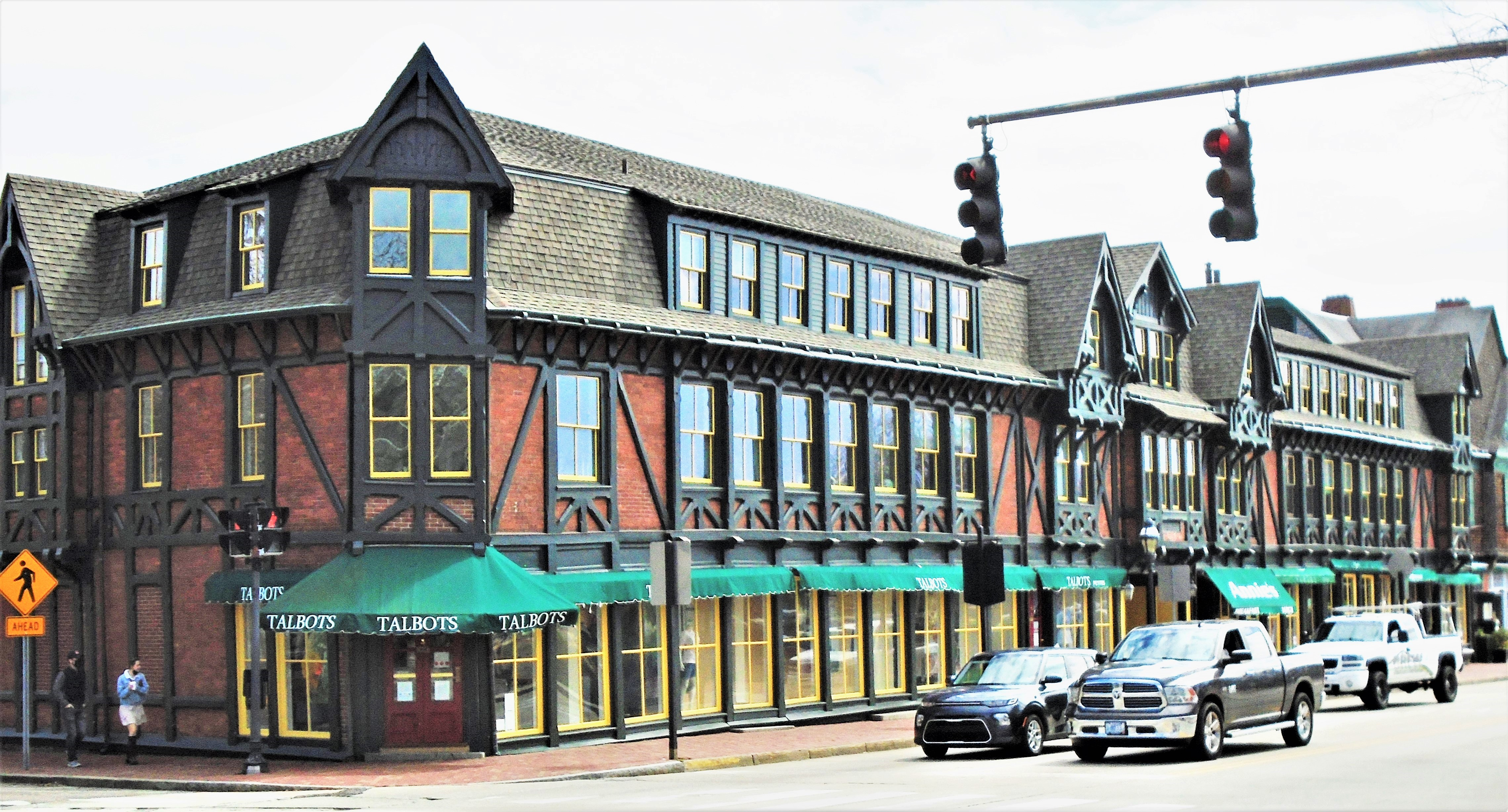
The Travers Block

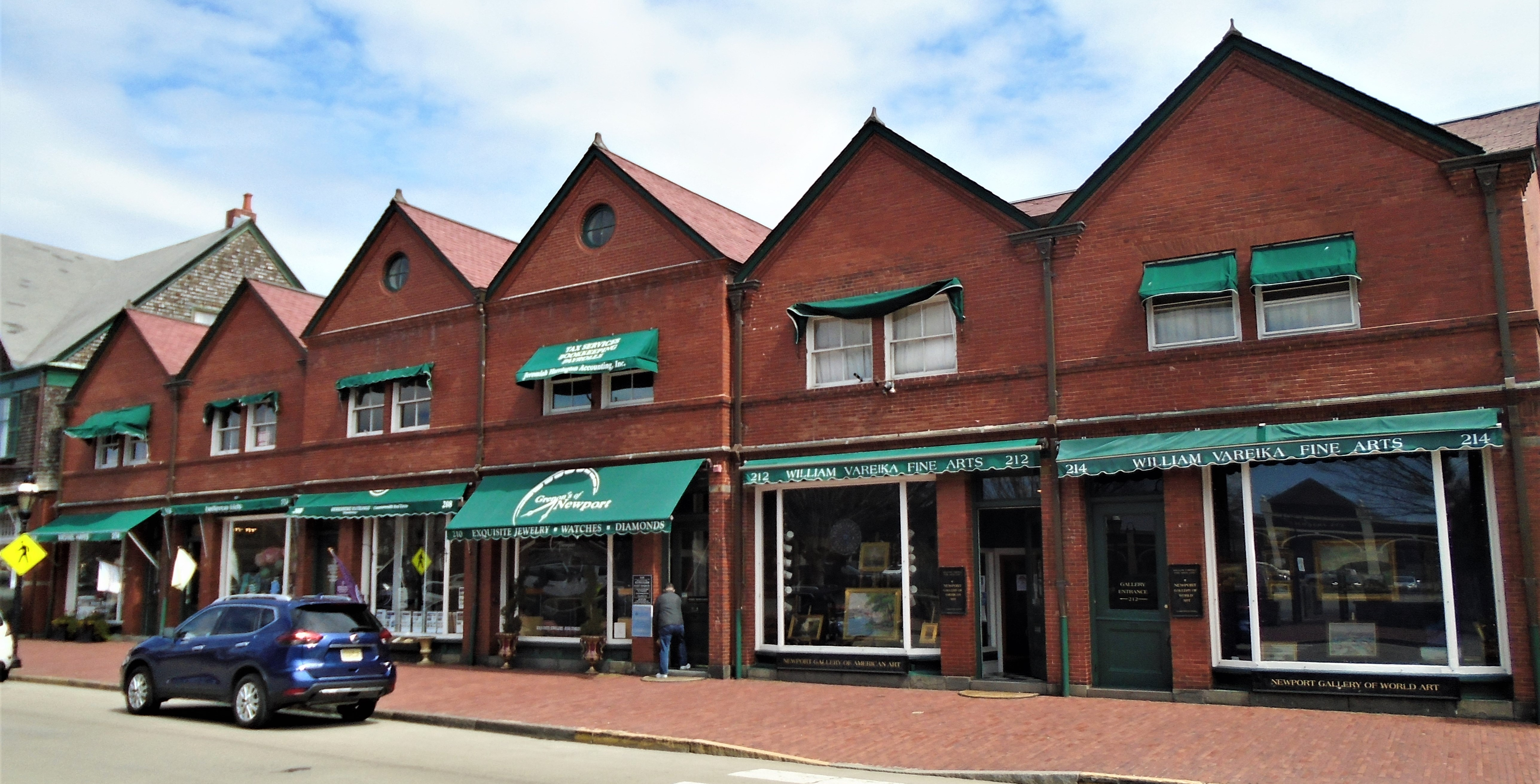
The King Block

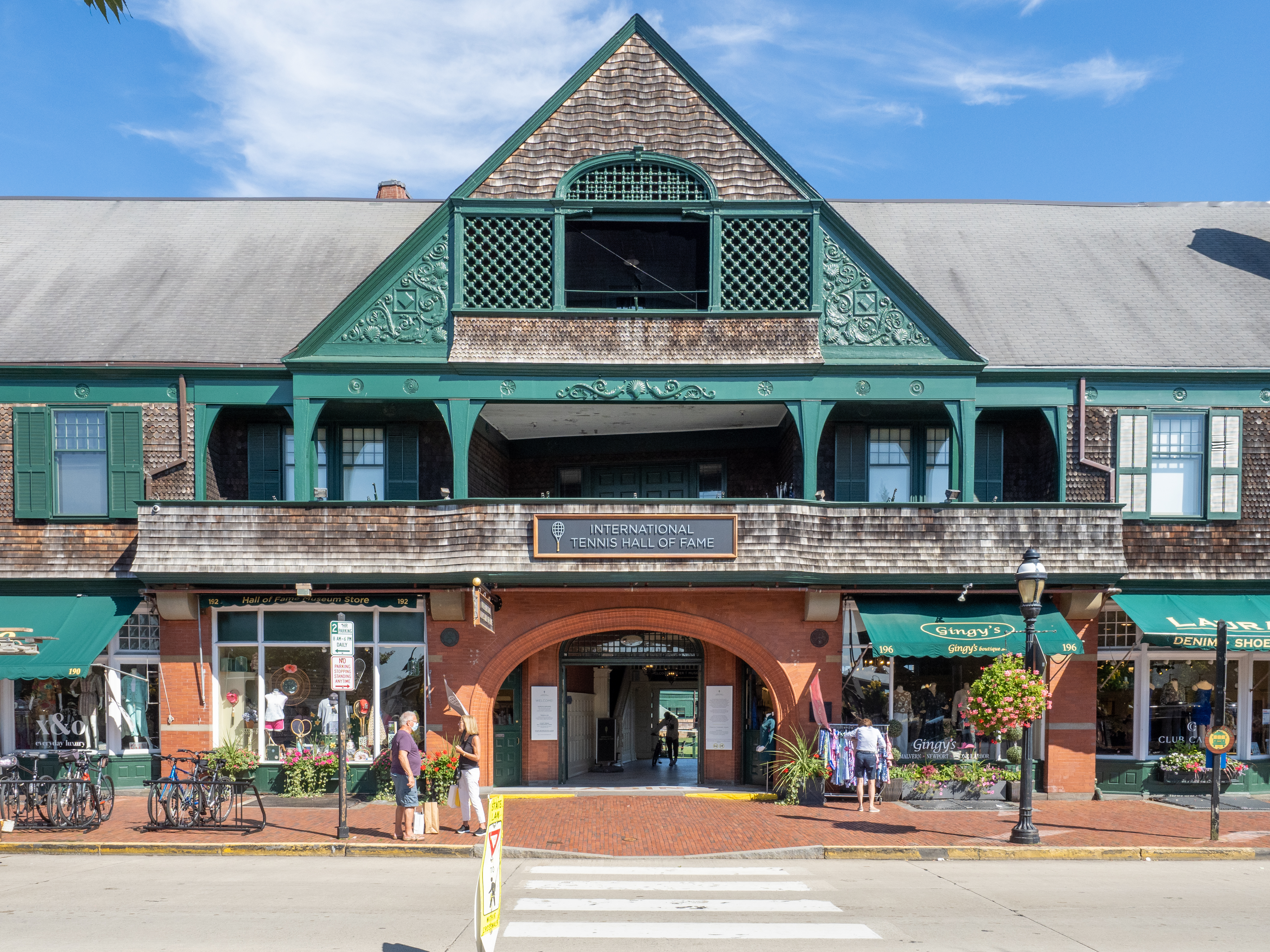
Newport Casino

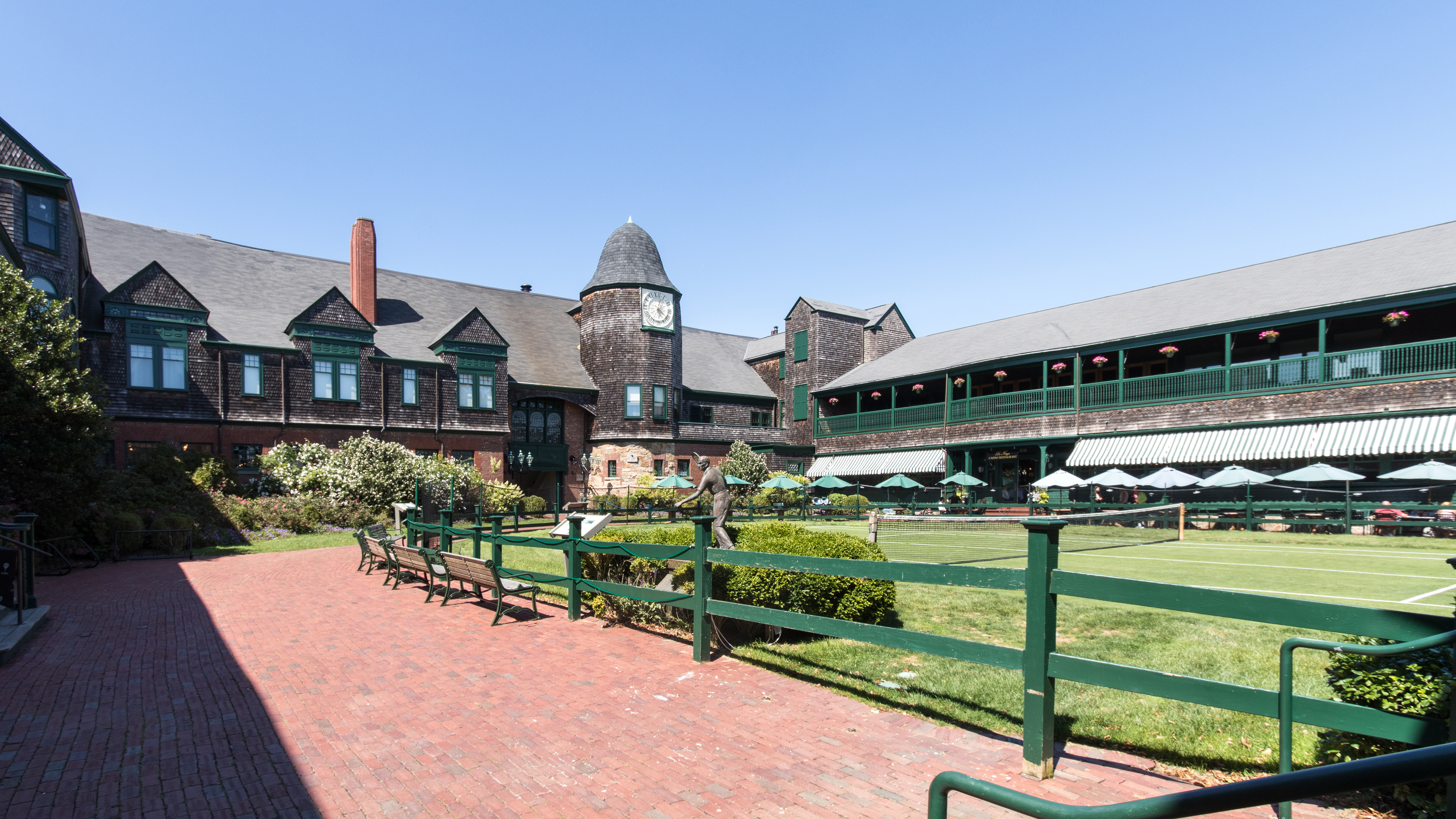
Newport Casino

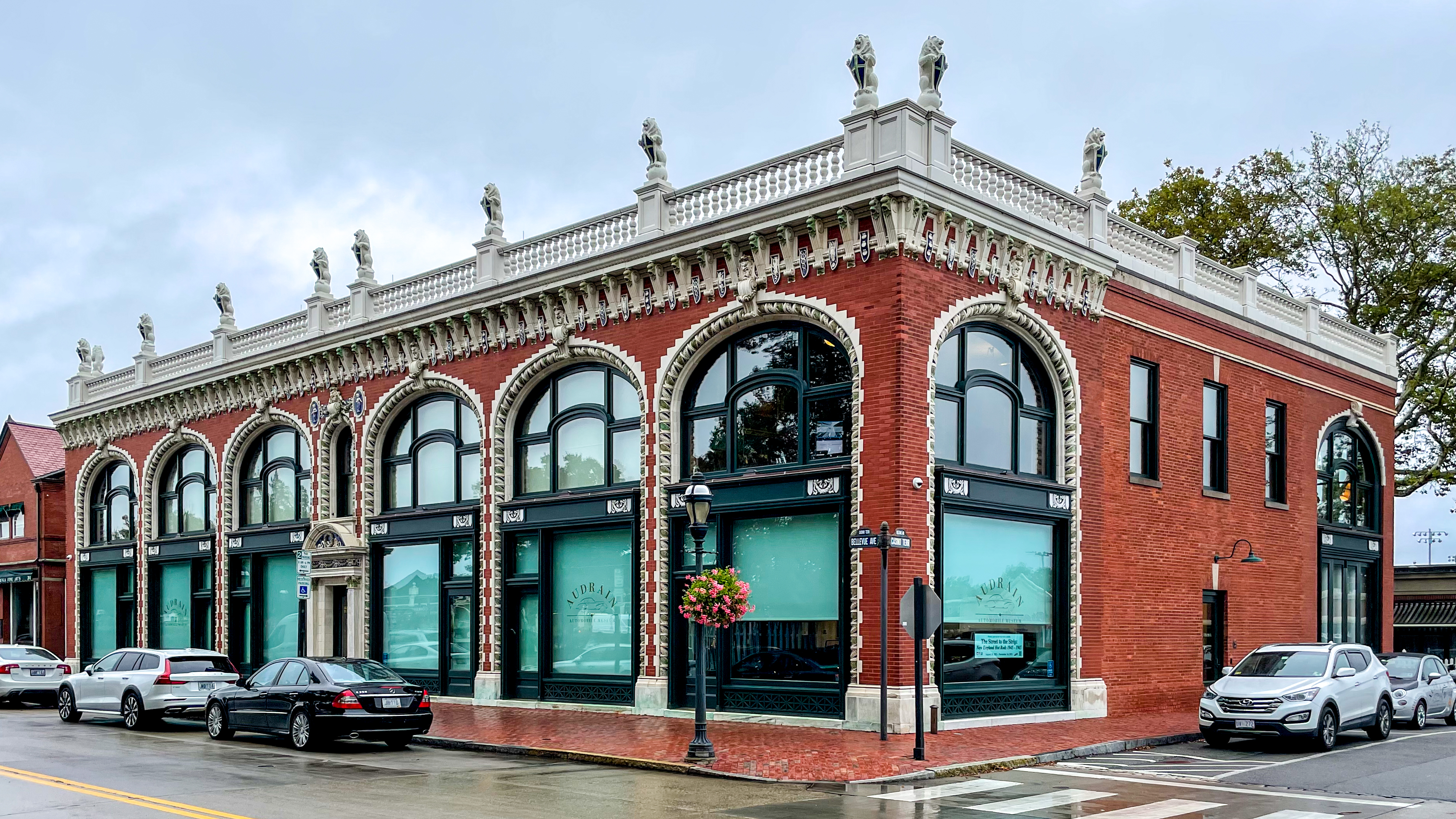
Audrain Building

== See also ==
- National Register of Historic Places listings in Newport County, Rhode Island
