= Royal Phelps =

American politician

Royal Phelps (1809 – 1884) was a businessperson from the United States and Venezuela. He was a member of the New York State Assembly (New York Co., 14th D.) in 1862.

New York State Assembly
Preceded by Robert C. Hutchings	New York State Assembly; New York County, 14th District; 1862	Succeeded by Robert C. Hutchings
