= Webb C. Ball =

American jeweler (1848–1922)

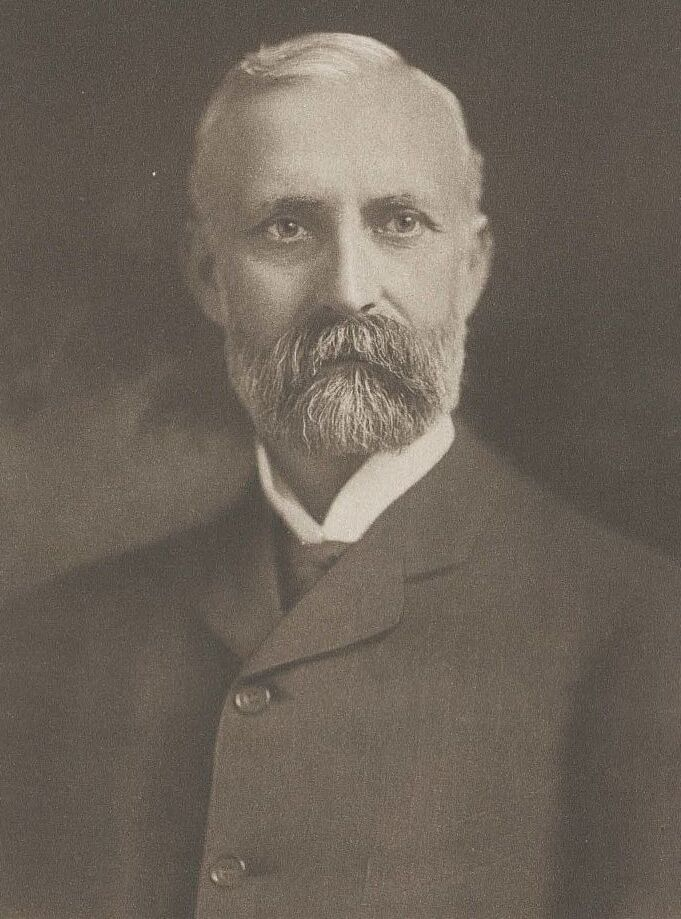
- Ball in a 1914 publication
- Born: Webster Clay Ball; October 6, 1848; Knox County, Ohio, U.S.
- Died: March 6, 1922 (aged 73); Cleveland Heights, Ohio, U.S.
- Occupation: Jeweler
- Spouse: Florence I. Young (m. 1879)
- Children: 4

Webster Clay Ball (October 6, 1848 – March 6, 1922) was a jeweler and watchmaker born in Fredericktown, Ohio, who founded the Ball Watch Company. When Standard Time was adopted in 1883, he was the first jeweler to use time signals from the United States Naval Observatory, bringing accurate time to Cleveland.

== Personal life ==
Born on a farm in Knox County, Ohio, Webb C. Ball was married in 1879 to Florence I. Young, of Kenton, Ohio. They had one son, Sidney Y. Ball (born September 19, 1880), and three daughters, Wilma Ball, Florence Ball, and Alice Ball Andrews. He was the son of Aaron Taylor Ball (born December 19, 1820, in Fredericktown, Ohio) and Sidney Ann Clay (born April 2, 1820, in Frederick, Maryland). His grandparents were Zenas Ball (November 15, 1792, in South Orange, New Jersey – October 3, 1860) and Sarah Taylor (May 24, 1796 – March 30, 1860). He died at his home in Cleveland Heights, Ohio, survived by his wife and children. His grandchildren included Isabel Andrews Burgess, a Nixon appointee to the National Transportation Safety Board.

== Watchmaker history ==
After a two-year apprenticeship to a jeweler, Ball settled in Cleveland, Ohio, to join a jewelry store. However, a tragic event would soon change the course of Ball’s career.

On April 18, 1891, there was a head-on collision on the Lake Shore and Michigan Southern Railway single-track mainline near Kipton station, about 40 miles west of Cleveland Ohio, involving No. 14, an eastbound, high-speed mail train, and the Toledo Express, a westbound passenger train. Nine people were killed in the wreck, six of them on No. 14. The Toledo Express was supposed to take the passing track at Kipton station so No. 14, which had superiority, could maintain speed. However, the Toledo Express was behind schedule and still on the mainline when the two trains met.

During the investigation, it was determined that the Toledo Express conductor's watch had briefly stopped, losing approximately four minutes. As trains at that time ran on carefully-planned timetable rules to avoid conflicts, accurate and trustworthy timepieces were critical for safe operation. That the wreck was ultimately the result of a faulty watch, the railroad’s officials commissioned Ball to be their Chief Time Inspector.

In that role, Ball was tasked with establishing timekeeping standards and a reliable railroad chronometer inspection system. Ball established strict guidelines for the manufacturing of rugged and reliable precision railroad timepieces, including requirements for resistance to magnetism, reliable timekeeping in five positions, isochronism, power reserve, and a standardized dial arrangement. His guidelines required that accurate records be maintained for each timepiece, to be updated at each regularly-scheduled inspection.

His original jewelry business in Cleveland grew into the Ball Watch Company (currently headquartered in La Chaux-de-Fonds, Switzerland), which used other watch companies' movements, perfecting them and then reselling them. Ball Watch Company also ordered watches complete from other watch companies. Ball used movements from the top American manufacturers, Elgin, Hamilton, and Waltham. The company switched to Swiss Avia movements as early as the 1940s. The Waltham Watch Company complied immediately with the requirements of Ball's guidelines, later followed by Elgin National Watch Company and most of the other American manufacturers: Aurora, Hamilton, Hampden, E. Howard & Co., Illinois, Seth Thomas, later on joined by some Swiss watch manufacturers: Audemars Piguet, Gallet, Longines, Record Watch, Vacheron Constantin.

Webb C. Ball became the vice president of the Hamilton Watch Company and focused his efforts on developing watches for the railroads. Minutes of Proceedings of Third Triennial Convention of the Brotherhood of Locomotive Engineers and Trainmen held in the B of LE Auditorium, Cleveland, Ohio on May 31, 1921, at 2 pm the convention was called to order by Grand Chief Engineer W.S. Stone, at this afternoon session Webb C. Ball was introduced, he made a speech, a resolution was unanimously passed, and he was made an Honorary Member of the Brotherhood.

Ball watches were the first wrist watches allowed to be used on the railroads, using a Swiss manual-winding movement, followed quickly by the first American-made wrist watch on "the roads", Elgin.

The firm was family owned by direct descendants until the 1990s when the right to use the name was sold. The new firm continues the tradition, using Swiss-made (primarily ETA) movements and making watches for sportsmen and even for some small railroads.

At the end of his career, Webb C. Ball was overseeing over 125,000 miles (201,000 km) of rail tracks in the United States, Mexico & Canada, having greatly contributed to the safety of all railroad systems. The Horological Institute of America celebrated his efforts on October 20, 1921.

== See also ==
- Owney (dog)
- Railway signalling
