= US military watches =

Military equipment

US military watches are watches that are issued to US military personnel.

== General watches ==
=== US Army specification 55-1B ===
This watch was known for its luminous hands and markers, had a seven jewel movement, an olive drab cotton strap, and a stainless steel case. It has been described as "reasonably shock resistant and waterproof". They are accurate to 30 seconds per day, and are produced by Movado, Waltham, Elgin, and Hamilton.

=== MIL-W-3818A ===
Revision A of specification MIL-W-3818 was released on March 12, 1956 to include the following:
A. Reduce the variety of grades and types of watches.
B. Assure consistent quality of items.
C. Eliminate testing requirements of one year and substitute in lieu thereof a guarantee provision.
D. Incorporate a new case design.

==== MIL-W-3818B ====
- October 17, 1962

The B revision was meant to provide a single standard for a 17 jewel watch with a life of at least two years.

It required the 1.40″ metal case and all metal pieces be protected by a finish or preservative, except parts which would be adversely effected if so treated. A black, non-ferrous metal dial with numerals and graduations in white, a triangular hour indice at 12 was required to be luminescent yellow and the other hour markers were green. Hands made of cartridge brass, painted white, filled with green luminescent paint, the tip of the second hand was luminescent orange with tritium (hydrogen 3) as the luminescent.

It required a 17 jewel bearings, stem wound and set, a power reserve of 36 hours and a 30-second daily accuracy rate. It is straight-knurled and includes the "dimple" typical of similar period Benrus U.S. military watches (e.g. Benrus Type I / II and the MIL-W-46374). The acrylic crystal is referred to as "copolymer plastic". Drawing C 8636227 was to be used for the band, but was amended on January 12, 1966, to now follow the newly published MIL-S-46383 Type II strap – color black.

Benrus Watch Co., Longines-Wittnauer Watch Co., Mathey-Tissot Watch Co. (Frankfort Arsenal documents refer to the company as *Matbey*.) and Clinton Watch Co. of Chicago submitted samples in bid for the specification, with only the Benrus meeting it. On September 16, 1963, Benrus was notified that its product was now on the Qualified Products List for Specification MIL-W-3818B. On February 2, 1964, the Marine Corps submitted a Military Interdepartmental Purchase Request to purchase 10,849 MIL-W-3818B watches, a request for proposal was issued to Benrus on February 7, 1964. Benrus quoted a unit price of $28.28. Bulova alleged that Benrus merely imported cases and sold watch movements from foreign sources. Benrus’ documents were submitted and showed that it imported the movement and dial setting, dial stem and spring bars and that the case, crown, attachments, packaging material, and jewel bearings were all domestically produced. The costs of the domestic components were in excess of 50 percent of the costs, meeting the requirement.

=== MIL-W-46374 ===
- 46374C 1983

== Navigation watches ==
=== A-11 ===
1943 US Army Air Force - A-11 Navigation watch with 15 jewels, a black or white dial, a dull stainless steel case, and an olive drab or black cotton band.

- British designation 6B/234
- British Bulova Mark VIII, with an A. Schild SA Cal. 1238 movement (10.5 Swiss size), Swiss designed movement manufactured in the US by Bulova as the cal. 10AKCSH, so: cal. 10AK, CS = center sweep.
- inner magnetic cover made of Invar, which is an iron-nickel-carbon-chromium alloy
- produced by Elgin, Bulova, and Waltham
- some dials with white, unluminated, others with lumination
- Navy Bureau of Aeronautics specified lume
- coin edge on caseback and bezel
- center seconds
- 8/0 gauge
- Elgin model 1783 grade 539
- sweep seconds
- at least 15 jewels, including one for the rear of the second hand pinion, with the A-11 coinciding with the movement from sub second hand movements with 15 jewels to center seconds, the added jewel on the second hand pinion of modified sub second movements raised the jewel count to 16

==== A-17 ====
U.S. Air Force watch specified by MIL-W-6433

- Produced by Waltham Watch Company
- Manufactured in 3 separate runs, one in 1950, another in 1952 and the last in 1956.
- 17 Jewels.
- Center seconds hand.
- 6/0 Waltham movement.
- Hacking function.
- Radium painted numerals.
- Stainless steel coin edge case.

==== A-17A ====
Specified as MIL-W-6433A

- Produced from 1956 to 1962.
- Manufacured by Bulova Watch Company, Elgin National Watch Company.
- 17 jewels.
- Center seconds hand.
- Hacking function.
- Radium painted numerals.

=== GG-W-113 ===
- produced by Benrus, Gallet/Marathon, Hamilton, Waltham
- 17 jewel
- tritium lume paint
- black nylon band

== Dive watches ==
=== FSX-797 ===
Navy spec for submersible watch, with rigorous dust and moisture specifications, tested under pressure while submerged in water. As the US military gained experience with amphibious landings they developed new strategies, one of them was the Navy's formation of combat demolition units. In the summer of 1943, in Fort Pierce Florida, training for these units began, one emphasis of their training was swimming and amphibious landings. In Operation Overlord during the D-Day landings, the Navy's CDU teams on Utah Beach were able to clear 1,600 yards of beach of steel and concrete obstacles, paving the way for the liberation of France, and the end of World War II.

=== 18W8 (INT) wristwatch (watertight) "buship" "canteen" dive watch ===
An iconic post military watch and a result of the Navy's FSX-797, colloquially known as the US Navy's Bureau of Ships "canteen watch", started out with Jacques Depollier & Sons' waterproof and dustproof strap watch. The first known example of the now common "screw down crown", unlike later examples of the canteen watch, this one lacked the emblematic chain anchoring the crown to the watch. One unusual feature of this watch was the heat disk on the back of the case to prevent the heat from the wearer's wrist from causing the oil in the watch to drip out of the jewel holes. Depollier ads claim that the US Army Signal Corps used the case to protect watch movement stores in long-term storage. The gasketed and spring-loaded screw-down crown is kept on the case by two flanges on the crown held against two grooves on the case. US Navy Bureau of Ships specification 18W8, published in December 1944. A matte black metal dial, two vertical luminous dots over 12, along with one for every other hour, the hour and minute hand, as well as the tip of the second hand covered in radium lume. With war shortages, the case was made of chromed base metal. A Koroseal gasket is used inside the crown. The crystal is tempered glass with a metal rim soldered to the case, creating a watertight seal. The 17-jewel sweep-second movement is covered by another Koroseal gasket under the caseback.

Later, better-known dive watches would come from Elgin and Hamilton.

=== 22717A ===
With the advent of SCUBA diving, the canteen watches, limited to 49 feet, needed to be replaced. The military needed watches, issued in 1961 for special forces, that could be submerged up to 400 ft and were nonmagnetic. A new spec needed to be included to accommodate this; spec 22717A, which superseded several previous specs. With SCUBA's commercial and public use, as well as the natural evolution of watches, the military started buying the commercial dive watches that were entering the market. Popular examples included the Benrus 7951 and 7952, the Blancpain 50 Fathoms, the Doxa 300T, the Rolex Oyster Perpetual, and Submariner, the Tudor Submariner and Prince, the Seiko DEO-95, and the Zodiac Sea Wolf. The first watch made for 22717A was made by Allen Tornek in the Rayville Factory, a representative of Blancpain, it was the Tornek-Rayville TR900.

== See also ==
- List of watch manufacturers
- Pilot watch – Wristwatch designed for use by aircraft pilots
- Trench watch – Early wristwatch design used in World War I
- Military watches – Wristwatch designed for military use
- Mission timer – Clock for measuring time duration
- List of 24-hour watch brands
