= John Whitfield Bunn and Jacob Bunn =

American financier (1831–1920)

John Whitfield Bunn
- Born: June 21, 1831; Hunterdon County, New Jersey, U S.
- Died: June 7, 1920 (aged 88); Springfield, Illinois, U.S.
- Occupations: Industrialist, financier

This article concerns John Whitfield Bunn, Jacob Bunn, and the entrepreneurs who were interconnected with the Bunn brothers through association or familial and genealogical connection.

Jacob Bunn
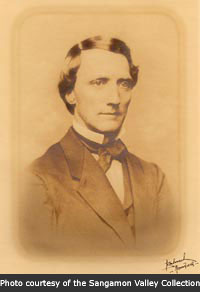
- Bunn Sr. in the mid-19th century
- Born: March 18, 1814; Hunterdon County, New Jersey, U.S.
- Died: October 16, 1897 (aged 83); Springfield, Illinois, U.S.
- Occupations: Industrialist, financier

John Whitfield Bunn (June 21, 1831 – June 7, 1920) was an American corporate leader, financier, industrialist, and personal friend of Abraham Lincoln, whose work and leadership involved a broad range of institutions ranging from Midwestern railroads, international finance, and Republican Party politics, to corporate consultation, globally significant manufacturing, and the various American stock exchanges. He was of great historical importance in the commercial, civic, political, and industrial development and growth of the state of Illinois and the American Midwest, during both the nineteenth century and the twentieth century. John Whitfield Bunn was born June 21, 1831, in Hunterdon County, New Jersey. Although every one of the business institutions co-founded or built by the Bunn Brothers has ceased to exist, and fallen purely into the realm of history, each of these businesses left an important legacy of honorable industrial, commercial, and civic vision for Illinois, the Midwest, and the United States.

Jacob Bunn (March 18, 1814 – October 16, 1897), an older brother of John Whitfield Bunn, was also an important Illinois industrialist, financier, and close friend of Abraham Lincoln.

== Early life and early business experiences ==
John W. Bunn was the third son of Henry Bunn and Mary (Sigler) Bunn, both of Hunterdon County, New Jersey. The Bunn family was Presbyterian, and they recorded the baptisms of several children in a Presbyterian Church located at one time in Alexandria, Hunterdon County, New Jersey. There exists evidence that the Bunn family ancestors had originally purchased property from the heirs of William Penn.

Henry Bunn was born October 19, 1772, in Alexandria Township, Hunterdon County, New Jersey. Henry Bunn was the son of Jacob Bunn (born 1736; died 1808) and Maria Elizabetha (surname unknown) (born 1744; died 1817). Henry Bunn married Mary Sigler (born April 7, 1788; died July 31, 1833). Henry Bunn and Mary (Sigler) Bunn owned a prosperous farm in Hunterdon County, New Jersey, and at the time of Henry Bunn's death in 1859 he left an estate valued at a quantity in excess of $34,000. There exists evidence that Henry Bunn, the father of Jacob Bunn, John Whitfield Bunn, and George Whitfield Bunn, engaged in the banking business in Hunterdon County, New Jersey.

Jacob Bunn married Elizabeth Jane Ferguson (born May 12, 1832; died 1885), daughter of Benjamin Ferguson and Sarah (Irwin) Ferguson, both natives of Washington County, Pennsylvania. Benjamin Ferguson was a building contractor who contributed to the construction of the old Illinois State Capitol in Springfield. Sarah Irwin was the sister of the bankers and merchants Robert Irwin (born November 7, 1808; died 1865) and John Irwin (born January 20, 1804; died 1857). Robert Irwin acted as the personal debt collector for Abraham Lincoln, and served as a member of the board of directors of the State Bank of Illinois. The Irwins were all natives of Monongahela City, Pennsylvania, were Presbyterian, and were of Scottish origin. A daughter of Robert Irwin married William Marston, a Wall Street speculator and financier who often worked in partnership with Cornelius Vanderbilt, and who was responsible for the nearly $7 million stock price rally of the Michigan & Prairie du Chien Railroad Company in 1865. William Marston gained a personal profit of between $1 and $2 million, in 1865, from the artificial rally, which he manipulated and caused when he rapidly purchased nearly 22,000 shares of stock in the Michigan & Prairie du Chien Railroad Company. The Irwin family also was interconnected with the Holden Family of Cleveland, Ohio, which owned the Island Creek Coal Company, the Pond Creek Coal Company, and the Forest City Publishing Company, publisher of The Plain Dealer newspaper, and the Hollenden Hotel.

John Bunn spent his childhood and early adulthood on the family farm located near Milford, New Jersey.

In 1847, at the age of 16, John W. Bunn left New Jersey to join his older brother Jacob Bunn in the wholesale grocery trade in Springfield, Sangamon County, Illinois, having been induced to make the migration to Illinois by the positive and promising description that Jacob Bunn had furnished during a return visit to the New Jersey farm where both men had been raised.

In 1858, John W. Bunn achieved the status of partner in the wholesale grocery firm of "J. Bunn Company."

The Springfield, Illinois, grocery enterprise altered its corporate name to reflect the new change in partnership, changing its official name to "J. & J. W. Bunn Company."

As an adult, he achievied a prominent status among the commercial leadership of Illinois. Through his position he was able to form a close friendship with statesman and lawyer Abraham Lincoln. He became one of the most important members of Lincoln's political network, and was described by historian and scholar George A. Lawrence as one of the closest personal and political friends of the future president.

=== Friendship with Abraham Lincoln, middle and later life in Illinois, and industrial contributions to Illinois and the United States ===
Abraham Lincoln acted as the attorney for Jacob Bunn, who was the older brother of John W. Bunn. In his very own words, in the relation of an interview concerning his personal memoirs and acquaintanceship with Abraham Lincoln, John Bunn stated that he and Lincoln had been extremely close friends and political allies. Abraham Lincoln served on the committee for the formation of the Alton & Springfield Railroad Company along with Jacob Bunn, leading Springfield merchant and banker John Williams, John Todd Stuart, John Calhoun, B. C. Webster, J. N. Brown, Pascal P. Enos, William Pickrell, and S. B. Opdycke.

Jacob Bunn and John Whitfield Bunn, along with many of their colleagues and friends, such as Stephen Trigg Logan, John Williams, and Ozias M. Hatch, became close friends of Abraham Lincoln, and assisted Lincoln in various ways in his 1860 presidential campaign. As a part of his 1860 presidential campaign strategy Lincoln acquired, in May, 1859, the Illinois Staats-Anzeiger, a German-language newspaper of Springfield, Illinois, to further the cause of Republican Party politics among the German-speaking community of the region. Lincoln acquired the Illinois Staats-Anzeiger through his banker Jacob Bunn, who was a close personal friend and client of Lincoln. Jacob Bunn and his brother John Whitfield Bunn were close personal friends of Lincoln and his family, and were industrialists and financiers who established a national and international network of industrial corporations ranging from Chicago railroads and banks to manufacturing corporations of global scale in production and economic impact. John Whitfield Bunn served as the treasurer of, and as one of the initial financial contributors to, the $5,000 1860 presidential campaign fund for Lincoln whose establishment and formation had been originally suggested to John W. Bunn by Judge Stephen Trigg Logan, a former law partner of Lincoln. Jacob Bunn, John Williams, Ozias M. Hatch, Thomas Condell, and Robert Irwin were also among the initial financial contributors to the campaign fund.

John Whitfield Bunn spent the remainder of his life in Illinois, and maintained a varied and successful commercial, industrial, and philanthropic career that lasted from 1847 until 1920. A multimillionaire, John W. Bunn exhibited financial commitment and philanthropic loyalty to public causes in Illinois.

During the period lasting from 1847 until 1920, John W. Bunn accomplished numerous commercial and industrial objectives, and contributed to the development of numerous distinct industrial and civic sectors of Illinois during the nineteenth century and the twentieth century. Many of the businesses and civic institutions with which the Bunn brothers and their extended family were connected are discussed below.

=== The J. & J. W. Bunn Grocery Company ===
Beginning as an entry-level employee in the wholesale grocery house owned by his brother, John rapidly ascended to increased levels of responsibility, not only within the grocery enterprise, but within a diverse array of additional commercial and civic organizations in Illinois, and throughout the United States as a whole. The J. & J. W. Bunn Grocery Company generated approximate sales of $200,000 around 1871. During the period when John W. Bunn acted with executive leadership within the J. & J. W. Bunn Grocery Company, the profitability of the firm increased, and in 1880 the sales volume of the firm reached $450,000, with prediction in 1880 of sales volume growth to $500,000 for 1881. This venture subsequently became known as "Bunn Capitol Wholesale Grocery Company" in the 1950s. George R. Bunn Jr. managed this company and created a beverage division that eventually turned into the Bunn-O-Matic Corporation, which also owns the "BUNN" brand.

=== Illinois Watch Company and Sangamo Electric Company ===
John W. Bunn was an active participant in the development of industrial production of pocket watches for the railroads, and served as a founder, director, and Vice President of the Illinois Watch Company of Springfield, Illinois. The Illinois Watch Company, a globally significant corporation with respect to the railroad logistics industry, operated branch corporate offices in New York City, Chicago, and San Francisco. The assets of the Illinois Watch Company were sold, during 1927 and 1928, to the Hamilton Watch Company of Lancaster, Pennsylvania, for a sum in excess of $5 million. John Whitfield Bunn also worked with Jacob Bunn and Benjamin Hamilton Ferguson in the management of the Illinois Watch Company. The Illinois Watch Company was estimated by one source to have paid out nearly $20 million in employee wages by approximately 1920.

The Sangamo Electric Company was organized on 11 January 1899 in Springfield, Illinois, by Jacob Bunn Jr., Henry Bunn, Robert Carr Lanphier, and inventor Ludwig Gutmann. The corporation grew institutionally as a division of the Illinois Watch Company, and developed global presence in the electric metering industry and defense industries. By the middle of the 1920s, Sangamo Electric had manufactured more than 5,000,000 electric meters. Sangamo made many important contributions to national defense during World War II, and developed the mercury watthour meter (1905), the sulphur-impregnated cylindrical paper condenser meter, different types of magnetos, amperehour meters, and the Delco amperehour meter for the first electric starters used in automobiles. The company eventually had a presence in nearly every major country of the world by 1939. Sangamo Electric Company made many major contributions to the aircraft components industries of the United States, and Henry Bunn, the son of Jacob Bunn Sr., was an aviator and entrepreneur whose vision for Sangamo Electric was crucial to the entrance of the company into the aviation industry. Furthermore, Sangamo Electric Company acquired Capitol Aviation, Inc., a general fixed-base operator (FBO) with offices throughout the United States.

The name and logo of Sangamo Electric have come into use again with Sangamo BioSciences, founded by Edward Oliver Lanphier II, great-grandson of one of the Sangamo Electric founders, Robert Carr Lanphier Sr.

=== Springfield Marine Bank ===
Bunn served for many years as president and director of the historically significant Springfield Marine Bank of Springfield, Illinois. As President of the Springfield Marine Bank, which was the oldest bank in Springfield, Illinois (having been established in 1851), John W. Bunn built the financial resources of the institution successfully. In 1920, the deposit accounts held at the Springfield Marine Bank amounted to approximately $5 million.

=== Selz, Schwab & Company of Chicago ===
Eventually, John W. Bunn expanded his activities to include numerous industrial and financial contributions to the economic growth and development of Chicago, Illinois. Bunn acted as a founding member of the shoe and boot manufacturing firm of M. Selz & Company, and held the executive position of Vice President with the shoe manufacturer for several years prior to his death. The Chicago firm, known later as Selz, Schwab & Company, rapidly achieved international scope in its markets, and extraordinary magnitude and profitability in its manufacturing business. The Selz, Schwab Company at one time owned and operated eleven factories, and after the company dissolved and ceased to exist, during the Great Depression, one of the factories was transferred to five employees who had begun their careers with the firm as office boys. Prior to 1894, the Selz, Schwab Company had generated annual revenues in excess of $2 million. The Selz, Schwab Shoe Company once enjoyed the status of being one of the largest shoe and boot manufacturers, if not the largest shoe and boot manufacturer, in the world, and was known to have filled individual foreign country orders to the scale of 1 million pairs of shoes, and 500,000 pairs of shoes. The corporate revenue was a multimillion-dollar figure in the early twentieth century, and the corporation rapidly grew to be one of the largest manufacturing concerns in the United States. By approximately 1931, one of the eleven factories owned by Selz, Schwab & Company was generating, by itself, $6 million annually.

=== Contribution to the development of the Illinois insurance industry ===
During the month of February 1867, Bunn was an incorporator of two separate insurance companies. He served as an incorporator of the American Standard Life Insurance Company of Springfield, Illinois, on February 25, 1867. Like his younger brother John W. Bunn, Jacob Bunn was also an incorporator of the American Standard Life Insurance Company. Additionally, John W. Bunn served as an incorporator of the DuBois Insurance Company of Springfield, Illinois, on February 20, 1867.

=== Franklin Life Insurance Company ===
Of historical note is the fact that merchant banker Benjamin Hamilton Ferguson, the brother-in-law of Jacob Bunn, served as an incorporator of the Franklin Life Insurance Company of Illinois. The Franklin Life Insurance Company had nearly $178 million of life insurance in force by the end of 1939, and had over $1 billion of life insurance in force by 1951. George Wallace Bunn Sr., a son of Jacob Bunn, and nephew of John Whitfield Bunn, had served as a member of the board of directors of the Lincoln Mutual Casualty Company of Springfield, Illinois, and also served as an incorporator of the Lincoln Casualty Company (successor to the Lincoln Mutual Casualty Company), also of Springfield, Illinois, in 1920/1921.

=== John Whitfield Bunn, Jacob Bunn, and Midwestern railroad development ===
The contributions to the commercial development of Chicago that the Bunn brothers made included a broad portfolio of directorships and executive contributions to several railroad corporations of special economic significance to Chicago, Springfield, Illinois, and St. Louis, Missouri. Both Jacob and John W. Bunn were elected to the board of directors of the Hannibal and Naples Railroad Company in 1874.

=== Kansas City Air Line Railway Company ===
John W. Bunn contributed to the financing and incorporation of the Kansas City Air Line Railway Company, a corporation capitalized initially in 1879 at $600,000, and based in Springfield, Illinois, which served as a western expansion of the preexisting Indianapolis, Decatur & Springfield Railroad Company, and that was intended to connect the Indianapolis, Decatur & Springfield Railroad Company line to the Chicago & Alton Railroad Company line.

== Mid life career ==
=== Terre Haute & Peoria Railroad Company; and Toledo, Peoria & Western Railroad Company ===
John W. Bunn also served as a member of the board of directors of the Terre Haute & Peoria Railroad Company, a $5.4 million (as measured by equity capital in 1893) corporation whose principal office was Decatur, Illinois. Additionally, John W. Bunn was a member of the board of directors of the Toledo, Peoria & Western Railroad Company, a corporation whose equity capital exceeded $4 million in 1893.

=== North & Southern Railway Company ===
John W. Bunn served on the board of directors of the North & South Railroad Company of Illinois, a corporation capitalized at $2.8 million in 1890, and whose corporate precursor had been the St. Louis & Chicago Railroad Company.

=== Wabash Railway Company of Illinois ===
John W. Bunn served as founder and as the President of the Wabash Railway Company of Illinois in 1877. The Wabash Railroad system possessed approximately 16,000 rail cars (rolling stock) in 1880.

=== Wabash Eastern Railroad Company ===
John Whitfield Bunn served as one of the five incorporators of the Wabash Eastern Railroad of Illinois, along with Gen. George Smith, Charles Henrotin, Abram M. Pence, and John N. Harlan. The Wabash Eastern Railroad Company was incorporated in May, 1889, with principal corporate offices at Chicago, Illinois, and an initial capitalization of $12 million. Bunn served as incorporator and director with Charles Henrotin, George W. Smith, John Harlan, and Abram M. Pence, all of Chicago.

=== Wabash Railroad Company ===
John W. Bunn participated as a principal founder, consolidator, and organizer of the Wabash Railroad Company that resulted from the consolidation of 1889. The Wabash Railroad Company of 1889, of which John W. Bunn was a principal corporate founder, began its corporate existence with a capitalization of $52 million. The Wabash Railroad Company of 1889 comprised the former Toledo & Western Railroad Company, the Detroit & State Line Railroad Company, the previously existing Wabash Railroad Company, the Wabash Eastern Railroad Company of Indiana, and the Wabash Eastern Railroad Company of Illinois. John W. Bunn also served as a member of the first board of directors of the Wabash Railroad Company that was created through the 1889 railroad corporation consolidation. By 1902 the Wabash Railroad Company had corporate assets that amounted to slightly less than $150 million.

=== Springfield City Railway Company ===
John W. Bunn assumed an active role in the development of intra-urban transportational infrastructure in Springfield, Illinois, and helped to establish and build the Springfield City Railway Company in March 1866.

=== Belleville City Railway Company ===
In 1867, John W. Bunn acted as an incorporator of the $50,000 Belleville City Railway Company of Belleville, Illinois.

=== Chicago & Alton Railroad Company ===
Jacob Bunn, also a railroad capitalist, the older brother of John Whitfield Bunn, had served in 1861 as one of the official reorganizers and incorporators of the Chicago & Alton Railroad Company, along with other Chicago corporate and civic leaders including William B. Ogden. The Chicago & Alton Railroad Company, having undergone consolidation on several occasions, possessed issued equity stock of nearly $40 million in 1919.

=== Chicago Secure Depository Company ===
In March 1869, Jacob Bunn had also been an incorporator of the Chicago Secure Depository Company, a significant Chicago safety deposit institution whose incorporators included John B. Drake, Joseph M. Medill, Potter Palmer, Lyman Trumbull, John Wentworth, W. F. Coolbaugh, Jonathan Young Scammon (J. Young Scammon), Ezra B. McCagg, John Villiers Farwell, Ira Y. Munn, George M. Pullman, William B. Ogden, and others.

=== Chicago Republican Newspaper Company and Chicago Inter-Ocean Company ===
Jacob Bunn had also at one time been a founder, and the sole owner of the immense Chicago Republican Newspaper Company, which had been chartered by the state of Illinois in 1865, with an initial capitalization of $500,000. The Chicago Republican Newspaper Company, which constituted the institutional precursor of the Chicago Inter-Ocean, provided the corporate framework upon which the Inter-Ocean built. The Inter-Ocean Company achieved an average weekly circulation of 74,200 in 1877. The combined circulation of the Chicago Inter-Ocean Company represented, in 1877, the largest combined circulation of any newspaper in Chicago. The total annual circulation of the Chicago Inter-Ocean had achieved approximately eleven million by 1877.

=== J. Bunn Bank and debts resulting from 1878 bank failure ===
Jacob Bunn had established a private bank that was called the J. Bunn Bank of Springfield, Illinois. The J. Bunn Bank rapidly accumulated large capital assets during the nineteenth century, but due to what became an overextensive portfolio of real estate holdings during the Panic of 1873, the J. Bunn Bank was forced into liquidation. Jacob Bunn voluntarily effected the liquidation of the bank, and assumed liability for indebtedness that totaled approximately $800,000 in 1878. Jacob Bunn, who acted from deep convictions of honor, honesty, and loyalty, personally assumed liability for the amount of indebtedness that remained after the forced sale of the bank assets failed to produce capital adequate to full satisfaction of the $800,000 debt. The debts were reduced by forced sale of the assets of the J. Bunn Bank to an amount of $572,000. Consequently, Jacob Bunn, with the assistance of his brother John W. Bunn, and the later assistance of his children, other family members, and numerous close associates and friends, managed to satisfy the remaining 28.5 percent of the original indebtedness. Although Jacob Bunn died in 1897, his children, with the commitment to the fulfillment of their father's desire to repay the entire indebtedness, established a memorial trust that repaid, in 1925, the entire remaining portion of the original debt, a distribution that affected approximately 5,000 persons. The repayment was made with additional interest at the rate of 5 percent per annum.

=== Springfield Iron Company and Springfield Gas & Electric Company ===
John W. Bunn was a founder, director, and Vice President of the Springfield Iron Company, which was organized in 1871, had corporate offices in New York City, Chicago, St. Louis, and Springfield, Illinois, and at one point was one of the largest iron products manufacturers in the United States. Having established a deeply rooted continental presence in the railroad metal products industry, the Springfield Iron Company once was the largest manufacturer of angle splice bars in the United States. The Springfield Iron Company was absorbed in 1899 into the iron and steel corporate combine called Republic Iron & Steel Company, a corporation capitalized at $55 million in 1899. The financing of the Republic Iron & Steel Trust was provided by the Manhattan investment banking firms of William C. Sheldon & Co. and Dominick & Dickerman, the latter of which Watson Bradley Dickerman had served as both a founder and principal member. Watson Bradley Dickerman was a very close personal friend and business associate of both of the Bunn brothers. Dickerman served in 1890 and in 1891 as the President of the New York Stock Exchange, was a director of the Long Island Loan & Trust Company, and was president of the old Norfolk & Southern Railroad Company. Dickerman had begun his career in finance and banking as a young employee and trainee of Jacob Bunn, in the J. Bunn Bank of Springfield, Illinois. John W. Bunn served as director of the Springfield Gas & Electric Company in 1916.

== Extended family in business and industry ==
John Whitfield Bunn, Jacob Bunn, and the descendants, collateral, and marital relatives of the Bunn brothers represented a continental network of corporate, industrial, and financial entrepreneurship, executive leadership, and civic development. Several of the historically important familial associations of John and Jacob Bunn are provided below. Taken as a whole, these familial associations constituted a long-standing continuum of visionary business and civic work.

=== George Whitfield Bunn and California banking, Texas petroleum, and land development ===
George Whitfield Bunn, a brother of Jacob Bunn and John Whitfield Bunn, also born in Hunterdon County, New Jersey, became a pioneer banker and land developer in Marin County, California, during the nineteenth century, and once owned immense oil interests in Texas, including more than 10,000 acres (40 km^{2}) of property that later became a major oil field in Texas. George Whitfield Bunn served as an incorporator and director of the Bank of Tomales, California.

=== The New York City and Connecticut connections to finance and industry ===
In addition to having direct connection with the enormous body of civic and commercial associations held by his brother Jacob Bunn, John W. Bunn was connected indirectly to the Leonard Richardson and William Henry Barnum industrial dynasties of Connecticut and New York, through the marriage of a nephew, George Wallace Bunn Sr., who married Ada Willard Richardson. Ada Willard Richardson, the daughter-in-law of Jacob Bunn, and niece-in-law of John W. Bunn, was the daughter of renowned building contractor William Douglas Richardson. John Whitfield Bunn and William Douglas Richardson were associates in business, and both men served as founders and directors of the Springfield Iron Company, in August, 1871, a corporation that was capitalized initially at $200,000. The capital stock of the corporation was increased in 1874 to $400,000. Leonard Richardson served as president of the Iron Bank of Falls Village, Connecticut.

=== Barnum & Richardson Company of Connecticut and Chicago ===
William Douglas Richardson was a nephew of Leonard Richardson of Lime Rock, Connecticut. Leonard Richardson was a pioneer in the development of the iron products manufacturing industries of New England and Chicago, having served as a founder and owner of the immense railroad car wheel and iron products company known as the Barnum-Richardson Company of Chicago and Lime Rock, Connecticut. Milo Barnum Richardson, a son of Leonard Richardson, served as a director of the Barnum & Richardson Company along with other prominent Chicago industrialists, including John Crerar. Additionally, Milo B. Richardson served in close connection with Connecticut railroad financier Collis Potter Huntington in the establishment of the Ensign Manufacturing Company of Huntington, West Virginia. Milo Barnum Richardson, nephew of William Henry Barnum of Connecticut, President of the Barnum- Richardson Company, son of Leonard Richardson, and a first cousin of William Douglas Richardson and Ada Willard (Richardson) Bunn, served as a member of the Connecticut State Board of World's Fair Commissioners during the World's Columbian Exposition of 1893. William Douglas Richardson served on the personal staff of architect Daniel Burnham as the General Superintendent of Buildings at the 1893 World's Columbian Exposition at Chicago. Consequently, John Whitfield Bunn, William Douglas Richardson, and Milo Barnum Richardson, all of whom were related either by blood or through marriage, each contributed to the development of the iron products manufacturing industry of the United States, as well as to the leadership and execution of the 1893 World's Columbian Exposition (Chicago World's Fair). Jacob and John Whitfield Bunn, along with William Douglas Richardson, Benjamin Hamilton Ferguson, and others, constituted a cooperative association for investment, entrepreneurship, industrial expansion opportunity, and civic and charitable causes. Milo B. Richardson served on the board of directors of the Caledonian-American Life Insurance Company of New York City, which was organized in 1898. In harmony with the railroad products manufacturing, as well as the financial heritages of the Richardson family, Milo B. Richardson served as a director of the Rochester Car Wheel Works Company of New York, the Hartford & Connecticut Western Railroad Company, and the Falls Village Savings Bank.

=== Island Creek Coal Company ===
Elizabeth Jane Ferguson, the wife of Jacob Bunn and herself a prominent Illinois philanthropist, was related maternally to the Holden family of Cleveland, Ohio, which owned the Island Creek Coal Company, one of the most important and profitable coal corporations in the United States.

=== Henry Stryker Taylor and the Taylor-Stryker-Cunningham-Hart-Capps Lineage ===
Elizabeth Alice Bunn, a great-granddaughter of Jacob Bunn, married Illinois banker and financier Henry Stryker Taylor, who was one of the largest shareholders of the Pennsylvania Railroad Company (renowned financier Howard Butcher of Philadelphia was at one time also one of the largest individual shareholders of the Pennsylvania Railroad Company). Henry S. Taylor, the son of bank president and Illinois real estate magnate Robert Cunningham Taylor, had once run the 100-yard dash in 9.6 seconds, held numerous track records, and was captain of the track team at Knox College in Galesburg, Illinois, during his undergraduate years there. Robert Cunningham Taylor was president of a farm and land company, co-founder and president of the Peoples Bank of Virginia, Illinois, president of the Cass County Title & Trust Company, co-owner of the King & Taylor Company, a funeral home and furniture dealer, and a director of the Farmers National Bank of Virginia, Illinois. Robert Taylor, the father of Robert Cunningham Taylor, was a farmer, cattle dealer, grain merchant, and land entrepreneur, who served as vice president and director of the Farmers National Bank of Virginia, Illinois, as a Trustee of Virginia Township, an elder in the Presbyterian Church, and a local school board member. Robert Cunningham Taylor Jr., a Chicago banker and financier, the older brother of Henry S. Taylor, also a Knox College alumnus, went on to graduate from Harvard Business School in 1932. In addition to being the great-great-nephew of industrialist Dr. Peter I. Stryker, who served as Governor of New Jersey and as a New Jersey legislator, Henry S. Taylor was the grandson of lawyer Henry Stryker, III, who was of one of the founders and real estate developers of the Michigan summer resorts of the Little Traverse Bay region of Michigan. Henry S. Taylor was a descendant of numerous founding financial and industrial families of Massachusetts, Connecticut, Rhode Island, Vermont, and New York, and was a descendant of Mayflower passengers William Brewster, John Alden, and William Mullins.

H. S. Taylor was the great-great-grandson of Dr. David Gill McClure of Rutland, Vermont, who was a founder of Lansing, Michigan, and its business community. Henry Brigham McClure, an Illinois judge, college founder, and capitalist who was the maternal great-grandfather of Henry Stryker Taylor, had served in the law partnership of Yates, Brown & McClure with Richard Yates, a Governor of Illinois during the Civil War.

Henry S. Taylor was a descendant of the Henshaw family of Connecticut, Illinois, and California, whose business interests included international shipping, shipbuilding, electric power generation, water rights acquisition and development in California, and multinational banking. Henry S. Taylor was the descendant of one branch of the Henshaw family, and was a third cousin of California banker and financier William Griffith Henshaw (1860–1924), who, along with his family, was a primary owner and developer of some of the largest water reservoirs and commercial water courses in California, and who promoted and helped build (having served on the board of directors) the International Banking Corporation, a major and early corporate precursor to Citigroup.

Henry Stryker Taylor was the first cousin of Capt. Joseph H. Hart, one of the top ace pilots of Pan American Airlines, and who had flown more than 2.5 million miles prior to dying in a fatal airline crash in the 1950s. John Hart, brother of Joseph Hart, and also a first cousin to Henry Stryker Taylor, was an international businessman involved in South American trade with the United States. Captain Joseph H. Hart was an expert pilot of the Pan Am Clippers, and was renowned for his knowledge and expertise with respect to this particular aircraft.

Henry Stryker Taylor was the cousin of the owners of the J. Capps & Son Company of Jacksonville, Illinois, which manufactured clothing and other textiles, achieving sales of $1 million annually by 1901, and employing around 500 people by 1901. William Thomas Capps Sr., the uncle of Henry S. Taylor, was a founder of the Midland Life Insurance Company of Chicago. Henry Taylor was the first cousin of Henry McClure Capps, prominent Hollywood art director, husband of Ruth Goldwyn, and son-in-law of renowned producer Samuel Goldwyn.

Henry Stryker Taylor was the father-in-law of Thomas Keister Greer, Esq., a renowned corporate lawyer and trial lawyer of Virginia and California, who either represented or helped to build several of the largest land companies in United States history, and who became one of the foremost riparian rights lawyers in the United States, serving variously as junior general counsel to Miller & Lux Company of San Francisco, and as general counsel to Salyer Land Company of California, and to Crockett & Gambogey Company of California. Henry S. Taylor was a cousin, through maternal lineage, of Oliver Hazard Payne, the Cleveland financier who helped to organize the American Tobacco Company, and the United States Steel Company, and who was a partner of tobacco industrialists and university founders James Buchanan Duke and Benjamin Newton Duke.

=== Charles Cunningham, Esq. ===
Charles Cunningham, Esq., the paternal great-uncle of Henry Stryker Taylor, was a native of Scotland, served as the British Consul (and earlier as Vice Consul) to Russia, and was instrumental in the establishment of the Danube River Commission system of tariffs and trade structures, serving as one of the founders of the Danube River Commission, and as an originator of the concept for the commission. Cunningham had also engaged in the mercantile business in Smyrna (now İzmir), Turkey.

=== John Stryker ===
Furthermore, lawyer Jon Stryker of Rome, New York, who was a maternal first cousin of Henry Stryker Taylor, established and owned the Michigan Southern Railroad Company, was one of the principal founders of the New York Central Railroad, and established, controlled, and presided over numerous extensive manufacturing concerns in the State of New York. The Michigan Southern Railroad system was capitalized at $200 million in 1914–1915.

=== William Beaumont Whitney of Philadelphia ===
Philadelphia industrialist William Beaumont Whitney, a maternal first cousin of Henry Stryker Taylor, had founded and owned, with Mahlon S. Kemmerer, the immense Whitney & Kemmerer Coal Company of Philadelphia, and had served on the board of directors of the Girard National Bank of Philadelphia. Whitney served as a vice president of the Law and Order Society of Philadelphia, was an annual member of the Archaeological Institute of America, and was a director of the Penn Mutual Insurance Company of Philadelphia. The Penn Mutual Insurance Company had achieved, by 1897, $147,973,567 of insurance in force, with 59,411 policies in force by 1897. Whitney also served as president of the Theodore Starr Savings Bank of Philadelphia, as president of the Quaker City Electric Company of Philadelphia, and as director of the Gondolo Tannin Company of Philadelphia. Whitney served as coal department manager of the Lehigh Coal & Navigation Company from 1864 until 1870, as treasurer of the Whitehall Portland Cement Company, as treasurer of the Connellsville Coke and Iron Company, as treasurer of the Bishop White Prayer-Book Society, and as accounting warden of the Church of the Crucifixion for thirty-five years. Whitney was also a director of the Stonega Coal & Coke Company. The Stonega Coal & Coke Company, capitalized at $2 million in 1903, owned two plants that had consisted of 666 ovens, and 500 ovens, respectively. Whitney was a Fellow of the American Geographical Society.

=== A. G. Edwards and Edwards family of Illinois and St. Louis ===
Benjamin Hamilton Ferguson, the brother of Elizabeth Jane (Ferguson) Bunn, married Alice Edwards, who was both the daughter of Judge Benjamin Stephenson Edwards, and the niece of Albert Gallatin Edwards (the founder of A. G. Edwards Co.).

=== Joseph Wellington Willard and the explosives industry ===
Joseph Wellington Willard, a first cousin of Ada (Richardson) Bunn, was an inventor and manufacturer of explosives, and assisted Lammot du Pont in the establishment of the Repauno Chemical Company near Philadelphia, Pennsylvania.

=== Extended family involvement with New York and California banking ===
Interconnected with the Bunn family had been, through marriage and collateral relation, Robert Burns Motherwell, II, who was once Chairman of Wells Fargo, and Charles Stillman, who had once been the controlling force behind National City Bank of New York, later known as CitiGroup. Robert Burns Motherwell, II, married into the Hogan family (see below), and became the father of renowned American New York Expressionist School artist Robert Burns Motherwell, III.

=== The Hogan-Regan dynasty and international law, petroleum, and precious metals mining industries ===
Willard Bunn Sr., a grandson of Jacob Bunn, and great-nephew of John W. Bunn, married Ruth Regan of Chippewa Falls, Wisconsin. Ruth Regan was a graduate of the Chicago Musical College, was a church and school founder, and promoter of musical education. Ruth Regan was the sister of lawyer Mary Regan (who changed her surname to "Rehan"). Mary Rehan began her career as an actress on Broadway, later attending law school in New York City. Miss Rehan, a native of Chippewa Falls, maintained a law office at 230 East 71st Street in New York. She specialized in tariff law, and was reputedly the first woman admitted to practice before the United States Customs Court. Mary Rehan was a former chairman of the jury award of the American Women's Association, and was a principal founder and patron of the International Bar Association. Mary Rehan gave up acting for law during the nineteen-twenties and received an LL.B. degree from the Brooklyn Law School in 1927. During her first 10 years of practice she was with the New York firm of Barnes, Chilvers & Halstead. In 1937 she founded a firm there and later opened a Washington branch. Mary Rehan had been a founder, secretary, and treasurer of the Museum of Costume Art, which she helped found in 1937. She was a director of the Costume Institute of the New York Metropolitan Museum of Art and an honorary life fellow of the museum. Miss Rehan had been a director of the Women's National Republican Club. She supported Franklin D. Roosevelt for the Presidency in 1932, but in 1936, when he sought a second term, she helped organize and became national treasurer of the Independent Coalition of American Women, an anti-New Deal group. In 1954 she received the New York State Citation of Merit.

Robert Giles Regan, brother of Mary and Ruth Regan, was the founder and president of the R. G. Regan Construction Company of Chicago. R. G. Regan served as the building contractor for the Motorola Corporation plant in Chicago, the Petralager Building of Chicago, and the Tropic-Aire plant of Chicago, and served as the chief executive of the Chatham Housing Project in the South Side of Chicago. R. G. Regan also served as contractor for either remodeling or physical additions to the Higginbotham building of Joliet, Illinois, the Kennedy-Cochran building at Hillside, Illinois, the Silver Cross Hospital, the Munroe Hatchery, the Tractor-Motive Corporation building at Deerfield, Illinois, the Public Service garages and offices at Joliet, and the Atlas Wallpaper Company at Coal City, Illinois.

Ruth and Mary Regan were first cousins of lawyer Thomas Stephen Hogan, who was a discoverer and developer of the Permian Oil Basin of Western Texas, a Montana State Senator, and Secretary of State of Montana. T. S. Hogan built the first skyscraper of Midland, Texas, in 1929, known as the Petroleum Tower, and served as a catalyst of the West Texas oil industry when he sold the 74,000-acre (300 km^{2}) John T. McElroy Ranch to the Franco-Wyoming Company for $3 million. T. S. Hogan operated mines in Mexico, Montana, and Idaho. Additionally, T. S. Hogan conducted, operated, and owned oil exploration and production enterprises in Oklahoma, Indiana, Montana, Illinois, Colorado, Wyoming, Texas, and Mexico. Hogan served as the founder of the Federal Farm Loan Bank System during the Great Depression, as Assistant Solicitor of the U.S. Department of the Interior, as President of the National Coal Labor Board, as President of the largest labor organization in Montana by the age of 22, and as President of the Beet Growers' Association of the United States. T. S. Hogan also served as Chairman of the Denver Coal District Board (Colorado). Patrick Hogan, also a first cousin of Ruth (Regan) Bunn and Mary Rehan, was one of the foremost lumber producers of Washington State, and helped to shape the Pacific lumber industry. Another first cousin of Ruth (Regan) Bunn and Mary Rehan was lawyer John Carol Hogan, a graduate of the University of Wisconsin (Madison), who contributed to the formation of the jurisprudence of the lumber industry, represented many lumber corporations, and served in the Washington State legislature. John Carol Hogan held the long-distance runner championship at the University of Wisconsin. John C. Hogan had also established the Chippewa Bulletin newspaper in Chippewa Falls, Wisconsin, prior to leaving for Washington State. William Hogan, another first cousin of Mary Rehan and Ruth (Regan) Bunn, was the President of the Oro Grande Gold Mining Company of Idaho, a prospecting enterprise that was capitalized at $1.5 million in 1922. Thomas Stephen Hogan, Patrick Hogan, John Carol Hogan, and William Hogan were all brothers, and first cousins of Ruth and Mary Regan. Fred T. Hogan, the son of Thomas Stephen Hogan, was a trucking/shipping entrepreneur, co-founder of the Hogan & Choate Oil Company, served as the mayor of Midland, Texas, and was inducted, along with his father, T. S. Hogan, into the Petroleum Hall of Fame.

== Republican politics, civic philanthropy, and civic vision ==
John W. Bunn also demonstrated strong interest in the Illinois judiciary of his time, and served as a Delegate, representing Sangamon County, to the Illinois Judicial Convention of 1888. In 1874, the Springfield Republican City Convention nominated John W. Bunn for the office of Mayor of Springfield, although he soon afterwards declined the nomination. John W. Bunn was a close friend of and supporter of Illinois statesman Shelby Moore Cullom. When Shelby M. Cullom served as Governor of Illinois, Cullom relied heavily on the counsel and influence of John W. Bunn and Chicago lawyer Milton Hay, among others. During the tenure of his association with the Illinois Republican State Central Committee, Bunn served as its Chairman on at least one occasion. John W. Bunn was an active participant in Republican Party politics at both the state and national levels, and served as an active member of the Illinois Republican State Committee from 1872 until 1876, and again in such a capacity from 1900 until 1902. John W. Bunn was a member, along with James R. B Van Cleeve and Floyd K. Whittemore, of the Monument Committee of the Governor John R. Tanner Monument Association, whose purpose was to coordinate and execute the plans to erect a monument commemorating the legacy of John R. Tanner, who had served as governor of Illinois. Of special importance is the fact that John W. Bunn served as a primary financial contributor to the presidential campaign of Abraham Lincoln.

=== John Whitfield Bunn, public works, and significant civic associations and contributions ===
John W. Bunn made significant contributions to the coordination of, and corporate infrastructure of, the 1893 World Columbian Exposition (World's Fair of 1893) in Chicago, Illinois, by having served as a member of the Illinois Board of World's Fair Commissioners, and through having acted also as the Treasurer of the Illinois Board of World's Fair Commissioners. John W. Bunn was a member of the board of directors of the Illinois Centennial Commission of 1918, whose corporate purpose was the coordination and execution of ceremonial commemoration of the statehood of Illinois, which had been achieved on December 3, 1818. John W. Bunn served as a vice president, director, Executive Committee member, and founder of the Abraham Lincoln Centennial Association (See: Abraham Lincoln Association), having established the Lincoln Centennial Association along with Melville Weston Fuller (a Chicago jurist who served as United States Supreme Court Chief Justice), Shelby Moore Cullom, Adlai E. Stevenson, Richard Yates, Melville E. Stone, Albert J. Hopkins, J. Otis Humphrey, Charles S. Deneen, John P. Hand, James A. Rose, Ben. F. Caldwell, Dr. William Jayne, and Horace White. The specific and express object of the Lincoln Centennial Association was: "To properly observe the one hundredth anniversary of the birth of Abraham Lincoln; to preserve to posterity the memory of his words and works, and to stimulate the patriotism of the youth of the land by appropriate annual exercises." John W. Bunn was active in Chicago and Springfield social, political, and commercial circles as a member of the Union League Club of Chicago, as well as the Chicago Club, and the Illini Country Club and Sangamo Club, both of Springfield, Illinois. Illinois Governor Richard Yates appointed John W. Bunn as a Delegate, representing Chicago, to the National Conference on Taxation held at Buffalo, New York, in May, 1901. John Whitfield Bunn was a member of the distinguished Saddle and Sirloin Club of Chicago. During the Civil War, John W. Bunn served as a special messenger and coordinator for the mobilization and transfer of Union Army soldiers from Chicago to Cairo, Illinois. John W. Bunn also served as a member of the Richard Oglesby Monument Association. Jacob Bunn and Elizabeth (Ferguson) Bunn had helped to establish the Springfield Home for the Friendless, an orphanage home for widows and orphans during the Civil War, and the Bettie Stuart Institute, a Springfield academy for girls.

=== City of Springfield, Illinois ===
With a reputation for being a financial counselor and manager, John W. Bunn served as Treasurer of the City of Springfield, Illinois, from 1857 until 1859.

=== Illinois Board of Agriculture ===
John W. Bunn served as Treasurer of the Illinois State Board of Agriculture from 1858 until 1898. Bunn provided financial assistance to the Illinois State Fair Association when he personally advanced $15,000 to the Association for the purpose of enabling the liquidation of the debts that the Association possessed at a particular time in 1887.

=== Illinois Pension Agency ===
During the American Civil War period lasting from 1861 until 1865, John W. Bunn was appointed by Abraham Lincoln to serve as Pension Agent for the State of Illinois.

=== University of Illinois ===
Having always taken a strong interest in the welfare and promotion of education, John W. Bunn served as the founding Treasurer of the University of Illinois, having acted as Treasurer of the University of Illinois from its institutional commencement in 1868, until 1893.

=== Chicago Historical Society, waterways development ===
Additionally, John Bunn was an active member of the Chicago Historical Society.

John W. Bunn assisted with causes connected to the development of waterway infrastructure between The Great Lakes and the Gulf of Mexico. In 1909, Bunn was appointed, in addition to several other men, by the Governor of Illinois as Delegate to the Water Ways Convention held at New Orleans, Louisiana.

=== United States Centennial International Exposition at Philadelphia ===
John W. Bunn was an incorporator of the United States Centennial Commission of 1876, the corporate body that organized and carried out the United States Centennial International Exhibition of 1876, at Philadelphia, Pennsylvania. Along with Illinois delegates and incorporators Norman B. Judd, William B. Ogden, John Williams, William F. Coolbaugh, J. M. Adsit, H. O. Armour, D. J. Ely, George Bruner, Charles Fisher, John C. Proctor, and L. C. Bull, John W. Bunn served as incorporator of the $10 million corporation that provided the financial and directorial structure of the 1876 United States Centennial Exhibition. Additionally, Bunn served as a founder and member of the board of directors of the Lincoln Library of Springfield, Illinois. John Bunn, a lifelong bachelor, died on June 7, 1920, in Springfield, Illinois.
