= Railroad chronometer =

Timepiece used in operation of trains

A railroad chronometer or railroad standard watch is a specialized timepiece that once was crucial for safe and correct operation of trains in many countries. A system of timetable and train order, which relied on highly accurate timekeeping, was used to ensure that two trains could not be on the same stretch of track at the same time.

== Overview ==
Regulations of the watches used by critical personnel on the railroads (engineer, conductor, switch yard controllers, etc.) were specified almost from the beginning of widespread railroad use in the 1850s and 1860s. These regulations became more widespread and more specific as time went on, with some watches that were "railroad standard" at an earlier time eventually becoming obsolete as technology improved. There was, however, no absolute, universal definition used across different railroad lines. Each company appointed one or more "time inspectors" (typically a watchmaker) who decided which watches were acceptable for use. In the United States, the American Railway Association held a meeting in 1887, which resulted a fairly standardized set of requirements, but not all railroads adopted them.

== Webb C. Ball ==
One notable watch inspector was Webb C. Ball. His first job as a time inspector was when he was brought in by the Lake Shore and Michigan Southern Railways in 1891 after a crash and was tasked with bringing their time inspection standards up to industry normals. Ball's career eventually led to his being the time inspector on more than half the United States' railways, leading to a far more uniform set of standards in the U.S.

== Typical requirements ==
A typical railroad's requirements for a watch in the early 20th century might include:

- only American-made watches and certain approved Swiss watches may be used (depending on availability of spare parts)
- only open-faced dials, with the stem at 12 o'clock post 1908
- minimum of 15 functional jewels in the movement (pre-1895), changed to 17 jewels post 1895
- 16 or 18-size only
- maximum variation of 30 seconds (approximately 4 seconds daily) per weekly check
- watch adjusted to at least three positions (pre-1895), later changed to five positions: Face up and face down (the positions a watch might commonly take when laid on a flat surface); then crown up, crown pointing left, and crown pointing right (the positions a watch might commonly take in a pocket). Occasionally a sixth position, crown pointing down, would be included.
- adjusted for severe temperature variance and isochronism (variance in spring tension)
- indication of time with bold legible Roman numerals or Arabic numerals, Arabic numerals only post 1906, outer minute division, second dial, heavy hands,
- lever used to set the time (no risk of inadvertently setting the watch to an erroneous time, when winding the watch with the stem) post 1908. Pendent set watches were grandfathered.
- Breguet balance spring
- micrometer adjustment regulator
- single roller escapement (pre-1908), double roller escapement
- steel escape wheel
- anti-magnetic protection (after the advent of diesel-electric locomotives)

The minimum requirements were raised several times as watch-making technology progressed, and the watch companies produced newer, even more reliable models. By World War II, many railroads required watches that were of a much higher grade than those made to comply with the original 1891 standard.

== Manufacturers ==
The Waltham Watch Company and the Elgin Watch Company were both used as early as the 1860s and 1870s as railroad standard watches. Later, Hamilton Watch Company, Illinois Watch Company and many of the other American watch manufacturers all produced railroad-grade watches like the Ball Watch Company.

The Time Signal Service of the United States Naval Observatory was used to ensure accuracy of railroad chronometers and schedule American rail transport.

== See also ==
- Pocket watch
- Railway time
- Railway signalling
