= Benrus =

American watch company

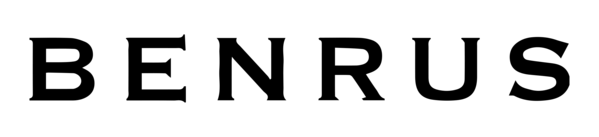
- Company type: Private
- Industry: Watchmaking
- Founded: 1921, New York, United States of America
- Founder: Lazrus brothers
- Headquarters: United States of America
- Area served: Worldwide
- Website: benrus.com

Benrus is an American watchmaking and lifestyle company founded as a watch repair shop in New York City in 1921 by Romanian-American Benjamin Lazrus and his two brothers. Benrus watches were worn for decades by the U.S. military from World War II through Vietnam.

== History ==
The name "Benrus" is a portmanteau of the name of cofounder Benjamin Lazrus.

In the 1920s the company transitioned from watch repair to the manufacture of watchcases and assembly of completed watches using imported internal components from La Chaux-de-Fonds, Switzerland. During World War II, the company stopped manufacturing watches and switched to the manufacture of timing systems (e.g. fuses) used in munitions. In the 1940s and 1950s, Benrus released the Sky Chief (a chronograph), the Dial-a-Rama, the Wrist Alarm and a bracelet watch called Embraceable.

In the early 1950s, Benrus failed in a hostile takeover of Hamilton, and subsequently lost a legal battle with Hamilton in which Benrus had acquired Hamilton stock for the stated purpose of investment but for the actual purpose of control. The decision in this case has become a part of the United States Department of Justice Antitrust Manual with regard to the establishment of preliminary injunctions in antitrust cases.

In the 1960s, the company introduced self-winding watches and entered into the automobile market with steering wheel-mounted self-winding clocks. Also in this decade, Jerry Lewis was hired as a pitchman for the company's Belforte brand.

In the early 1960s, the Federal Trade Commission determined that Benrus' marketing practices—specifically, its published list prices—were misleading for a substantial minority (about 14%) of potential customers at the time.

The company was sold to Victor Kiam, later of Remington Razors, in 1967. Over the next ten years, the company suffered in competition against inexpensive Japanese wristwatches, adopting a strategy of diversification into military timepieces and costume jewelry. Nonetheless, Benrus filed for bankruptcy in 1977. (Note: There is an 8-K filing related to the bankruptcy filing, as noted at https://www.sec.gov/news/digest/1977/dig091977.pdf (top of page 4)) The company emerged from this after a reorganization which involved entering into a joint venture agreement with the Wells and Roka Watch Company. Thereafter, the company marketed watches under the two tradenames of Benrus and Sovereign, contingent on royalty payments through the joint venture. Benrus filed for bankruptcy once more in 1981, due to defaulting of its royalty payments. By 1984, the company had taken on the name Wells-Benrus Corp. and was operating under a bankruptcy agreement where the company owed $12 million to Victor Kiam and sought to borrow additional funds to maintain operations. The Wells-Benrus company was based in Middlebury, Connecticut.

Hampden Watch of Chicago acquired the Benrus brand from the Wells-Benrus company in 1981, which renamed the business Benrus Watch Company. Irving Wein, the owner, brought Benrus distribution to large catalogs and retailers such as Walmart, Kmart, Sears, and JCPenney. The Benrus brand thrived during the 1980s and 1990s until it was sold to M.Z. Berger, a watch importer which had previously acquired the Elgin, Waltham, and Gruen brands.

== Notable campaigns ==
- In 1926, the company's marketing campaign revolved around Charles Lindbergh who, at the time, was one of the world's biggest celebrities
- Benrus developed the "sports aviation" watch model promoted by Babe Ruth
- In 2015, Benrus hired Camille Kostek to become its brand ambassador in their transition into becoming a full-fledged lifestyle company

== Legal ==
=== Trademark ===
According to the United States Patent and Trademark Office, Benrus is owned by Benrus Holdings, LLC A luxury wristwatch company, released two watches, N°1 and Philo. In 2014, Giovanni Feroce acquired the license and trademarks for Benrus with the intention of transforming Benrus into a lifestyle brand with wristwatches as the core element. In 2017, Feroce lost control of the trademarks when he failed to make payments to the previous owners.

The new ownership group of the Benrus trademarks was granted a temporary restraining order by Superior Court Judge Michael Silverstein barring any interference with the brand from Feroce's former company. According to court documents, Feroce and his entity are "temporarily restrained from utilizing, advertising, selling, marketing, disposing, transferring and encumbering any goods bearing the Mark (Benrus) and/or related Intellectual Property." Feroce and his entity are blocked from the usage of the benrus.com URL. A receiver was appointed by the court to liquidate the assets of the former business with numerous creditors seeking payment. In 2018, the Buffalo Bills sued Benrus and Feroce for breach of contract, alleging nonpayment of $1M from a sponsorship agreement.

== See also ==
- Elgin Watch Company
- Gruen Watch Co.
- Hamilton Watch Company
- Illinois Watch Company
- Waltham Watch Company
- Wittnauer
- US military watches
