= Hamilton Watch Complex =

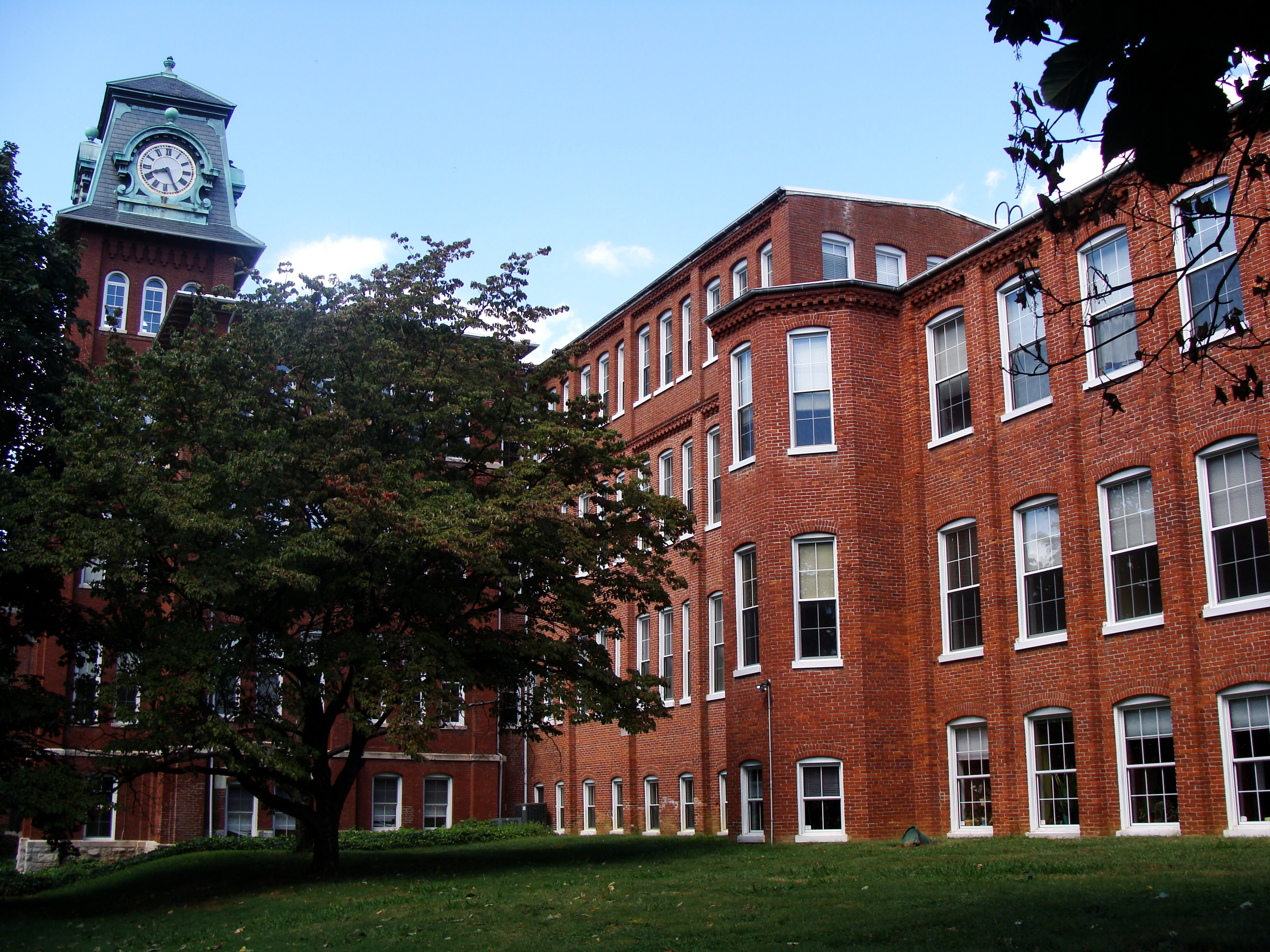
- Interactive map of the Hamilton Watch Complex area

General information
- Architectural style: Art Deco, International style, Second Empire
- Location: 901 Columbia Avenue; Lancaster, Pennsylvania; United States
- Coordinates: 40°2′21″N 76°19′29″W
- Construction started: September 1874
- Completed: 1963
- Renovated: 1983–2003

Height
- Height: 90 feet (27 m)

Design and construction
- Architect: Clarence Luther Stiles
- Lancaster Watch Company
- U.S. National Register of Historic Places
- U.S. Historic district – Contributing property
- Part of: Lancaster City Historic District (ID0100956)
- NRHP reference No.: 82003793

Significant dates
- Added to NRHP: August 14, 1982
- Designated CP: September 7, 2001

The Hamilton Watch Complex is a former industrial complex in Lancaster, Pennsylvania. It was owned by the Hamilton Watch Company and was used as their headquarters from its founding in 1892 until 1980. The complex was listed on the National Register of Historic Places in 1982. The main building was converted into a luxury apartment and condominium complex, while the Administrative Offices are now home to a Montessori school called "New School Montessori."

== Design ==
The complex is located on the western edge of Lancaster on Pennsylvania Route 462 (Columbia Avenue). The twin 90-foot (27 m) clock towers are the most dominant feature of the building. Each tower is topped with a mansard roof trimmed with copper and a clock with four faces. The four-story complex was built out of brick and is shaped roughly like an 'E' with the central portion of a building situated east and west, paralleling Columbia Avenue, and three wings extending north. An unconnected, four-story, Art Deco office building stands south of the main building, between the two clock towers. The westernmost wing of the complex was designed in a "restrained" International style.

== History ==
The Adams and Perry Watch Manufacturing Company was formed in September 1874 and started construction on the original building in the complex, which was completed in July 1875. The building, designed by Chicago-architect Clarence Luther Stiles in the Second Empire style, was three stories high and consisted of only the eastern tower, flanked on either side with a wing. The company went bankrupt in 1876, and after several years of attempts to organize a new company, the Keystone Standard Watch Company was started in 1886. Keystone Standard Watch went bankrupt, as well, in 1890. Its assets were sold in 1892 in a public auction to a group of investors from Lancaster, who had also bought another bankrupt watch company in Aurora, Illinois. They founded the Hamilton Watch Company on December 14, 1892.

In 1902, the western wing was extended, and a fourth floor was added to the entire building, as well as an extension of the clock tower and modification of its mansard roof in 1905. The complex was repeatedly expanded in the early 1910s, ending in 1916 with the construction of the second clock tower. An addition was constructed in 1923 on the eastern end of the building. An extension was built, extending north from the western clock tower, in 1925 to 1926, and another, extending west from the same tower, in 1929. Various landscaping projects were also undertaken during the 1920s. A new factory wing was constructed in 1936 behind the original 1874 clock tower. The four-story office building between the two clock towers was built in 1941, along with another wing extending north from the end of the 1929 addition. The final addition of the complex was completed in 1963, with the construction of another wing adjacent to the 1941 wing.

=== Renovation ===
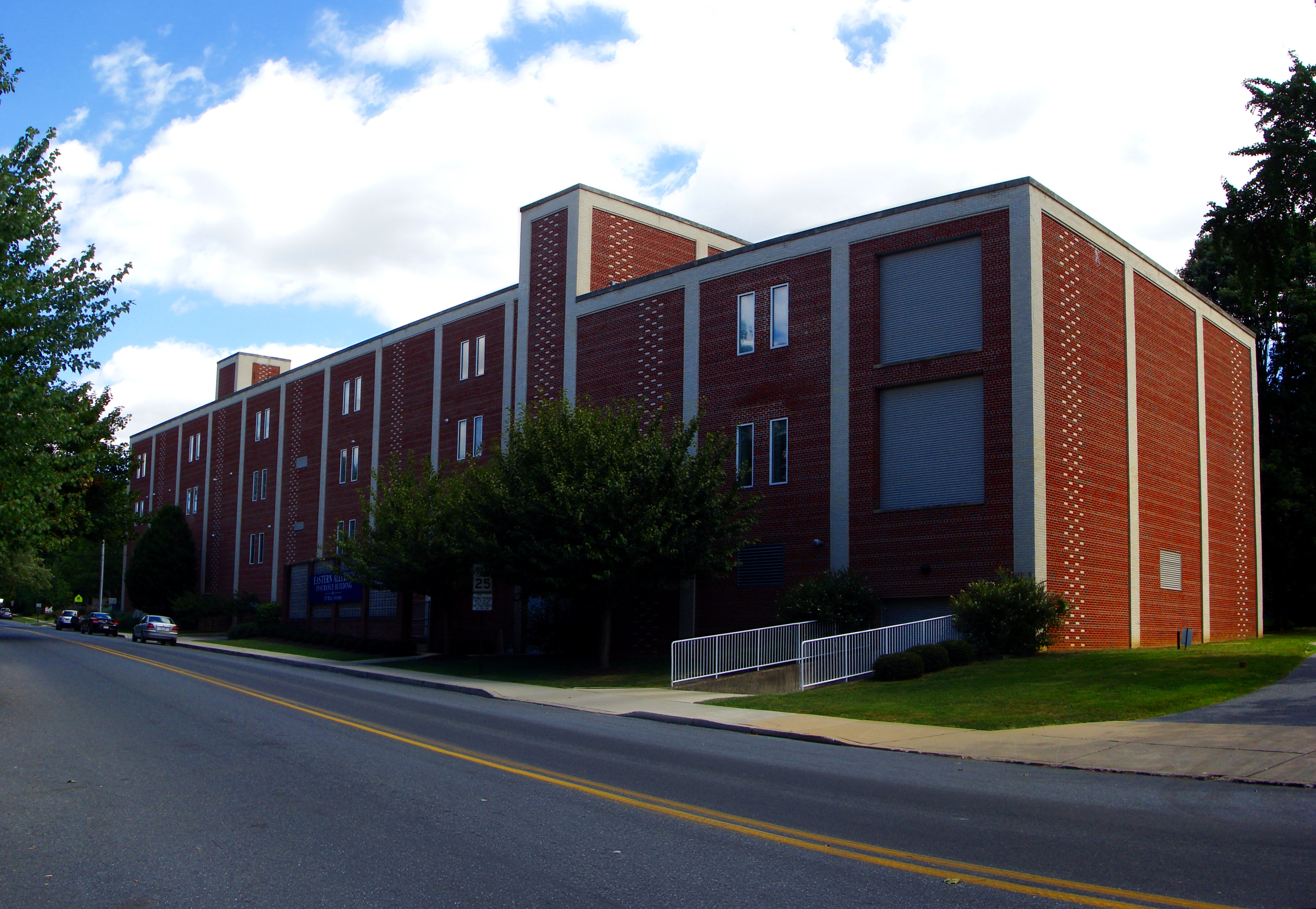
The wing that was built in 1963.

In 1980, the Hamilton Watch Company was renamed Hamilton Technology and was moved out of the complex into downtown Lancaster. A proposal was put forth in 1981 by a Philadelphia-based real estate developer to convert the complex into 202 apartments and 61 townhouses, but it fell through; its failure being blamed on "high interest rates and restrictive zoning regulations". Another developer bought the site in 1983. However, that project was halted in 1984 by a "legal dispute", leaving 78 units unfinished and dozens more only partially completed. A Montessori school, formerly called "The New School Of Lancaster" now called "New Schooler Montessori" was opened in the 1941 office building in the autumn of 1995. The complex was sold to a Baltimore-based developer in 1998 with plans to convert the existing apartments into luxury apartments and condominiums for $8 million. The final phase of the renovations of the main building was completed in July 2000; a total of 135 condos were constructed in the building. The 1941 and 1963 wings were sold to the city in 1999; after a $4.5 renovation, the wings were leased to an insurance company in 2003. The complex was listed on the National Register of Historic Places on August 14, 1982, and was designated a contributing property to the Lancaster City Historic District on September 7, 2001.

== See also ==
- National Register of Historic Places listings in Lancaster, Pennsylvania

== Sources ==
- Alexander, Larry (January 31, 2003). "Former Hamilton Watch factory restored, reused; Insurance firm is first tenant in city space". Intelligencer Journal. Lancaster, Pennsylvania. pp. B1–B2.
- Bowman, John J (1945). "Lancaster's Part in the World's Watchmaking Industry". Papers Read Before the Lancaster County Historical Society. XLIX (2). Lancaster, Pennsylvania: Lancaster County Historical Society.
- Harris, Bernard; Mekeel, Tim (November 7, 1998). "$8 million plan to finish Clock Towers luxury apts. [sic]". Lancaster New Era. pp. A1, A4.
- Mekeel, Tim (November 28, 1998). "A tall order; Daring Huntingdon Valley firm restoring 90-foot-high Clock Towers". Lancaster New Era. pp. A1, A8.
- Snyder, John J (May 1982). "Lancaster Watch Company". National Register of Historic Places Registration: Pennsylvania SP Lancaster Watch Company. National Archives and Records Administration.
- Wallace, Brian (October 18, 1995). "Cleanup of pollution at apartments set to begin". Intelligencer Journal. Lancaster, Pennsylvania. pp. B1–B2.
