= Illinois Watch Company =

Defunct American watch manufacturer

- Founded: 1870, Springfield, Illinois
- Founders: John C. Adams and John Whitfield Bunn
- Headquarters: Springfield, Illinois, United States

The Illinois Watch Company was founded on December 23, 1870, in Springfield, Illinois, by John C. Adams, John Whitfield Bunn (1831–1920), and various additional financiers. Twenty years later, Jacob Bunn Jr., (1864–1926) took over and ran the company until his death in 1926. The Bunn family surname was used in their most famous railroad watch, the Illinois "Bunn Special".

The company was sold to Hamilton Watch Company in 1927 and ceased to manufacture watches in the USA in the mid 1930s.

The Illinois Watch Company was reestablished in 2009 in Quincy, Illinois, and are currently servicing vintage Illinois watches as well as producing new watches, the first of which was assembled at the Quincy facility in 2020.

== History ==
The history of the Illinois Watch Company contains three distinct institutional chapters:

=== The Springfield Watch Company ===
The corporation was established as the Springfield Watch Company by John C. Adams of Massachusetts, and John Todd Stuart, William B. Miller, Dr. George Pasfield, John Whitfield Bunn, John Williams, and George N. Black, all of Springfield, Sangamon County, Illinois. John Todd Stuart served as the first President of the new corporation, which had been capitalized initially at $100,000.00. William B. Miller served as the first Secretary. The other named men constituted the original Board of Directors of the Springfield Watch Company. In 1873, the corporation established a corporate office in New York City. By the end of the year 1872, the corporation had sold approximately 10,000 watch movements.

=== The Illinois Springfield Watch Company ===
The Springfield Watch Company encountered severe financial difficulty during its institutional infancy. Consequently, the corporation had to undergo reorganization in 1877. In July, 1877, the corporation changed its name to the "Illinois Springfield Watch Company." Erastus Newton Bates, the second President of the corporation, assumed the chief executive leadership of the newly reorganized concern until July, 1878. The corporation again faced severe financial crisis, and had to be reorganized.

=== The Illinois Watch Company ===
The Illinois Springfield Watch Company was reorganized in the fall and winter of 1878, and was renamed the "Illinois Watch Company" (the final name of the corporation). Chief executive leadership of the corporation was assumed by Jacob Bunn Sr. (1814–1897), an Illinois industrialist, railroad financier, railroad reorganizer, wholesale grocer, commission merchant, newspaper publisher, land developer, coal operator, political advisor and financier, banker, and rope manufacturer. Jacob Bunn was the older brother of John Whitfield Bunn, and both men were among the closest friends and political allies of Illinois lawyer and statesman Abraham Lincoln, whose political career was largely financed and managed by the Bunn brothers. Jacob Bunn Sr., oversaw the steady growth of the new corporation, and under his administration the corporate employment grew from 260 in the year 1879 to 400 in the year 1880. Jacob Bunn led corporate sales along a certain and definite trajectory of growth in both volume of manufacture and corporate revenue. In 1879, the corporation manufactured 33,285 watch movements. In 1880, the corporation manufactured 47,065 watch movements. By 1890 the concern had established corporate offices in Chicago, New York City, and San Francisco. The corporation helped pioneer the logistical technology that served the enforcement of standard time for railroads throughout the world. At its apex of profitability, the Illinois Watch Company employed approximately 1,200 people.

== Management ==
Principal Corporate Governance of the Illinois Watch Company:

1. Jacob Bunn (1814–1897): President, reorganizer, Director, Chairman.
2. John Whitfield Bunn (1831–1920): Vice-President, Director.
3. Charles Smorowski: Secretary of the corporation.
4. Jacob Bunn Jr. (1864–1926): Vice-President, President, Director, Chairman.
5. Henry Bunn: Vice President, President, Director, Chairman.
6. Benjamin Hamilton Feguson: Director, Vice-Chairman, Chairman.
7. Frederic W. Morgan: General Cashier, Credit Manager.
8. Julius Armbruster: General Salesman.

The passing of Jacob Bunn Jr. threw Illinois Watch into disarray. In 1928, for a sum in excess of $5,000,000.00, the Illinois Watch Company was purchased by the Hamilton Watch Company of Lancaster, Pennsylvania, which continued to operate the factory under the Illinois name and shifted the emphasis from pocket to wrist watch production. By 1932, the Great Depression forced Hamilton to close the Illinois factory, though they retained possession of the name for many years.

== Wristwatches ==
Illinois Watch Company had four basic "periods" of wrist watch production. The first period was from the 1910s to the early 1920s, during which most wrist watches were converted pocketwatch movements. Gent's military and military-style specimens were made, often featuring porcelain dials.

The second period—from the early to mid-1920s—included movements and dials which were sold to be cased by individual jewelers. These were mostly small 6/0-size movements with 6:00 or 9:00 subsidiary seconds. Some were also cased at the factory using generic cases from a variety of sources. Some of the better-known models from that latter category include the Square, Canby, Square Cut Corner, Cushion, and Whippet. Also, larger 3/0-size movements were cased at the factory in this way—the Champion, Special, Ace/Maxine, and Atlantic, for example.

In the late 1920s, shortly before the Hamilton Watch Company took over, Illinois began commissioning its own unique wrist watch cases. The company cased and boxed its watches at the factory, marking the beginning of what many collectors consider the company's golden era, during which the finest watches were made. Models include the Picadilly, Major, Marquis, Chieftain, Ritz, New Yorker and Manhattan (the New Yorker came with a leather strap, the Manhattan with a metal one), Jolly Roger, Viking, Wembley/Medalist, Speedway, Guardsman, Trophy/Westchester, the Beau series (Beau Monde, Beau Geste, Beau Brummel, and Beau Royale), the Mate, and the top-of-the-line 14-karat solid gold Consul. Many collectors consider The Consul to be the finest American wrist watch ever made—examples with original silver pinstripe dials, starburst dials, and with a small second hand are especially desired. Some of these art deco models also came in 2-tone gold (white gold sections along with yellow or green gold) which are also very desired and rare.

The fourth period began in the early 1930s, and is characterized by the Streamline Moderne influence on the styling of the cases. Many of these watches featured a new 207 movement, 12/0-size with 17 jewels (of which only 40,000 were made) and included such sleek designs as the Futura, Chesterfield, Wentworth, Andover, and the 14kt Rockliffe. Many of these are very similar to watches made at the time by the Hamilton Watch Company.

Some Illinois 12/0-size 207 movements were finished with the Hamilton name and used in the 401 series of Hamilton wrist watches, which premiered in 1934 and were named after famous explorers including Stanley, Livingstone, Byrd, and others. Many Illinois collectors also collect these pieces since they contain movements derived from Illinois-made movements. Some think that the Hamilton Watch Company purchased the Illinois Watch Company merely to expedite the production of a rectangular-shaped movement, but this is uncertain.

In the 1950s, Hamilton offered a line of Illinois and Hamilton-Illinois wrist watches with Swiss movements. These have absolutely nothing in common with the "originals" except the name. They are not considered collectible by die-hard Illinois collectors. Caution should be exercised when buying Hamilton-Illinois off auction sites as many sellers mis-represent these 1950s models as examples of 1930s Illinois produced by Hamilton.

== See also ==
- History of watches
- Hamilton Watch Company
- Elgin National Watch Company
- Benrus
