= Milo Barnum Richardson =

Milo Barnum Richardson (February 13, 1849 – May 17, 1912) was president of the Barnum Richardson Company. He served as a state representative and a state senator. Richardson was the son of industrialist Leonard Richardson. Milo B. Richardson served on the Connecticut Board of World's Fair Commissioners at the World's Columbian Exposition of 1893. He was also the first cousin of Ada Willard Richardson, the daughter of renowned building contractor William Douglas Richardson, and who married Illinois banker George Wallace Bunn, Sr. (See: John Whitfield Bunn and Jacob Bunn).
