= Ensign Manufacturing Company =

Rolling stock manufacturer

- Company type: private
- Industry: rail transport
- Founded: 1872
- Headquarters: Huntington, WV, United States
- Products: freight cars

Ensign Manufacturing Company, founded as Ensign Car Works in 1872, was a railroad car manufacturing company based in Huntington, West Virginia. In the 1880s and 1890s Ensign's production of wood freight cars made the company one of the three largest sawmill operators in Cabell County. In 1899, Ensign and twelve other companies were merged to form American Car and Foundry Company.

== History ==
Ensign Car Works was founded in Huntington, West Virginia, in 1872 by Ely Ensign and William H. Barnum, who managed a car wheel manufacturing company, the Barnum and Richardson Company, in Connecticut. The company was incorporated on November 1, 1872. Financing was provided primarily by Barnum and Collis P. Huntington, who was one of the principals in the Central Pacific Railroad and after whom the town of Huntington was named.

For the first ten years of production, Ensign manufactured iron parts such as railroad car wheels. The company began building wooden freight cars in the early 1880s, selling a large portion of its output to the Chesapeake and Ohio, Southern Pacific and Central Pacific railroads, all of which were controlled by Huntington.

In 1881, Ferdinand E. Canda, a proponent of wooden freight car design who had built freight cars in the 1870s in Chicago, joined the Ensign Car Works as general manager. Canda designed an improved stock car to haul cattle and ordered 1,000 cars of this design from Ensign in 1890. The cars were delivered to the Canda Cattle Car Company. Canda then designed an improvement to the drop-bottom gondola which was used in coal service at the time. His design featured a pair of sliding sheet metal doors (as opposed to the more common hinged doors) at the car's center. A car of this design, built at Ensign, was shown at the World's Columbian Exposition in Chicago in 1893. After the exposition and Panic of 1893, Ensign Car Works closed for seven months, reopening on January 3, 1894.

With Huntington's backing, Canda designed a 40-foot (12 m) long boxcar that could carry 50 tons of freight. Canda's design used wood construction despite the fact that steel construction was becoming more common in freight car design at the time. Huntington purchased 2,000 cars for Southern Pacific Railroad following this design.

After the 1899 merger that formed American Car and Foundry Company (ACF), Canda stayed on with the former Ensign plant designing and building Central Pacific Railroad's largest wooden-frame hopper cars. The car design was similar to CP's earlier large boxcar order, featuring a 50-ton capacity in a 36-foot (11 m) long car, but this car included cast steel bolsters. CP ordered 300 cars of this design.

Freight car production continued at the former Ensign plant under ACF, with the first all-steel freight car built in the winter of 1905/06. During World War II, a number of cars were built there to British designs for export. The former Ensign plant continued as a major freight car manufacturing plant through the 1990s, when the plant was used to produce ACF's Centerflow hoppers.
