= Hamilton Watch Company =

Swiss watch manufacturer

- Type: Subsidiary
- Industry: Watchmaking
- Founded: 1892, Lancaster, Pennsylvania, U.S.
- Headquarters: Bienne, Switzerland
- Number of locations: ~3000
- Area served: Worldwide
- Parent: The Swatch Group
- Website: hamiltonwatch.com

The Hamilton Watch Company is a Swiss watch manufacturer based in Bienne, Switzerland. Founded in 1892 as an American firm, the Hamilton Watch Company ended American manufacture in 1969, shifting manufacturing operations to the Buren factory in Switzerland. Through a series of mergers and acquisitions, the Hamilton Watch Company eventually became integrated into the Swatch Group, the world's largest watch manufacturing and marketing conglomerate.

== Early history ==
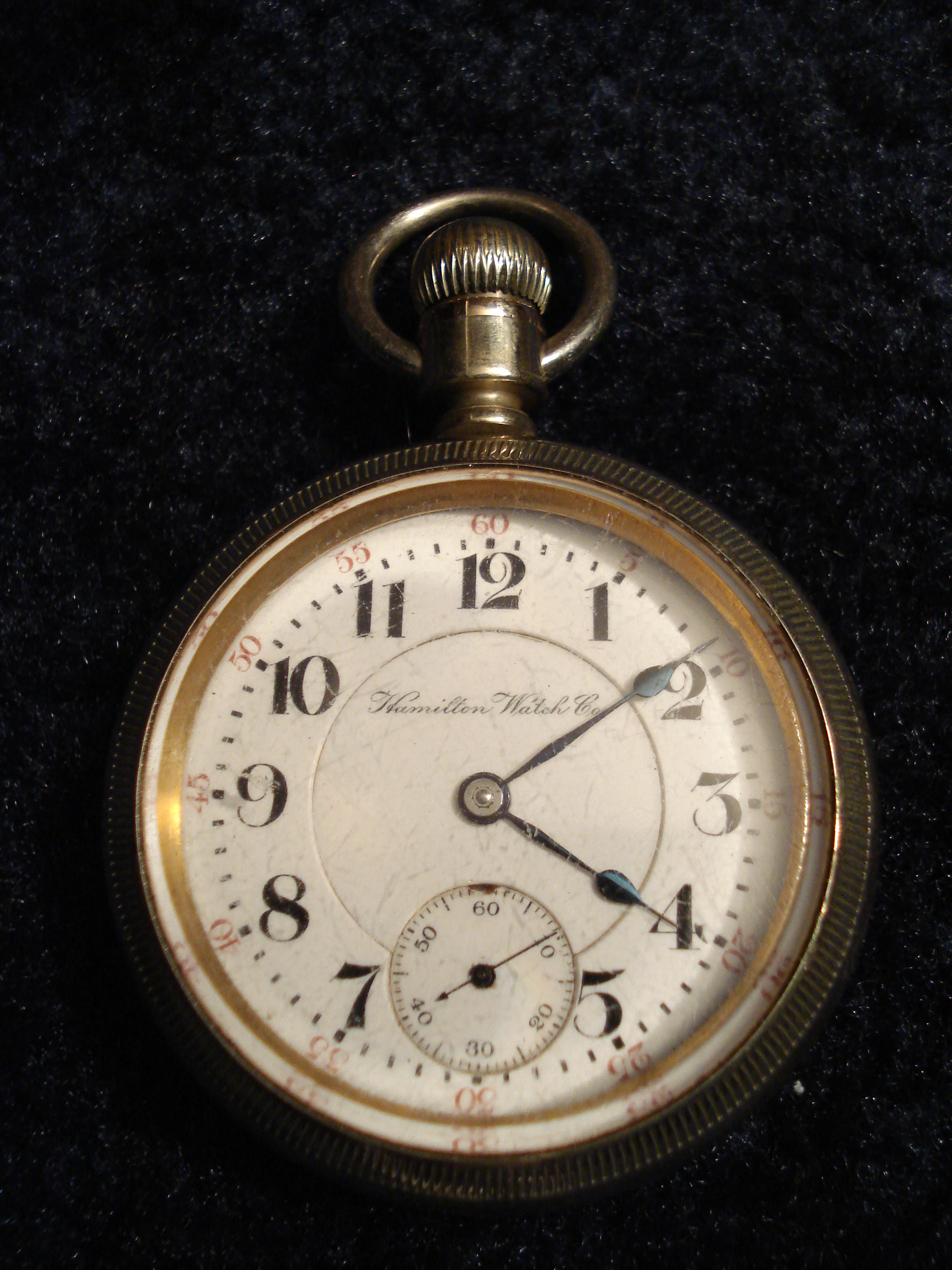
Hamilton pocket watch, ca. 1904

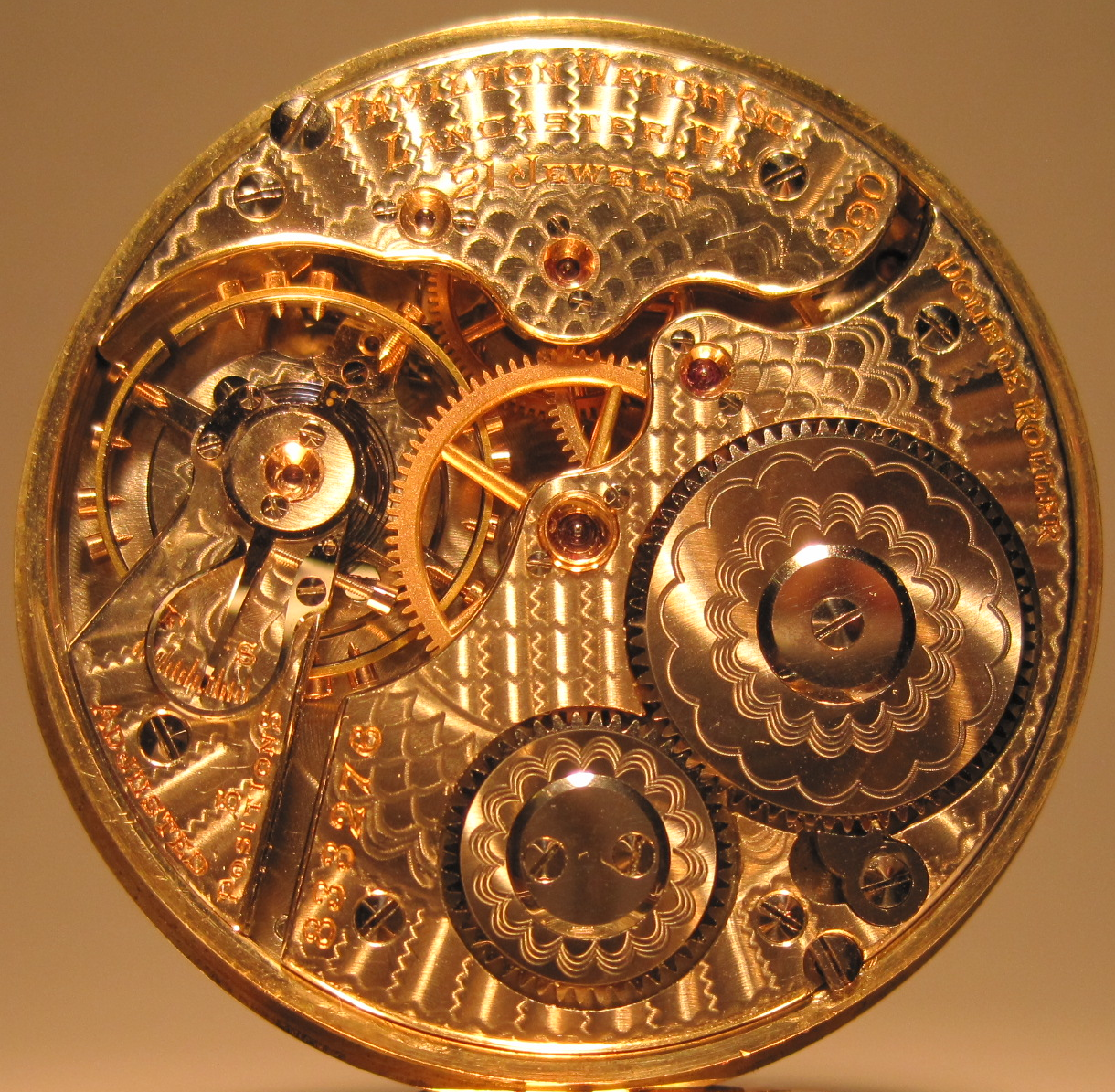
Hamilton 990 movement, ca. 1910

Hamilton succeeded three watch firms manufacturing timepieces in the same facilities in Lancaster, Pennsylvania, U.S., including the Adams & Perry Watch Manufacturing Company, Lancaster Watch Company Ltd., Lancaster Watch Company and the Keystone Watch Company. The precursor to the Hamilton Watch Co., the Lancaster, Pennsylvania, based Keystone Standard Watch Co., was started by Abram Bitner in 1886 with the purchase of Lancaster Watch Company's factory. Lancaster, then Keystone manufactured watches featuring a patented "Dust Proof" design that used a small mica window to cover the only opening in the plate of the movement. This patent represents Hamilton’s transition from simple dust covers to integrated sealed case engineering and is often cited as a foundational U.S. industrial solution to dust & moisture ingress before modern gasket standards. Keystone existed until 1891 when the company was sold to Hamilton Watch Company.

The Hamilton Watch Company was established in 1892 after Keystone Standard Watch Company was purchased from bankruptcy. Aurora Watch Company of Illinois also merged into Keystone during the same year. The name of the new company was originally to be "Columbian," but when it was discovered the Waterbury Watch Company had trademarked that name, a meeting of stockholders was called in November 1892 and a new name selected. The company was named after Andrew Hamilton, a Scottish-born attorney who laid out and founded Lancaster County, Pennsylvania, and was the original owner of the Lancaster site on which the factory was situated.

During the expansion of the railroads in the U.S., Hamilton maintained over 56% of the market. Railroads purchased all of Hamilton's production. The company manufactured wristwatches as the market switched from pocket watches to wristwatches after World War I. During World War II, Hamilton retooled its business model to serve the military, dropping its consumer products.

The Hamilton Watch Company was housed on a 13-acre (53,000 m^{2}) complex in Lancaster. Hamilton took possession of Aurora Watch Company's machinery shortly after incorporation.

The first watch made under the Hamilton name was an 18-size 17-jewel pocket watch in 1893. During Hamilton's first fifteen years, only two size movements were produced – the 18-size and the smaller 16-size.

The company's first series of pocket watches, the Broadway Limited, was marketed as the "Watch of Railroad Accuracy," and Hamilton became popular by making accurate railroad watches. Hamilton introduced its first wristwatch in 1917, designed to appeal to men entering World War I and containing the 0-sized 17-jewel 983 movement initially designed for women's pendent watches. In 1928, Hamilton purchased the Illinois Watch Company for over $5 million from the heirs of John Whitfield Bunn and Jacob Bunn. Some of the most collectible early Hamilton wristwatches include The Oval, The Tonneau, The Rectangular, The Square Enamel, The Coronado, The Piping Rock, The Spur, The Glendale, The Pinehurst, The Langley, The Byrd, The Cambridge, the Barrel "B", and The Flintridge. Many models came in both solid gold and gold-filled cases, and, though rare, some wristwatches such as the Grant were made of sterling silver.

== Marine chronometers ==
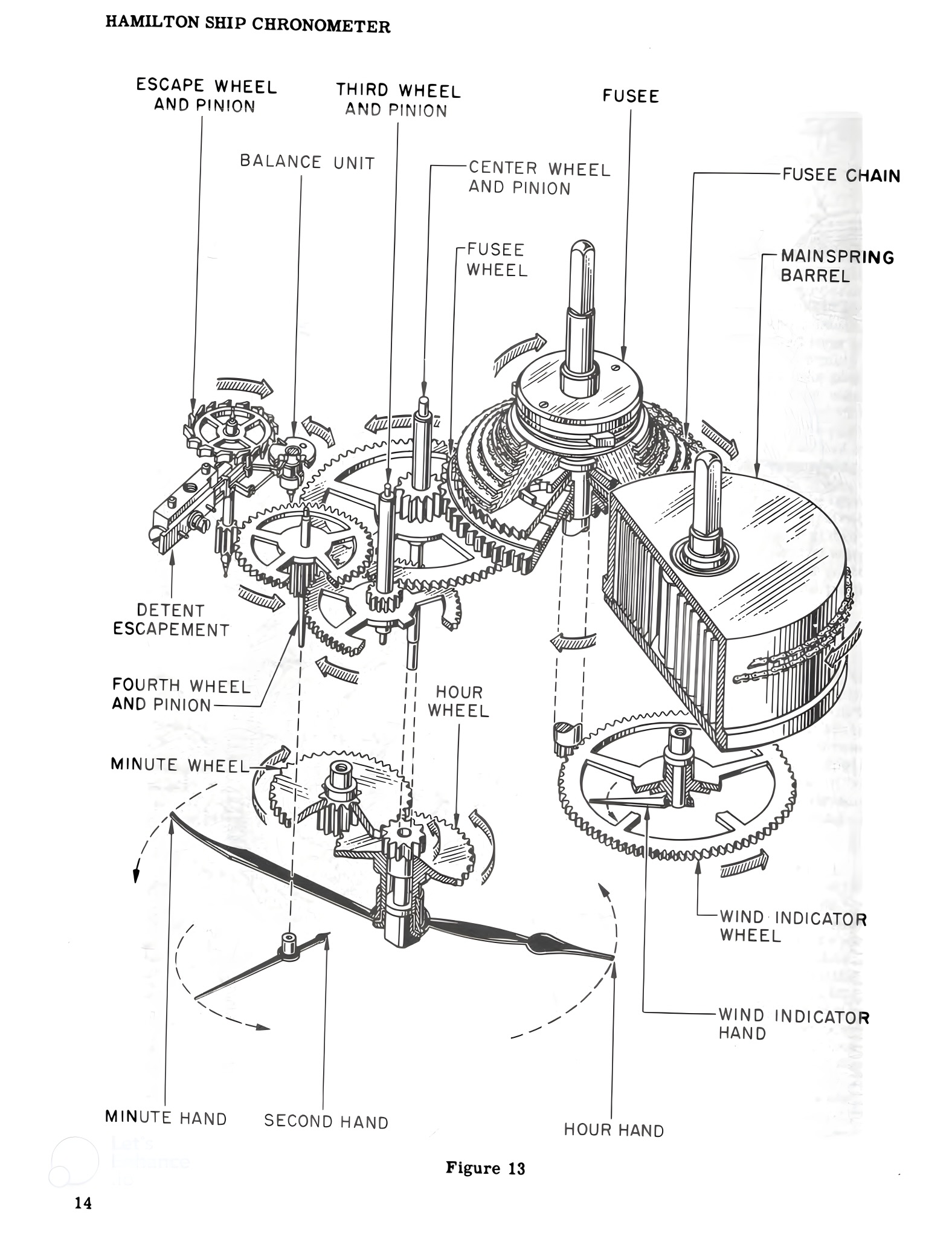
Inner working of the Hamilton Model 21 marine chronometer

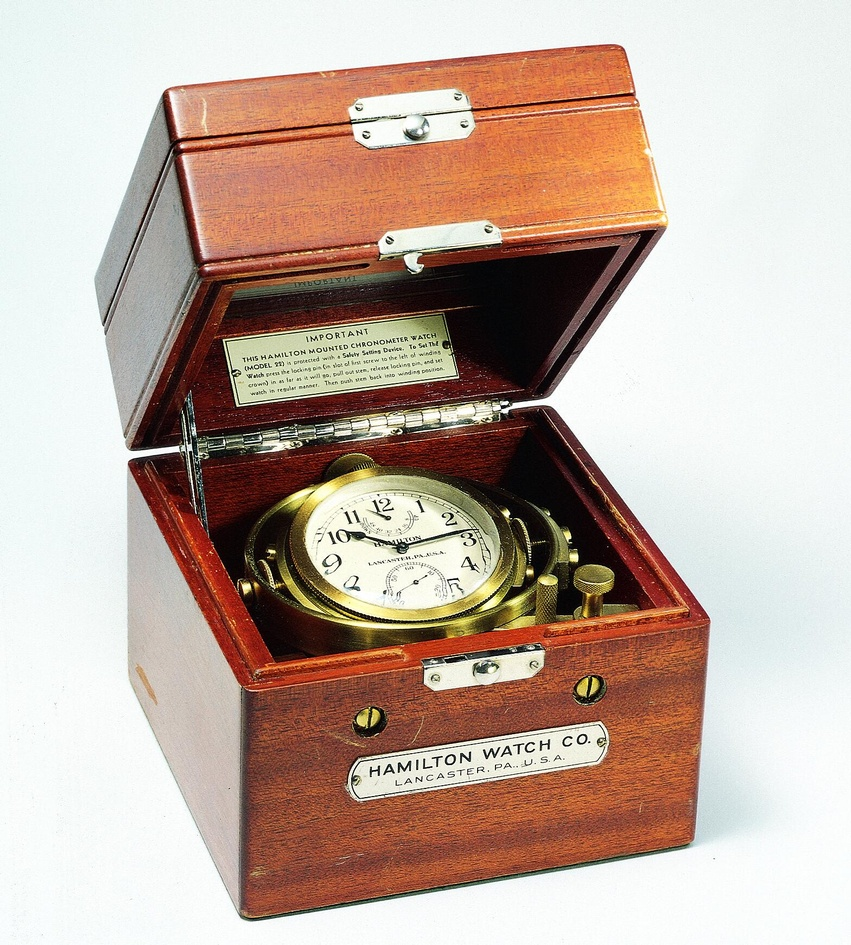
Hamilton Model 22 Chronometer, mass-produced during World War II

During World War II, production of consumer watches was stopped, with all watches manufactured being shipped to troops. More than one million watches were sent overseas.

Up to then, the production of marine chronometer timepieces used by mariners for determining longitude and fix their position by celestial navigation at sea, was a highly skilled mainly craft-based and hence expensive horology niche, and marine chronometers used by United States ships were imported or used foreign key components. The U.S. Naval Observatory had asked American watch manufacturers in 1939 to participate in domestically mass-producing chronometers. Hamilton was provided with two Swiss Ulysse Nardin marine chronometers to examine. Hamilton successfully perfected the mass production process and parts interchangeability maintenance method for these specialized timekeepers. The US Navy accepted its product in 1942. The industrial production methods enabled the company to produce marine chronometers and deck watches in large numbers to fill the navigational needs of the US Navy, merchant marine, and other Allied navies as well. The Model 21 Hamilton Marine Chronometer for large vessels was built first and had a chain-drive fusee, the second hand advanced in 1/2-second increments over a 60-second-marked sub-dial, and was kept in a traditional gimbaled double box for the express purpose of keeping the clock in a "dial up" position to minimize ship-movement-induced timing errors. In most respects, the Model 21 marine chronometer technically resembled the Ulysse Nardin design, except for a new balance design and the use of a pre-formed Elinvar alloy balance spring, to obviate the cumbersome spring adjustments previously necessary. Hamilton produced 8,900 Model 21 marine chronometers for the US Navy, 1,500 for merchant shipping, and 500 for the US Army during the war. The Model 22 Chronometer Watch followed it for smaller vessels. The Model 22 looked like a large pocket watch and had a traditional mainspring, available in a traditional gimbaled double box and also in a deck watch for larger ships for transferring time from the box marine chronometer(s) for position fixes. The Models 21 and 22 had a two-day power reserve and the movements of both were marked "U.S. Navy Bureau of Ships". The Model 22 was also used by the U.S. Army, and on the back of some, it is marked "U.S. Army", but all the Model 22 movements are marked "U.S. Navy Bureau of Ships". The Model 23 was a 16-size chronograph pocket watch. The Model 4992b was in a 16-size case with a black dial. It was used as the pocket watch for the U.S. military, featuring a less accurate 21-jewel railroad grade movement.

By 1970, 13,086 Hamilton Model 21 Marine Chronometers had been produced. In 1985, the British Ministry of Defence invited bids by tender to dispose of their mechanical Hamilton Model 21 Marine Chronometers. The U.S. Navy kept their Hamilton Model 21 Marine Chronometers in service as backups to the Loran-C hyperbolic radio navigation system until 1988 when the GPS global navigation satellite system was approved as reliable.

== 1950s: last decade as a watch manufacturing powerhouse in America ==
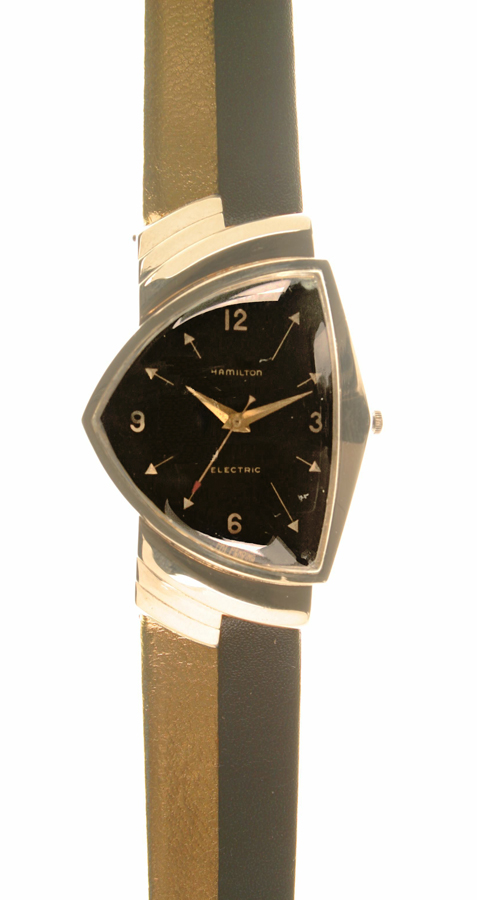
Hamilton Ventura, 1957

In 1951, Hamilton rebuffed a hostile takeover bid by the Benrus watch company. The fallout from the failed takeover action culminated in Hamilton Watch Co. vs Benrus Watch Co. (206 F.2d 738, 740 (2d Cir. 1953)), a Federal proceeding that is considered to be landmark case in the realm of Federal anti-trust case law.

In 1955, Hamilton provided a "celestial time zone clock, permitting flight-type navigation" for the Astra-Gnome concept of what an automobile would look like in the year 2000.

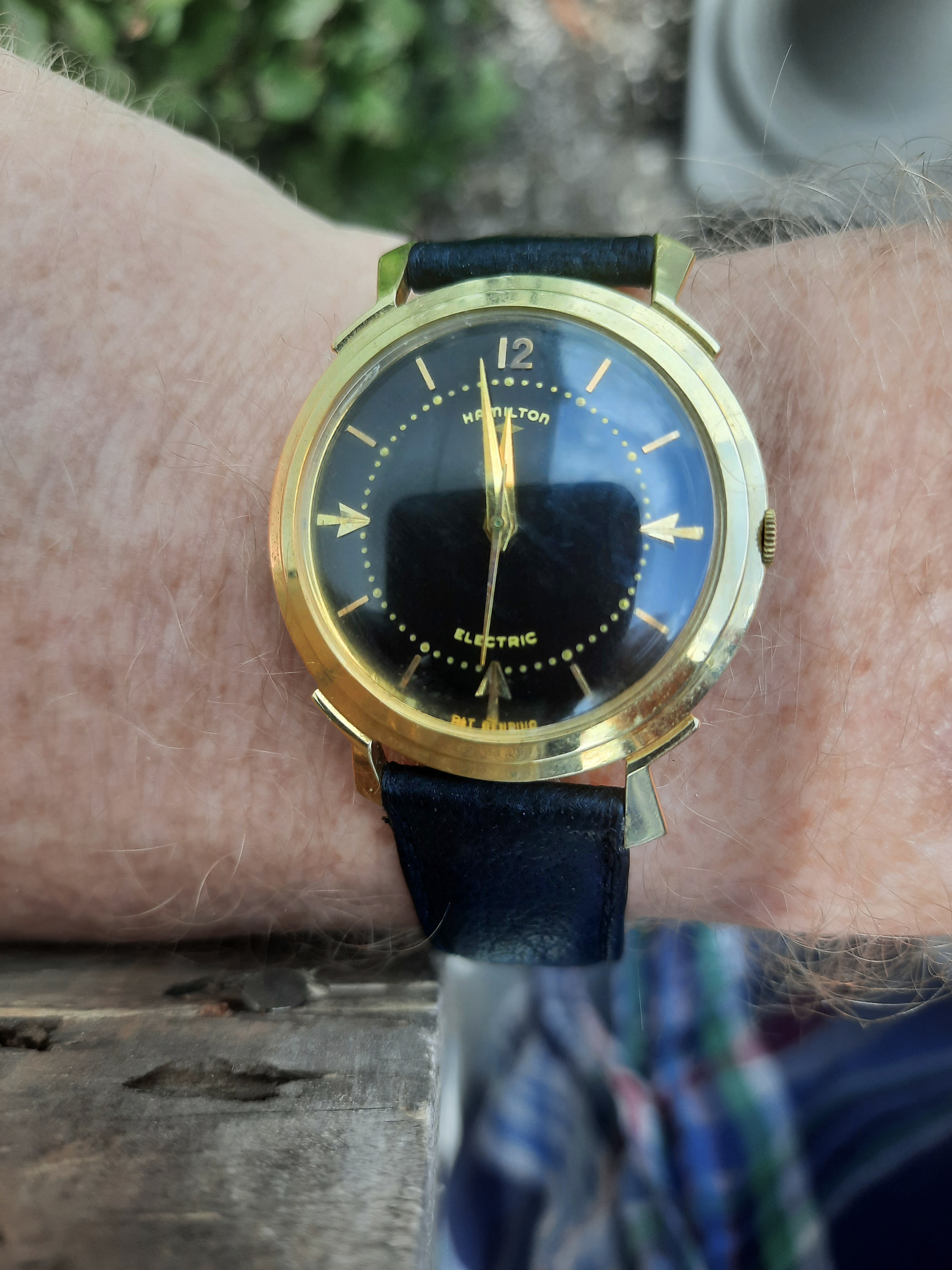
The Hamilton Electric 500

In 1957, Hamilton introduced the world's first electric watch, the Hamilton Electric 500. It was available in a variety of non-traditional asymmetrical case styles including the Ventura that was designed by Richard Arbib. The watch was worn by Elvis Presley, who also featured it in the movie Blue Hawaii.

In 1962, Hamilton entered into a joint venture (60% owned by Hamilton) with the Japanese watchmaking firm Ricoh to produce electric watches meant primarily for the Japanese market. The electronic components were produced at Hamilton's Lancaster factory. At the same time, Ricoh undertook mechanical works production and final assembly in Japan. Although production levels of Hamilton-Ricoh watches were high (over 1000 per month), demand was low. Consequently, the Hamilton-Ricoh partnership could not compete with the substantial market presence of Seiko. The partnership was dissolved in 1965, with the remaining Hamilton-Ricoh electronic movements (marked "Ricoh 555E") re-cased as "Vantage" and sold in the U.S.

== Swiss/U.S. operations: 1969–1974 ==
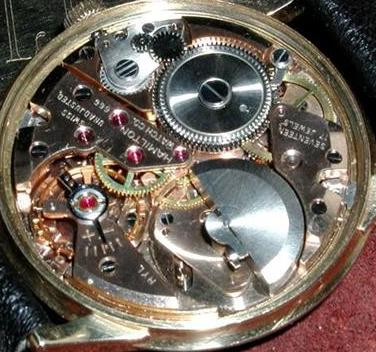
Swiss Hamilton/Buren Micro-rotor movement

In 1966, Hamilton acquired the Buren Watch Company of Büren an der Aare, Switzerland, including all factories and technologies Buren had developed up to that point. From 1966 to 1969, Hamilton Lancaster and Buren Switzerland were operated as a joint concern, with Hamilton using several Swiss movements for their "American" watches and Buren utilizing several components manufactured by Hamilton Lancaster. It was during this time that Hamilton started to selectively incorporate the highly innovative Buren Micro-rotor (a.k.a. Micro Rotor/Micro-rotor) movement into small numbers of certain upper tier watches, in addition to their ordinary hand-wound and traditional automatic watches.

The Buren (now Hamilton/Buren) Micro-rotor was the first patented automatic wristwatch movement to eliminate the sizable external oscillating weight inherent to most automatic winding watches. Instead, it utilized a much smaller weight that was entirely integrated into the chassis of the movement. This design allowed for a substantially slimmer automatic watch that still retained a center sweep second hand. The Micro-rotor concept was also conceived by Universal Genève for use in their Polerouter series of timepieces during this same time. The official title of "first Micro-rotor movement" is still in dispute among some horology aficionados, even though Buren patented their design in 1954, and Universal Geneve applied for their patent in May 1955.

In 1969, the Hamilton Watch Company completely ended American manufacturing operations with the closure of its factory in Lancaster, Pennsylvania, shifting manufacturing operations to the Buren factory in Switzerland.

From 1969 to 1972, all new Hamilton watches were produced in Switzerland by Hamilton's Buren subsidiary. In 1971, the Buren brand was returned to Swiss ownership. By 1972, the Buren-Hamilton partnership was dissolved, and the factory liquidated, due to decreased interest and sales of the Hamilton-Buren product.

On May 16, 1974, the Hamilton brand was sold to SSIH (subsequently The Swatch Group).

== Transitional watches: 1970s–present ==
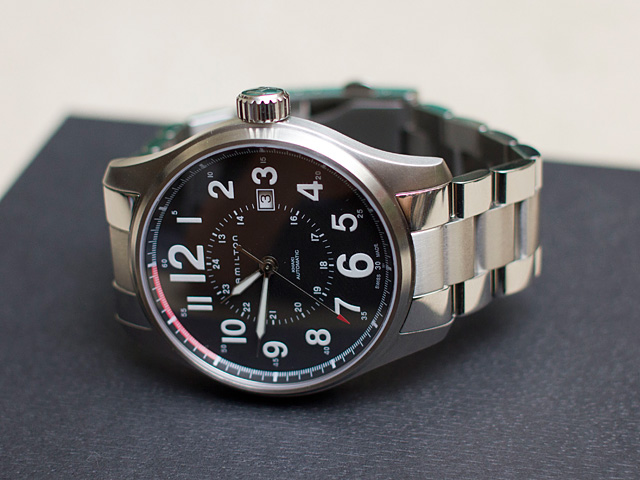
Hamilton Khaki Field Officer H70615133

In 1971, the Omega & Tissot Holding Company SSIH purchased the Hamilton brand. It utilized the Hamilton name for several branding efforts, including numerous quartz watches in the 1980s.

The Hamilton Watch Division became a subsidiary of HMW. The Hamilton Watch Company changed its name to HMW when it sold its Watch division to SSIH.

A team led by John Bergey of Hamilton Watch developed the Pulsar, the world's first electronic digital watch.

Through the merger of SSIH and ASUAG Groups in 1984, Hamilton became a subsidiary of The Swatch Group.

In 2020, Hamilton released a limited edition of 888 pieces of the Hamilton Khaki Navy BeLOWZERO inspired by the prop Hamilton watches made for Christopher Nolan's film TENET. In the film, John David Washington also wears a steel Hamilton Jazzmaster Seaview Chronograph.

== Popular culture ==
Hamilton watches and clocks have appeared in the films Shanghai Express, Interstellar, Oppenheimer, The Frogmen, 2001: A Space Odyssey, Men in Black, The Talented Mr. Ripley, King of the Hill, Ocean’s 8, The Martian, Indiana Jones and the Dial of Destiny, Independence Day, Pearl Harbor, Live and Let Die, and A Good Day to Die Hard, as well as TV shows Mad Men and Jack Ryan. Hamilton watches have appeared in video games like Far Cry 6, Death Stranding 2: On the Beach, Call of Duty: Black Ops 7, and Resident Evil Requiem.

=== Behind the Camera Awards ===
In 2006, the Hamilton Behind the Camera awards began presenting technical achievement awards to set designers, screenwriters, prop masters, visual effects specialists and costume designers in Hollywood movies. Notable presenters and winners have included Sean Baker, Amy Poehler, Hans Zimmer, Pamela Anderson, Elle Fanning, Viola Davis, Rian Johnson, Jordan Peele, Frankie Faison, Ryan Gosling, Rosamund Pike, Jake Gyllenhaal, Maggie Gyllenhaal, Kristen Stewart, Regina King, Mahershala Ali, Jamie Dornan, Peter Sarsgaard, Awkwafina, Kelly Marie Tran, Javier Bardem, Denis Villeneuve, Simon Rex, Kirsten Dunst, Ann Dowd, Martha Plimpton, Reed Birney, Jason Isaacs and Marlee Matlin.

== See also ==
- Benrus
- Elgin Watch Company
- Gruen Watch Co.
- Illinois Watch Company
- Waltham Watch Company
- Wittnauer
- List of watch manufacturers
