= Elgin National Watch Company =

Major American watch maker (1864–1968)

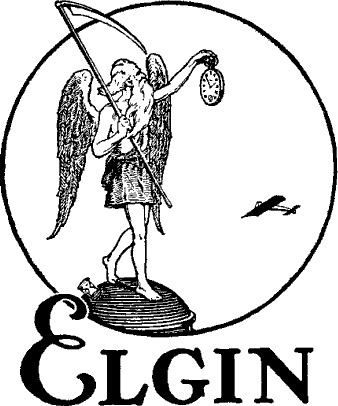
- ENWC "Father Time" logo
- Industry: Watch manufacturing
- Predecessor: National Watch Company
- Founded: 1863
- Founder: Philo Carpenter; Howard Z. Culver; Benjamin W. Raymond; George M. Wheeler; Thomas S. Dickerson; Edward H. Williams; W. Robbins
- Defunct: 1968
- Headquarters: Elgin, Illinois, United States
- Products: Pocket watches, wrist watches, bomb sights and precision instruments

The Elgin National Watch Company, commonly known as Elgin Watch Company, was a major US watchmaker from 1864 to 1968. The company sold watches under the names Elgin, Lord Elgin, and Lady Elgin.

For nearly 100 years, the company's manufacturing complex in Elgin, Illinois, was the world's largest site dedicated to watchmaking.

== History ==
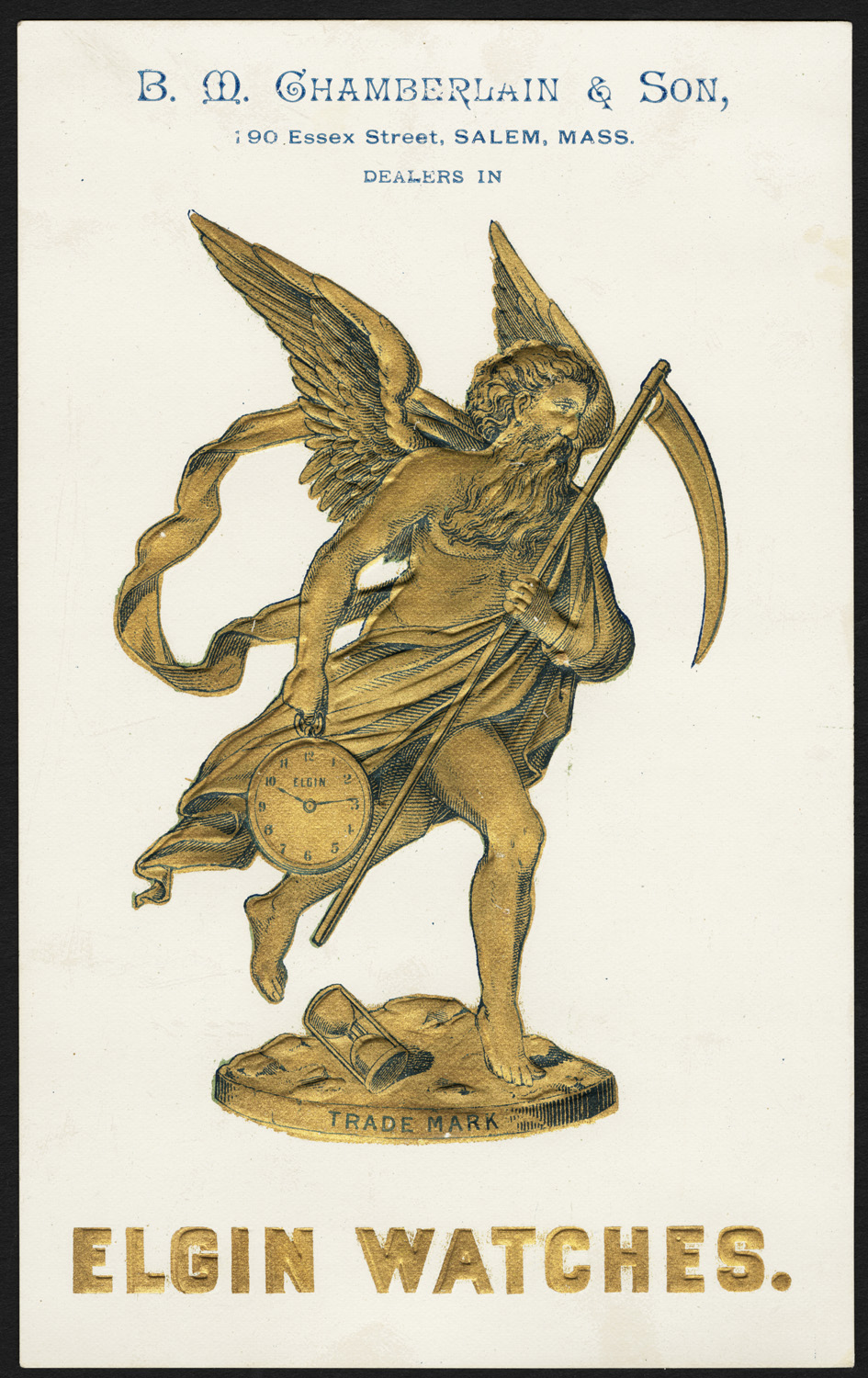
19th-century business card with Elgin logo

The company was first incorporated in August 1864 as the National Watch Company in Chicago, Illinois, by Philo Carpenter, Howard Z. Culver, Benjamin W. Raymond, George M. Wheeler, Thomas S. Dickerson and W. Robbins. In September of the same year, the founders visited the Waltham Watch Company in Waltham, Massachusetts, and successfully convinced seven of Waltham's watchmakers to come to work for their new company.

The growing young city of Elgin, Illinois, some 30 miles northwest of Chicago, was chosen as the factory site. Initially, as part of the deal, the city was asked to donate 35 acres (142,000 m^{2}) of land for the construction of the factory. The city selected a derelict farm; however, the owners refused to sell the property unless the city purchased their entire 71 acres for $3,550. Four Elgin businessmen agreed to acquire the property and then donated the required 35 acres to the watch company. The company reorganized in April 1865 and completed the factory in 1866. The first movement, delivered in 1867, was named the B.W. Raymond in honor of Benjamin W. Raymond. The watch was an 18-size, full plate design. In 1869, the National Watch Company won "Best Watches, Illinois Manufacture" at the 17th Annual Illinois State Fair, for which it won a silver medal. The company officially changed its name to the Elgin National Watch Company in 1874, as the Elgin name had come into common usage for their watches. In the late-19th century J. A. Coburn started his career as a cornetist for the Elgin National Watch Company's military band.

== Later history ==
The company built the Elgin National Watch Company Observatory in 1910 to maintain scientifically precise times in their watches. The company produced many of the self-winding wristwatch movements made in the United States, beginning with the 607 and 618 calibers (which were bumper wind) and the calibers 760 and 761 (30 and 27 jewels respectively).

During World War II, the company halted all civilian manufacturing. It moved into the defense industry, manufacturing military watches, chronometers, fuzes for artillery shells, altimeters, and other aircraft instruments and sapphire bearings used for aiming cannons.

Over time, the company operated several additional plants, mostly in Elgin. However, the company also located additional plants in Aurora, Illinois, and Lincoln, Nebraska. In 1963, the company relocated most manufacturing operations to a new plant in Blaney, a town near Columbia, South Carolina, which renamed itself Elgin, South Carolina. The original, obsolete factory in Elgin closed in 1964 after having produced half of the total number of pocket watches manufactured in the United States (dollar-type not included). The plant, including its iconic clock tower, was razed in 1966. The company maintained a leased building in Elgin that housed offices and casing, fitting, shipping, service, and trade material departments until about 1970.

The company discontinued all US manufacturing in 1968 and sold the rights to the name "Elgin", which were subsequently resold multiple times over the years. The rights eventually were purchased by MZ Berger Inc., which manufactures its watches in China and distributes them outside traditional watch dealerships. Elgin-branded watches produced after 1968 have no connection to the Elgin Watch Company.

The city of Elgin, North Dakota, derives its name from the watch brand. Likewise, NBA Hall of Famer Elgin Baylor was named after the Elgin National Watch Company.

== Gallery ==
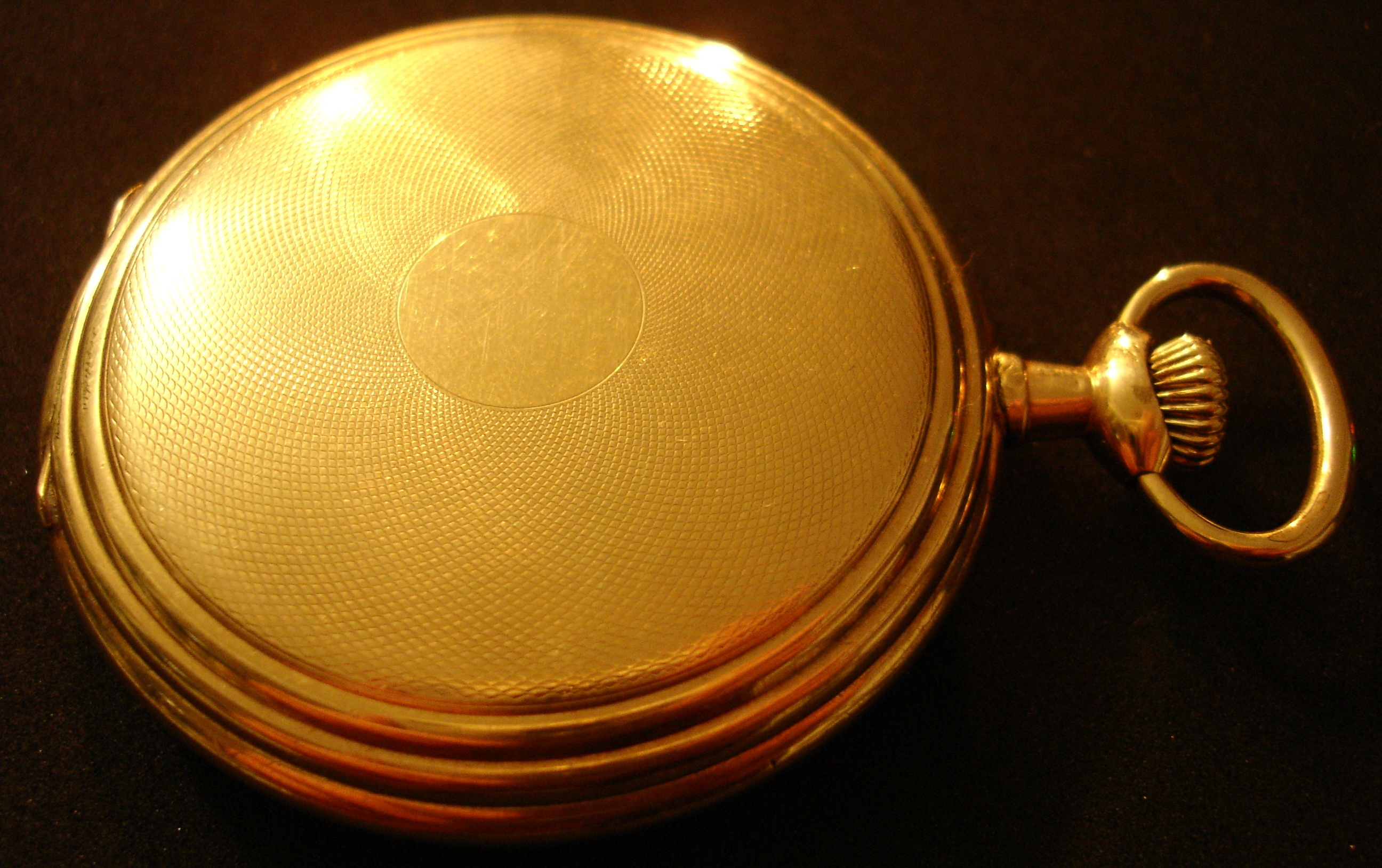
Front of an Elgin pocket watch from 1911 in a hunter-style closed case with the stem located at the 3 o'clock position.

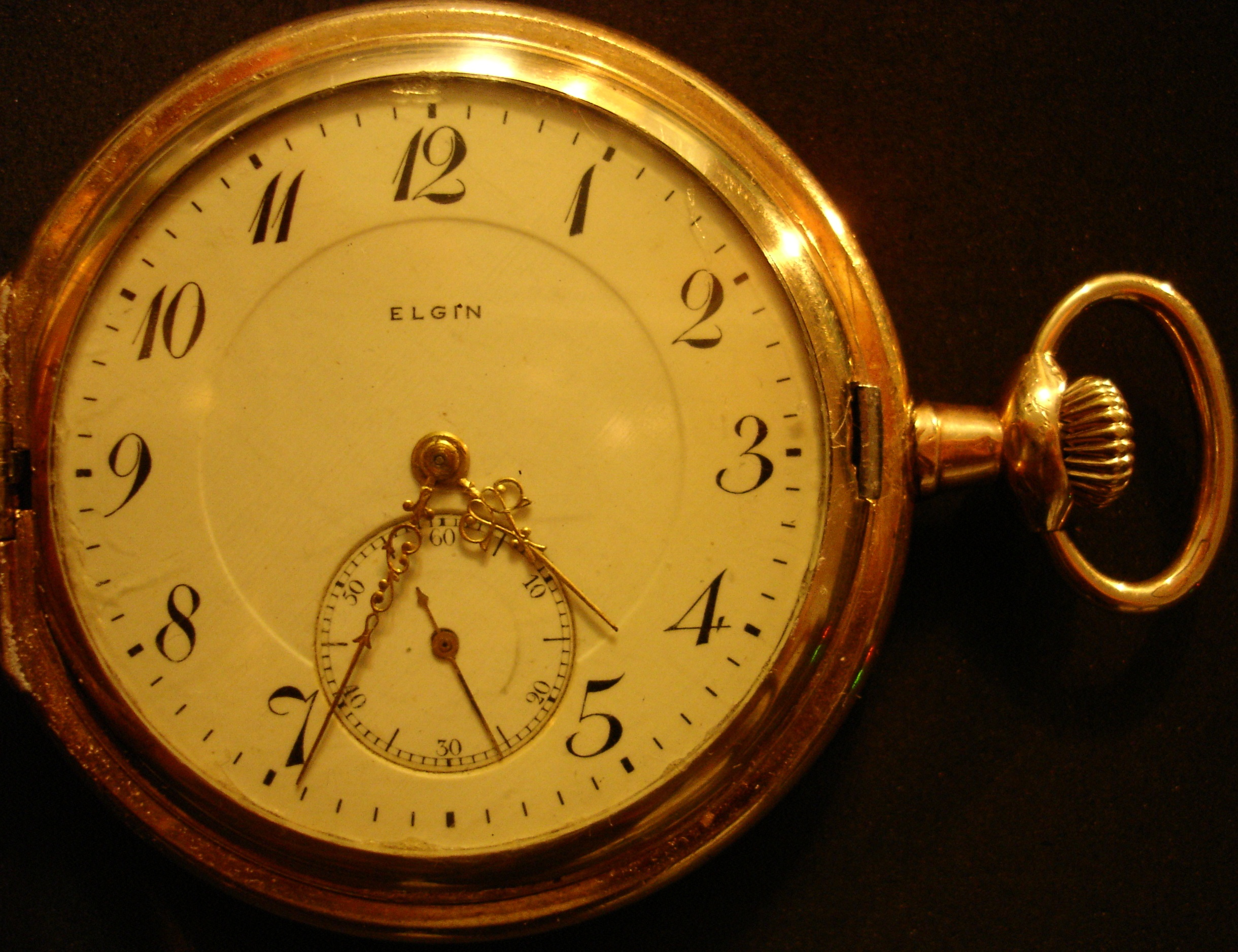
Pocket watch with opened cover plate.

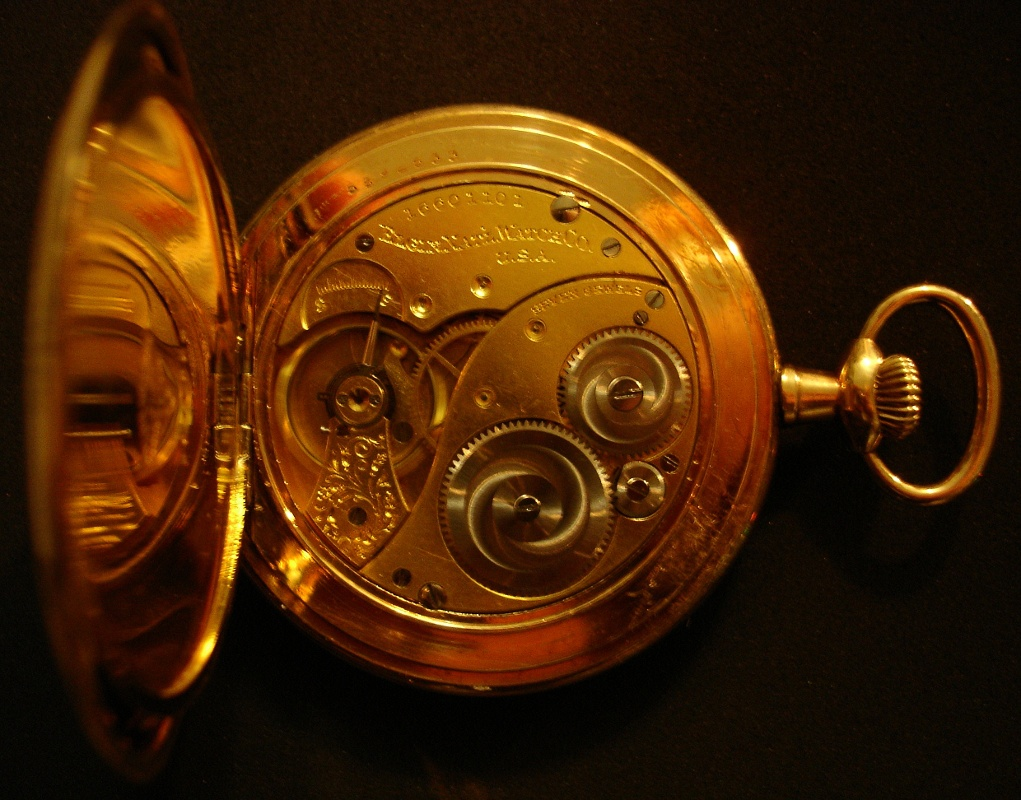
Movement of the same pocket watch.

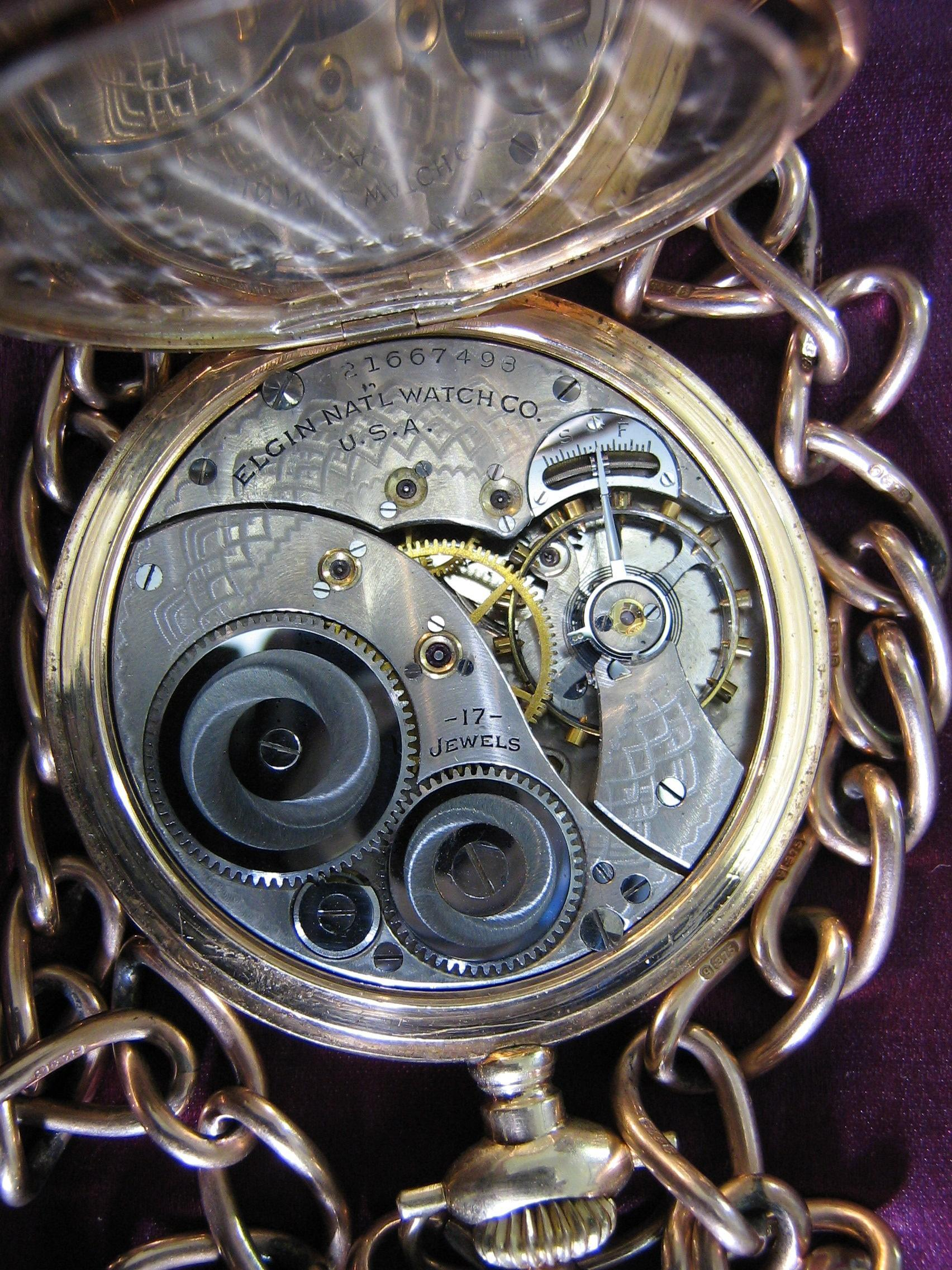
Movement of an Elgin pocket watch. cir.1919 S/N 21,667,498

== See also ==
- Gruen Watch Co.
- Waltham Watch Company
- Hamilton Watch Company
- Pulsar
- Benrus
- Illinois Watch Company

== Sources ==
- Complete Watch Guide, by Cooksey Shugart, Tom Engle, Richard E. Gilbert, 1998 ed., ISBN 1-57432-064-5
