= Lateiner =

Lateiner is a surname. Notable people with the surname include:

- Joseph Lateiner (1853–1935), Yiddish language playwright
- Jacob Lateiner (1928–2010), Cuban-American pianist
- Isidor Lateiner (1930–2005), Cuban-American violinist
- Sarah Lateiner, American technical educator
