= Nash Metropolitan =

American subcompact car built in England (1953–1962)

Metropolitan
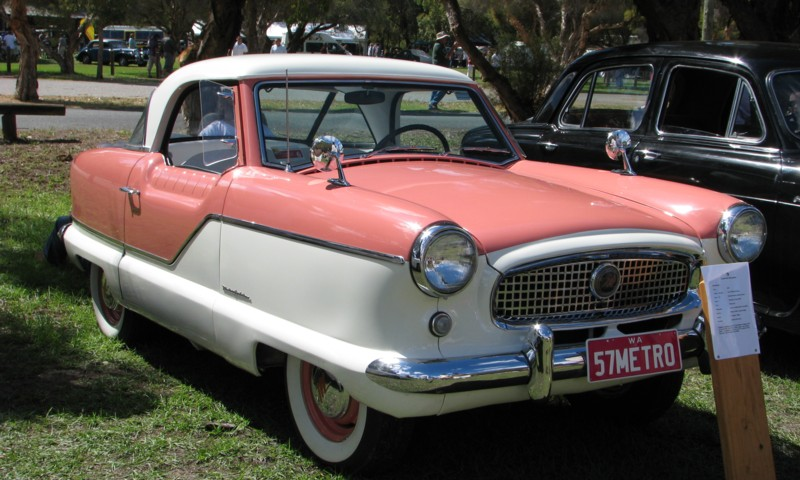
- 1957 Metropolitan

Overview
- Manufacturer: Austin (BMC)
- Also called: Hudson Metropolitan (1954–1957); Metropolitan by American Motors (1958–1962); Austin Metropolitan
- Production: October 1953–April 1961
- Model years: 1954–1962
- Assembly: Longbridge plant, Birmingham, West Midlands, England
- Designer: William J. Flajole

Body and chassis
- Class: Economy car; Subcompact car
- Body style: 2-door hardtop; 2-door convertible
- Layout: FR layout

Powertrain
- Engine: 1,200 cc (73 cu in) B-Series I4; 1,500 cc (92 cu in) B-Series I4
- Transmission: 3-speed manual

Dimensions
- Wheelbase: 85 in (2,159 mm)
- Length: 149.5 in (3,797 mm)
- Width: 61.5 in (1,562 mm)
- Height: 54.5 in (1,384 mm)
- Curb weight: 1,785–1,890 lb (810–857 kg) (base)

The Nash Metropolitan is an American automobile marketed from 1953 until 1962, manufactured in England. While designed and marketed in the United States by Nash and its successor companies, it was built entirely in British Motor Corporation factories using many existing BMC parts.

It conforms to two classes of vehicle: economy car and subcompact car. The Metropolitan is considered a "subcompact", but this category was not yet in use when the car was made. At that time, it was categorized as a "small automobile" as well as an "economy car".

The Metropolitan was also marketed as a Hudson model when Nash and Hudson merged in 1954 to form the American Motors Corporation (AMC). The Nash and Hudson lines were phased out in favor of the Rambler line, and in 1957, the Metropolitan became a standalone brand, badged with a stylized 'M' on hubcaps and the grille. The cars were also sold in the United Kingdom and other markets.

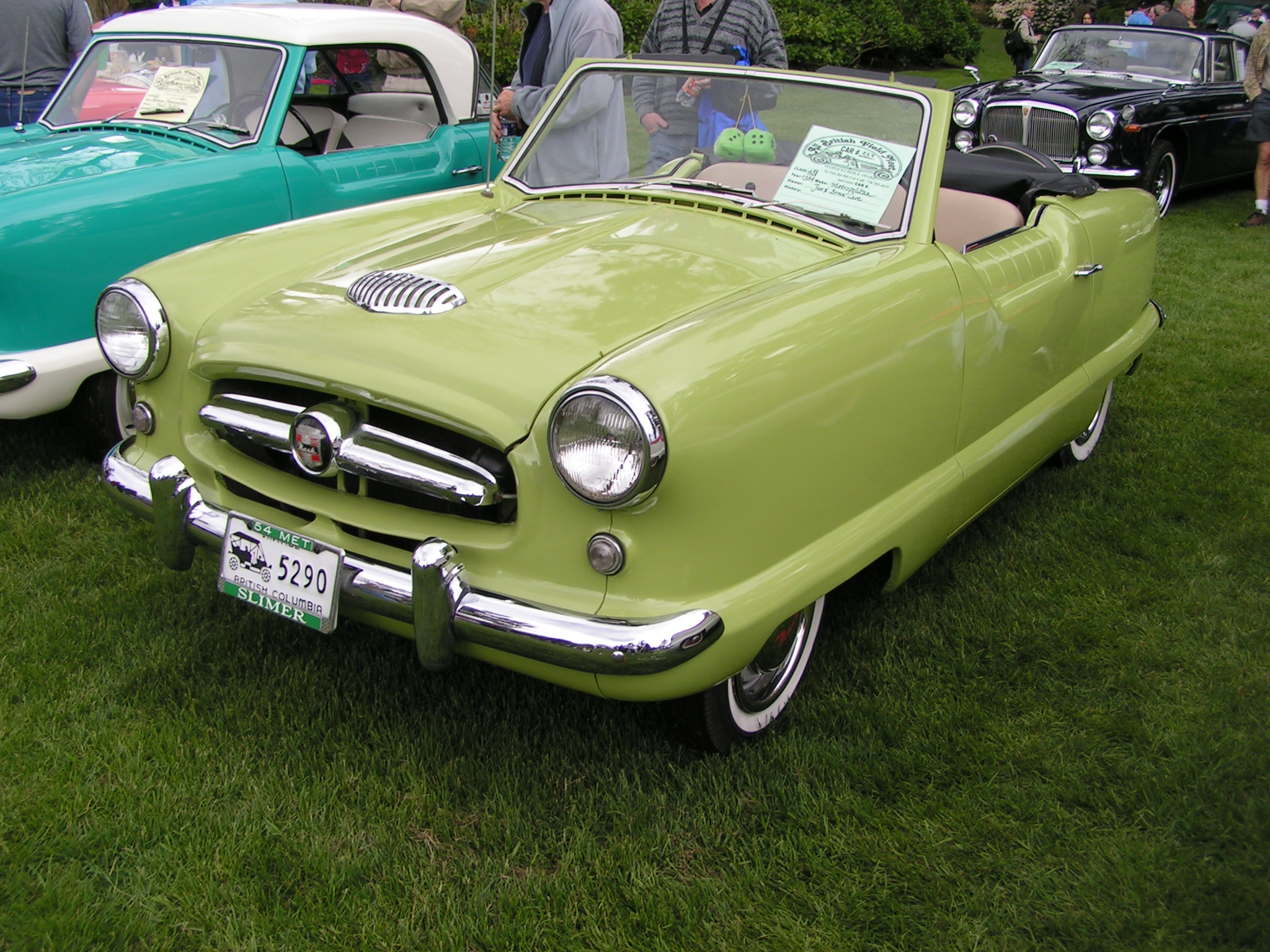
1954 Nash Metropolitan convertible

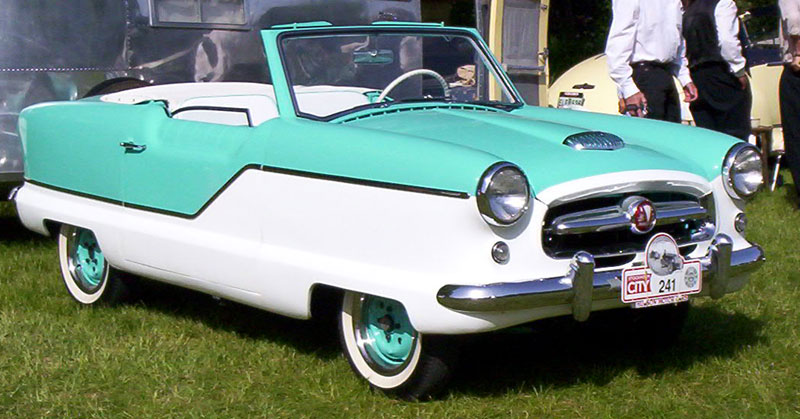
1957 Hudson Metropolitan

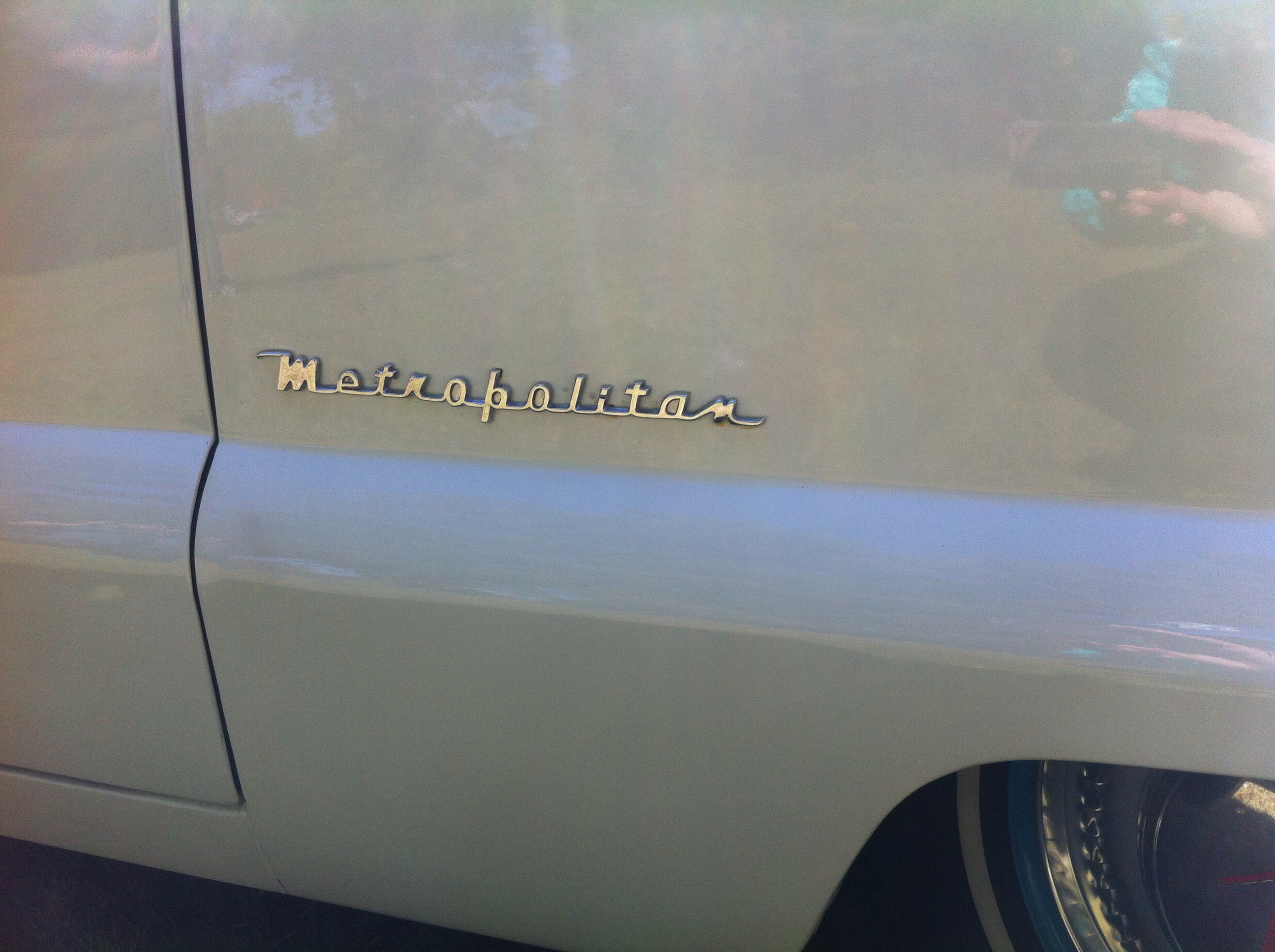
1961 Metropolitan fender emblem

== Design ==
While most domestic automobile makers were following a "bigger-is-better" philosophy, Nash Motor Company executives were examining the market to offer American buyers an economical transportation alternative. The Metropolitan was designed in Kenosha, Wisconsin. It was patterned from a concept car, the NXI (Nash Experimental International), that was built by Detroit-based independent designer William J. Flajole for Nash-Kelvinator. It was designed as the second car in a two car family, for Mom taking the kids to school or shopping or for Dad to drive to the railroad station to ride to work: the "commuter/shopping car" with resemblance to the big Nash, but the scale was tiny as the Met's wheelbase was shorter than the Volkswagen Beetle's.

The NXI design study incorporated many innovative features and attempted to use interchangeable front and rear components (the symmetrical door skins were the only interchangeable items used in production). Although more complex, the new vehicle also incorporated Nash's advanced single-unit (unit body) construction. It was displayed at several "surviews" (survey-previews), commencing on 4 January 1950, at the Waldorf-Astoria Hotel, New York, to gauge the reaction of the American motoring public to a car of this size. The result of these "surviews" convinced Nash that there was a market for such a car if it could be built at a competitive price.

A series of prototypes followed that incorporated many of the improvements from the "surviews" that included roll-up glass side windows, a more powerful engine, and a column-mounted transmission shifter with bench seat (rather than bucket-type seats with floor shift fitted in the concept car). The model was named NKI (for Nash-Kelvinator International), and it featured revised styling incorporating a hood blister and rear wheel cutouts.

Nash was positioning this new product for the postwar market as a "personal use" automobiles. These specific-use vehicles were focused as a second car for women or an economical commuter car. The Metropolitan was also aimed at returning Nash to overseas markets. However, Mason and Nash's management calculated that building such a car from scratch in the U.S. would be impossible because the tooling costs would have been prohibitive. The only cost-effective option was to build overseas using existing mechanical components (engine, transmission, rear end, suspension, brakes, electrical), leaving only the tooling cost for body panels and other unique elements.

With this in mind, Nash Motors negotiated with several European companies. On 5 October 1952, they announced that they had selected the Austin Motor Company (by then part of BMC) and Fisher & Ludlow (which also became part of BMC in September 1953, later operating under the name Pressed Steel Fisher), both English companies based in Birmingham, England, and vicinity. Fisher & Ludlow would produce the bodywork, the mechanicals would be provided, and the Austin Motor Company would perform the final assembly. This was the first time an American-designed car was exclusively marketed in North America and had been entirely built in Europe. It became a captive import – a foreign-built vehicle sold and serviced by Nash (and later by American Motors) through its dealer distribution system. It is believed that Austin completed the first pre-production prototype on 2 December 1952. Austin Motors built five pre-production prototypes and tested them before production began. The total tooling cost amounted to US$1,018,475.94 (Austin: US$197,849.14; Fisher & Ludlow: US$820,626.80), a fraction of the tooling cost for a U.S.-built vehicle.

The styling for all Nash vehicles was then an amalgam of designs from Pinin Farina and his design house of Italy, and the in-house Nash design team. The Nash models, from the Ambassador to the Metropolitan, utilized similar design features, including fully enclosed front wheels, notched "pillow" style door pressing, bar-style grille, etc.

The new Metropolitan was made in two body designs: convertible and hardtop. All came with several standard features that were optional on most cars of the era. Among these factory-installed customer benefits were a map light, electric windshield wipers, a cigar lighter, and even a "continental-type" rear-mounted spare tire with cover. To give the interior a "luxury" image, "Bedford cord" upholstery trimmed with leather was used (similar to larger Nash vehicles). An AM radio, "Weather Eye" heater, and whitewall tires were offered as optional extras for the U.S. market. (It is unlikely that a Metropolitan could have been purchased without a heater and radio, as all vehicles left the factory with both items fitted.)

The Metropolitan was the first postwar American car that was marketed specifically to women. The Dodge La Femme was introduced one year later. The first spokesperson for the car was Miss America 1954, Evelyn Ay Sempier. The car was prominently advertised in Women's Wear Daily. American Motors' marketing brochures described the new model as "America's entirely new kind of car" (1955), "Luxury in Miniature" (1959), and "crafted for personal transportation" (1960).

== First reviews ==
Compared with the typical American car of the 1950s, the Metropolitan was considered "remarkably nimble" by many early testers, and "the consensus is that the Metropolitan isn't just fun to look at, it's fun to drive too." Owners of the cars reported that the "Metropolitan is a good thing in a small package".

Automotive industry veteran and the largest publisher of automotive books at the time, Floyd Clymer, took several Metropolitans through his tests. He "abused" a 1954 Metropolitan convertible and "got the surprise of my life" when its "performance was far better than I expected", that he "felt very safe in the car", and that "it may well be that Nash has started a new trend in American motoring. Perhaps the public is now getting ready to accept a small car". Clymer also took a 1957 Metropolitan hardtop through a grueling 2,912 mi (4,686 km) road test that even took him 14,100 feet (4,298 m) up Pikes Peak. He summed up his experience that "I can not praise the Metropolitan too highly. It is a fascinating little car to drive, its performance is far better than one would expect, and the ride is likewise more than expected".

According to Collectible Auto magazine, the car was described in Car Life's review as "a big car in miniature" that was "fun to drive" and "ideal for a second car in the family," while Motor Trend was not alone in regarding the rear "utility" seat as "a joke".

Motor Trend praised the car's economy: its test Metropolitan returned:

39.4 mpg_{‑US} (6 L/100 km; 47 mpg_{‑imp}) at 45 mph (72 km/h),
27.4 mpg_{‑US} (9 L/100 km; 33 mpg_{‑imp}) at 60 mph (97 km/h), and
30.1 mpg_{‑US} (8 L/100 km; 36 mpg_{‑imp}) "in traffic".

Mechanix Illustrated editor Tom McCahill wrote: "It is not a sports car by the weirdest torturing of the imagination but it is a fleet, sporty little bucket which should prove just what the doctor ordered for a second car, to be used either for a trip to the movies or for a fast run to a penicillin festival." He added that it was a "nice-handling car with plenty of control and amazing dig, considering it is powered by a small Austin A-40 engine" and that the finish was "very nice", although having no trunk opening except by pulling down the back of the rear seat "poses a problem". His test car accelerated from 0 to 60 mph in 19.3 seconds and could exceed 70 mph (113 km/h).

A Road & Track road test recorded acceleration from 0–60 mph in 22.4 seconds, "almost half of the VW's 39.2". However, the magazine noted that at 60 mph (97 km/h), a typical American cruising speed at the time, the Metropolitan was revving at 4300 rpm, which shortened engine life, whereas the Volkswagen could travel at the same speed at only 3000 rpm. Road & Track's testers also said that the car had "more than its share of roll and wallow on corners" and there was "little seat-of-the-pants security when the rear end takes its time getting back in line".

Road Test magazine wrote in 1954 that "on roadability and responsive handling, the Met shines. It also offers easy maintenance and downright stinginess when it comes to gasoline consumption. Also, it's literally a brute for punishment. On several occasions I took familiar corners at speeds half again what I would dare to use in some cars of twice the weight – proof that proper weight distribution, low center of gravity and well engineered suspension have more to do with roadability than massiveness, weight and long wheelbases. Admittedly, the short wheelbased Met does pitch moderately on very rough roads, but the sensitivity and ease of steering make driving a pleasure."

== Production for U.S. ==
=== Series I ===
Series I
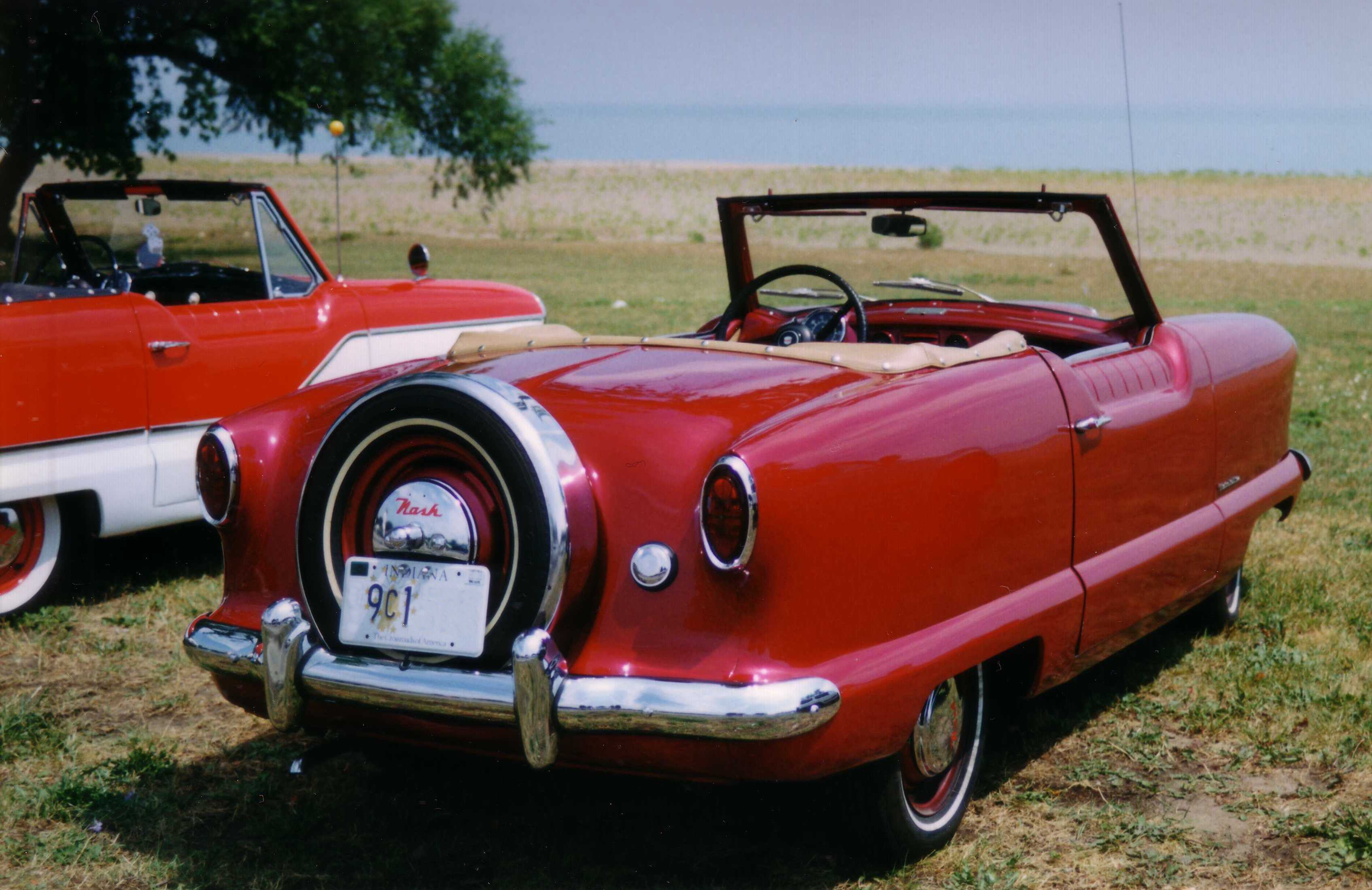

Overview
- Production: 1953–54

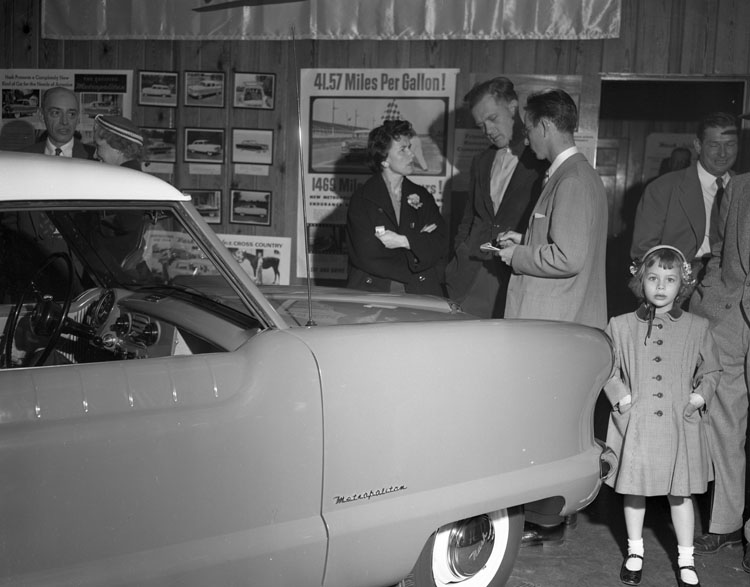
Nash dealership with a Metropolitan visible, 1954

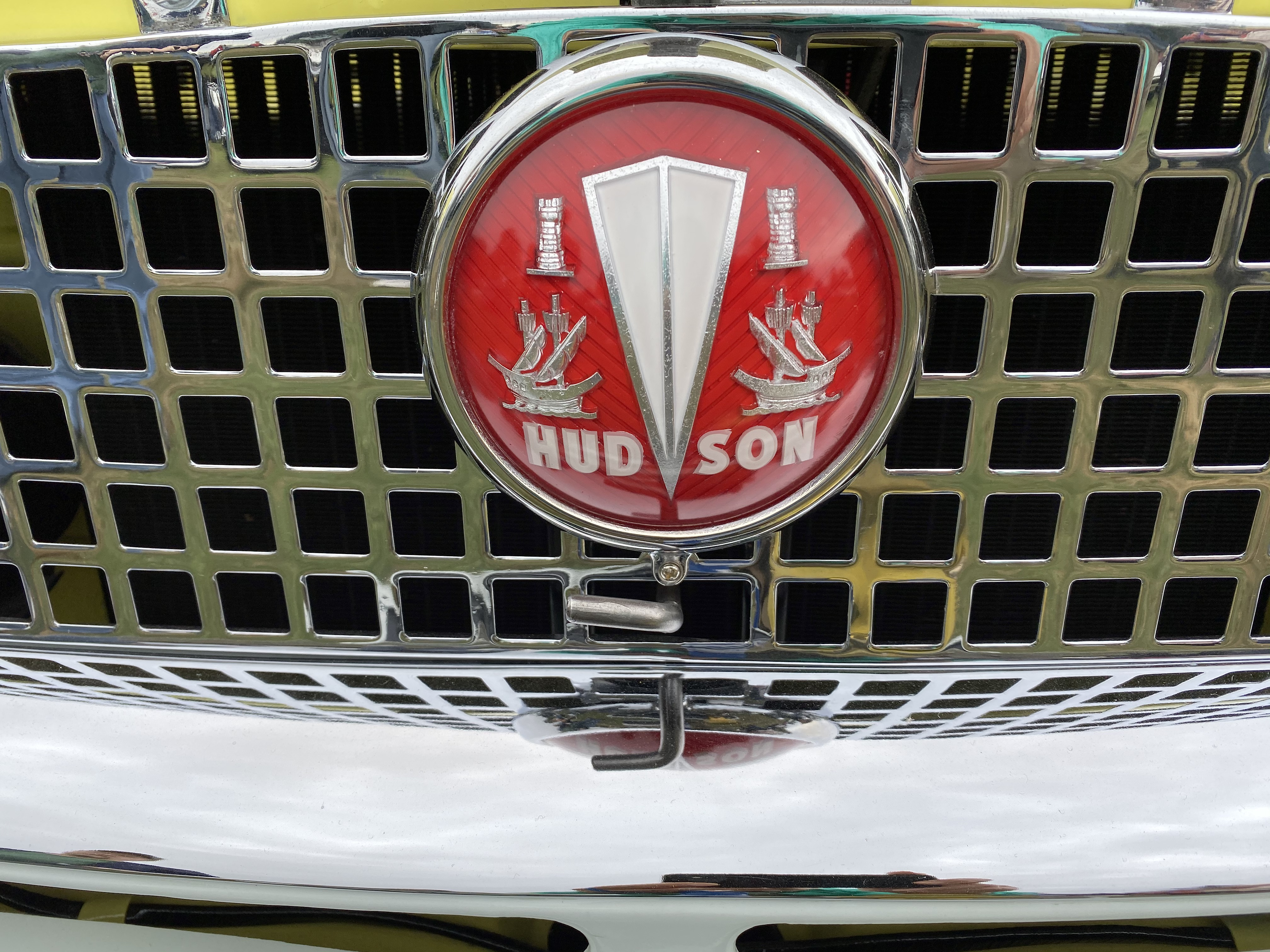
Hudson emblem on Metropolitan grille

Production at Austin's Longbridge factory started in October 1953 (Commencing VIN1001). Nicknamed the "baby Nash", the cars were tiny compared to the standard domestic models at that time. They had an 85 in (2,159 mm) wheelbase, an overall length of 149.5 in (3,797 mm), and a gross weight of 1,785 lb (810 kg) for the convertible and 1,825 lb (828 kg) for the hardtop, thus making the Metropolitan smaller than the Volkswagen Beetle. The two models, a convertible and a hardtop, were powered by the OHV 1,200 cc (73 cu in) straight-4 Austin 'A40' series engine (as used in the Austin A40 Devon/Dorset) driving the rear wheels through a three-speed manual transmission. The initial order was for 10,000 units, with the option for Nash to increase it if sales were sufficient.

The new car underwent rigorous testing at the Nash Proving Grounds, but the first assignment for newly hired Assistant Technical Advisor, Carl Chakmakian, was to conduct supervised testing to achieve advertising and sales training objectives. In December 1953, two new NKI-branded (serial numbers 1009 and 1013) were driven 800 miles (1,287 km) from their arrival port to the new Raleigh Speedway in North Carolina to conduct two days of speed endurance and fuel economy evaluation. The tests were run and certified by NASCAR officials that included Bill France. With two drivers from Shreveport, Louisiana, Roxy Dancey and Herschel Buchanan, one car finished the 24-hour endurance run achieving 1,469.7 mi (2,365 km) at an average speed of 61.2 mph (98 km/h) and 21.1 mpg_{‑US} (11.1 L/100 km; 25.3 mpg_{‑imp}) overall. It had eleven pit stops to change drivers, add fuel and oil, and make tire changes because of the track's abrasive aggregate surface and fast corners. The car did not need any service or parts other than the tires. The second car was subjected to a non-stop 24-hour fuel economy test with drivers changing every three hours while the car was in motion, and refueling was also accomplished in motion three times by attaching a gas can to the side window drained into the car's tank. The car averaged 41.7 mpg_{‑US} (5.64 L/100 km; 50.1 mpg_{‑imp}).

The new model was initially to be called the "NKI Custom", but the name was changed to "Metropolitan" just two months before its public release. New chrome nameplates with the "Metropolitan" name were made to fit into the same holes as the "NKI Custom" script on the passenger side front fender. Nash dealers had to rebadge the early cars that came with the "NKI Custom" name. Still, some factory manuals had already been prepared and distributed to service departments with the NKI name. The first examples badged as Nash went on sale on 19 March 1954 in the U.S. and Canada. Autocar said that "at a production rate of less than 400 cars a week ... it was hardly going to be a runaway best seller."

In surveys, Americans had affirmed a desire for economy cars, but in practice, they bought the Metropolitan in relatively small numbers. Although Nash merged with Hudson in 1954 and marketed the car as a Hudson Metropolitan in 1955, "demand never took off from the original level", primarily because the Metropolitan was slow by North American standards. In the first month of sales, 862 Metropolitans were sold in U.S. and Canada, while in the first six months, a total of 7,042 were sold. A further order by Nash was placed with Austin.

Available exterior colors were P903 "Spruce Green", P904 "Canyon Red", P905 "Caribbean Blue", or P906 "Croton Green", with P907 "Mist Grey" as a contrast color for the hardtops. P906 "Croton Green" was dropped as a color option in April 1954. Cars incorporated the Nash logo on their grille badge, hubcaps, horn button, and spare wheel cover. The suggested retail price (MSRP) for Series I (also known as NK1) models was $1,445 (hardtop) and $1,469 (convertible). Adding a radio and a heater pushed the price above $1,500: at the time, the Volkswagen Beetle was priced at $1,425.

In May 1954, Nash-Kelvinator Corporation announced that it had merged with the Hudson Motor Company to form American Motors Corporation (AMC). Thus, by August 1954, Metropolitans became available through Hudson dealers. These Hudson Metropolitans carried a Hudson grille badge, hubcaps incorporating an "M" logo, a "bulls-eye" horn button design, and a plain spare wheel cover. Braking performance was 90 ft (27.4 m) from 45 mph (72 km/h) to a complete stop.

=== Series II ===
Series II
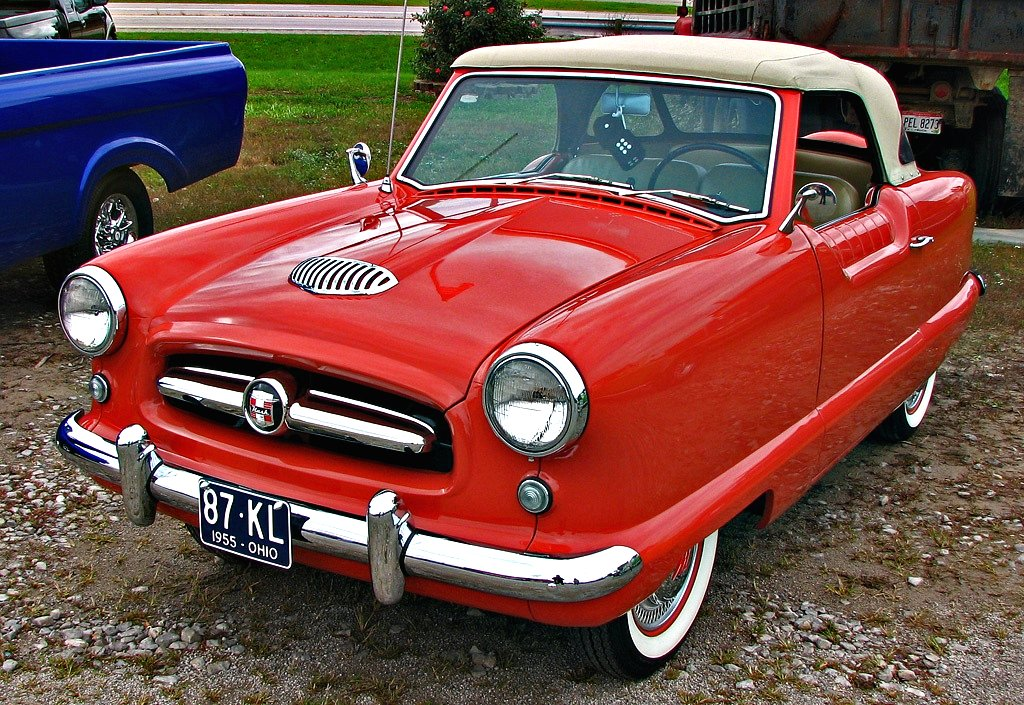

Overview
- Production: 1955

After the first 10,000 cars were built, the engine was changed to a B-Series, but still of 1,200 cc (73 cu in), (as used in the Austin A40 Cambridge). Other modifications included a new gearbox and hydraulic actuation for the clutch (Series I models used a mechanical clutch linkage). The change to a new engine and gearbox added 50 pounds (23 kg) to the car's weight. This model is referred to as Series II or NK2 (Commencing with Vehicle identification number (VIN) E11001 on 19 August 1954).

=== Series III ===
Series III
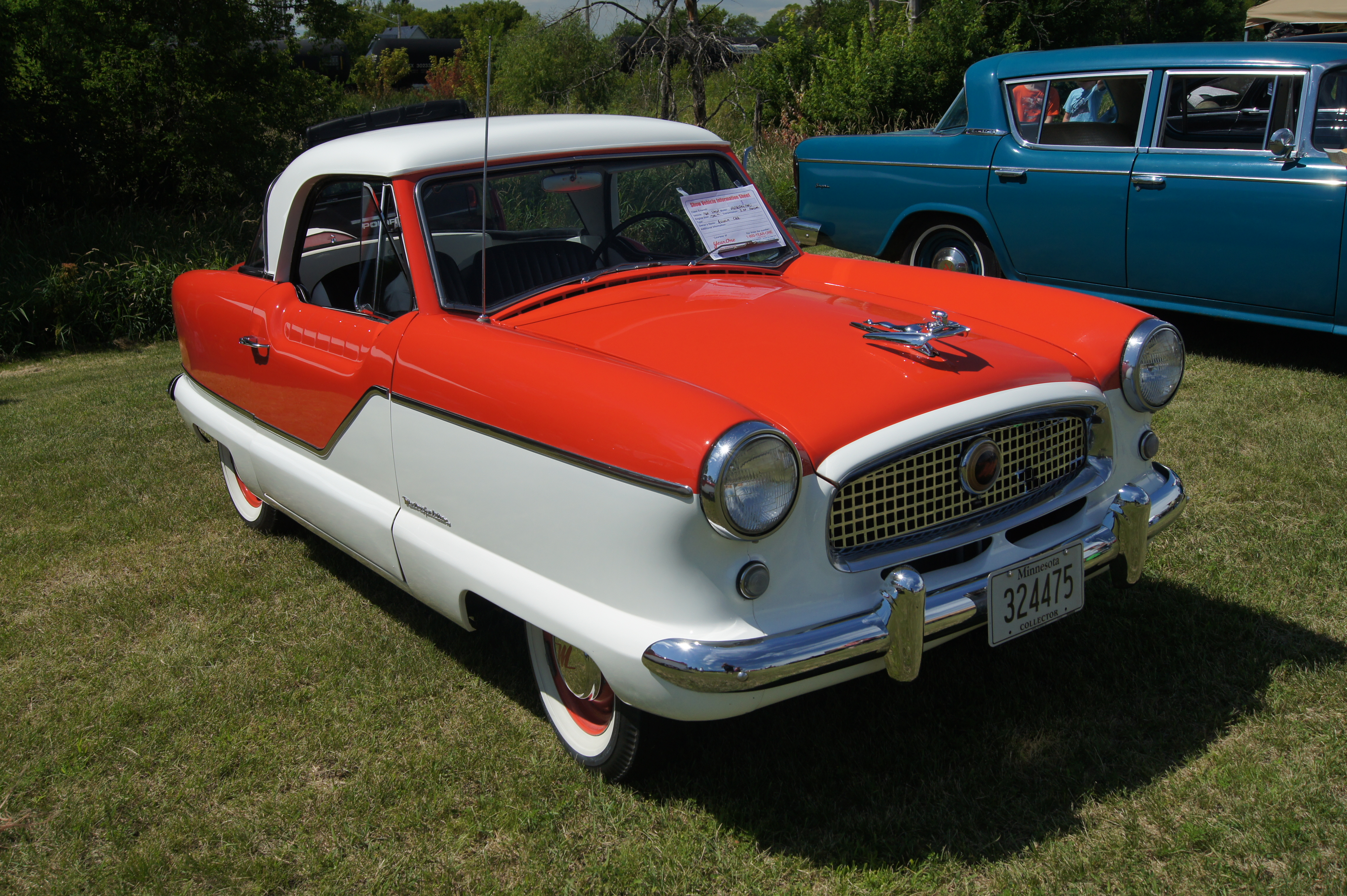

Overview
- Production: 1955–58

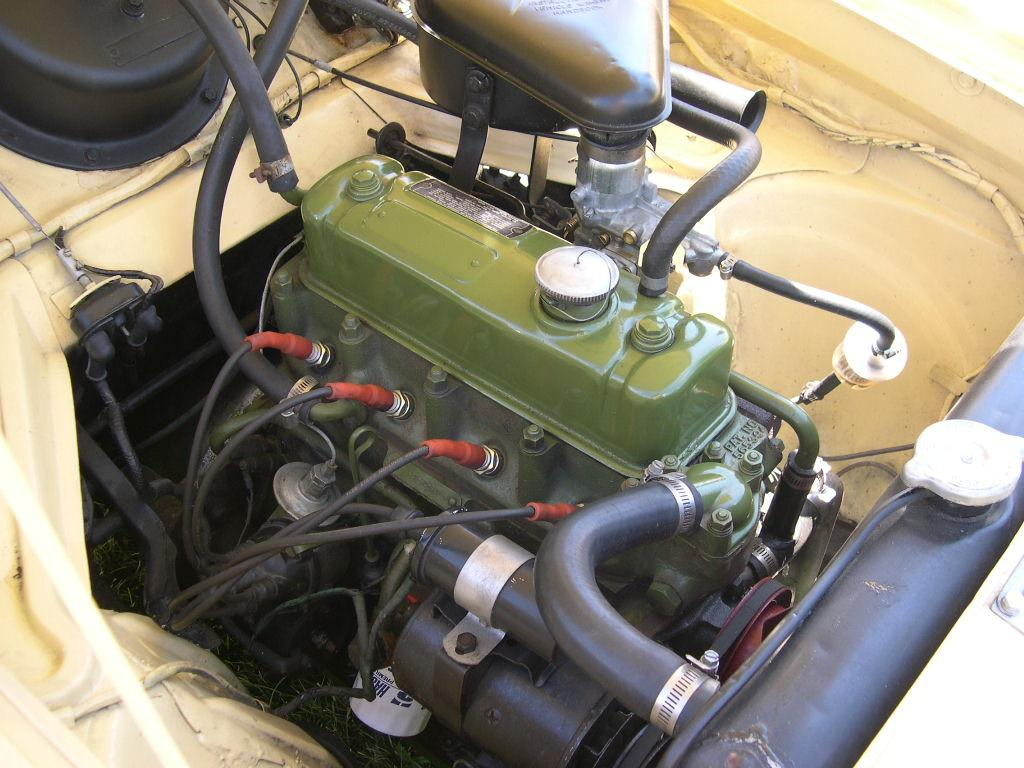
Series 3 1500 engine

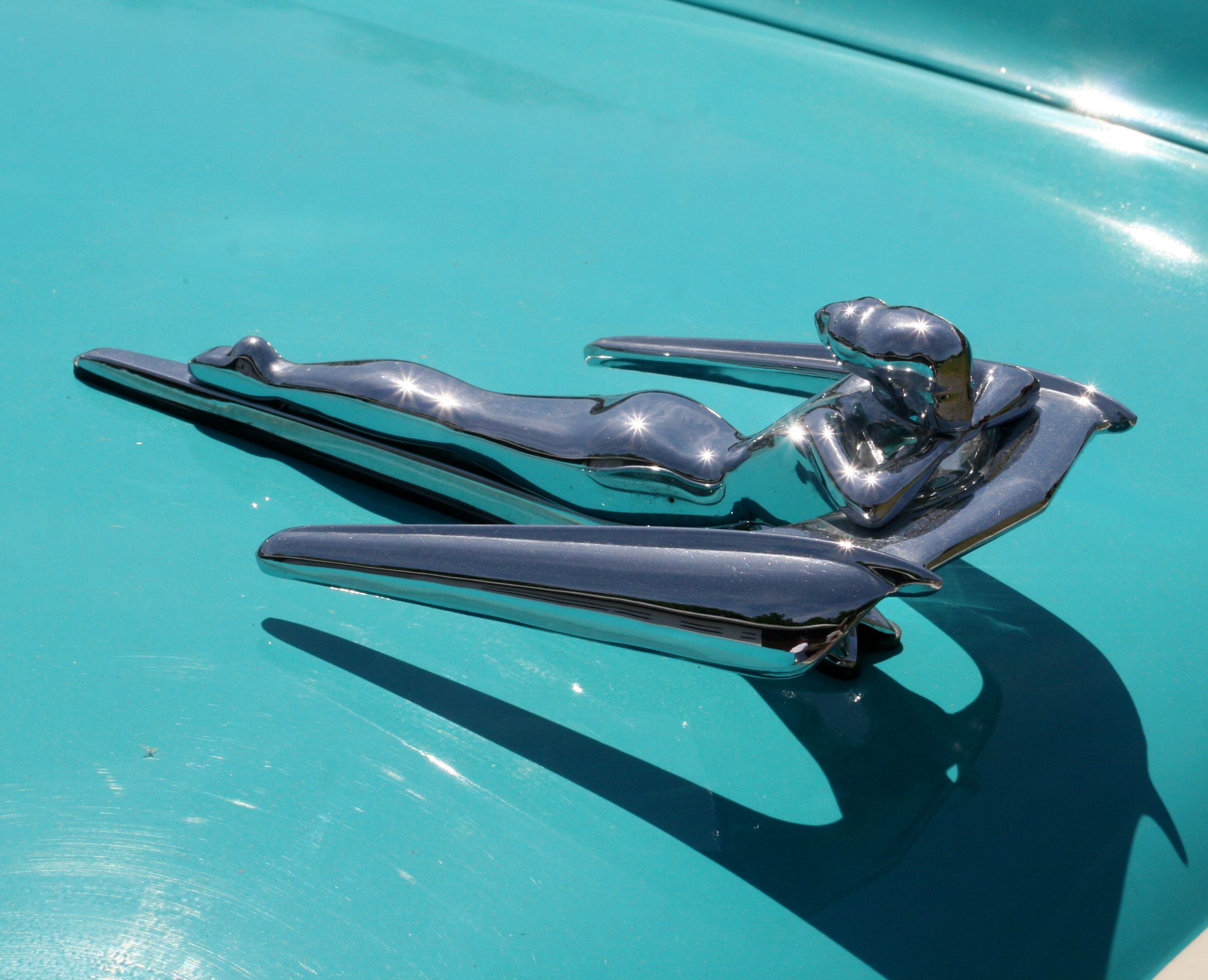
Series 3 hood ornament

November 1955 saw the start of Metropolitan Series III (NK3) production (Commencing with VIN E21008 on 28 November 1955). The design also included the B-Series engine increase in capacity to 1,489 cc (91 cu in) (as used in the Austin A50 Cambridge). Polished stainless steel sweep-spears on the body sides allowed a new two-tone finish to be incorporated, which had the cosmetic effect of lowering, slimming, and lengthening the car. The new exterior colors were P905 "Caribbean Green", P910 "Sunburst Yellow", and P911 "Coral Red" with P909 "Snowberry White" as a contrast. The grille was also redesigned, and the hood had its non-functional hood scoop removed. American Motors changed the designation to "Metropolitan 1500" to differentiate it from the earlier 1,200 cc (73 cu in) models. The interior was also changed to incorporate a "houndstooth" check material for the seats trimmed with white vinyl. The dashboard was also painted black, rather than the body color, just like the Series I and II Metropolitans.

The MSRP for Series III models was $1,527 (hardtop) and $1,551 (convertible). After VIN E35133 (16 April 1957), the exterior colors were changed to P910 "Sunburst Yellow", P912 "Berkshire Green", and P913 "Mardi-Gras Red" with P914 "Frost White" as a contrast. After VIN E45912 (9 January 1958), the color P910 "Sunburst Yellow" was replaced by P915 "Autumn Yellow" and P908 "Classic Black" was added to the available exterior colors.

In September 1957, AMC announced the discontinuation of the historic Nash and Hudson brand names. The Metropolitan was subsequently marketed under the "Metropolitan" name only and sold through Rambler dealers. The Nash and Hudson Grille medallions were believed to have been discontinued around October 1956 (VIN E28326); they were replaced with the "M" style grille medallion.

=== Series IV ===
Series IV
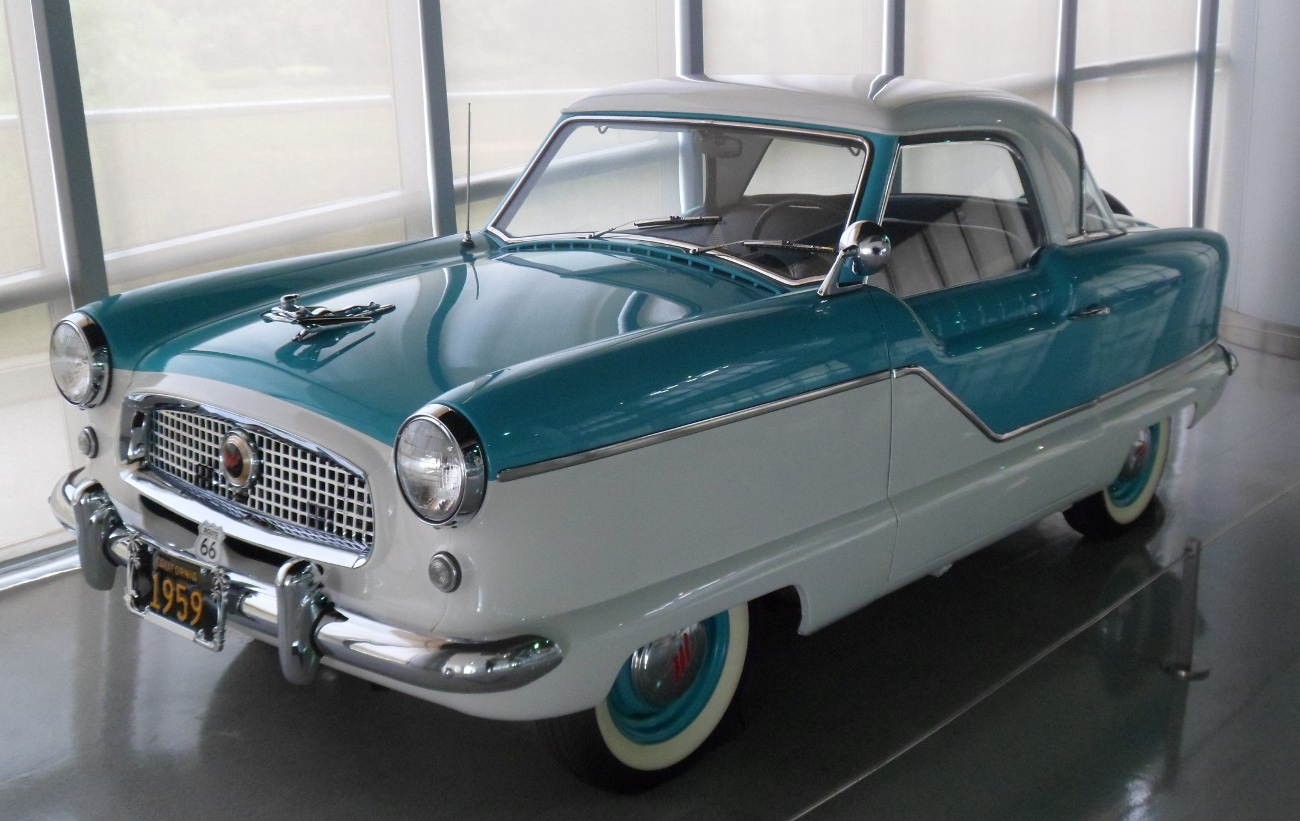
- 1959 Nash Metropolitan on display at the Shanghai Auto Museum

Overview
- Production: 1959–61

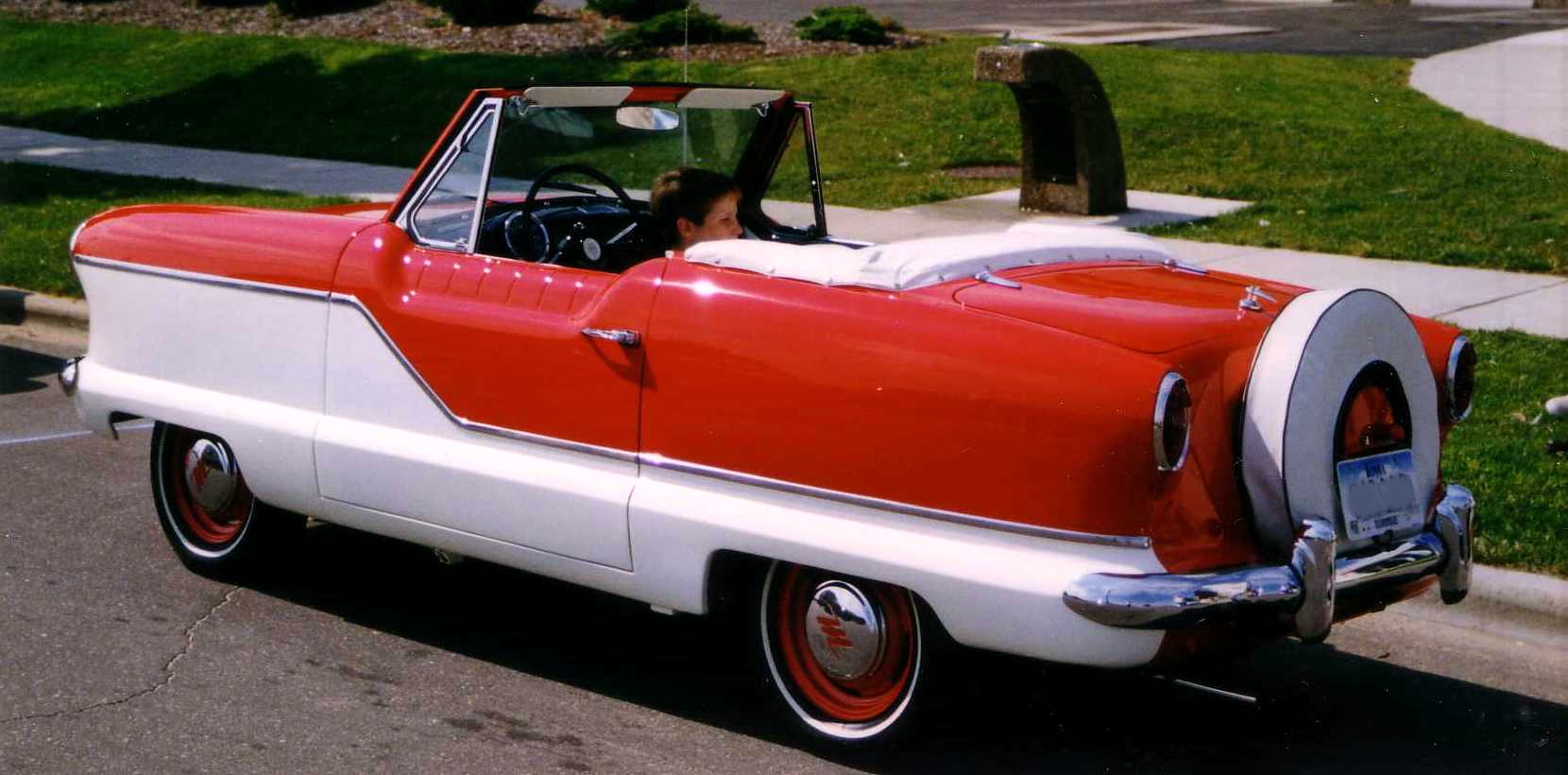
Rear view of the Series IV

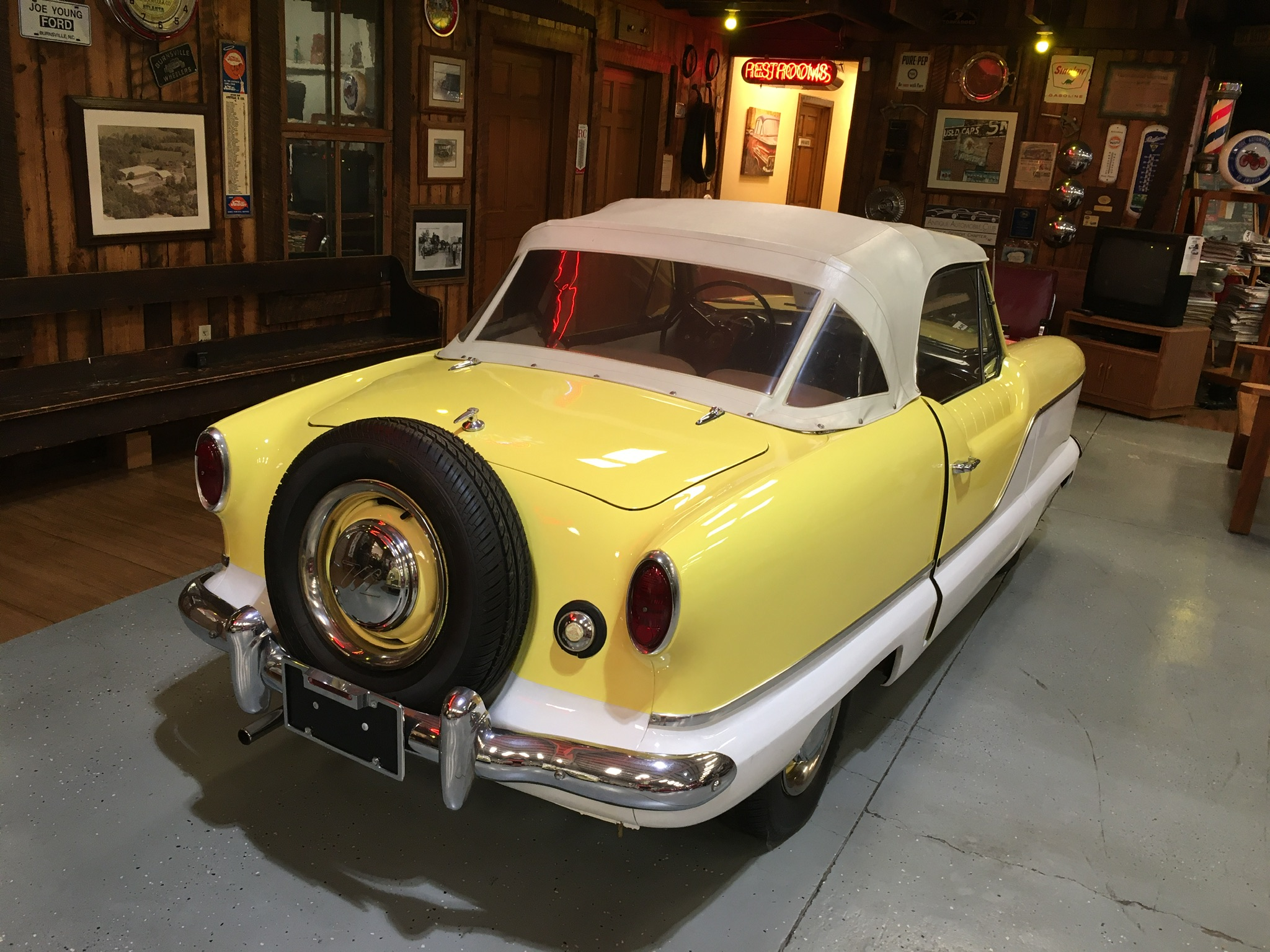
Rear view of the Series IV

January 1959 saw the start of Metropolitan Series IV (NK4) production (Commencing with VIN E59048 on 12 January 1959). This major redesign saw the addition of an external decklid (previous models only allowed access to the trunk through the rear seatback), one-piece rear window, and vent windows. By this time, the engine had been upgraded by increasing the compression ratio from 7.2:1 to 8.3:1 (Commenced VIN E43116 — 15 October 1957), rated at 55 bhp (41 kW) (as used in the Austin A55 Cambridge). The additional features added 15 lb (7 kg) to the weight. Exterior color options were the same as for Series III. The interior used a diamond pattern for the seats, with white vinyl trim. The MSRP for Series IV models was $1,672.60 (hardtop) and $1,696.80 (convertible).

Sales rose to 22,209 units in 1959, the Metropolitan's best-selling year, promoting it to second place behind Volkswagen in sales of cars imported to the U.S. American Motors' advertising made much of this ranking while not mentioning that the Volkswagen Beetle outsold the Metropolitan by 5 1/2 to 1.

For the 1960 model year, American Motors prepared a Metropolitan convertible for the Easter Parade in New York City. Named the "Metropolitan Fifth Avenue", the car was finished with 15 hand-rubbed coats of pearl-pink lacquer outside and featured pink-and-white cowhide upholstery and pink fur carpeting. Rear fender sides had Fifth Avenue lettering while the front fenders featured triangular badges that combined American and British flags. The car was filled with large plush bunnies that were given away every hour. The Fifth Avenue was displayed on the 1960 auto show circuit and ultimately sold to an AMC dealer in Boston. Three other Metropolitan convertibles were prepared with unique region-inspired features by AMC's styling department: "Westerner", "Cape Cod", and the "Royal Runabout" a black-and-gold one-off built for and presented to Britain's Princess Margaret.

Production ceased in April 1961 (final VIN — E95981, built 19 April 1961). Sales of the existing inventory continued until March 1962.

Approximately 95,000 Metropolitans were sold in the United States and Canada, making it one of the top-selling cars to be imported into those countries at the time, and its sales in 1959 helped to spur the introduction of the Big Three (General Motors, Ford, and Chrysler) new compact models.

=== Yearly shipments ===
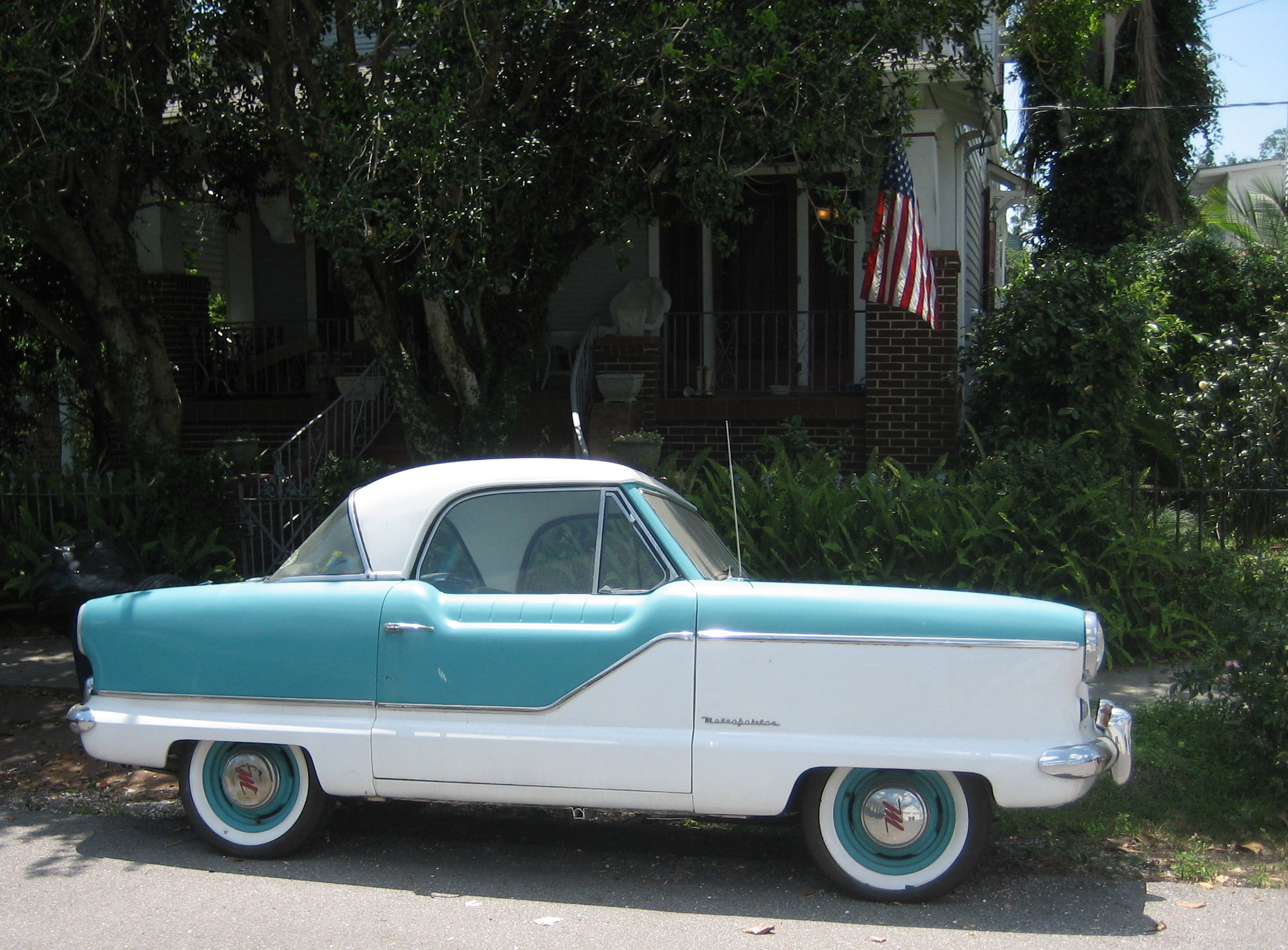
Metropolitan coupe

Year	US	Canada	Total
1953	571	172	743
1954	11,198	1,964	13,162
1955	3,849	2,247	6,096
1956	7,645	1,423	9,068
1957	13,425	1,892	15,317
1958	11,951	1,177	13,128
1959	20,435	1,774	22,209
1960	13,103	771	13,874
1961	853	116	969
1962	412	8	420
Totals	83,442	11,544	94,986

=== Production dates ===
To establish the production date for a Metropolitan (U.S. and Canadian models only), check the VIN or Serial number on a data plate affixed to the firewall. Chassis numbers after 4781 are prefixed by the letter "E". The number on the list below can provide an approximate production date. NB. Since the cars took at least six weeks to be shipped from the Longbridge factory to the U.S. distribution network, the actual titled date will be different from the production date.

Starting VIN by Year and Month
Month	1953	1954	1955	1956	1957	1958	1959	1960	1961
Jan.	-	1771	E14997	E21127	E30260	E45541	E58631	E80930	E94599
Feb.	-	2797	E15628	E21606	E31481	E47003	E59384	E82828	E94852
Mar.	-	3884	E16406	E22175	E32766	E48370	E60743	E84429	E95306
Apr.	-	E5060	E17312	E22826	E34157	E49418	E62310	E86458	E95870
May	-	E6264	E18095	E23557	E35760	E50057	E64459	E88307	-
June	-	E7678	E18972	E24435	E37654	E51255	E65904	E90274	-
July	-	E9096	E19502	E25368	E39060	E52201	E68322	E91579	-
Aug.	-	E10430	E19945	E26022	E40282	E53258	E70426	E92291	-
Sept	-	E11331	E20189	E26652	E40766	E54060	E72235	E92983	-
Oct.	1001	E12426	E20474	E27526	E42139	E55306	E74795	E93571	-
Nov.	1066	E13597	E20717	E28431	E43399	E56556	E76745	E93947	-
Dec.	1271	E14259	E20940	E29463	E44464	E57685	E78833	E94354	-

=== Station wagon proposals ===
A drawing attributed to Richard Arbib, dated 17 January 1956, shows a Metropolitan station wagon with room to accommodate an adult-sized second-row seat. It also features a glass roof panel and a body with sharp edges and a tailfin.

A distributor at the base exchange in Okinawa, Japan, converted a hardtop Met into a "delivery wagon" by removing the rear window and adding a plastic shell from the roof over the rear deck.

American Motors contemplated a four-seat station wagon version. Two prototypes were designed by AMC in Detroit. Pinin Farina built one in Italy and the second was finished in-house by AMC. Both were on the existing platform, but addressed the dissatisfaction among dealers with the Met's small cabin. The concepts were displayed at car shows and indicated sales potential. However, the Met project was abandoned as product planners indicated lower production volume and profitability compared to reintroducing the two-door Nash Rambler line.

The Pinin Farina prototype has been restored and is on display at a Metropolitan restoration facility in California. It features a wide, bright trim-covered B-pillar with a slim D-pillar for its flat roof line, and an opening rear window with a down-hinged tailgate.

== International markets ==
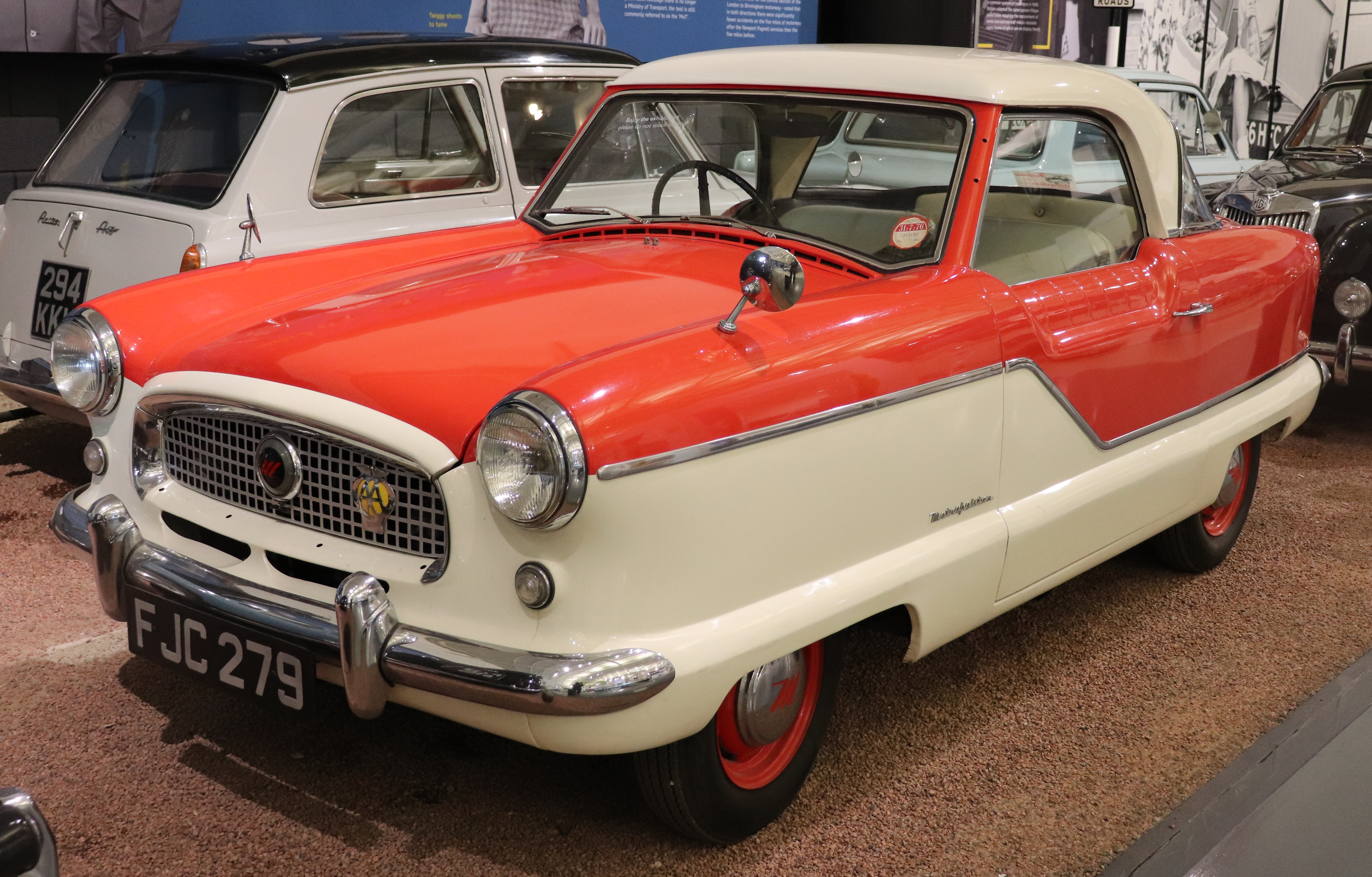
1958 right-hand drive convertible Austin Metropolitan

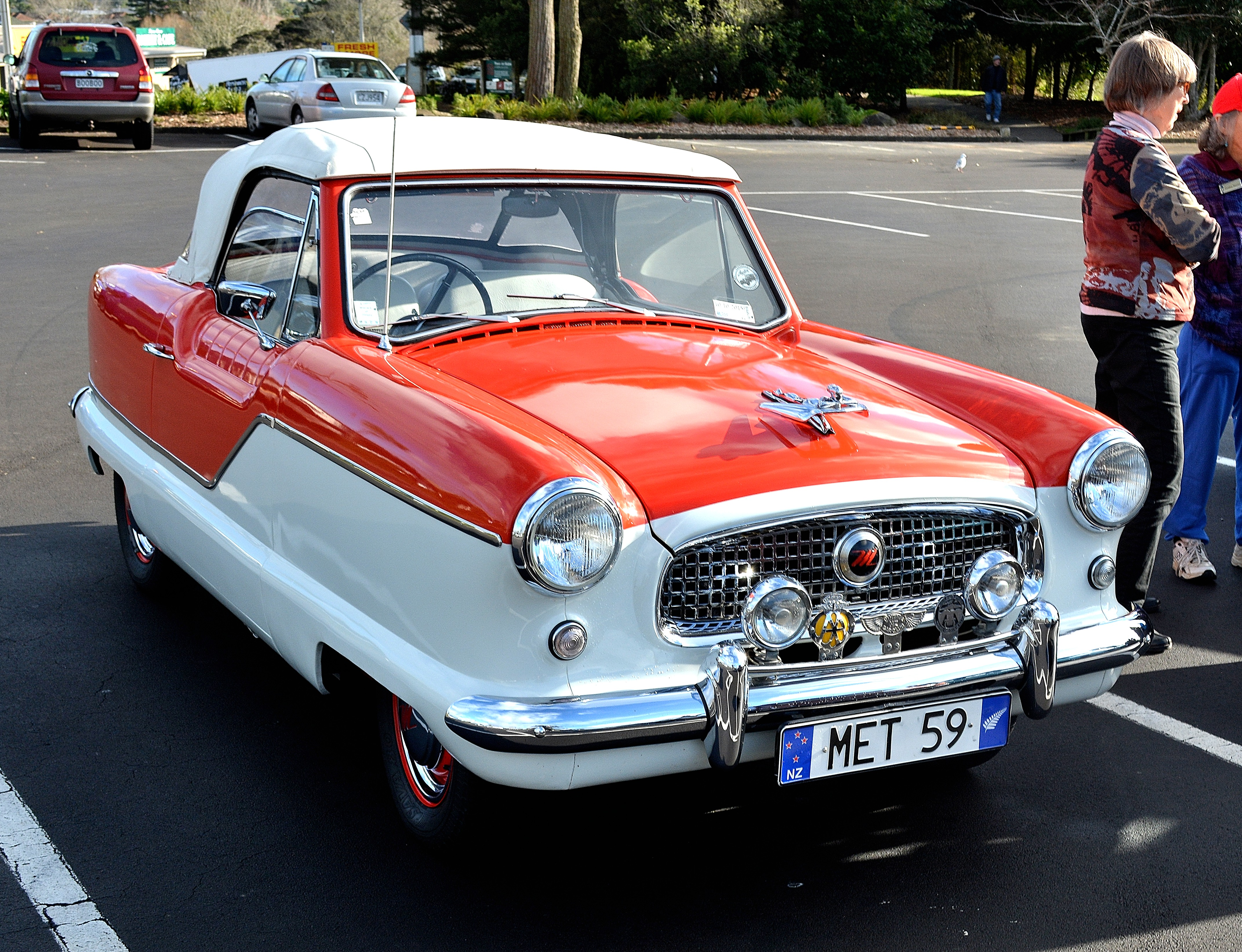
1959 New Zealand-new right-hand drive Nash Metropolitan

In October 1956, Austin Motor Company obtained permission from American Motors to sell the Metropolitans in overseas countries where AMC did not have a presence. The early brochures for the Austin Metropolitans used a reversed photograph to depict a right-hand-drive (RHD) car parked in an English country town (Chipping Campden) since only left-hand-drive vehicles were available when the photos were taken.

From December 1956, production of Austin Metropolitans began, and from 2 April 1957, approximately 9,400 additional units were sold in overseas markets, including the United Kingdom and New Zealand. List prices for the UK Series III models were £713 17s 0d for the hardtop and £725 2s 0d for the convertible. An estimated 1,200 Metropolitans were sold there in four years, according to several published sources. However, one British journalist estimated the figure at around 5,000. Markedly American in styling, the car was considered outlandish compared with the more traditional, British-designed models in the British Motor Corporation lineup.

Only Series III and Series IV Metropolitans were marketed in the UK. However, the first cars sold in the UK were available only to American and Canadian service members stationed there.

Series III models carried the prefix HD6 (convertible) or HE6 (hardtop). Some early Series III models carried the prefix HNK3H or HNK3HL (L=Left-Hand Drive). The prefix is thought to indicate "Home Nash Kelvinator Series 3 H = 1400-1999cc (Metropolitan = 1500cc)". Sales in the Series III in the UK ran from April 1957 until February 1959. The Series IV models, which carried the prefix A-HJ7 (convertible) or A-HP7 (hardtop), were sold from September 1960 through February 1961. The Metropolitan was unavailable for UK sales between February 1959 and September 1960 since all production was destined for U.S. and Canadian dealers. When sales in the UK resumed, the cars were available through Austin dealers at £707 6s 8d for the hardtop and £732 2s 6d for the convertible.

Austin was dropped from the car's name, which became simply "Metropolitan". Although there were no Austin badges, they had Austin Company chassis plates. The model remained known, by trade and public alike, as the Austin Metropolitan, often shortened to Austin Metro in common parlance. British Motor Company (BMC and later, British Leyland) adopted the "Metro" tag as a house name, re-emerging in 1980 on the Austin (mini) Metro.

Metropolitans were sold new in right-hand-drive in New Zealand as Nashes. The models were not available in Australia.

In May 1960, Car Mart (a large Austin dealership in London, UK) presented Princess Margaret as a wedding present with a specially prepared Metropolitan finished in black with gold trim and gold leather interior. It was stolen in London in February 1961.

Due to falling sales, production of the Austin Metropolitan ended in February 1961. Two additional "one-offs" were built in March and April after serial Metropolitan production ended. The final car had a VIN of A-HP7 150301. Total Austin Metropolitan production has been estimated at between 9,384 and 9,391 vehicles.

== Epilogue ==
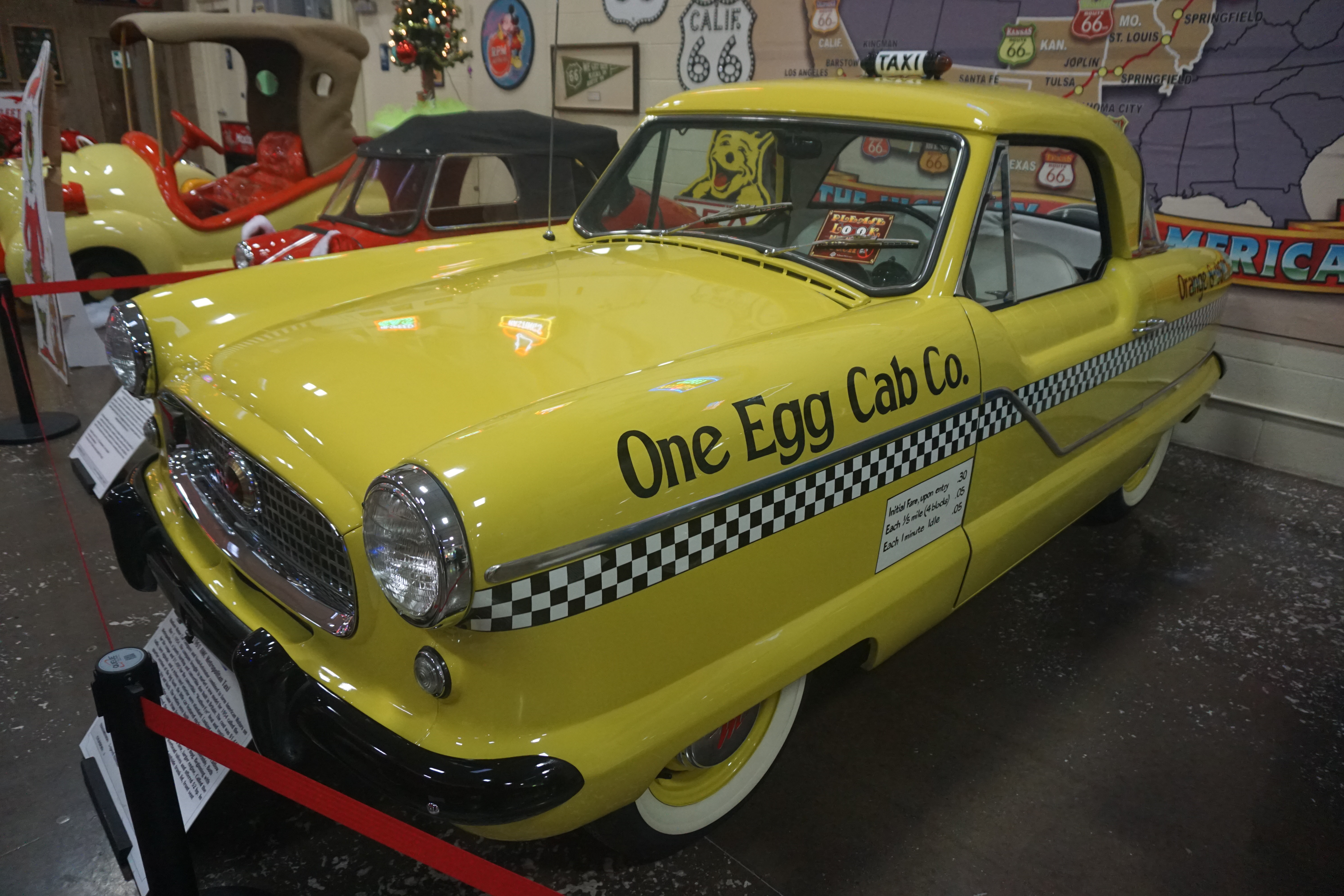
1961 AMC Metropolitan Taxi at Stahls Automotive Collection

The Metropolitan lost market appeal due to increasing competition from AMC's own Rambler American models and newly introduced compact cars from the Big Three. The last Metropolitan body was made by Fisher & Ludlow on 10 April 1961. US-bound Metropolitan production ended in April 1961, as a result of its "marginal sales plus the fact that a four or five-passenger Rambler American could be purchased for only about $100 more".

The Metropolitan "was a car that appealed to an eclectic mix of Americans" because it was "economical, yet a joy to drive," and it has been described as "pure automotive whimsy." It also "swam against nearly every current of American car design."

== Police market ==
AMC marketed right-hand drive models to U.S. police departments for use in parking enforcement and other urban duties. Comparing the car to police motorcycles, an AMC brochure advertised superior all-weather protection, cost-effectiveness and storage space, and also the safety of single-unit construction.

The Franklin Mint produced a die-cast toy model of a 1956 Metropolitan in a police car version. Among its features are a police hat and handcuffs on the passenger's seat, as well as a fire extinguisher on the floor.

== Astra-Gnome ==
Industrial designer Richard Arbib designed the Astra-Gnome "Time and Space Car," a design concept influenced by space travel forms. The vehicle was featured on the 3 September 1956 cover of Newsweek magazine and exhibited at the 1956 New York International Auto Show. Arbib modified a 1955 Nash Metropolitan and it was his vision of what an automobile would look like in the year 2000. Among the features were a "celestial time-zone clock permitting actual flight-type navigation". The car is restored and kept at a museum in California.

== Metropolitan Club (AMC) ==
Almost from the beginning of sales of the Metropolitan, American Motors received many letters and photographs from Metropolitan owners with stories of their good experiences with their cars. Some of these comments were used in later brochures for the Metropolitan. In January 1957, James W. Watson (AMC's Sales Manager for the Metropolitan) initiated a "Metropolitan Club" to channel this enthusiasm and hopefully increase Metropolitan sales. He reasoned that personal recommendation was a powerful marketing tool.

All owners of Metropolitans could apply to join the club, and members received a membership card, membership certificate, and a metal badge to attach to their vehicle. Beginning in May 1957, a magazine called "The Met Letter" was sent out to members. Sixteen issues were produced from May 1957 (Volume 1, Number 1) to January 1962 (Volume 4, Number 3). The magazine consisted of articles and photographs submitted by members, as well as maintenance and editorial comments from American Motors. Members who recruited additional Metropolitan buyers were rewarded with a special gold anodized "Metropolitan Club" badge.

The club was disbanded around May 1962, when the supply of new Metropolitans was exhausted. Floyd Clymer, the motoring journalist and passionate supporter of the Metropolitan concept, attempted to keep the original Metropolitan Club active after that time.

== Legacy ==
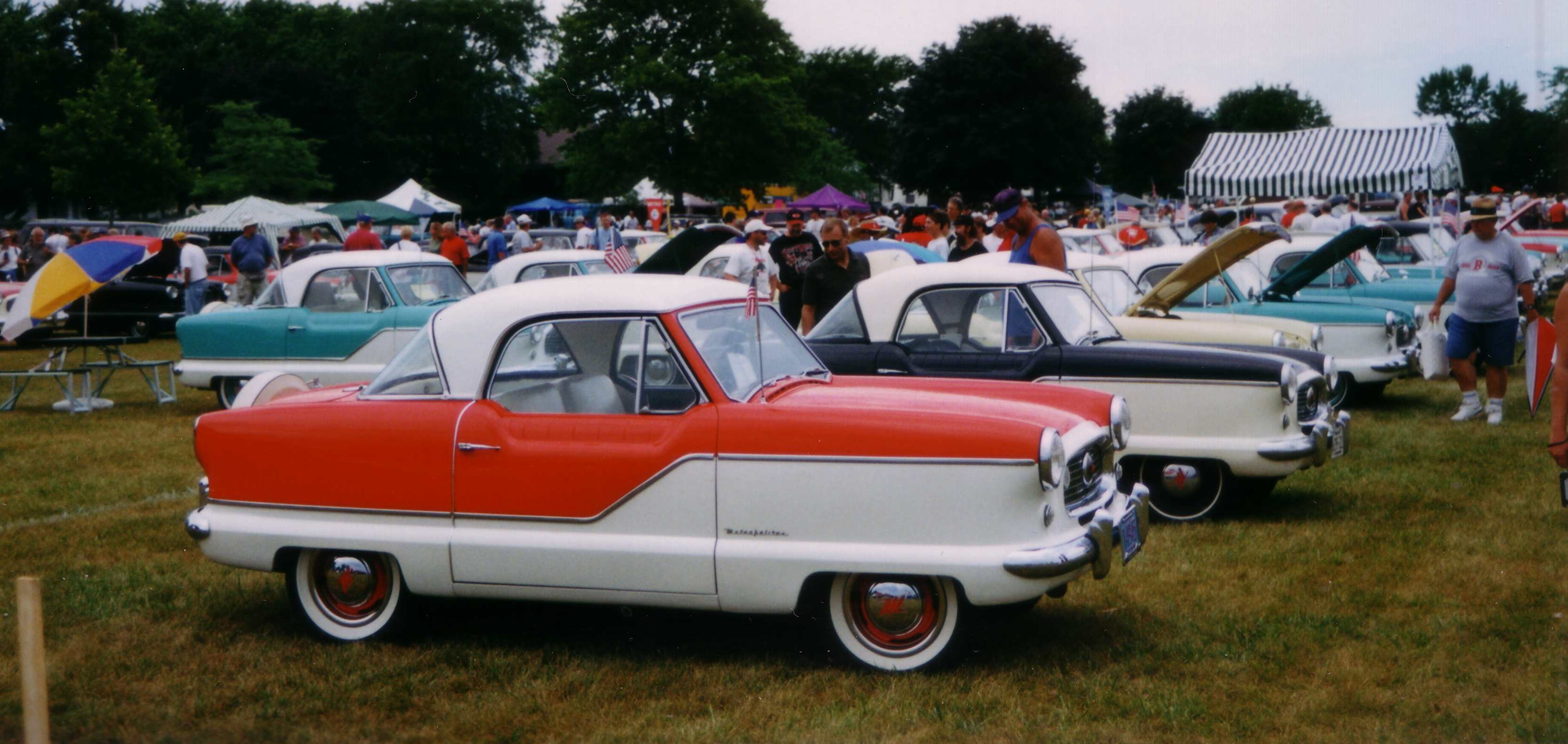
Metropolitan car club meeting

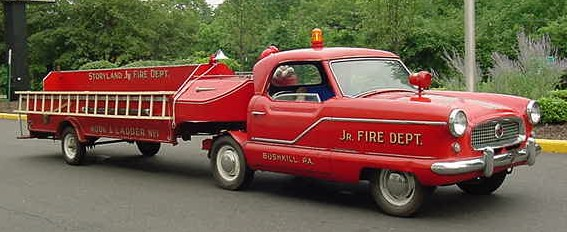
1957 Metropolitan converted into an amusement ladder fire truck

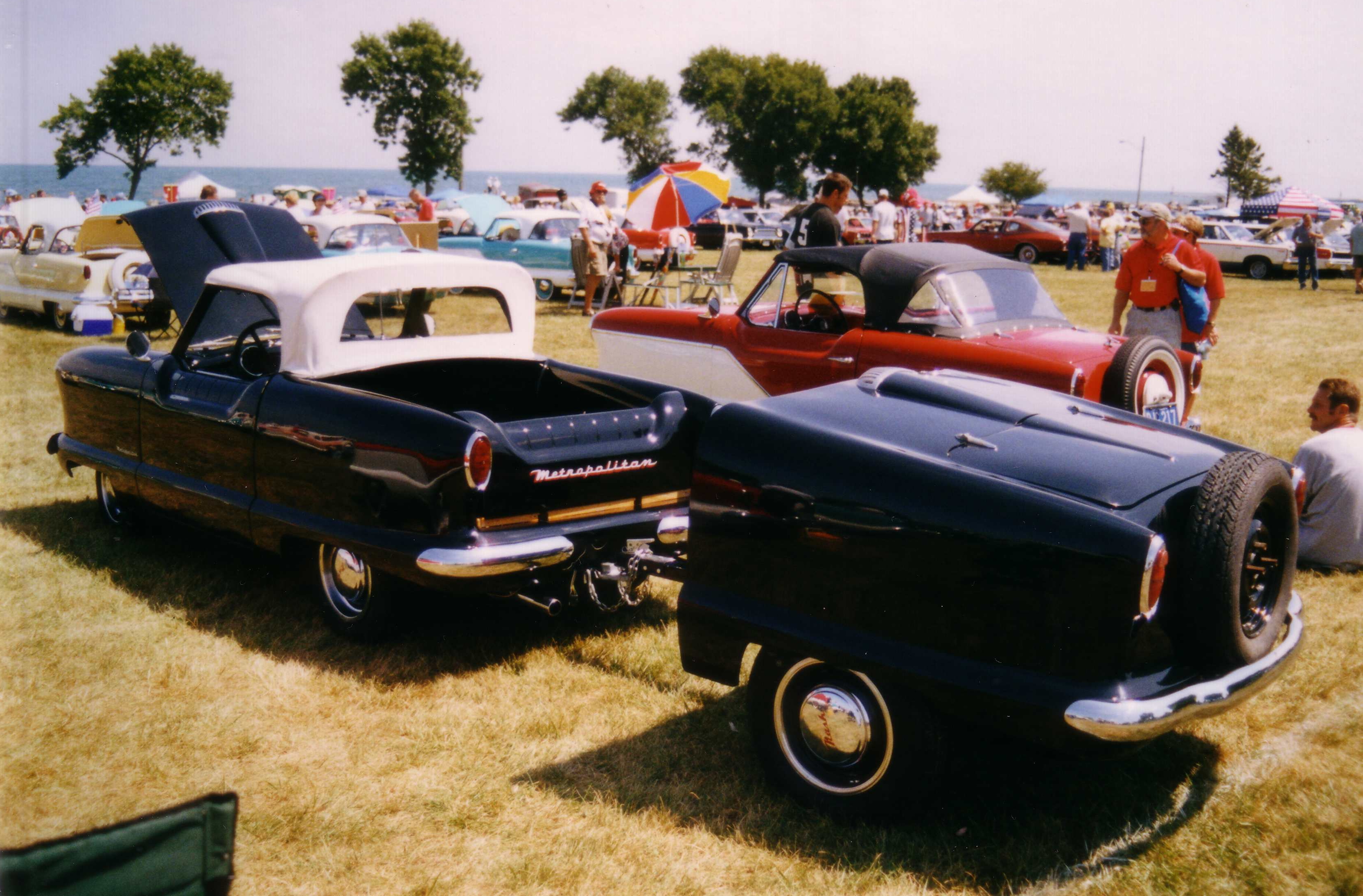
Met conversion pickup with trailer

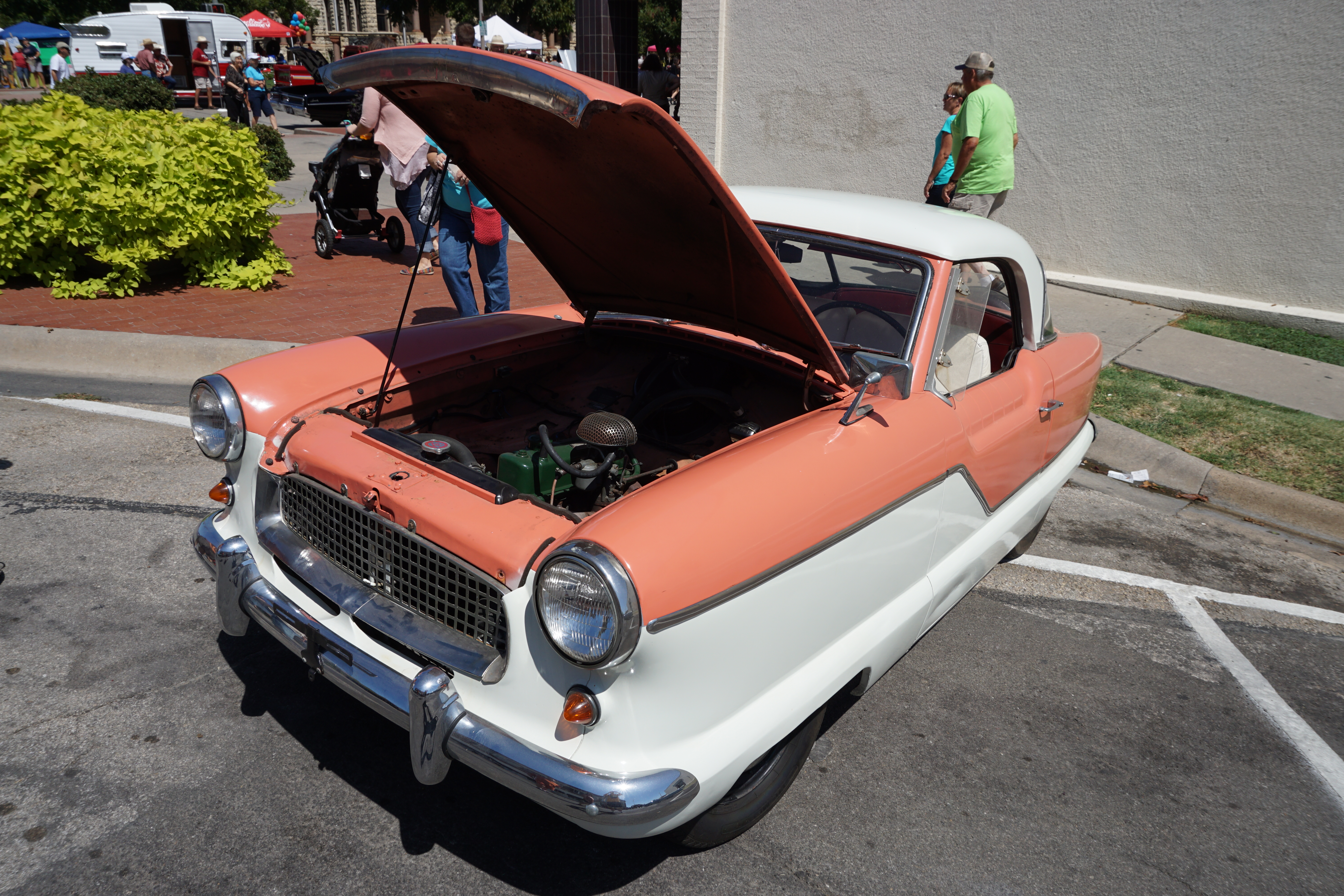
1957 Nash Metropolitan at a car show

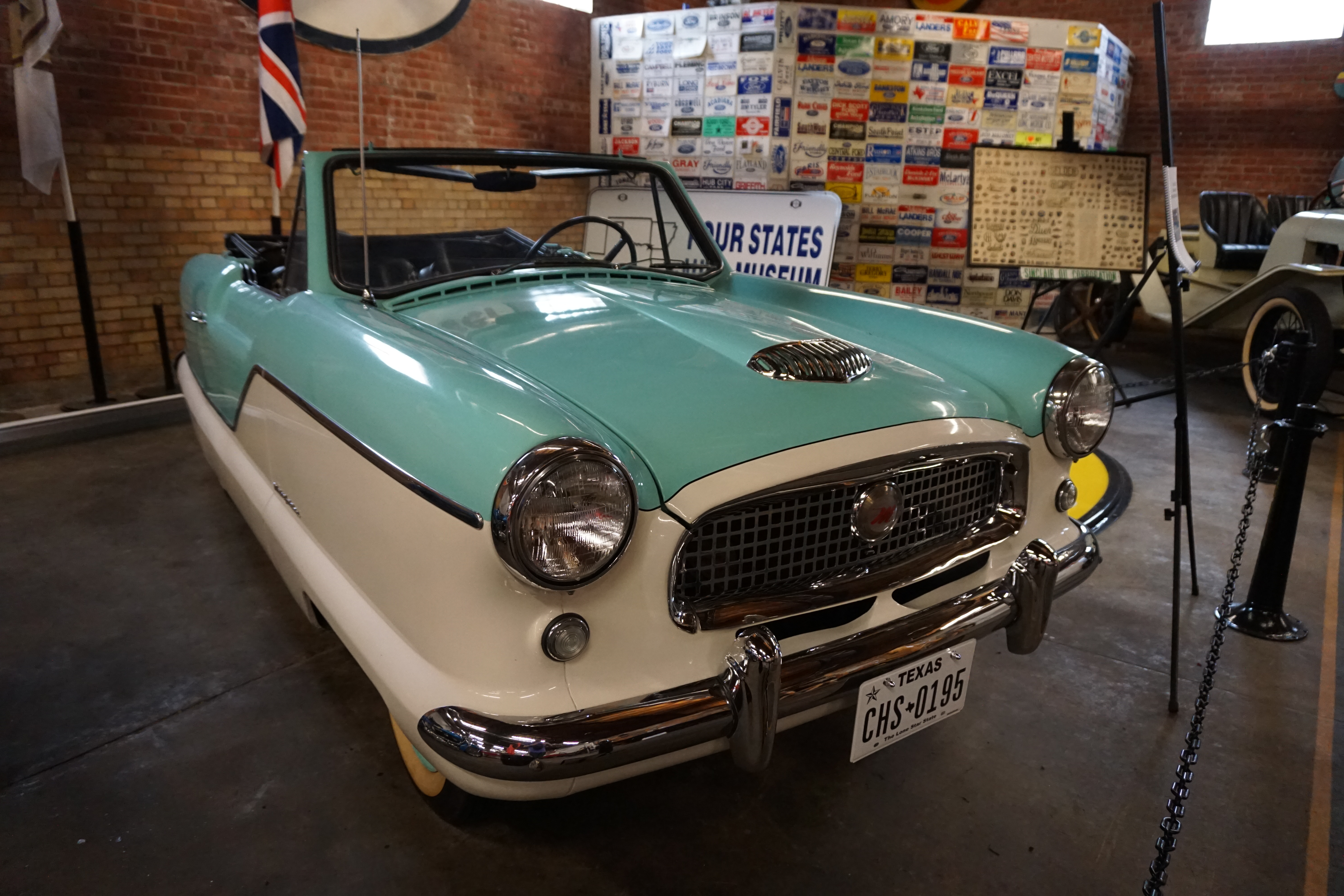
A 1960 Nash Metropolitan at the Four States Auto Museum in Texarkana

The "Metropolitan's staying power and its never-ending cuteness" have earned it "a place among the Greatest Cars of All Time" in the opinion of automotive writer Jack Nerad, a former editor of Motor Trend magazine: "No, the Metropolitan didn't come from a top-of-the-line manufacturer. No, it doesn't have a proud racing history. And, no, it wasn't built in huge numbers. But [it] possesses an ageless, cuddly quality that has made it a perennial favorite of car lovers and car agnostics alike." Nerad added: "If you wanted to ... wring the Met through its paces, you would be rewarded with a 0–60 miles per hour acceleration time of nearly 30 seconds. The Met was reasonably light at approximately 1800 pounds, but that weight was squared off against 42 horsepower."

In the opinion of syndicated auto journalist and author Bill Vance, the 1,200 cc (73 cu in) Metropolitan "was quite a stylish little car" that was "ahead of its time" and performed well against its competition.

Brian Sewell cites the 1,500 cc (92 cu in) version as the one "now perversely recognized as a collector's car". He wrote that the Metropolitan is "worth a moment's consideration, for in the history of the post-war American car industry it was the only genuine attempt to provide the market there with a mass-produced small, cheap car that could hold its own in urban traffic and slot into parking spaces far too small for even the smallest Ford or Chevrolet ... [but] the steering, dreadfully hampered by the enclosure of the front wheels, is so insensitive, and the turning circle so wide, that parking is a wretched business, the slack response of the huge steering-wheel a feature common in lumbering U.S. cars of the period."

By British standards, it looked "awful", according to Autocar, but Nash was "very pleased with it".

In 1961, the British auto magazine The Autocar tested a 1959 model whose odometer showed 27,124 mi (43,652 km), and recorded a "reasonable" cruising speed of 60 mph, "fairly high" oil consumption of 125 miles per pint, "adequately good" road-holding, "pronounced understeer" in cornering, "good directional stability," "decidedly vague steering," a turning circle that was "stately for such a small car," brakes that were "effective," and remarked on the "unnecessarily high position of the steering-wheel," which interfered with the driver's view of the road. The test car accelerated from 0–60 mph in 22.4 seconds, and its time for the standing-start quarter-mile was 21.9 seconds.

Metropolitans have the very soft ride preferred by Americans at the time instead of the firmer suspension preferred in Europe. Markedly American, the styling was considered outlandish compared with the more sober British-styled models in the British Motor Corporation lineup. Brian Sewell commented in 2007 that the car was "damned" in England "as a preposterous aberration incorporating the worst of everything American".

One marque enthusiast says that Nash's subcompact was "the Smart car of the '50s". Although his Metropolitan is unsuitable for long journeys owing to "a lot of wind noise and really poor suspension," it can cruise at 50 mph (80 km/h) and has a top speed of 75 mph (121 km/h). Parts are "relatively easy" to obtain, and the car is "easy to work on".

Ken Gross, a director of the Petersen Automotive Museum, noted that "the softly sprung Met wallows like most larger American cars of its day," and he has warned against "rust, especially in the floor pan and lower fenders," and "electrical gremlins". British-made mechanical parts were available on the unspecified date of his article's publication, but he said that sheet metal was "a challenge".

Sewell advises buying the open version in "as late a model as you can (it ceased production in 1961) – this has slightly more panache, and with the hood down, it's much easier to load [at the supermarket]".

"While there are still good deals to be had on Metropolitans, their values have quietly but sharply escalated in the last five years while other 1960s American collector cars have leveled off or simply remained flat ... Parts and support are not a problem with these cars; returning all the waves and smiles you'll get driving a Met can be tiring."

There are active clubs for Metropolitan owners and enthusiasts. New, used, and reproduction examples of various parts and accessories are available. Some owners modify their Metropolitans. More extreme modifications have included conversion into a pickup truck, station wagon, stretch limousine, and installation of a V8 engine. A conversion into a "Metro-Sled" features a rear-mounted snowmobile engine driving twin tracks. Some cars that were initially hardtops have been converted to convertibles; however, cars built as convertibles had chassis stiffeners as well as a different wedge and secondary catch for the doors.

== Notable owners ==
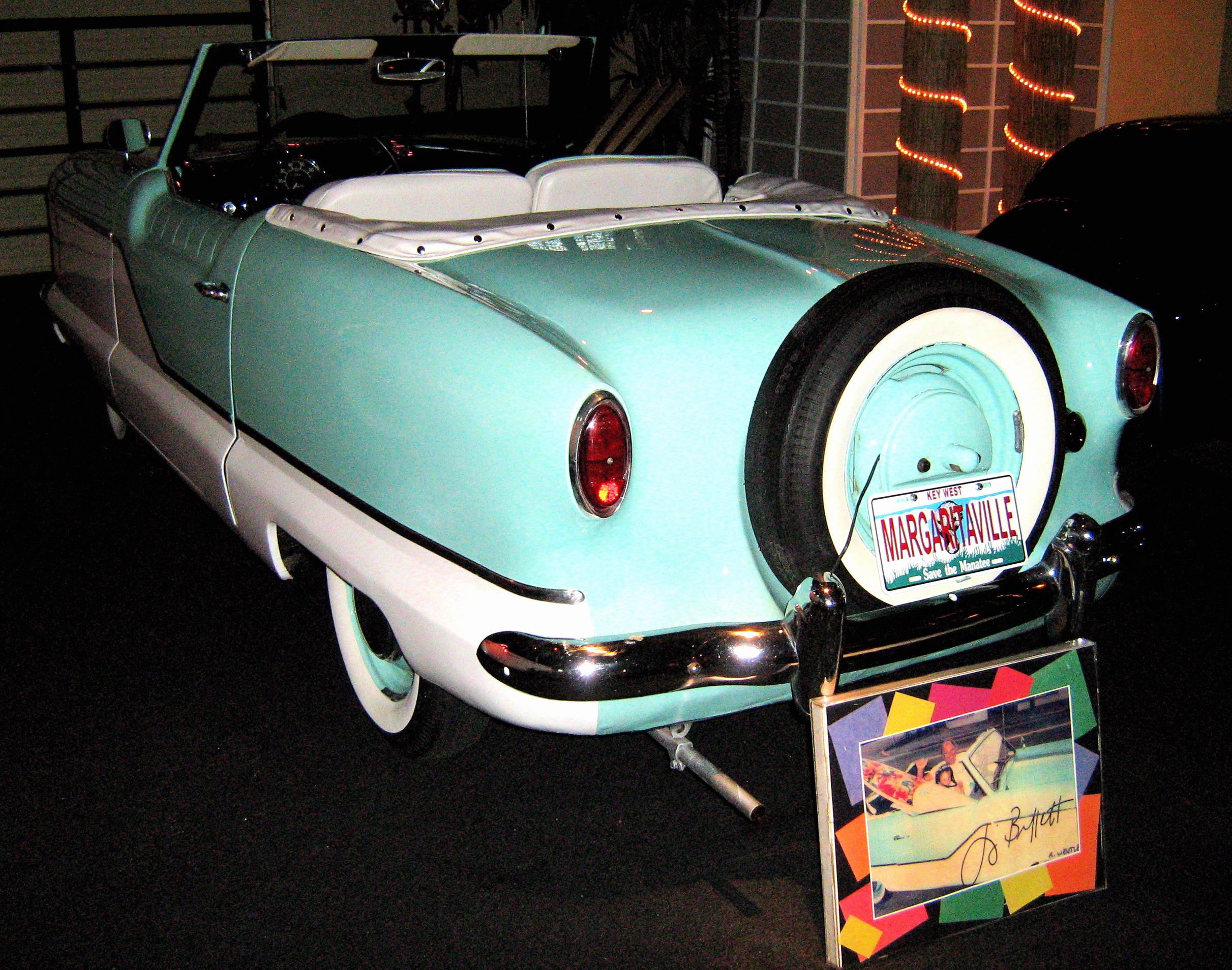
1958 Metropolitan owned by Jimmy Buffett

- Jimmy Buffett
- Bridget Fonda
- Greg Gutfeld
- Steve Jobs
- Sarah "Bogi" Lateiner
- Princess Margaret
- Paul Newman
- Elvis Presley
- Graham Stark
