= Astra-Gnome =

Concept car by Richard Arbib

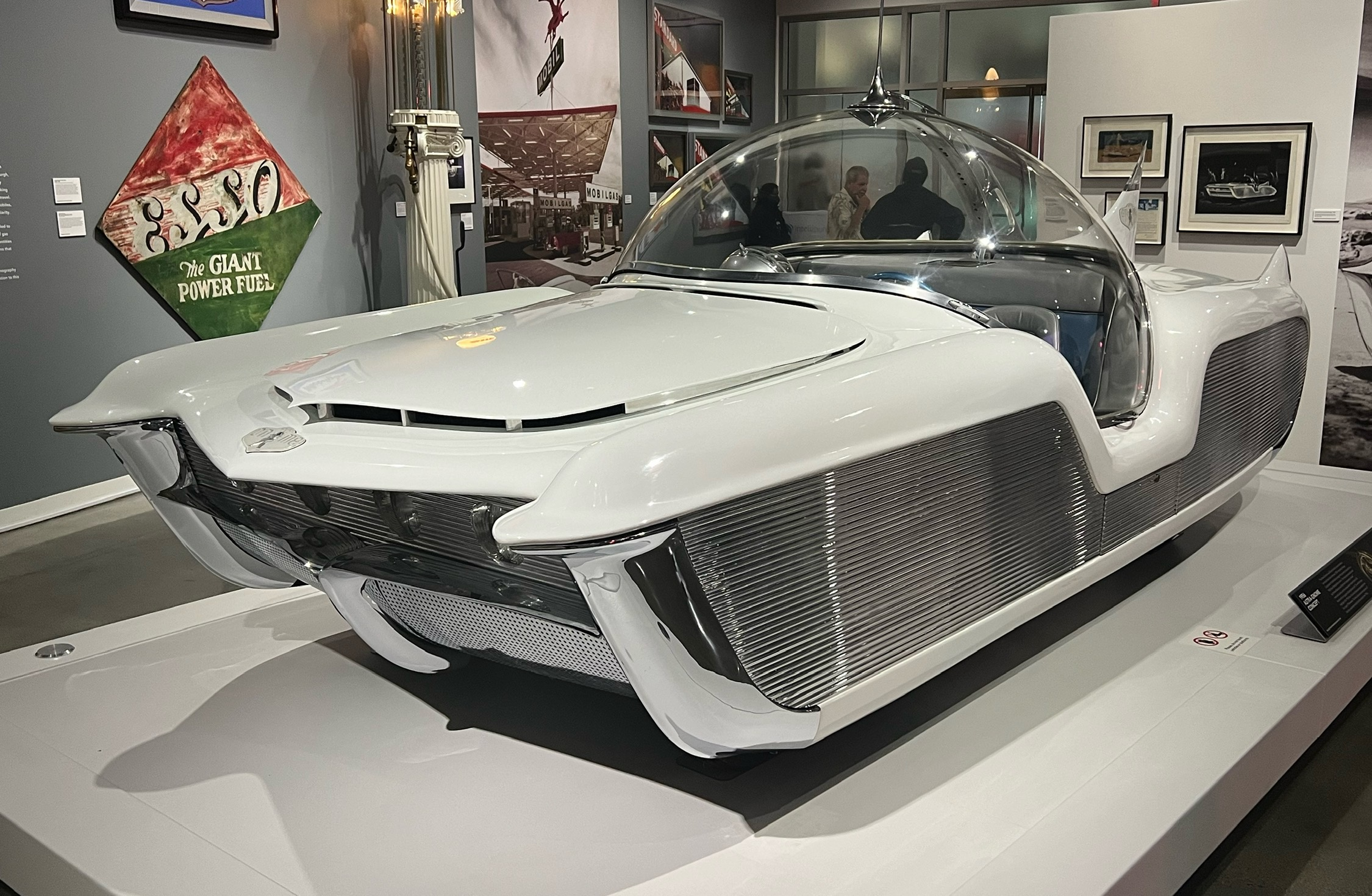
- Astra-Gnome (Petersen Automotive Museum)

Overview
- Manufacturer: American Motors Corporation (AMC)
- Designer: Richard Arbib

Body and chassis
- Class: Concept car
- Platform: Nash Metropolitan

Dimensions
- Wheelbase: 85 in (2,159 mm)
- Length: 162 in (4,115 mm)
- Width: 72 in (1,829 mm)
- Curb weight: under 2,000 lb (907 kg)

The Astra-Gnome is a concept car by industrial designer Richard Arbib using a 1955 Nash Metropolitan chassis. It was described as a "Time and Space Car". It features themes influenced by the space travel forms that were popular during the 1950s. The vehicle represented Arbib's vision of what an automobile would look like in the year 2000.

== Design ==
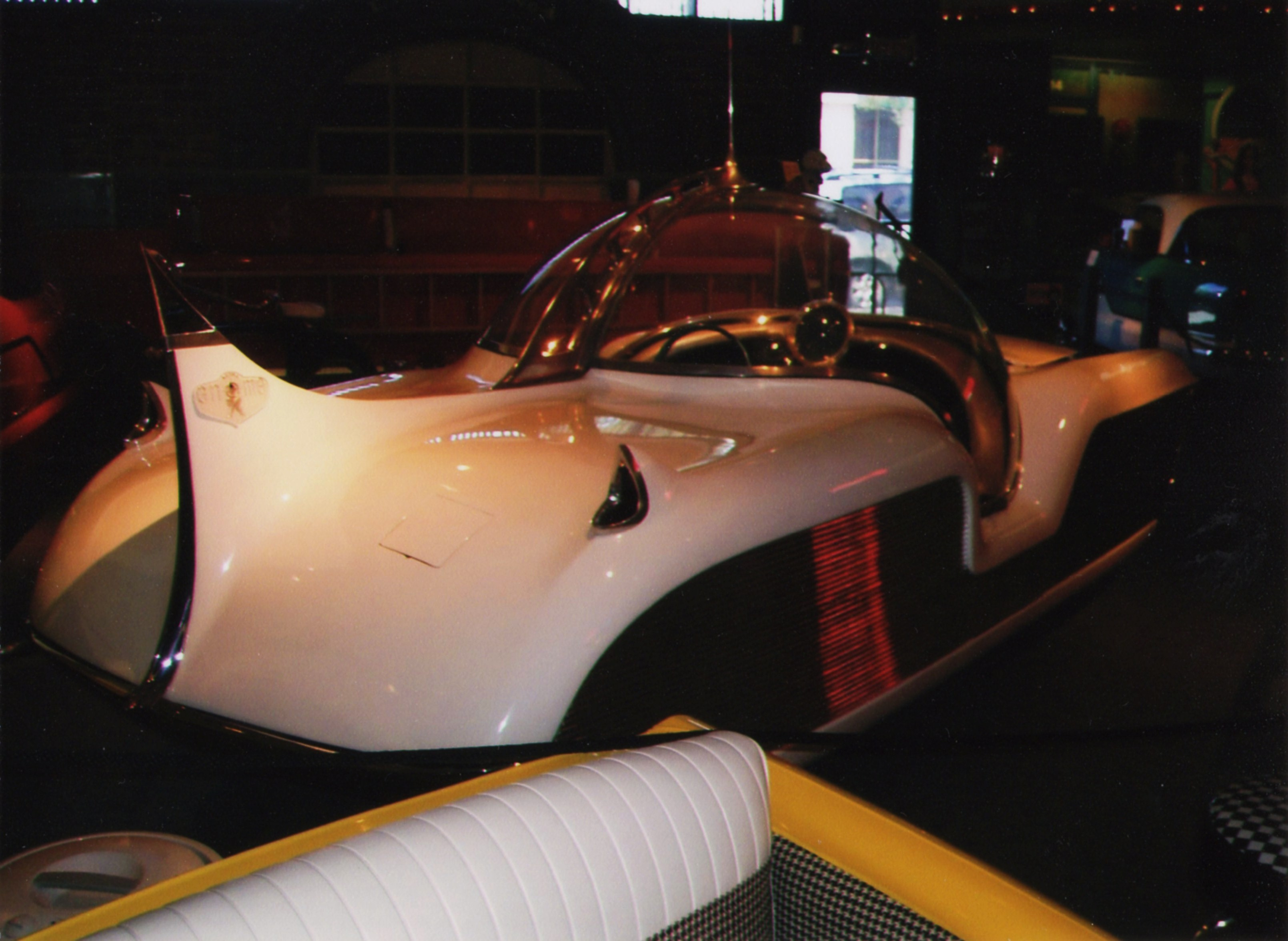
Astra-Gnome rear

American Motors Corporation commissioned Richard Arbib, a leading industrial designer of the 1950s, to develop a futuristic concept car. Built in four months, the Astra-Gnome represented the work of product stylists to create "new and exciting shapes, textures and colors in a functional car." Arbib had the wheels and tires hidden behind full fender skirts to achieve "a floating special quality" and to suggest a spacecraft or hovercraft. The objective was to build excitement "about the cool stuff the 21st century was going to hold." Arbib described it not being a sports car or having any European-origin styling. Instead, he made it to have "a pert, futuristic manner ... sculptural and alive in its contours". The concept car blends futuristic aesthetics with functional design and is a fully operational vehicle.

The car was featured on the 3 September 1956 cover of Newsweek magazine. The Astra-Gnome was a highlight at the 1956 New York International Auto Show. About 1,000 questionnaire cards were distributed to viewers at the auto show, with results indicating an 80% favorable response to the prototype. Numerous photos of the car with Arbib were often accompanied by attractive female models who explained to the media that the concept was never intended for production. The Astra-Gnome was featured in trade publications and popular magazines, such part of a fashion spread in Esquire.

Andrew Mazzara of New York manufactured the body. It was built in a "lightning-quick" four months. Despite a 25% increase in size over the original Metropolitan body, the total weight remains under 2,000 pounds (907 kg). About 400 lb (181 kg) of aluminum castings and extrusions were used, including fluted aluminum side panels that had been anodized in different blending colors. The hood features a futuristic gnome/astronaut logo, which also appears on the tailfin, and the taillights have a 1950s look. The bubble canopy provides unobstructed all-around vision while covering the passengers. A motor-driven aluminum arm opens the canopy from the back to allow walk-in entry and exit. The interior features bucket seats upholstered in blue and "space-age" gray upholstery with an integrated center console between them. An Astra-Gnome logo adorns the center of the chromed blue steering wheel. The control knobs, along with the gear shifter knob, are clear and transparent blue.

Among its many features is a Hamilton "celestial time-zone clock permitting actual flight-type navigation." The acrylic glass bubble canopy also served as a sound chamber for the car's high fidelity radio and record player. The car included air conditioning and wrap-around bumper protection that was matched to the height of full-sized car bumpers. The 6-foot (1.83 m) width of the concept car was much greater than contemporary passenger automobiles and allowed for extra interior room, as well as storage and luggage spaces that included six pieces of matched integrated luggage. The design made parking the wide Astra-Gnome easier by making the curb visible from the car.

The concept car "disappeared into oblivion" after its exhibition to be recovered from a sealed high-rise office in New York City in 1980. The car is restored and can be seen in a California museum. It was also featured in the "Eyes on the Road" exhibit at the Petersen Automotive Museum.
