= Century Boat Company =

American boatbuilding company

Century Boats
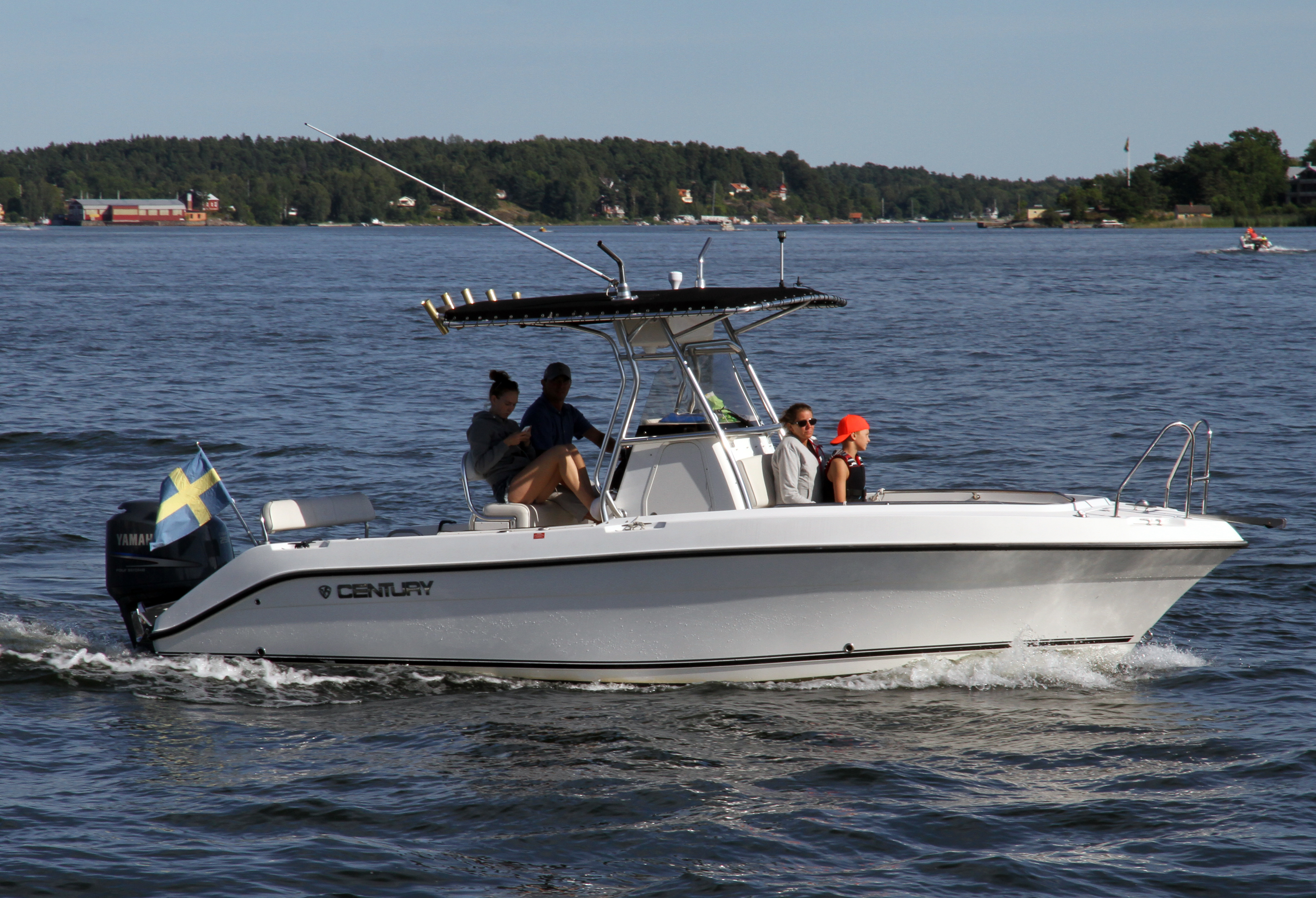
- Founded: 1926
- Founder: James and William Welch
- Headquarters: Zephyrhills, Florida, United States
- Products: Fiberglass boats
- Website: www.centuryboats.com

The Century Boat Company is an American boatbuilder founded in 1926 in Milwaukee, Wisconsin. Two years later, the company relocated to Manistee, Michigan. In 1983, it opened a production facility in Panama City, Florida. The firm was sold to Yamaha in 1995, and in 2012, it was acquired by Allcraft Marine of Florida. Following its bankruptcy in 2025, a Florida-based organization has assumed management.

== History ==
The Century Boat Company was founded in 1926 in Milwaukee, Wisconsin, by two brothers, James and William Welch, who specialized in building wooden plank hulls for speed.

The company moved to Manistee, Michigan, in 1928. By 1930, the company produced 1,000 boats. It expanded into new outboard-powered models.

In September 1931, five Century hulls set a series of official world speed records, powered by Johnson or Evinrude outboard motors. The Century Hurricane model achieved 51 miles per hour (82 km/h).

By 1937, the company offered 28 models of boats. During World War II, it had a contract to build and deliver 3,600 vessels. It received the Army-Navy "E" Award for excellence in production.

The late 1950s were the height of success for the company, and it hired Richard Arbib, an automotive designer. This saw the introduction of styles associated with American cars of the time, but the planned obsolescence devalued the company's boats.

In the 1960s, Century introduced 45 ft (14 m) motor yachts and jet-powered boats. In 1967, the last wooden boat was manufactured at the Manistee Facility as production transitioned to fiberglass. In the 1970s, the Coronado model was one of the most popular boats in the marketplace. In 1983, production was moved to a new facility in Panama City, Florida.

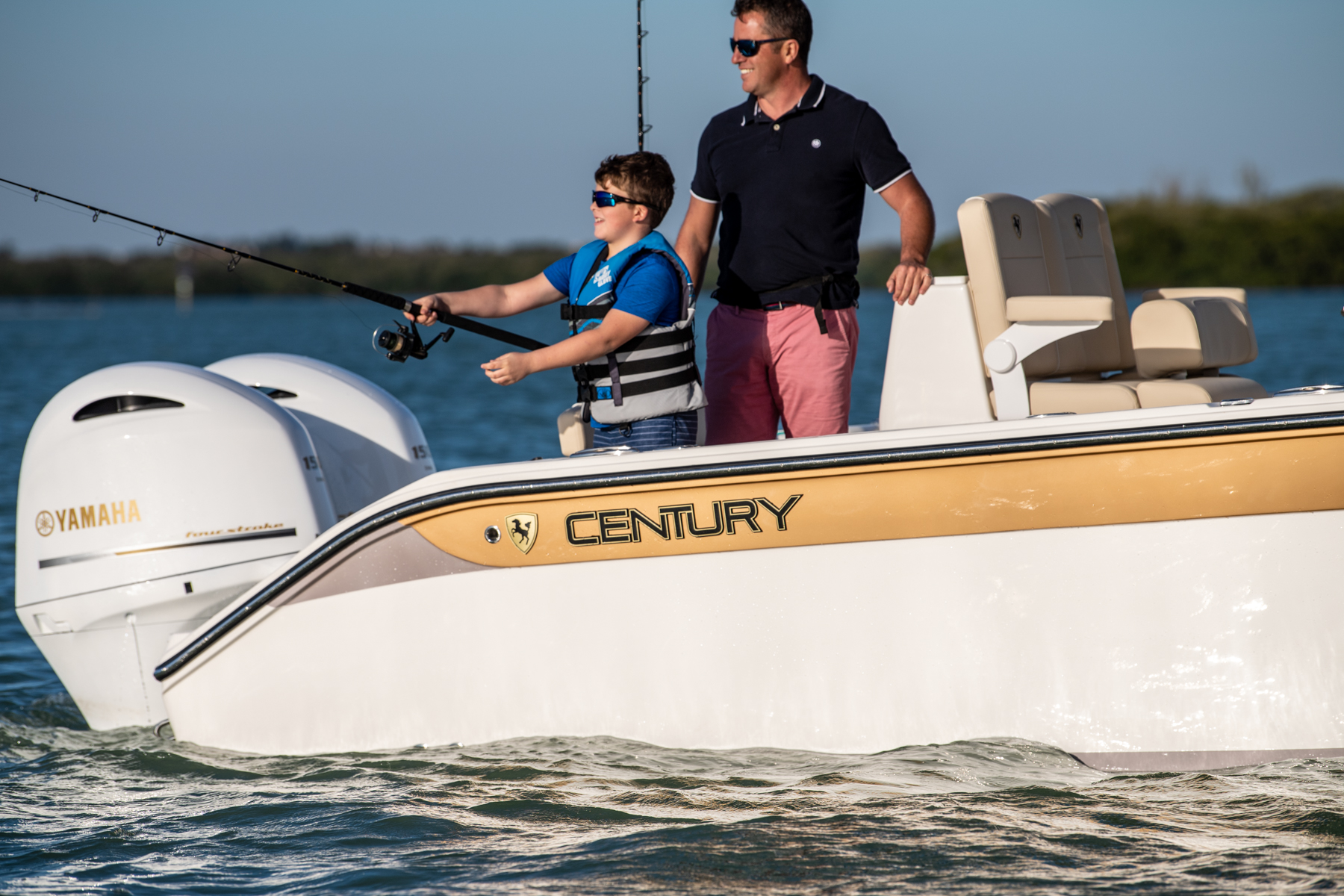
Century Boat with Yamaha outboards

In 1990, Century Boats became part of GAC Partners (General Marine). To enhance investment for the business, the boat company agreed to use Yamaha outboards. In 1995, Century was purchased by Yamaha, which had purchased Cobia Boats a few months earlier; the new company was called C&C Boats.

Yamaha sold Cobia in March 2005 to focus on one brand of boats, but in 2009, Yamaha announced that Century boats was for sale. In 2012, Allcraft Marine, based in Dade City, Florida, purchased and revived the brand with a line of saltwater fishing and family boats. Allcraft Marine sold a controlling interest in Century Boats to Sorfam Capital in March 2020.

The business filed Chapter 11 in early 2025. Allcraft Marine's assets — including Century Boats — were sold via court-approved bankruptcy proceedings to American Nautical Holdings in Zephyrhills, Florida. The new firm has announced plans for new boats ranging from 19 to 52 feet (5.8 to 15.8 m).
