= Richard Arbib =

American industrial designer

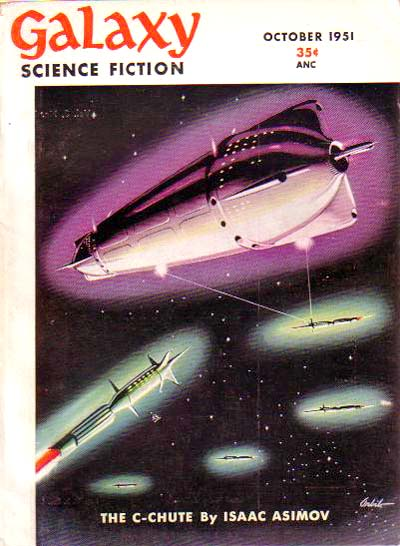
In the 1950s, Arbib painted two covers for Galaxy Science Fiction

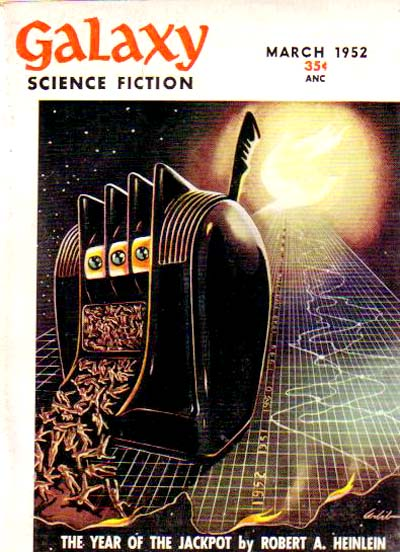
The second illustrated a novelette by Robert A. Heinlein

Richard Henry Arbib (September 1, 1917 in Gloversville, New York – February 22, 1995 in Manhattan, New York City) was an American industrial designer.

He was a design consultant known for working on many products and services. His focus was on automobiles. Arbib created a unique look for the Hudson line that was to share the senior 1955 Nash body as well as his vision of what an automobile would look like in the year 2000, the Astra-Gnome "Time and Space Car."

== Family ==
Richard Henry Arbib was the son of Robert Simeon Arbib, Sr. (March 3, 1889, in Cairo, Egypt – January 1969 in New York) and Edna Josephine Henry (November 3, 1889, in Richmond, Virginia – July 17, 1975, in New York City). Robert Sr. arrived in the United States from Liverpool, England in May 1908. Siblings were Robert Arbib, Jr. (March 17, 1915, in New York – July 1987 in New York) and John A. Arbib (September 18, 1924, in New York – January 3, 2010, in Jacksonville, Florida).

Richard Arbib was married to Audrey Schulz and they were divorced in 1952 in Volusia County, Florida. Audrey later married Associated Press photographer Baron Hans Ferdinand von Nolde (born Berlin, Germany, died November 9, 2002, at 77 years of age). Richard later married Helen W. He dated model Bettie Page in the 1950s.

== Career ==
Arbib graduated from the Pratt Institute in New York City in 1939 after taking industrial-design courses and also serving as vice president of his graduating class. His first job was working as a consultant to the General Motors Art and Color staff that was supervised by Harley Earl.

Arbib was an armament specialist during World War II working for Republic Aviation. He returned to Detroit and worked for the Harley Earl Corporation on a variety of product and service designs that included tires, watches, cameras, and railroad car interiors. Arbib moved to New York and started his independent design consultancy.

=== Henney and Packard ===
His first contract was with the Henney Motor Company of Freeport, Illinois, the largest manufacturer of professional car bodies such as ambulances, hearses, and limousines in the United States. Henney was also Packard's sole professional body supplier. Arbib was responsible for the design of the commercial line of Packard built by Henney from 1951 until 1954. His work for Henney included a custom-built Packard Super Station Wagon with seating for 12 passengers, air conditioning, a beverage cabinet, and distinctive curved rear windows.

Arbib also provided design consultancy for Packard. He crafted a pillarless Packard "Monte Carlo" show car, based on a Custom 8 chassis.

Arbib designed the Packard "Pan American" for the International Motor Sports Show held in New York City at the Grand Central Palace on March 29, 1952. It was based upon a 1951 Packard 250 convertible that was lowered and smoothed into a two-seat luxury roadster featuring a transparent roof. The Pan American won the first-place trophy for the most outstanding design at the show. It was an effort to restore the glamour of the Packard name and got the attention of executives at Packard, who ordered Henney to build five more Pan Americans to display at auto shows in the United States and abroad.

The sales decline at Packard affected Henney which had an exclusive contract with Packard since 1937. Packard discontinued chassis for the professional-car business and Henney closed the Freeport plant. One of the last assignments for Arbib was for an ambulance based on the 1955 Ford Thunderbird.

=== American Motors Corporation ===
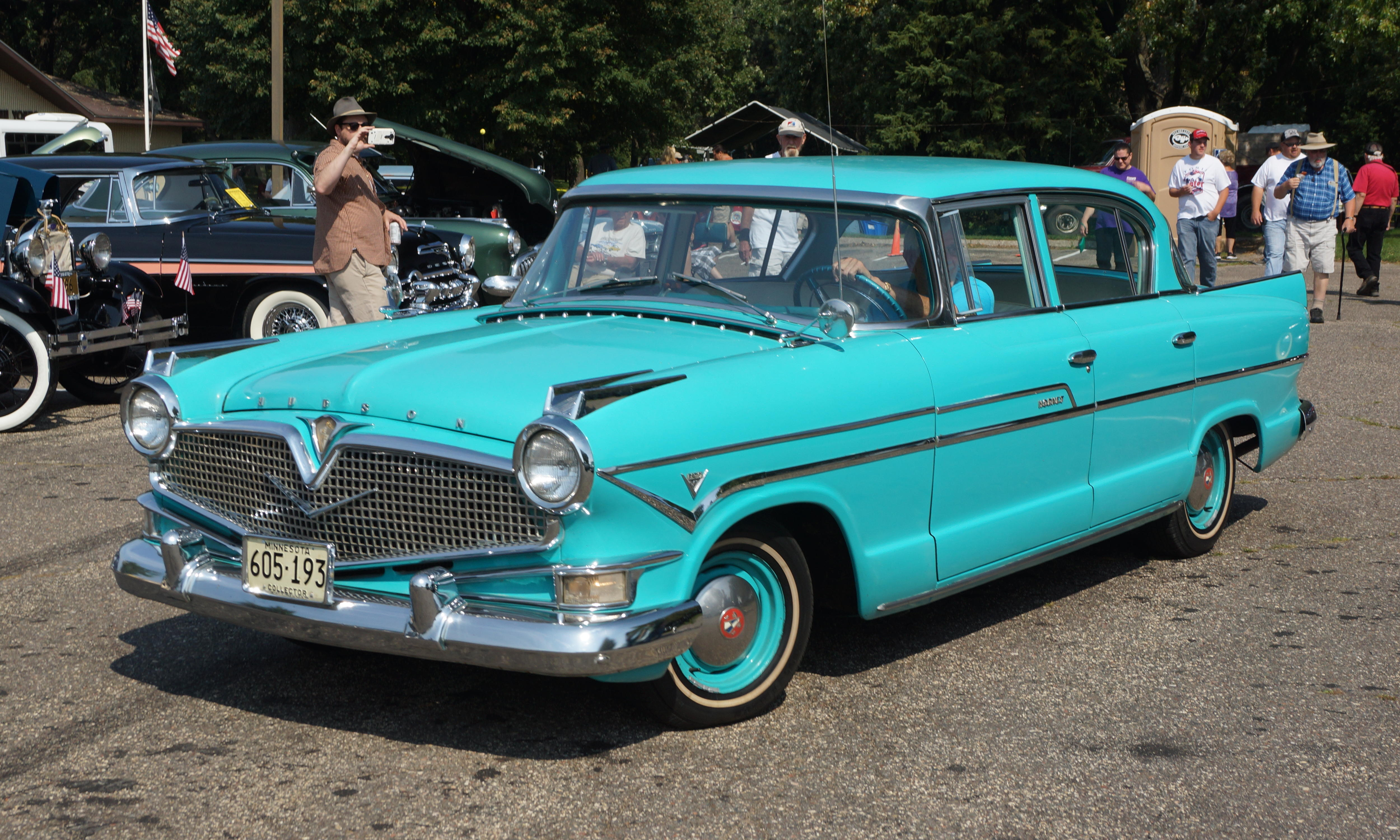
1957 Hudson Hornet Super sedan with "V" form styling

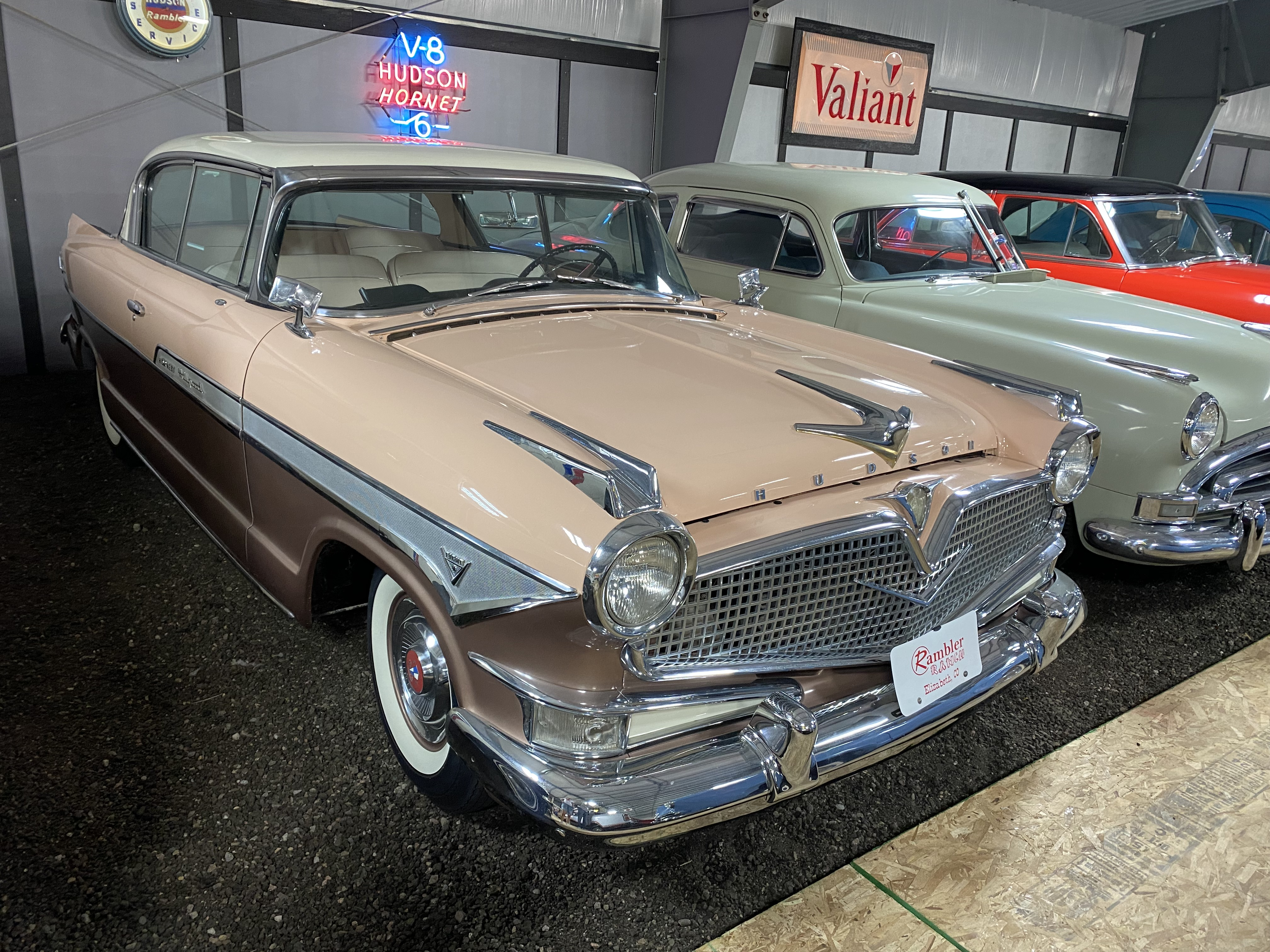
1957 Hudson Hornet Hollywood 2-door hardtop in tri-tone paint

In 1955, Arbib was hired by American Motors Corporation (AMC) to create a unique look for the Hudson line that was to share the senior 1955 Nash body. The problem was the Nash's unibody meaning only small changes such as the trim. The mandate for Arbib was to keep the existing body to avoid major sheet metal stamping changes while reworking the front grille, side trim patterns, taillights, and small details. The cars included tri-tone paint schemes as part of a "bolder design." Arbib's main design theme was to use a "V" form throughout the car, which he dubbed V-Line styling.

The design theme was to correspond with AMC starting to build its V8 engines to replace the Packard V8 it was using in its Hudson and Nash models. While Arbib was effective to "balance conflicting objectives and present an acceptable finish products," the production 1956 Hudson has been viewed as "badly-compromised styling."

Arbib also designed, and Andrew Mazzara built, the Astra-Gnome "Time and Space Car" concept car that included a "celestial time-zone clock permitting actual flight-type navigation." The design was influenced by space travel forms. The vehicle was based on the Nash Metropolitan and was Arbib's vision of what an automobile would look like in the year 2000. The Astra-Gnome attracted attention at the 1956 International Automobile Show in New York, and was also featured on the cover of Newsweek magazine's September 3, 1956 issue.

=== Design works ===
Arbib designed asymmetrical cases for the new Hamilton electric watches in the 1950s, including such notable models as the Ventura, Everest, and Pacer. He also designed watches for Tourneau, Benrus, Sheffield, and Gucci.

He designed boats for the Century Boat Company in the 1950s, including their most successful and expensive models, the Coronado introduced in 1959.
