= Sarah Lateiner =

American television personality

Sarah Leteiner
- Born: Flushing, Queens
- Education: Oberlin College, Universal Technical Institute
- Occupations: mechanic; entrepreneur; educator; reality television personality
- Website: girlganggarage.com

Sarah 'Bogi' Lateiner is an American automobile mechanic, small business owner, technical educator, and reality television personality. She is known for teaching car maintenance and repair classes for women nationwide.

== Early life ==
Lateiner was born December 15, 1977, in Flushing, New York City borough of Queens, and was largely raised in Montclair, New Jersey. In high school, she spent a year studying abroad in Hungary, and adopted the nickname "Bogi" as the shortened version of her Hungarian name, Boglárka. She was a college student when her older sister, Jenni, died in an accident. She studied Law & Society and Women's Studies at Oberlin College, but decided to pursue a career in the automotive trades instead of becoming a lawyer.

== Career ==
Lateiner worked as a BMW certified mechanic in Arizona and New York for six years—the only female mechanic in the shops that employed her—before opening her own shop. She started her business in her driveway in 2006, before opening 180 Degrees Automotive, in Phoenix, Arizona. Her business was initially a two-car auto repair shop, but by her sixth year in business, with over a million dollars in sales, she purchased a two-story building to house her staff of six, envisioning an auto repair business on the first floor and educational car classes for women on the second floor.

She began the shop with the goal of using it to teach car education for women, but demand for her automotive and educational work was so high that she had to revise her plans. She teaches car maintenance classes for women, and has become a coach through the automotive industry. Her speaking engagements focus on more effective communication with customers. In her business, she reserves apprenticeships for female technicians, believing that it is particularly difficult for women to get a first job in the automotive industry. She has also started a scholarship for women pursuing careers in the automotive field.

In 2011, she was named to the Phoenix Business Journal's Forty Under 40 list.

=== Reality TV show ===
Lateiner has co-hosted the television show All Girls Garage on the Motor Trend TV Network since 2012. This is an educational show about vehicle repair. In 2017, she started 'Bogi's Garage,' which took as a first project the rebuilding of a 1957 Chevy Montage truck by 90 experienced and inexperienced women, in time for the annual SEMA show.
