= 1872 in rail transport =

This article lists events related to rail transport that occurred in 1872.

== Events ==
=== March events ===
- March – John Adams Dix succeeds Jay Gould as president of the Erie Railroad.
- March 1 – Jackson and Woodin Manufacturing Company, one of the constituent companies of American Car and Foundry Company, is incorporated in Pennsylvania.
- March 5 – George Westinghouse receives a patent for the Westinghouse air brake.
- March 11 – The 3/4 mile (1.2 km) long Bristol Harbour Railway opens from the junction of the Bristol and Exeter Railway and Great Western Railway at Temple Meads to the Floating Harbour in Bristol.

=== April events ===
- April 1 – The Midland Railway (Great Britain) admits Third class passengers to all trains, a move which other British railway companies follow.
- April 6 – Wallkill Valley Railroad opens Rosendale Trestle, at this time the highest bridge in the United States, to rail traffic in Rosendale, New York.

=== May events ===
- May 1 – The Buckfastleigh, Totnes and South Devon Railway, in England, opens.
- May 1 – The Atchison, Topeka and Santa Fe Railroad begins construction westward from Newton, Kansas, toward Colorado.
- May 18 – The Delaware and Raritan Canal, New Jersey Railroad and the Camden and Amboy Railroad, the first railroad built in New Jersey, are merged into the United New Jersey Railroad and Canal Company.
- May 28 – The Columbus and Toledo Railroad is incorporated.

=== June events ===
- June 12 – First section of railway in Japan opens, from Yokohama to Shinagawa, Tokyo.
- June 17 – The Atchison, Topeka and Santa Fe Railroad, building westward from Newton, Kansas, reaches Hutchinson.

=== July events ===
- July – Peter H. Watson succeeds John A. Dix as president of the Erie Railroad.
- July 1 – Schenker, predecessor of global freight forwarder DB Schenker, is founded in Vienna.
- July 2 – Baltimore and Potomac Railroad opens its line from Baltimore, Maryland, to Washington, D.C., via Huntington.

=== August events ===
- August 5 – The Atchison, Topeka and Santa Fe Railroad, building westward from Newton, Kansas, reaches Great Bend.
- August 12 – The Atchison, Topeka and Santa Fe Railroad, building westward from Newton, Kansas, reaches Larned.

=== September events ===
- September 5 – The Atchison, Topeka and Santa Fe Railroad, building westward from Newton, Kansas, reaches Dodge City, Kansas.
- September 13 – The first section of the planned railroad connection between Vârciorova and Roman, Romania, opens, connecting Piteşti, Bucharest, Galaţi and Roman.

=== October events ===
- October 1
  - The Denver, South Park and Pacific Railway is incorporated.
  - The first meeting of the Time Table Conventions, an organization that later became the American Railway Association, is held in Louisville, Kentucky.
- October 2 – The Kirtlebridge rail crash in Scotland kills 10 people.
- October 10
  - First passenger service on the Transcaucasian Railway (later Georgian Railway) in the Russian Empire, between the capital, Tbilisi, and the Black Sea port of Poti.
  - Shimbashi Teishajō, the original Tokyo terminus of Japan's first railway, opens.
- October 14 (September 12 in Tenpō calendar) – Official inauguration of first Japanese railway between Shimbashi, Tokyo (modern-day Shiodome) and Yokohama (modern-day Sakuragichō) (provisionally in June)

=== November events ===
- November 1 – Ensign Manufacturing Company, later to become part of American Car and Foundry Company, is incorporated in West Virginia.

=== December events ===
- December 28 – The Atchison, Topeka and Santa Fe Railroad, building westward from Newton, Kansas, reaches the border between Kansas and Colorado.

=== Unknown date events ===
- Strasburg, Colorado – joining of rail over river completes transcontinental railway.
- American steam locomotive builder Manchester Locomotive Works purchases the fire engine manufacturing business of Amoskeag Locomotive Works.
- At the age of 29, William Cornelius Van Horne becomes the youngest superintendent of Illinois Central Railroad.
- Buffalo Car Manufacturing Company, later to become part of American Car and Foundry, is founded in Buffalo, New York.
- The Wilmington, Columbia and Augusta Railroad leases North Carolina's Wilmington and Weldon Railroad.

== Births ==
=== September births ===
- September 20 – Death Valley Scotty (born Walter Edward Scott), con man who chartered the Scott Special record-breaking run on the Atchison, Topeka and Santa Fe Railway in 1905.

== Deaths ==
=== January deaths ===
- January 6 – Jim Fisk, American financier who worked with Daniel Drew for control of the Erie Railroad (b. 1834).

=== February deaths ===
- 8 February – Joseph Pease, English railway promoter (b. 1799).

=== April deaths ===
- April 9 – Erastus Corning, established railroads in New York and was instrumental in the formation of New York Central (b. 1794).

=== August deaths ===
- August – Asa Whitney, one of the first backers of an American Transcontinental Railway
