= List of reporting marks: S =

Note: Marks ending in U are for container owners; marks ending in X are not common carriers; marks ending in Z are for trailers without flanged wheels. All other marks are of common-carrier railroads.

== S ==
- SA - Savannah and Atlanta Railway; Central of Georgia Railroad
- SAL - Seaboard Air Line Railway; Seaboard System Railroad; CSX Transportation
- SAMX - Cargill, Inc. (Seaboard Allied Milling Department)
- SAN - Sandersville Railroad
- SANX - San Angelo Tank Car Line
- SAPT - Savannah Port Terminal Railroad
- SATX - City Public Service Board of San Antonio
- SAUX - Sauvage Gas Company
- SAWX - Sawco, Inc.
- SAZX - Saz Transportation Corporation
- SB - South Buffalo Railway
- SBC - Ferrocarril Sonora Baja California
- SBD - Seaboard System Railroad; CSX Transportation
- SBGX - Industry Financial Corporation
- SBIX - Standard Brands, Inc.
- SBK - South Brooklyn Railway
- SBLN - Sterling Belt Line Railway
- SBLX - Sunbelt/Chlor/Alkali Partnership
- SBM - St. Louis, Brownsville and Mexico
- SBVR - South Branch Valley Railroad
- SC - Sumter and Choctaw Railway
- SCAX - Southern California Regional Rail Authority (Metrolink)
- SCBG - Santa Cruz, Big Trees and Pacific Railway
- SCCX - Shell Oil Company
- SCEX - Southern California Edison
- SCFE - South Central Florida Railroad
- SCFS - Straits Car Ferry Service Corporation
- SCGX - Schuler Grain Company; Eades Commodities
- SCHX - Stauffer Chemical Company
- SCJX - Gulf Oil Products Company; Chevron Phillips Chemical Company
- SCL - Seaboard Coast Line Railroad; Seaboard System Railroad; CSX Transportation
- SCLX - Spielman & Caddell Leasing
- SCM - Strouds Creek and Muddlety Railroad
- SCMX - Shell Oil Company
- SCOX - Scoular Bishop Grain Company
- SCPX - Shell Oil Company
- SCR - SCR
- SCRW - Seaway Commercial Railway
- SCST - Seaboard Transportation Company (subsidiary of Seaboard Coast Line Railroad)
- SCT - Sioux City Terminal Railway
- SCTR - South Central Tennessee Railroad
- SCWX - South Carolina Public Service Authority
- SCXF - South Central Florida Express, Inc.
- SCXY - St. Croix Valley Railroad
- SCYX - Farmers Cooperative Association of York, Nebraska
- SDA - San Diego and Arizona Railway
- SDAE - San Diego and Arizona Eastern Railway
- SDCX - AMAX Chemical Corporation
- SDER - San Diego Electric Railway
- SDEX - Swindell-Dressler Energy Supply Company
- SDIV - San Diego and Imperial Valley Railroad (expired)
- SDIY - San Diego and Imperial Valley Railroad
- SDNX - North County Transit District
- SDPX - South Dakota Soybeen Processors
- SDRX - Sounder commuter rail
- SE - Ferrocarriles Unidos del Sureste
- SECX - South-East Coal Company
- SEIX - Seimax Gas Corporation
- SEMX - Seminole Electric Cooperative
- SEPA - SEPTA
- SEPX - Southwestern Electric Power Company
- SERA - Sierra Railroad
- SERX - ACF Industries (Shippers Car Line Division)
- SFIX - System Fuels, Inc.
- SFLC - Atchison, Topeka and Santa Fe Railway; BNSF Railway
- SFLR - Shore Fast Line Railroad
- SFPP - Spruce Fall Power and Paper
- SFQ - Atchison, Topeka and Santa Fe Railway; BNSF Railway End Of Train Devices
- SFRB - Atchison, Topeka and Santa Fe Railway (Santa Fe Refrigerated Despatch)
- SFRC - Atchison, Topeka and Santa Fe Railway (Santa Fe Refrigerated Despatch)
- SFRD - Atchison, Topeka and Santa Fe Railway (Santa Fe Refrigerated Despatch)
- SFRE - Atchison, Topeka and Santa Fe Railway (Santa Fe Refrigerated Despatch)
- SFRP - Atchison, Topeka and Santa Fe Railway (Santa Fe Refrigerated Despatch)
- SFSR - Santa Fe Southern Railway
- SFSX - San Francisco Transportation Services Company
- SFTX - Continental Tank Car Corporation
- SGAX - SGA Leasing Company
- SGCX - Sungas Corporation of Florida
- SGIX - LPG Transportation, Inc.
- SGLR - Seminole Gulf Railway
- SH - Steelton and Highspire Railroad
- SHLX - Procor Ltd.
- SHPX - American Industrial Transport, formerly ACF Leasing/Shippers Car Line Division
- SHQX - American Industrial Transport
- SHRX - Kansas City Railroad Museum
- SI - Spokane International Railroad; Union Pacific Railroad
- SIGX - Southern Indiana Gas and Electric Company
- SIMX - Sierra Bag Company
- SIND - Southern Indiana Railway
- SIRC - Staten Island Railway
- SIRR - Southern Industrial Railroad
- SIRX - Southern Illinois Railcar Corporation
- SJFX - Western Fuels & Asphalt Supply, Inc.; GLNX Corporation
- SJMX - St. Joe Minerals Corporation
- SJRT - St. Johns River Terminal
- SJT - St. Joseph Terminal Railroad
- SJVR - San Joaquin Valley Railroad
- SKCX - ARCO Chemical Company
- SKNX - Saskatchewan Grain Car Corporation
- SKOL - South Kansas and Oklahoma Railroad
- SKPX - Saskatchewan Grain Car Corporation
- SKSX - Safety-Kleen Systems, Inc.
- SKTX - Ski Train
- SL - Salt Lake City Southern Railroad
- SLAW - St. Lawrence Railroad
- SLAX - St. Lawrence Starch Company, Ltd.
- SLC - San Luis Central Railroad
- SLGG - Sidney and Lowe Railroad
- SLGW - Salt Lake, Garfield and Western Railway
- SLH - Sugarloaf and Hazelton Railroad
- SLOX - Selox, Inc.
- SLR - St. Lawrence and Atlantic Railroad
- SLRG - San Luis and Rio Grande Railroad
- SLRX - Southern Locomotive & Railcar
- SLSF - St. Louis - San Francisco Railway (Frisco); Burlington Northern Railroad
- SLWC - Stillwater Central Railroad
- SLTX - Slade Transport, Inc.
- SM - St. Mary's Railroad
- SMA - San Manuel Arizona Railroad
- SMAR - Sonoma–Marin Area Rail Transit
- SMCX - San Miguel Electric Cooperative
- SMEX - South Mississippi Electric Power Association
- SMMX - St. Mary's Cement Company
- SMPX - Stone Mountain Scenic Railroad
- SMRR - Sisseton Milbank Railroad
- SMNX - Solvay Minerals, Inc.
- SMRX - Southeastern Railway Museum
- SMV - Santa Maria Valley Railroad
- SN - Sacramento Northern Railway
- SNBL - Sioux City and New Orleans Barge Line
- SNCT - Seattle and North Coast Railroad
- SNFX - IND/AG Chemicals, Inc.
- SNHX - IND/AG Chemicals, Inc.
- SNJX - NJ Transit River Line work train (Southern New Jersey Rail Group)
- SOEX - Shell Oil Company
- SOGX - Diamond Shamrock Chemicals Company
- SOIX - Sand Seed Service, Inc.
- SOLX - Solano Rail Car Company
- SOM - Somerset Railroad
- SOO - Soo Line Railroad; Canadian Pacific Railway
- SOPR - South Pierce Railroad
- SOR - Southern Ontario Railway
- SOU - Southern Railway; Norfolk Southern Railway
- SP - Southern Pacific Railroad; Union Pacific Railroad
- SPAX - SEPTA
- SPCX - SPC Rail Group LLC
- SPEG - Spencerville and Elgin Railroad
- SPFE - Pacific Fruit Express; Southern Pacific Railroad; Union Pacific Railroad
- SPGX - Suburban Propane
- SPMW - Southern Pacific Railroad; Union Pacific Railroad (maintenance of Way)
- SPQ - Southern Pacific Railroad; Union Pacific Railroad End Of Train Devices
- SPS - Spokane, Portland and Seattle Railway; Burlington Northern Railroad
- SPSX - Progress Rail Services
- SPUD - St. Paul Union Depot Company
- SQVR - Sequatchie Valley Railroad
- SRAX - Southern Rail Associates, Inc.
- SRC - Strasburg Railroad
- SRCX - Sid Richardson Carbon Company
- SRIX - Southern Region Industrial Realty, Inc.; Southwest Rail Industries, Inc.
- SRL - Swift Refrigerator Lines (expired)
- SRLX - General American Transportation Corporation
- SRN - Sabine River and Northern Railroad
- SROX - United States Department of Energy (Savannah River Operations Office)
- SRPX - Salt River Project Agricultural Improvement and Power District
- SRRX - Star Railroad Equipment
- SRY - Southern Railway of British Columbia
- SS - Sand Springs Railway
- SSAM - Sault Ste. Marie Bridge Company (subsidiary of Wisconsin Central)
- SSDK - Savannah State Docks Railroad
- SSGX - McMaster Grain Company
- SSH - South Shore Railroad
- SSR - S&S Shortline
- SSEX - Radius Recycling (Schnitzer Steel Industries)
- SSIX - Itel Corporation
- SSW - St. Louis Southwestern Railway (Cotton Belt); Southern Pacific Railroad; Union Pacific Railroad
- ST - Springfield Terminal Railway; Boston and Maine Railroad; Pan Am Railways
- STAX - Stauffer Chemical Company; OCI Chemical Corporation
- STC - Simpson Timber Company
- STCX - Sterling China Company
- STE - Stockton Terminal and Eastern Railroad
- STER - St. Thomas and Eastern Railway
- STEX - Sterling Chemicals, Inc.
- STLE - St. Louis & Evansville Railroad Co.
- STLX - A. E. Staley
- STMA - St. Maries River Railroad
- STMX - A. E. Staley
- STOX - ACF Industries
- STRC - Stuart Chemical Transportation
- STRT - Stewartstown Railroad
- STRX - St. Regis Paper Company
- STSX - A. E. Staley
- STTX - Trailer Train Company
- STWX - Struthers Wells Corporation
- SULX - Sultran
- SUN - Sunset Railway
- SUNX - Sun Refining and Marketing Company
- SUR - State University Railroad
- SVGX - Savage services
- SVI - Southern Railway of Vancouver Island, E and N Railway
- SVIL - Saltville Railroad
- SW - Southwestern Railroad
- SWCX - Estech, Inc.
- SWFX - Southwest Forest Industries, Inc.
- SWGX - Southwest Georgia Railroad Excursion Authority/SAM Shortline Excursion Train
- SWIX - Stonewall Industries LLC
- SWLX - Essel Corporation
- SWRX - Richmond Rail Equipment Leasing Company
- SWYX - Stauffer Chemical Company of Wyoming
