= Bill 167 =

Bill 167 may refer to:

== Canada ==
- Equality Rights Statute Amendment Act, an Ontario bill in 1994 which would have extended some rights of marriage to same-sex couples
- Ontario Toxics Reduction Act (2009)
- Saskatchewan Grain Car Corporation Amendment Act (2011)

== United States ==
- the city charter which created the city of Cape Canaveral, Florida (1961)
