= SWIX =

Swix or SWIX may refer to:

- Swix (company), a Norwegian skiing goods and sports clothes company
- Star Wars: The Rise of Skywalker (SW:IX), a 2019 film which is the third and final installment of the sequel trilogy
- Swiks a.k.a. "Swix" (sank 1926), a three-masted schooner
- SWIX, the markup language, see List of user interface markup languages
- Stonewall Industries (SWIX), see List of reporting marks: S

== See also ==
- SW9 (disambiguation)
