= William H. Woodin =

American politician

William Woodin
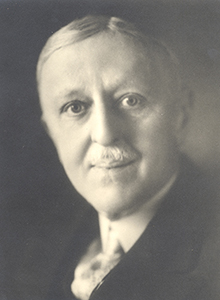

51st United States Secretary of the Treasury
- In office March 5, 1933 – December 31, 1933
- President: Franklin D. Roosevelt
- Preceded by: Ogden L. Mills
- Succeeded by: Henry Morgenthau Jr.

Personal details
- Born: William Hartman Woodin; May 27, 1868 Berwick, Pennsylvania, U.S.
- Died: May 3, 1934 (aged 65) New York City, New York, U.S.
- Party: Republican
- Spouse: Annie Jessup
- Children: 4
- Education: Columbia University (BS)

William Hartman Woodin (May 27, 1868 – May 3, 1934) was a U.S. industrialist. He served as the Secretary of Treasury under Franklin Roosevelt in 1933.

== Biography ==
Woodin was born in Berwick, Pennsylvania. He was closely involved in Jackson and Woodin Manufacturing Company. His father, Clemuel Ricketts "Clement" Woodin, preceded him in the presidency of the company and his grandfather, also named William Hartman Woodin, was an early partner in the company. He was a member of the Union League Club of New York. Woodin graduated from the Columbia College School of Mines in 1890.

Jackson & Woodin grew under this combined leadership to become the largest railroad car builder in the eastern United States, and was one of the 13 companies that merged in 1899 to form American Car and Foundry Company (ACF).

Woodin married Annie Jessup, on October 9, 1889. They had three daughters and one son: Mary, Annie Jessup, William Hartman Jr., and Elizabeth Foster Woodin. They lived in New York City.

Woodin stayed on with ACF for a while after the merger.

Woodin worked up through ACF management to become president in 1916. He was a director of several other companies including: chairman of the board of American Locomotive Company, chairman of the board of Railway Steel Spring Company, a director of Remington Arms Company, a director of Montreal Locomotive Works, and a director of American Ship and Commerce Company. He was a director of the Federal Reserve Bank of New York from 1927 through 1932.

As Will Woodin, he collaborated with children's author Johnny Gruelle, composing music for the 1930 book Raggedy Ann's Sunny Songs and was the namesake of Gruelle's character Little Wooden Willie. In 1933, Woodin composed a march in honor of Roosevelt.

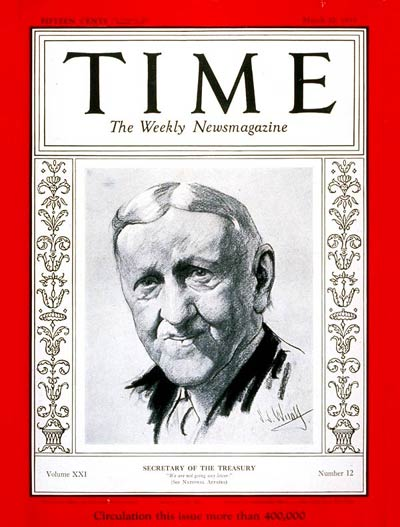
Secretary of the Treasury 'William H. Woodin, (1933 Time)

Woodin was a Republican businessman, but was a major contributor to Roosevelt's campaign in 1932. Woodin served as the Treasury Secretary from March 4, 1933, until he resigned effective December 31, 1933. Because of his poor health, for some weeks in 1933 Treasury Under-Secretary Dean Acheson served as the Acting Secretary of the Treasury. Woodin was involved in major decisions that the new Roosevelt administration made to combat the Great Depression.

On March 4, 1933, when Roosevelt first took the oath of office, banks were closing their doors all over the United States as waves of panic led depositors to demand immediate payment of their money. Woodin was the point man in the administration's declaration of a "Bank Holiday" which closed every bank in the U.S. until bank examiners could determine which were sound enough to re-open. With "seals of approval" from the examiners, depositors regained confidence, and the vast majority left their money in bank deposits. This preceded the creation of deposit insurance and the Federal Deposit Insurance Corporation with the passage of the Glass-Steagall Act of 1933.

Woodin also presided over the Roosevelt Administration's withdrawal from the international monetary conference in London and the decision to take the United States off the international gold standard there. While he was the Secretary of the Treasury, the Administration also began the decision-making process that eventually led to the administration's decision to buy all the gold in private hands in the United States (other than that used by dentists and jewelers) and then to raise the dollar price of gold, devaluing the dollar against gold.

Treasury Under Secretary Dean Acheson opposed FDR on the latter two decisions and was forced to resign in November 1933. Woodin was an avid coin collector and when gold was withdrawn from private hands, he made certain that an exception was put in place for "rare or unusual" coins.

From 1930 until 1934 he was a trustee of Lafayette College.

He died in New York City, New York, and was buried in Pine Grove Cemetery, near his birthplace of Berwick, Pennsylvania.

Woodin is the great-grandfather of mathematician W. Hugh Woodin.

Political offices
Preceded by Ogden L. Mills	U.S. Secretary of the Treasury; Served under: Franklin D. Roosevelt; March 5 – December 31, 1933	Succeeded by Henry Morgenthau Jr.
