= Uri Gilbert =

American politician

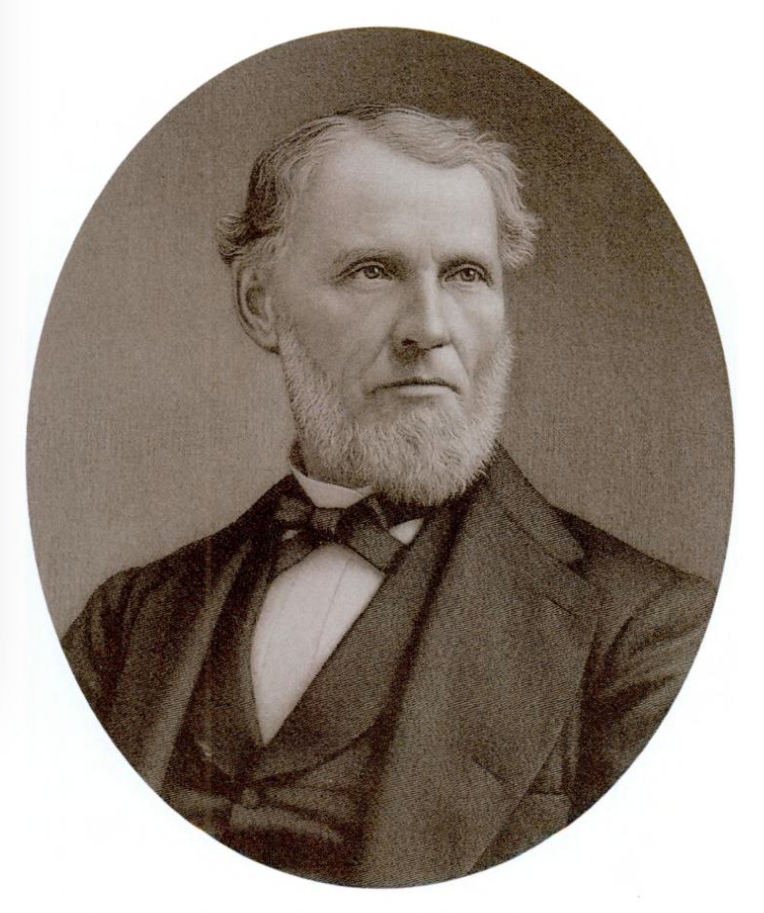

Mayor of Troy, New York
- In office 1865–1866

Mayor of Troy, New York
- In office 1870–1871

Personal details
- Born: July 10, 1809 Northumberland, Saratoga County, New York, U.S.
- Died: June 17, 1888 (aged 78) Saratoga, New York, U.S.
- Resting place: Oakwood Cemetery, Troy, New York, U.S.
- Party: Whig (early); Republican (later)
- Children: 5
- Occupation: Carriage maker, politician
- Known for: Founder of Gilbert Car Company; helping free escaped slave Charles Nalle

Uri Gilbert (July 10, 1809–June 17, 1888) was an American carriage maker from Troy, New York, making both passenger and freight cars. He was apprenticed at the age of 14 to learn the carriage-building trade. At the end of his apprenticeship he became partner with Oramus Eaton of the Eaton & Gilbert Company. He kept pace with technological advancements and expanded the business by the time Eaton retired and Gilbert established the Gilbert Car Company. The companies produced passenger trolley and railroad cars, freight cars, and during the American Civil War, gun carriages. He entered politics in the 1840s becoming alderman and the mayor of Troy. Gilbert was active in many for-profit and civic organizations over the course of his life. He employed Charles Nalle as a coachman and when he was arrested due to the Fugitive Slave Law, he helped free him.

== Early life and apprenticeship ==
Uri Gilbert was born on July 10, 1809 in Northumberland, Saratoga County, New York. His father was John Gilbert, an Episcopalian minister, from Connecticut. At the age of 14 he became an apprentice of Orasmus Eaton, a carriage builder, in Troy.

== Carriage maker ==
After he completed his apprenticeship in 1830, Gilbert partnered with his employer to form Eaton & Gilbert. Eaton had an excellent reputation as a conscientious and skilled craftsman. Gilbert, on the other hand, became an expert by the time he completed his apprenticeship.

The company made trolley and train cars and omnibuses. They built mail coaches, called Troy Stages, that became especially popular as a means of travel as well as a mail coach in the southern and westerns United States. Their street cars made to be drawn by horses were built for Boston, New York and other large cities.

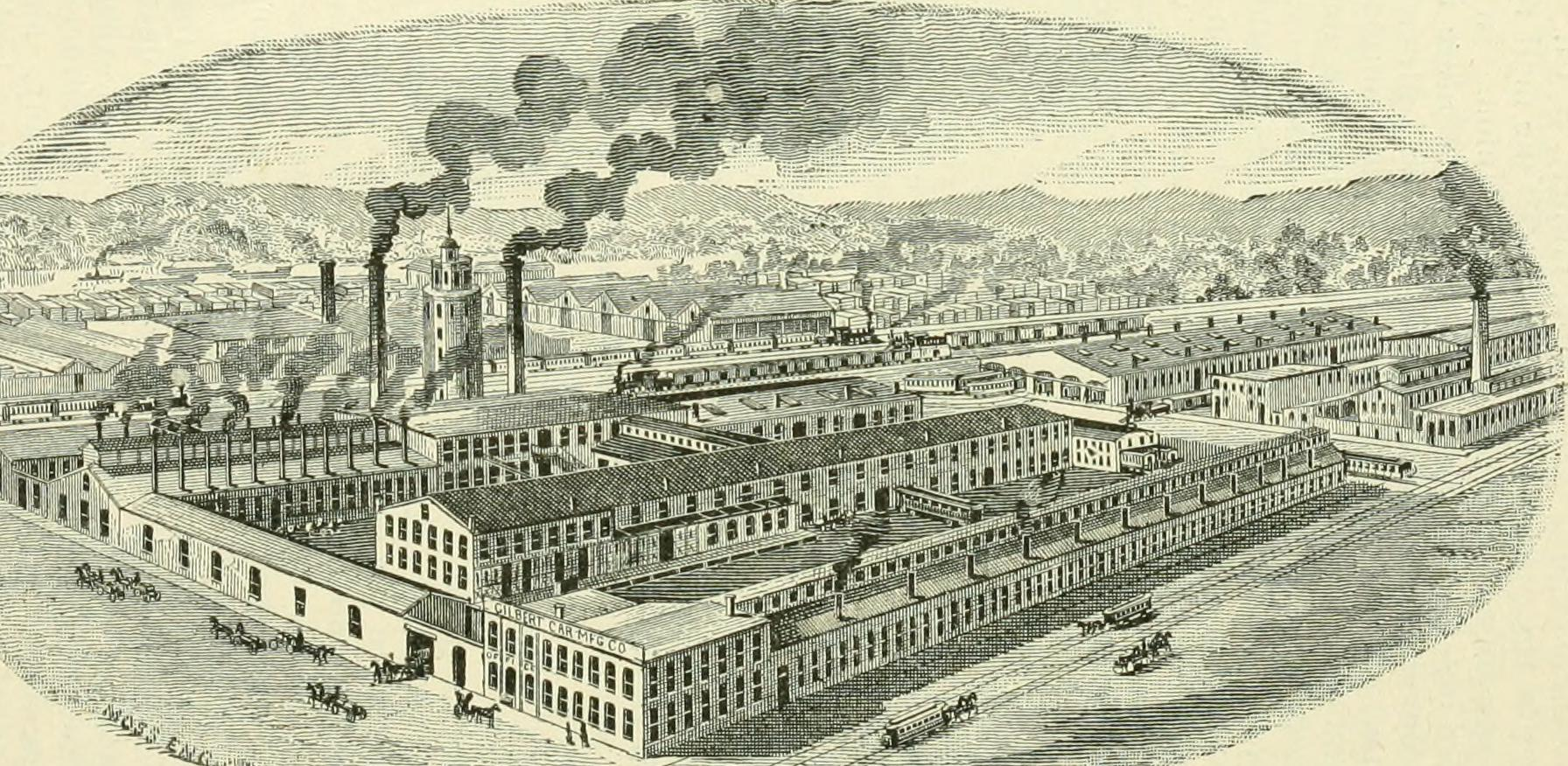
Eaton, Gilbert & Co. / Gilbert Car Manufacturing

The plant was moved to Green Island, New York, near Troy, in 1853 due to a fire in 1852. It is also said that in 1853 the company had grown large enough that it needed a larger plant.

During the Civil War (1861–1865) the firm made 500 gun carriages for the Union. Eaton retired in 1862 and the company name changed to the Gilbert Car Company. Two years later, Walter R. Bush became Gilbert's partner. There was a fire in 1864 that caused quite a bit of damage. Bush and Gilbert had the car works rebuilt and outfitted with modern technology. The Gilbert Car Trust was established in 1879 that provided financing for railroad cars. Troy & Schenectady Railroad hired them to build the first eight-wheel passenger car. The company produced luxurious equipment for the Wagner Sleeping Car Company. Its export business was a large share of its revenue. Over the course of its history, the company name changed with the changes in partners, including the partner's sons.

== Political and other ventures ==
He began his career in politics in 1840. He was an alderman for the city of Troy for several years. He was a mayor of the city from 1865 to 1866 and again from 1870 to 1871. Gilbert was originally a member of the Whig Party, but joined the Republican Party with its formation.

He was the first president of the Troy Savings Bank, established June 29, 1854. He was a director of the United National Bank of Troy, the Polytechnic Institute of Troy, and the Orphan asylum. He was a founder and, for a time, president of the Troy Young Men’s association. He was a governor of Marshall infirmary. He was a trustee for the Troy Female Seminary. He was on the first board of managers for The Troy Club, a social club for the city's wealthy and influential citizens. It was established in 1867.

== Personal life ==
Uri Gilbert married Frances Harriet Granger. They had two sons, William and Edward, and two daughters. They also had a son Joseph who died young. Gilbert and his wife, who were members of St. John's Episcopal Church, donated a carved chancel chair in his memory.

Gilbert died of heart failure on June 17, 1888, in Saratoga, New York, where he and his family rented a house for the summer. He is buried at Oakwood Cemetery in Troy. Frances died December 6, 1889, at Troy.

=== The Uri Gilbert House ===
The Uri Gilbert House, an Italianate-style brownstone, was sold to Gilbert in 1856, a few years after it was built. The house is nearly 10,000 square feet with 26 rooms. Located within the Central Troy Historic District, it faces Washington Park, one of the three privately owned urban parks in New York. (Note: Gilbert houses near one another on Second and Third Avenue: 111 Second, Frank Gilbert, paper manufacturer; 165 Second, William Gilbert, Gilbert Car Manufacturing Co.; 189 Second, Uri Gilbert; 235 Second, Elizabeth Gilbert, teacher; 212 Third, Edward Gilbert, Gilbert Car Manufacturing Co.) It is described as a three-story rowhouse with a five-bay Brownstone façade. It has an "elaborate cast-iron bracketed balcony" and a 19th-century carriage house. It was featured in the film The Age of Innocence (1993).

== Charles Nalle's freedom ==
Charles Nalle escaped from slavery in the South in October 1858 and came to Troy with the help of the Underground Railroad. He worked as a coachman for Gilbert for almost two years. He told someone of his escape and his story was ultimately shared with his former enslaver in Culpeper, Virginia. Nalle was arrested under the Fugitive Slave Law. In 1860, Harriet Tubman and others rescued him, and Gilbert helped pay for his freedom. Once a free man, Nalle returned to Troy and had a family.
