= Gilbert Car Company =

Rolling stock manufacturer

- Industry: rail transport
- Founded: 1830
- Defunct: 1895
- Fate: receivership and liquidation
- Headquarters: Troy, New York, United States
- Products: railroad freight cars, passenger cars and streetcars

Gilbert Car Company was a railroad car builder based in Troy, New York. It began manufacturing streetcars in the late 1880s. Gilbert cars were sold and exported worldwide.

Founded by Orsamus Eaton (1792–1872) and Uri Gilbert (1809–1888), the company changed names several times as the partnership changed:

- 1830 Eaton and Gilbert
- 1844 Eaton, Gilbert & Co
- 1862 Uri Gilbert and Son
- 1864 Gilbert, Bush & Company

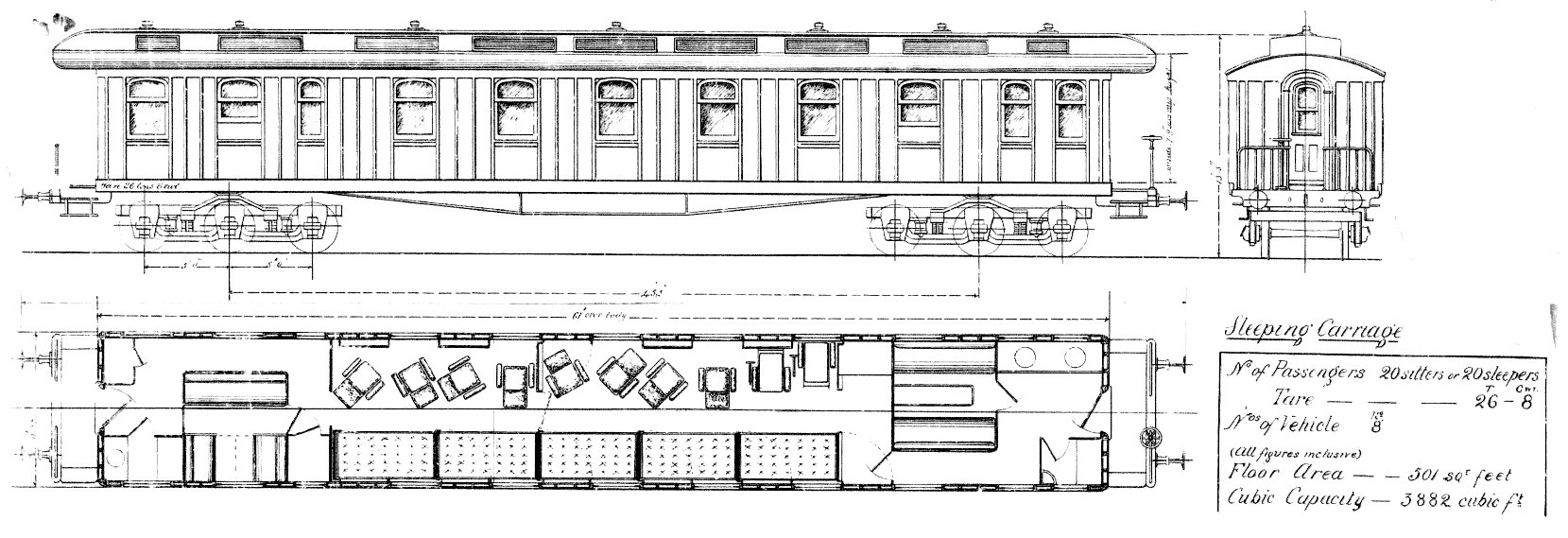
Diagram of NSWGR Sleeping Car 8, built in 1880 by Gilbert Bush & Co.

- 1879 Gilbert & Bush Co
- 1882 Gilbert Car Manufacturing Co
- 1889 Taylor Electric Truck Company

In 1879, Gilbert leased the Buffalo Car Works facility in Buffalo, which had a capacity of five to twelve new cars per day. The Gilbert company saw some success in 1881 when it secured an order for several hundred refrigerator cars for the newly established American Refrigerator Transit Company. In 1886, Gilbert leased the Jones Car Works of Schenectady.

Following the Panic of 1893, and the death in March 1893 of company president Edward Gilbert, son of Uri Gilbert, the company entered receivership in August 1893. Only a few months earlier, Gilbert had completed construction of a hundred cars for New York Central Railroad passenger trains. Then in 1895, the company stopped building rail cars. Upon closure, the plant value was estimated at $400,000 (equivalent to $15,118,400 in 2024). In 1899, the plant was rumored to be the target of acquisition for conversion into an automobile manufacturing facility.

== Products ==
- freight cars
- passenger cars
- drawing room cars
- sleepers
- monitor roof or clerestory ("clear-story") cars
- horse cars

== See also ==
- List of rolling stock manufacturers
