= Charles Nalle =

American escapee from slavery

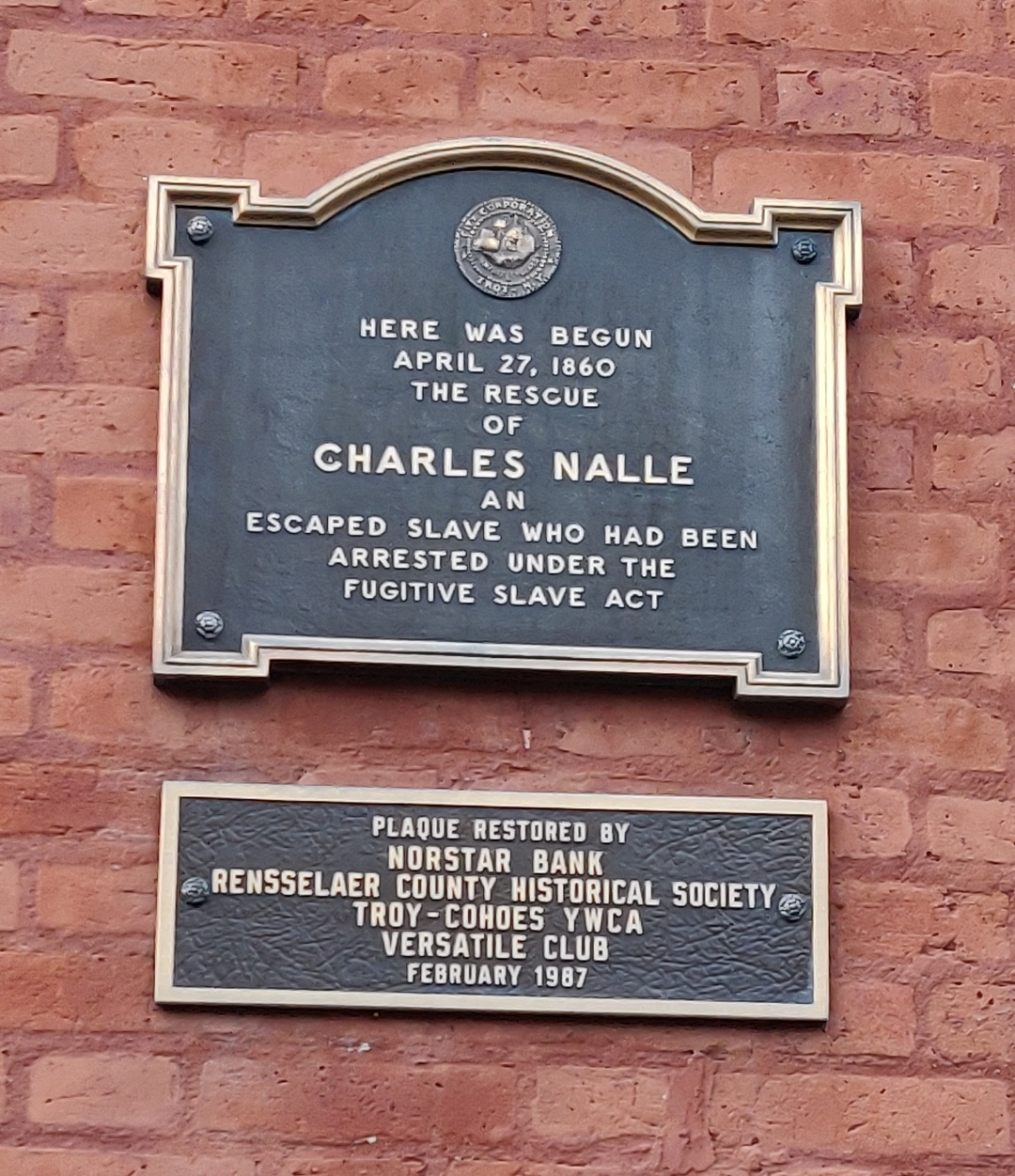
Plaque in downtown Troy at the intersection of State St. and 1st St.

Charles Nalle (c. 1821–1875) was born in Stevensburg, Virginia in about 1821 into slavery. At the age of 16, he was given to a Virginia plantation owner, Blucher Hansbrough. Nalle and another enslaved man, Jim Banks, made their escape from the plantation in October 1858 during an auction.

Helped by the Underground Railroad, Nalle settled in Troy, New York where he worked as a coachman and groom for the wife of a wealthy Rensselaer man, Uri Gilbert, in Troy at the time. On April 27, 1860, Nalle was turned in to the local authorities. According to the Fugitive Slave Act of 1850, he was arrested and slated to be sent back to slavery in Virginia. As word got out, a large crowd gathered around the Mutual Building in Troy where he was being held. Nalle managed to escape across the Hudson River to West Troy (modern-day Watervliet) during a clash between authorities and the crowd which included Harriet Tubman, but the authorities were waiting for him on the other side and once again arrested him. Another clash occurred in West Troy, and during this time locals raised enough money for Nalle to be freed. His freedom was bought for 650 U.S dollars.

Nalle spent most of the Civil War in Troy. He had several children with his wife, Kitty. He died in 1875 in Washington D.C. of heart disease.

== Legacy ==
The events surrounding Nalle are recognized and commemorated by both the Watervliet Historical Society and the Rensselaer Historical Society. In 2010, Watervliet celebrated the 150th anniversary of the rescue of Nalle.
