= SW9 =

SW9 may refer to:

- EMD SW9, a locomotive
- South West 9, a 2001 British film
- Star Wars: The Rise of Skywalker, also known as Star Wars Episode IX
- SW9, the London postcode, see SW postcode area
- Southwest No. 9 Boundary Marker of the Original District of Columbia

== See also ==
- SWIX (disambiguation)
