= Buffalo Car Manufacturing Company =

Rolling stock manufacturer

- Company type: private
- Industry: rail transport
- Founded: 1872
- Headquarters: Buffalo, NY, United States
- Products: freight cars

Buffalo Car Manufacturing Company, also known as Buffalo Car Company or Buffalo Car Works, was an American manufacturer of railroad freight cars in the late 19th century. In 1899, this company was merged with twelve others to form American Car and Foundry Company.

== History ==
=== Buffalo Car Works (1853–1857) ===
Buffalo Car Works was founded in 1853 in Black Rock, New York by D.J. Townsend and George Coit, Jr. to build railroad cars. By 1854, the company had also adopted the name "Buffalo Car Company". By 1856, its plant on land between the New York Central Railroad's main line through Buffalo and the Niagara River encompassed 15 buildings. During the Panic of 1857, the company experienced a financial failure and was sold off by the government.

=== Buffalo Car Manufacturing Company (1872–1899) ===
The newer company was founded as the Buffalo Car Company in 1872 by William Williams. The company's facility in Buffalo was leased by the Gilbert Car Company in 1879. Buffalo merged with Niagara Car Wheel Company in 1890. The consolidated company became known as Buffalo Car Manufacturing Company and entered into a business relationship with Union Car Company, based in Depew, New York. Buffalo and Union were both operated independently for the next decade despite their business relationship and their manufacturing shops being located in relatively close proximity to each other.

In 1895, Buffalo was awarded a contract, valued at $900,000, from New York Central Railroad to build its most expensive freight cars to date with an order for 1,500 boxcars. The cars were to feature air brakes, automatic couplers and all-steel trucks. Buffalo was awarded another lucrative contract in 1898 to build 500 hopper cars for the Lake Shore and Michigan Southern Railway; although the cars included drop doors to unload the cars through the floor, the cars were intended to be used in conjunction with a car dumper that would unload the car through end doors directly into the hold of a coal-fired ship.

=== American Car and Foundry Company ===
In 1899, Buffalo and twelve other companies, including Union Car Company, were merged to form American Car and Foundry Company (ACF). The former Buffalo plant was used during World War I to manufacture munitions for the war. ACF closed the Buffalo plant in 1931 and then reopened it in 1940 to produce munitions for World War II; the plant closed again after the war and reopened again in 1951 to produce parts needed for nuclear weapons. ACF closed the Buffalo plant permanently in 1954.
