= Jackson and Woodin Manufacturing Company =

Rolling stock manufacturer

Jackson & Woodin Manufacturing Company
- Company type: private
- Industry: rail transport
- Founded: 1840
- Founder: Mordecai W. Jackson and George Mack
- Headquarters: Berwick, Pennsylvania, United States
- Products: freight cars
- Total assets: $60 million (1899)

Jackson & Woodin Manufacturing Company, also called Jackson & Woodin Car Works, was an American railroad freight car manufacturing company of the late 19th century headquartered in Berwick, Pennsylvania. In 1899, Jackson and Woodin was merged with twelve other freight car manufacturing companies to form American Car & Foundry Company. Jackson and Woodin's management were proponents of the temperance movement in America, and went as far as buying all the saloons and hotels in Berwick, leading to Berwick becoming a dry town by 1881. By the time of the 1899 merger that created American Car and Foundry Company (ACF), Jackson & Woodin was the largest freight car manufacturer in the eastern United States. The Jackson & Woodin shops became ACF's Berwick Plant, a plant that was heavily used by ACF.

== History ==
Jackson & Woodin was founded in 1840 by Mordecai W. Jackson and George Mack as a farm implement manufacturing company. Jackson bought Mack's interest in the company in 1843, and partnered with Robert McCurdy, whose interest Jackson bought later in 1846. William Hartman Woodin partnered with Jackson in 1849. The company turned to construction of mine cars by the late 1860s.

The Jackson & Woodin shops were destroyed by fire on March 17, 1865; the company rebuilt with a larger facility in the same location, increasing the size of its workforce from 150 to 250.

After Mordecai Jackson and William Woodin retired from the company, Jackson & Woodin incorporated on March 1, 1872 with Clement R. Woodin (sometimes written as Clemuel Woodin, William Woodin's son) appointed as president, Clarence G. Jackson (Mordecai Jackson's son) as vice president and Garrick Mallery as treasurer. The company's partners, Mordecai Jackson and William Woodin, were appointed to the executive committee. C. R. Woodin helped the company grow throughout his time in its top position; an 1879 advertisement for Jackson & Woodin declared that the company was producing 150 railroad car wheels per day.

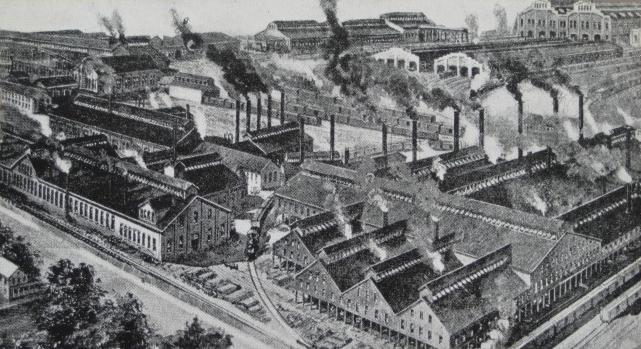
Berwick steel car plant in 1906

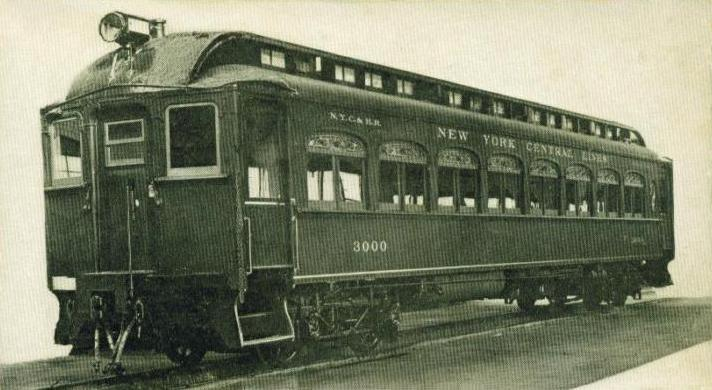
The first all-steel passenger car

Also in 1879, Jackson & Woodin helped with the establishment of the local YMCA chapter, donating the entire third floor of the company's main building (including rent, heat and light) as meeting space. When YMCA of Berwick was incorporated in 1883, the majority of the organization's trustees were current executives of Jackson & Woodin.

C. R. Woodin stepped down from the company presidency in 1894 due to poor health. Clement Woodin's son, William Hartman Woodin, who would later make a name for himself as the Secretary of the Treasury under Franklin D. Roosevelt, served as general superintendent of Jackson & Woodin, and was promoted to president of the firm in 1895.

In 1899, Jackson & Woodin was one of 13 car manufacturers that were merged to create American Car & Foundry Company (ACF). By the time of the merger, Jackson & Woodin was the largest freight car manufacturer in the eastern United States, with total assets of $60,000,000. The Jackson & Woodin shops became ACF's Berwick Plant, a plant that was heavily used by ACF. ACF produced the first all-steel passenger car at the Berwick Plant in 1904; it was the first car produced as part of an order for 300 cars from the Interborough Rapid Transit company in New York City.

ACF's Berwick Plant remained open for passenger car assembly until January 1961, when the last NYCT IRT R28s were delivered.
