= American Industrial Transport =

American manufacturerof freight cars

- Type: Private
- Traded as: Nasdaq: ARII
- Founded: 1988; 38 years ago
- Founder: American Railcar Industries
- Parent: ITE Management
- Website: aitx.com

American Industrial Transport, a business formerly known as American Railcar Industries, is a specialist in railcar leasing and repair, headquartered in Saint Charles, Missouri. AITX, both the name and primary railcar mark, leases railcars in the covered hopper and specialized tank car markets.

== History ==
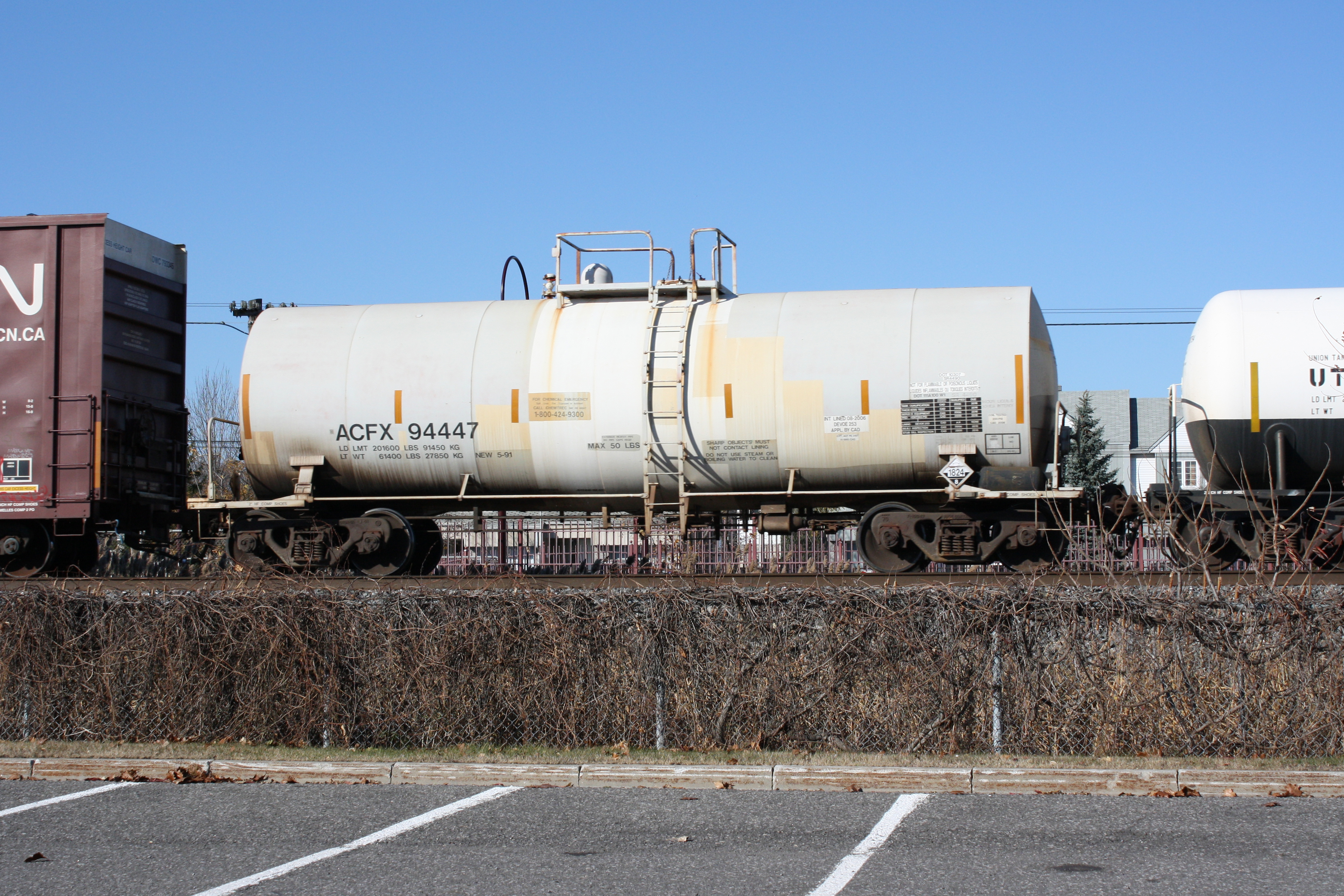
A tank car from American Industrial Transport.

American Railcar Industries (ARI) was formed in 1988 and grew in railcar repair as a result of acquiring business assets from ACF Industries. At that time ARI manufactured components for railcars, and also provided painting, repair and fleet management services. By 1999, the company was manufacturing both hopper and tank cars.

In December 2018 the business was purchased by ITE Management. In April 2019 it was announced the manufacturing assets had been sold to The Greenbrier Companies. ITE continues to own the maintenance and leasing businesses In July 2020, it was rebranded American Industrial Transport.

In 2023, the business acquired SMBC Rail Services LLC and folded it into its own operations.

== American Industrial Transport Leasing ==
AITX leases and manages over 16,000 tanks and covered hopper cars serving the petroleum, chemical, food, agriculture, fertilizer and plastic pellet markets.

The tank cars are used for a variety of liquid and liquified gas commodities such as vegetable oils, asphalt, various chemicals, LPGs and petroleum products. AITX's covered hopper cars are used for transporting commodities such as grains, plastic pellets, flour, sugar and various minerals.

Headquartered in Saint Charles, a suburb of St Louis, Missouri.

== American Industrial Transport Repair ==
AITX facilitates seven full service repair shops, in Brookhaven, Mississippi, Bude, Mississippi, Goodrich, Texas, Longview, Texas, North Kansas City, Missouri, Sarnia, Ontario, and Tennille, Georgia

AITX also runs numerous mobile locations in Emmetsburg, Iowa, Gonzales, Louisiana, Hastings, Nebraska, Hudson, Colorado, LaPorte, Texas, and Mounds, Illinois.
