= American Car and Foundry Company =

Manufacturer of railroad rolling stock

Coordinates: 38.7848658°N 90.4808884°W

ACF Industries LLC
- Formerly: ACF Industries, Inc.
- Industry: Manufacturing
- Founded: 1815; 211 years ago (Partial); 1899; 127 years ago (As American Car And Foundry Company
- Defunct: 2019
- Fate: Acquired
- Successor: The Greenbrier Companies; American Industrial Transport
- Headquarters: St. Charles, Missouri, U.S.
- Area served: Worldwide
- Products: Building and leasing freight cars Formerly manufactured: Passenger cars; Rapid transit cars; Railcars; Streetcars (through J. G. Brill Company); Buses; Military equipment (during World War I and World War II)

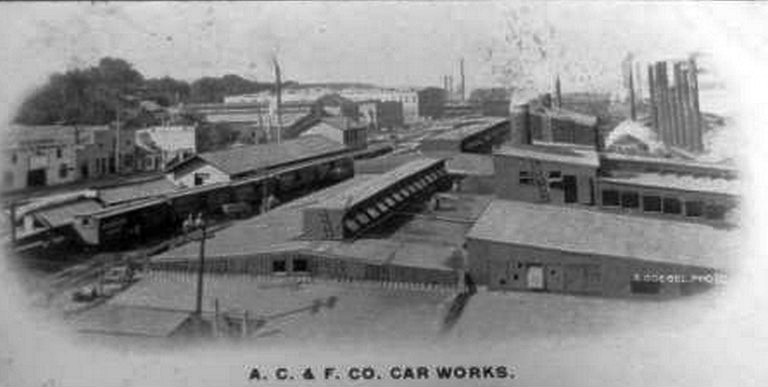
A 1907 postcard depicting the ACF plant in St. Charles, Missouri

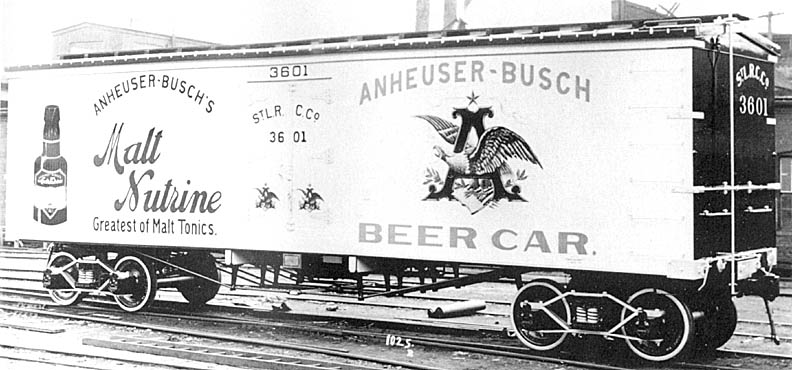
A refrigerator car built by ACF in 1911

ACF Industries, originally the American Car and Foundry Company (abbreviated as ACF), was an American manufacturer of railroad rolling stock. One of its subsidiaries was once (1925–54) a manufacturer of motor coaches and trolley coaches under the brand names of (first) ACF and (later) ACF-Brill. Today, the company's manufacturing assets are owned by The Greenbrier Companies, while the sales and leasing and repair businesses are owned by American Industrial Transport.

== History ==
The American Car and Foundry Company was originally formed and incorporated in New Jersey in 1899 as a result of the merger of thirteen smaller railroad car manufacturers:

| Company | Founded | Location |
|---|---|---|
| Buffalo Car Manufacturing Company | 1872 | Buffalo, New York |
| Ensign Manufacturing Company | 1872 | Huntington, West Virginia |
| Jackson and Woodin Manufacturing Company | 1840 | Berwick, Pennsylvania |
| Michigan-Peninsular Car Company | 1892 | Detroit, Michigan |
| Minerva Car Works | 1882 | Minerva, Ohio |
| Missouri Car and Foundry Company | 1865 | St. Louis, Missouri |
| Murray, Dougal and Company | 1864 | Milton, Pennsylvania |
| Niagara Car Wheel Company | | Buffalo, New York |
| Ohio Falls Car Company | 1876 | Jeffersonville, Indiana |
| St. Charles Car Company | 1873 | St. Charles, Missouri |
| Terre Haute Car and Manufacturing Company | | Terre Haute, Indiana |
| Union Car Company | | Depew, New York |
| Wells and French Company | 1869 | Chicago, Illinois |

Later in 1899, ACF acquired the Bloomsburg Car Manufacturing Company of Bloomsburg, Pennsylvania. Orders for new freight cars were made very quickly, with several hundred cars ordered in the first year alone. Two years later, ACF acquired the Jackson and Sharp Company (founded 1863 in Wilmington, Delaware) and the Common Sense Bolster Company (of Chicago, Illinois). The unified company made a large investment in the former Jackson & Woodin plant in Pennsylvania, spending about $3 million. It was at this plant that ACF built the first all-steel passenger car in the world in 1904. The car was built for the Interborough Rapid Transit system of New York City, the first of 300 such cars ordered by that system.

In 1903, the company was operating overseas in Trafford Park, Manchester, England, and it was featured on a Triumphal Arch built for the Royal Visit of Edward VII and Queen Alexandra in 1903. The factory buildings were later used by Ford cars, which began manufacturing at Trafford Park in 1911.

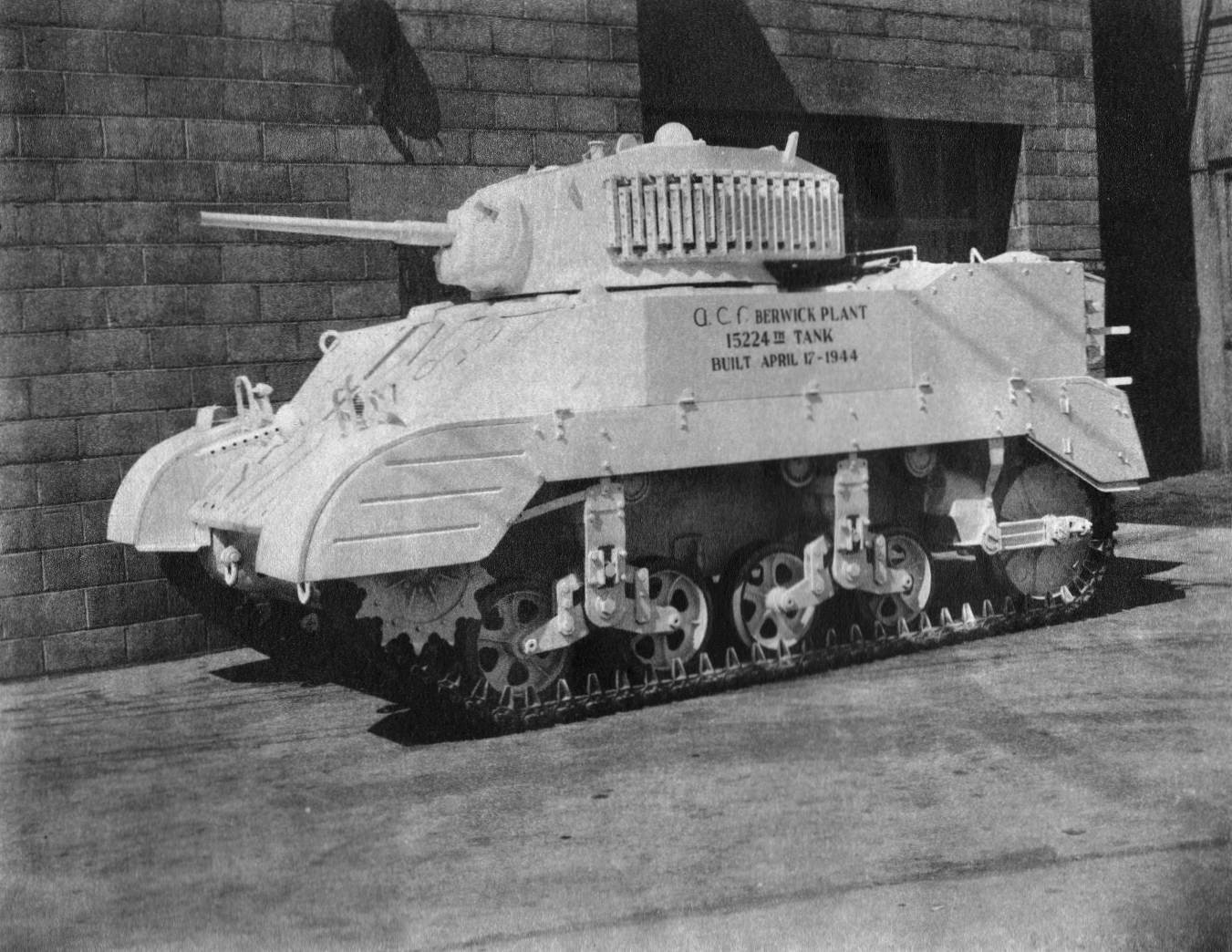
An M5A1, the last tank, of 15,244, built at ACF's Berwick plant that rolled off the production line on April 17, 1944

1904 and 1905 saw ACF build several motor cars and trailers for the London Underground. In those two years, ACF also acquired the Southern Car and Foundry (founded 1899 in Memphis, Tennessee), Indianapolis Car and Foundry, and Indianapolis Car Company.

In 1916, William H. Woodin, formerly president of Jackson and Woodin Manufacturing Company, was promoted to become president of ACF. Woodin would later become Secretary of the Treasury under U.S. President Franklin Roosevelt.

During World War I, ACF produced artillery gun mounts and ammunition, submarine chasers and other boats, railway cars, and other equipment to support the Allies. ACF ranked 36th among United States corporations in the value of World War II production contracts.

In World War 2, ACF produced tanks and bulldozers for the military. The Berwick plant constructed over 15,000 tanks between 1940 and 1944.

== Timeline ==
- 1899: American Car and Foundry (ACF) is formed from the merger of 13 smaller companies
- 1899: ACF acquires Bloomsburg Car Manufacturing Company
- 1901: ACF acquires Jackson and Sharp Company and Common Sense Bolster Company
- 1904: ACF builds the first all-steel passenger car in the world for the Interborough Rapid Transit
- 1904: ACF acquires Southern Car and Foundry of Memphis, Tennessee
- 1905: ACF acquires Indianapolis Car and Foundry and Indianapolis Car Company
- 1922: ACF diversifies into the automotive industry with the acquisition of Carter Carburetor Corporation
- March 31, 1924: ACF acquires Pacific Car and Foundry from William Pigott
- October 31, 1925: ACF forms "American Car and Foundry Securities Corporation" (A wholly owned subsidiary holding company) for the purpose of acquiring Fageol Motors Company of Ohio and Hall-Scott Motor Car Company Fageol Motors Company of California was included but was not approved by the shareholders.
- 1926: ACF acquires J. G. Brill Company
- 1926: ACF acquires American Motor Body Corporation
- 1927: ACF acquires Shippers Car Line
- 1934: Paul Pigott reinstates a controlling interest of Pacific Car and Foundry
- 1935: ACF builds lightweight Rebel streamline trains for the Gulf, Mobile and Northern Railroad
- 1939: ACF's Berwick plant switches to construction of military tanks.
- 1940: Brill is fully merged into ACF.
- August 2, 1941: ACF's 1,000th military tank is completed for the United States military effort of World War II
- 1954: The company officially changes its name to ACF Industries, Incorporated.
- 1954: ACF purchases Engineering and Research Corporation.
- 1954–1955: ACF delivers 35 "Astra Dome" dome cars to the Union Pacific Railroad.
- January 1961: ACF delivers its last passenger car, (NYCT IRT R28. IRT car), Berwick plant closed, sold, to later re-open as Berwick Forge & Fabricating Corporation.
- 1977: Southern Pacific Railroad (SP) came up with the idea of the first double-stack intermodal car in 1977. SP then designed the first car with ACF Industries that same year.
- 1984: ACF is purchased by Carl Icahn.
- 1988: Spin-off company American Railcar Industries (ARI) is founded.
- 1997: ACF reaches a leasing agreement with GE Capital Railcar for 35,000 of its 46,000 railcars, mostly on 16-year leases with optional purchase agreements.
- 2003: ACF Industries LLC became a successor to ACF Industries, Incorporated on May 1, 2003.
- 2008: An ACF Center Flow hopper owned by CSX Transportation fails. A Federal Railroad Administration advisory released the following year notes the failure occurred in the car's side sill and corrective action for all ACF Center Flow hoppers.
- 2016: The ACF-300 stub sill design used by both ACF and ARI is investigated for non-conforming welds by the Federal Railroad Administration due to a series of tank car failures.
- 2018: ARI is sold from the Icahn group.
- 2019: Production at the ACF Milton, Pennsylvania plant ceases.
- 2019: ARI's manufacturing arm is purchased by The Greenbrier Companies. The remaining railcar leasing and management business is rebranded as American Industrial Transport (AITX) the following year.

== Products ==
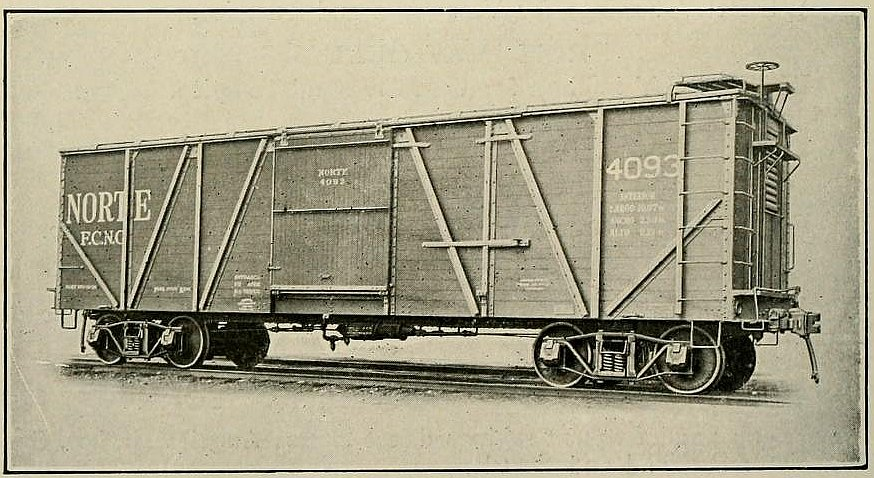
External-braced wooden boxcar built for sugar service in Cuba by ACF, c. 1922

In the past, ACF built passenger and freight cars, including covered hopper cars for hauling such cargo as corn and other grains. One of the largest customers was the Union Pacific Railroad, whose armour-yellow carbon-steel lightweight passenger rolling stock was mostly built by ACF. The famous dome-observation car "Native Son" was an ACF product.

Another important ACF railroad production were the passenger cars of the Missouri River "Eagle", a Missouri Pacific streamliner put in service in March 1940. This train, in its original shape, consisted of six cars including one baggage, one baggage-mail, two coaches one food and beverage car and finally the observation lounge-parlor car. All the passenger equipment was styled by industrial designer Raymond Loewy.

Today, the U.S. passenger car market is erratic in production and is mostly handled by specialty manufacturers and foreign corporations. Competitors Budd, Pullman-Standard, Rohr Industries, and the St. Louis Car Company have all either left the market or gone out of business.

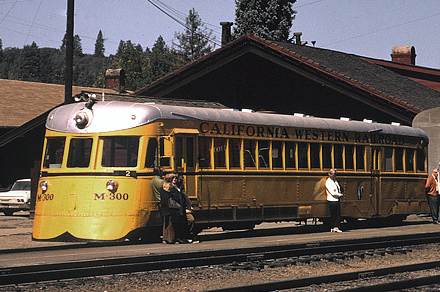
ACF railcar M-300, built in 1935, on the California Western Railroad in 1970

The manufacturing facility in Milton, Pennsylvania, was served by the Norfolk Southern Railway and was capable of manufacturing railcars and all related railcar components. The plant was capable of producing pressure vessels in sizes 18,000–61,000 gwc, including propane tanks, compressed gas storage, LPG storage, and all related components, including heads. The plant, covering 48 acres, provided 500,000 square feet of covered work area and seven miles of storage tracks. The plant ceased production in 2019. The Huntington, West Virginia, production site ceased production in late 2009, and was demolished in 2021.

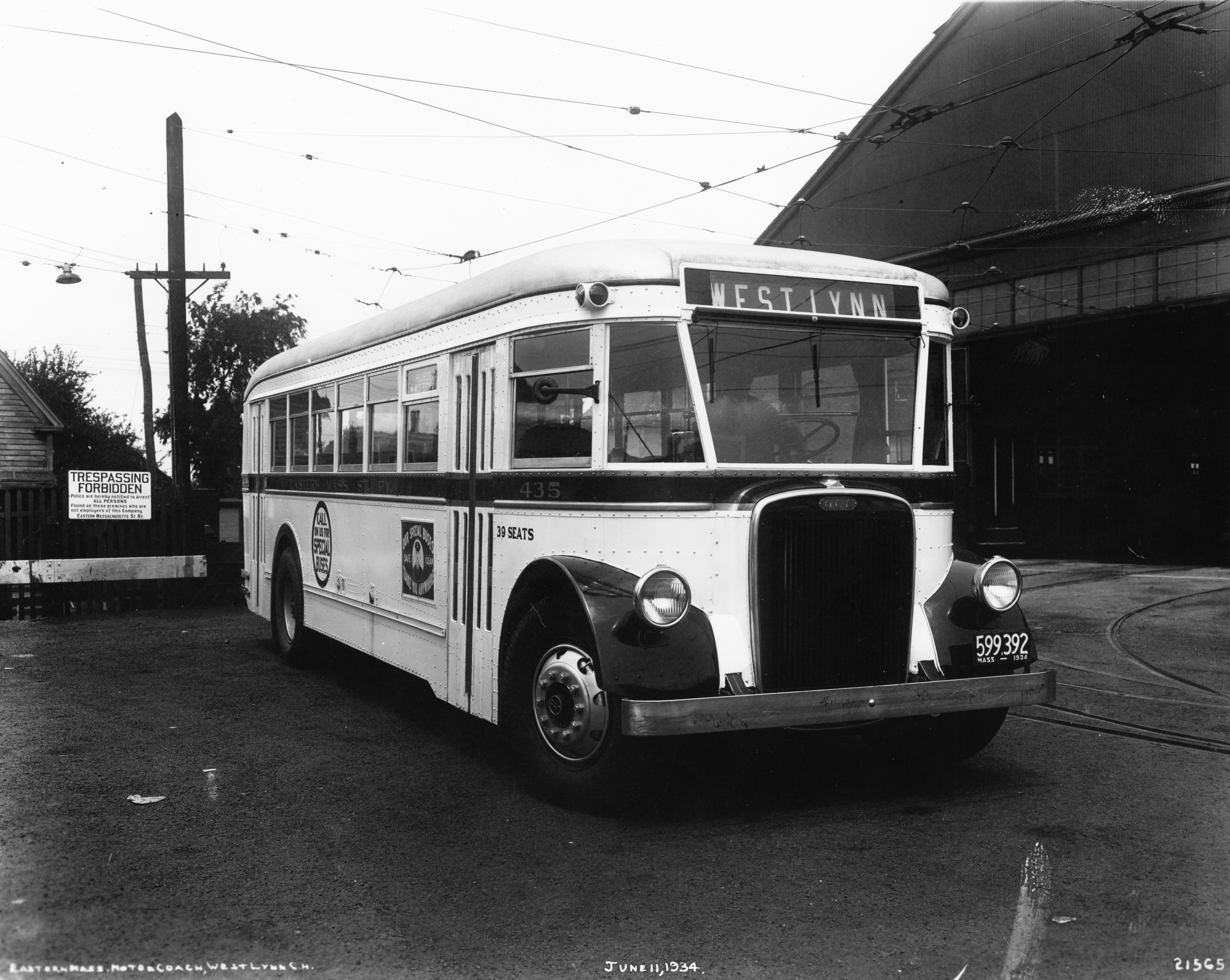
ACF Omnibus 1934

Omnibus

| Year | Model | Passenger |
|---|---|---|
| 1927 | 508D | 26 |
| | 508D | 30 |
| | 510F | 60 |
| | 519D | 31 |
| | 519F | 60 |
| | 601D | 23 |
| | 601B | 21 |
| 1928 | 508D | 26 |
| | 508D | 30 |
| | 510F | 60 |
| | 519D | 31 |
| | 519F | 60 |
| | 601D | 23 |
| | 601B | 21 |

== Gallery ==
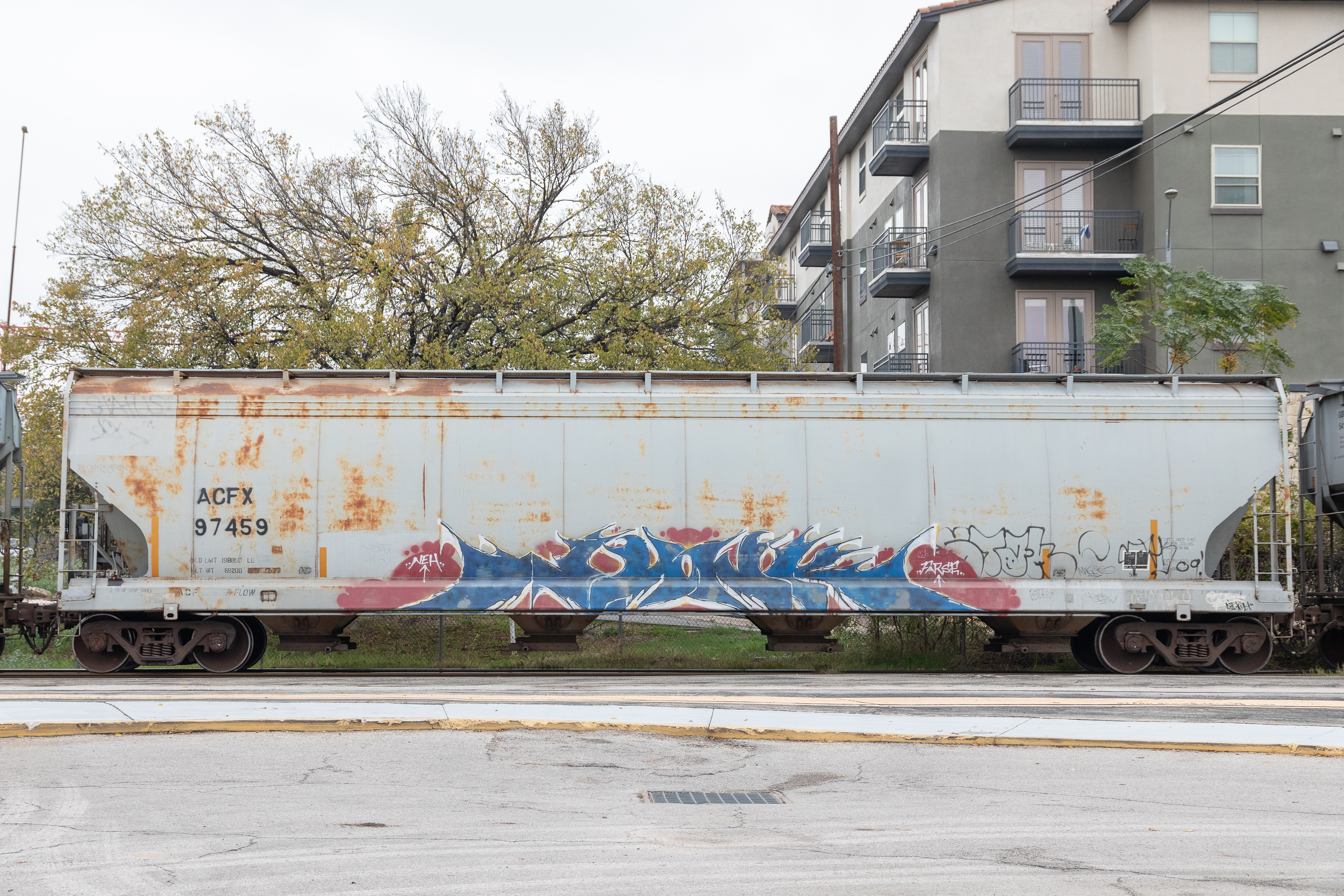
An ACF covered hopper, used for the transport of plastic pellets.

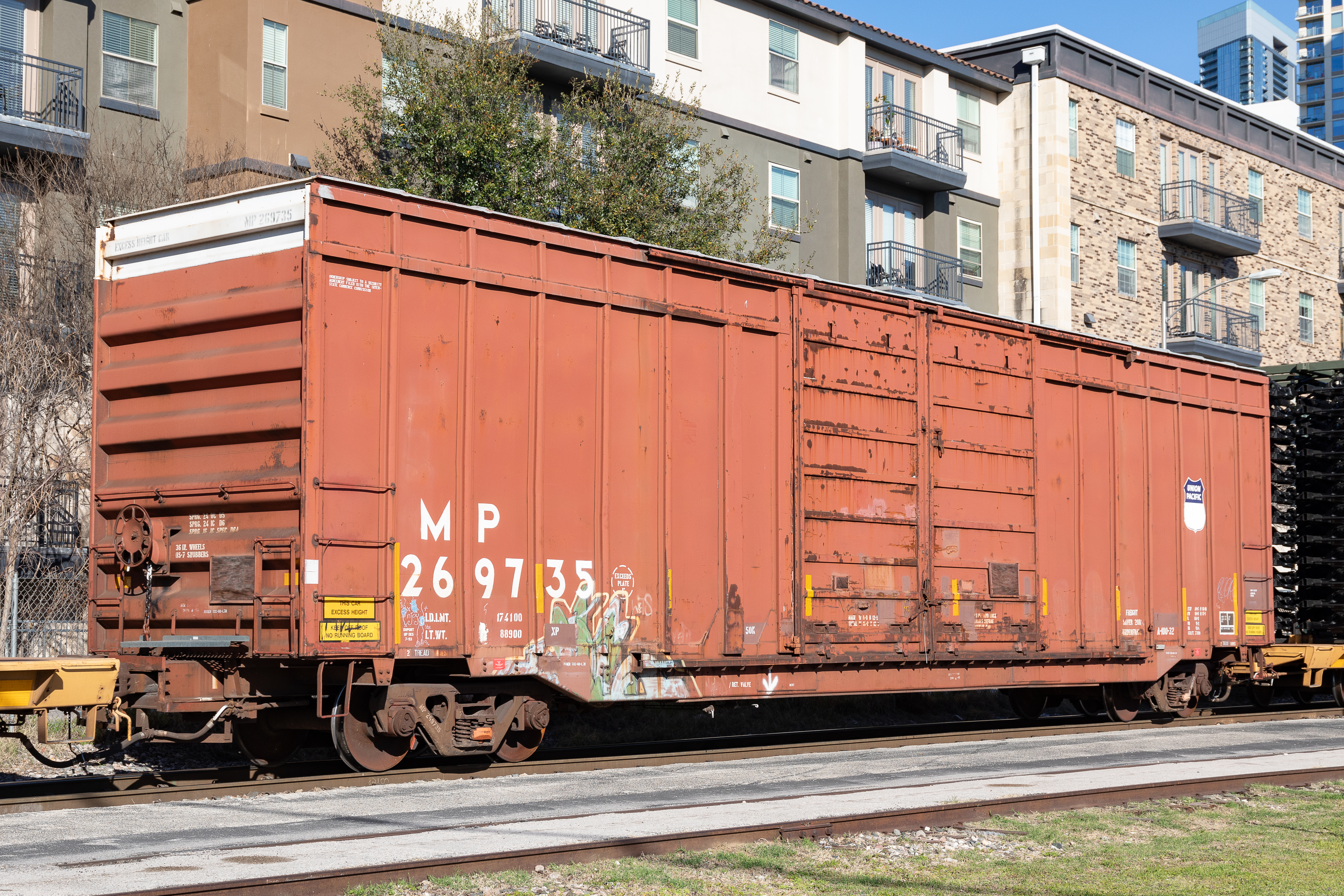
An ACF boxcar, used for the transport of automobile parts

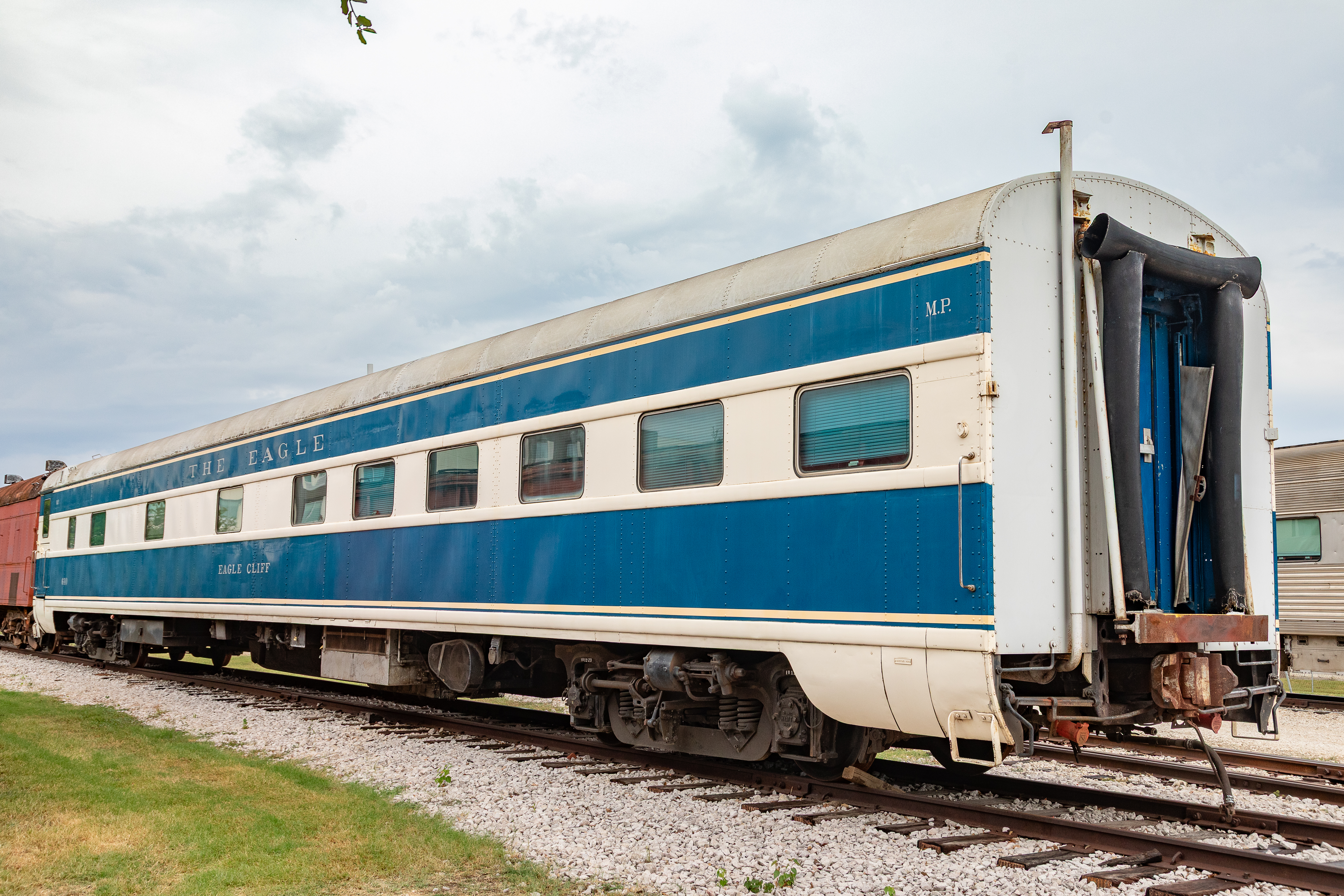
The Eagle Cliff, a sleeper-lounge car built by ACF for the Missouri Pacific, is in service on the Austin Steam Train Association in Cedar Park, Texas.

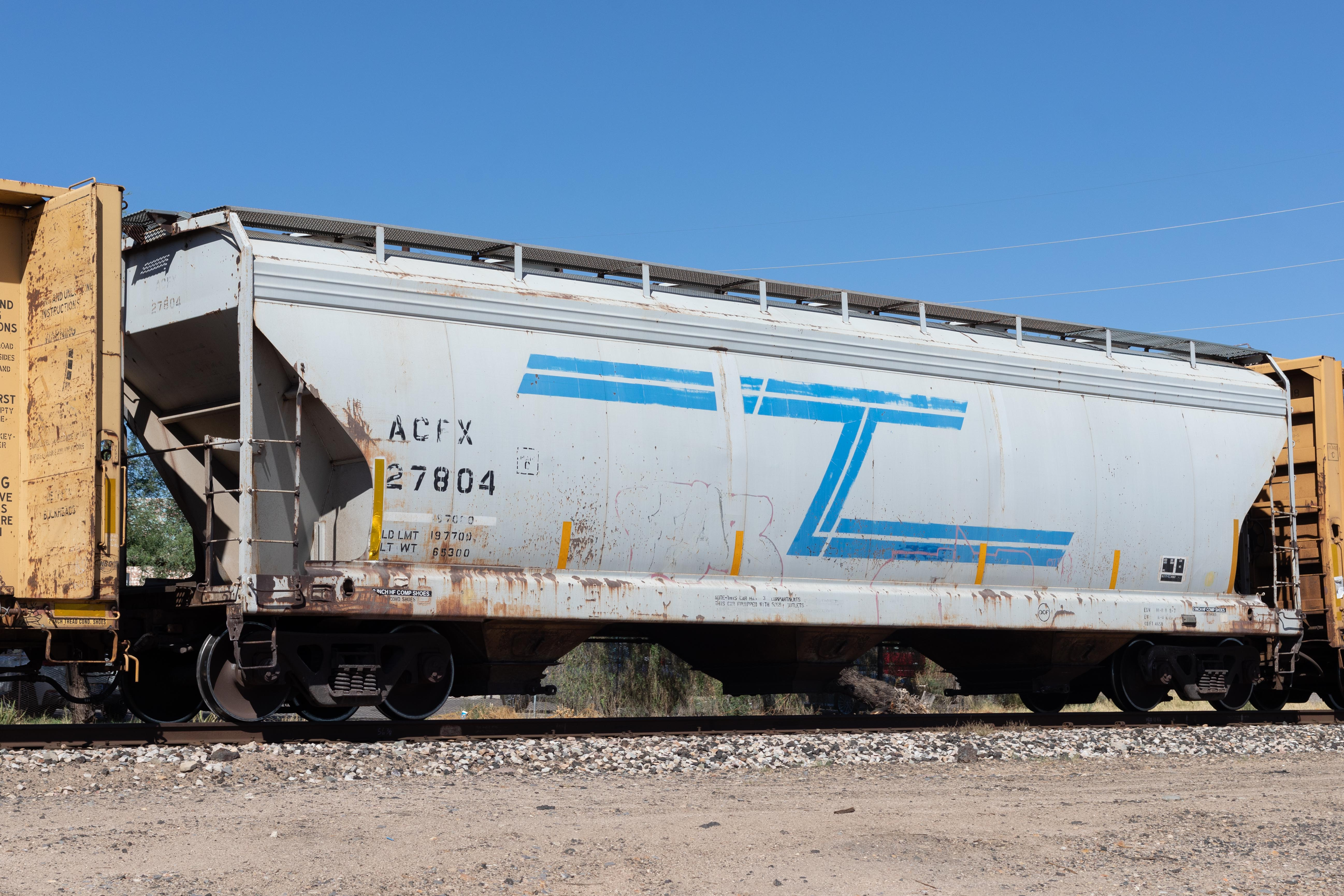
An ACF covered hopper. This paint scheme was the standard scheme of the ACFX covered hopper lease fleet for many years.

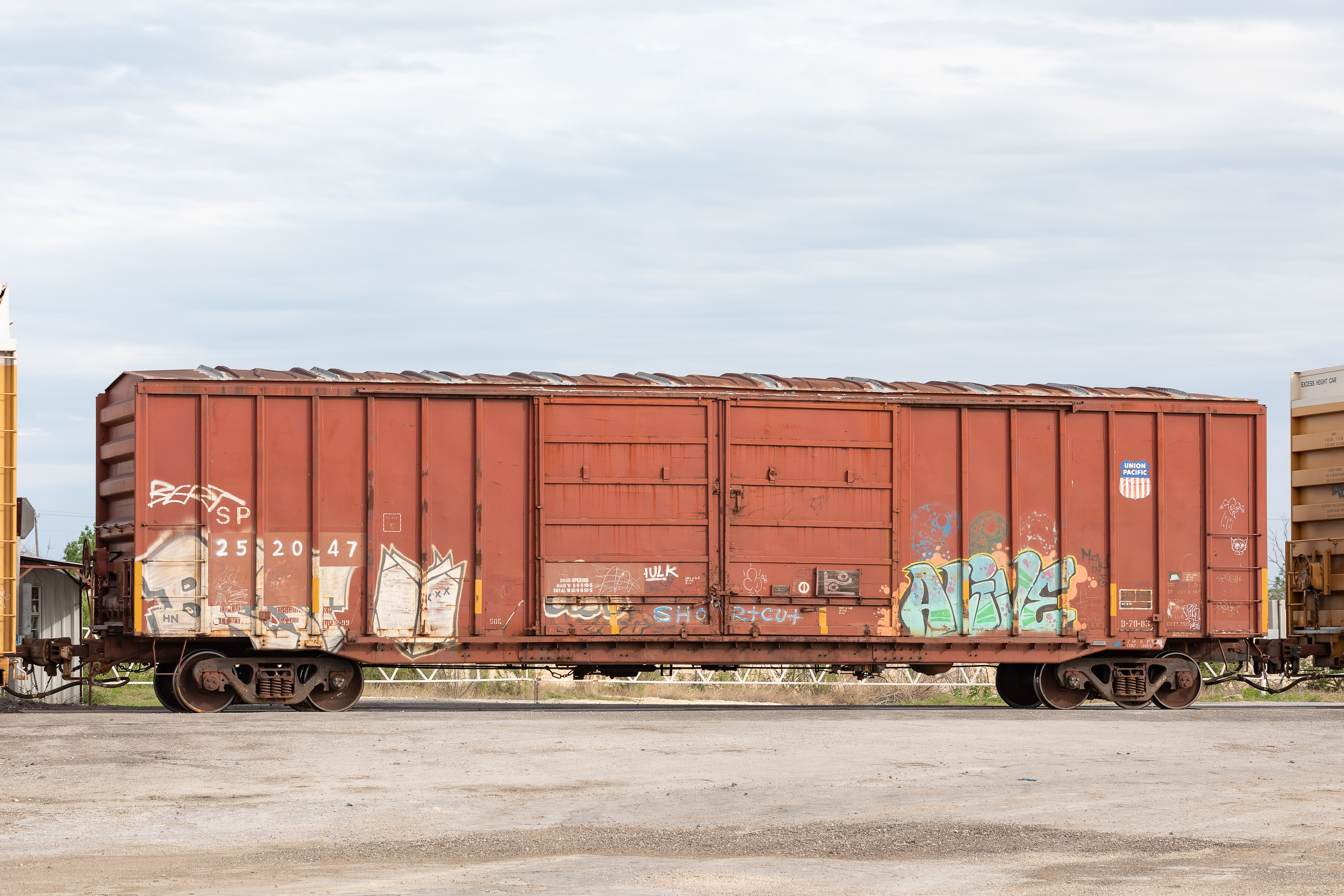
An ACF boxcar

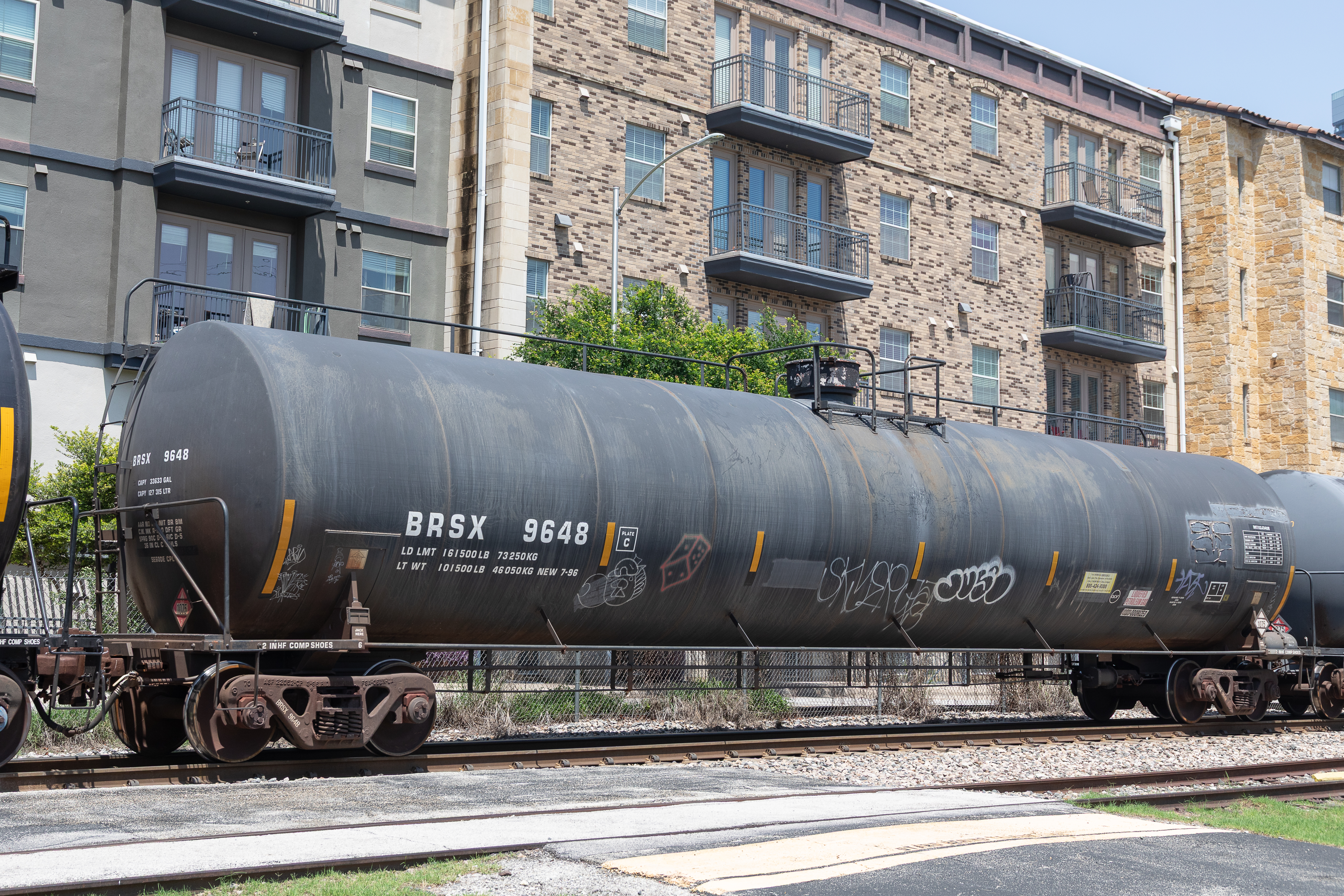
An ACF tank car

== See also ==
- American Car Company
- Canadian Car and Foundry
- List of rolling stock manufacturers
