= The Greenbrier Companies =

American transportation manufacturing company

- Type: Public
- Traded as: NYSE: GBX; S&P 600 component; Russell 2000 component
- Industry: Railways
- Predecessor: Gunderson Bros. (1919); FMC Corporation (1965)
- Founded: 1981
- Headquarters: Lake Oswego, Oregon, U.S.
- Key people: Lorie Tekorius, CEO & President, Board Member
- Products: Railcars, freight rolling stock
- Revenue: US$3.2 billion (August 31, 2025)
- Number of employees: 13,000 (August 31, 2025)
- Website: www.gbrx.com

The Greenbrier Companies is an American publicly traded supplier of equipment and services to global freight transportation markets based in Lake Oswego, Oregon, United States. Greenbrier specializes in transportation services, notably freight railcar manufacturing, railcar refurbishment and railcar leasing/management services. The company designs, manufactures and markets of rail freight equipment in North America, South America and Europe. Greenbrier is also a leading provider of railcars, wheelsets, parts, management, leasing and other services to the railroad and related transportation industries in North America. As of August 31, 2025, Greenbrier employs 13,000 people across its global operations. Formed in 1981 and publicly traded since 1994, the company generates revenues of US$3.2 billion.

The company has manufacturing facilities in Paragould and Marmaduke, Arkansas; Świdnica, Poland; and Hortolândia, Brazil, as well as three railcar manufacturing facilities in Mexico (Monclova, Ciudad Sahagún, and Tlaxcala) and two in Romania , Caracal, and Drobeta-Turnu Severin).

== History ==
=== Gunderson Inc. ===
In 1919, Chester Ellsworth Gunderson, the son of a Swedish immigrant, founded the Wire Wheel Sales & Service Company, acting as a distribution partner for the Houk Company, a Pennsylvania-based wire wheels manufacturer. His brother, Alvin Gunderson, joined the company in 1923. In 1925, the company became the Wheel & Rim Service Inc.

By the 1930s, the company had expanded into other automobile parts servicing. After an unsuccessful foray into the fertilizer distribution business, the company began to manufacture trailers, which required an investment of over $12,000. In 1937, the company began manufacturing dual-axle trailers suitable for on- and off-road use. The new trailer design was a commercial success and, in 1938, the incorporated company Gunderson Bros. was formed with its factory in Linnton, Portland, Oregon. In 1941, the company began building barges. The company distributed, installed and pioneered the use of General Motors diesel engines.

In 1938, the company was near bankruptcy, in part due to the effects of the Great Depression and in part due to the Gundersons' own financial mismanagement. The company's main creditor took control of their accounts and began to pay their suppliers. Yet the company's financial position remained tenuous.

At the beginning of the Second World War, the company handled assembly work for the United States Navy; in 1941, a loan from the Navy enabled Gunderson Bros. to build a shipyard. During the same period, the company's continued debts caused the Federal Government to take the original factory as security. The company also constructed lifeboats, landing crafts and other vessels, as well as trailers for the United States Army. A shortage of manpower also led to the first women working in the construction sheds.

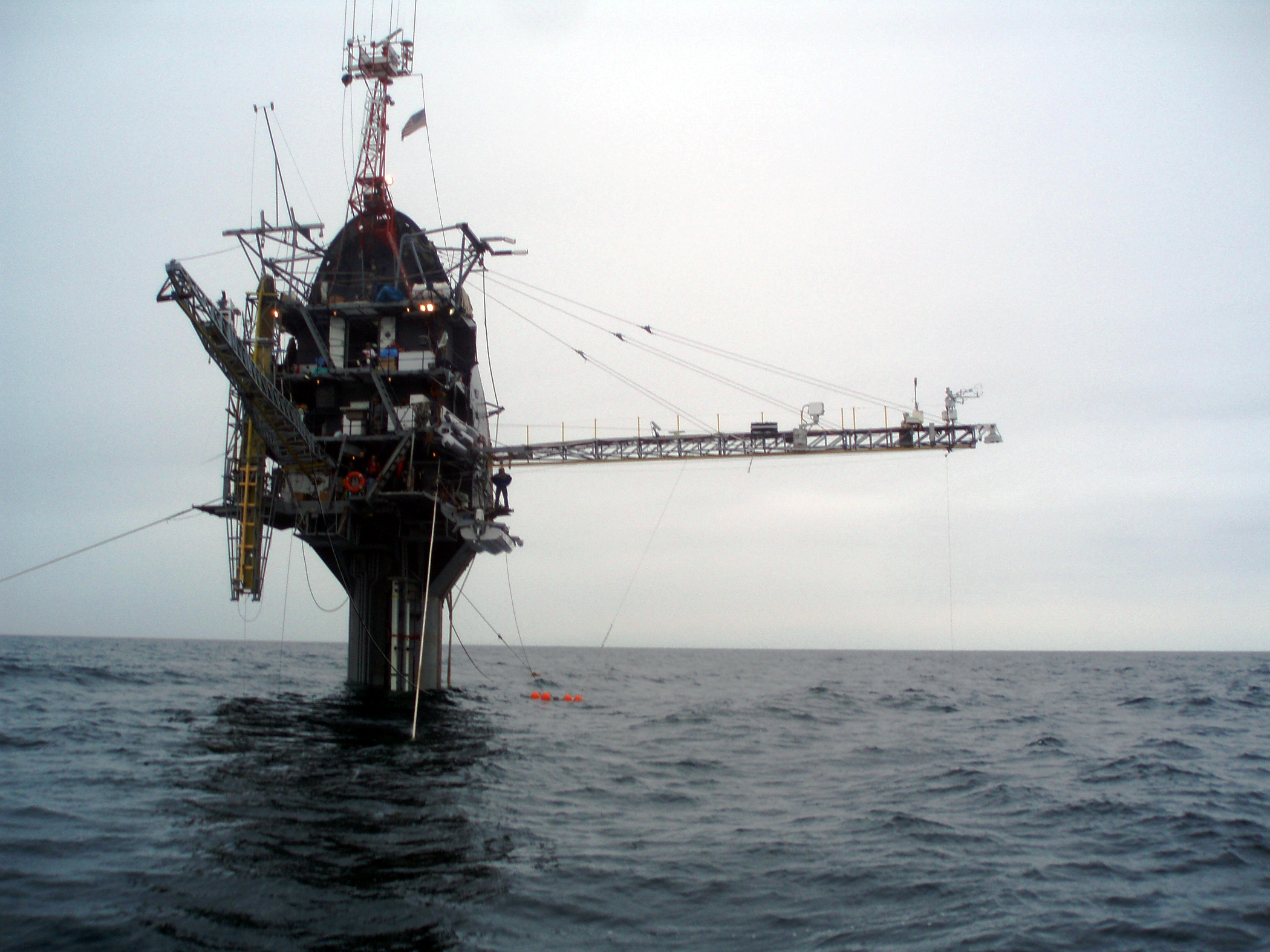
An unusual contract - the RP FLIP research vessel

In 1942, the company became Gunderson Bros. Engineering Corporation. After World War II, the Linnton facility was closed and the company owned comprehensive facilities for large-scale metal engineering as well as a slipway for launching ships at the Front Avenue manufacturing facility. Construction of marine vessels such as tugs, peacetime barges, trawlers and more specialized craft continued in the 1950s and 1960s. By the 1970s, the company was building vessels as long as 650 ft (200 m) and as wide as 100 ft (30 m). Other postwar business lines included metal water towers, large-scale metal storage tanks, bridges and structural steel for buildings, as well as specialized equipment such as metal slipways for the McNary Dam (1950s), a dry dock for the Port of Portland (1963) and the vessel RP FLIP (1962).

In 1958, the company entered the freight railcar business with a successful bid to construct 200 boxcar underframes for the Southern Pacific Railroad. The business was successful and profitable, and the order expanded, with Gunderson eventually building more than 2,000 frames in the first contract.

In 1965, the Gundersons sold their company to the FMC Corporation and, in 1973, it became the Marine and Rail Equipment Division of FMC (MRED). In 1979, it produced more than 6,000 railcars. The following year, however, the early 1980s recession began. Many orders were cancelled and new orders plummeted; in 1982, only 25 railcars were built. Simultaneously, new developments in rail freight transport led to new products, such as multi-platform articulated spine car sets (used for TOFC transportation of highway semi-trailers) built for the Itel Corporation. Also in the 1980s, the company developed "Twin-Stack" wells for double-stack rail transport of intermodal containers in a joint venture with Greenbrier. The Twin-Stack became an important product, with approximately 3,000 being produced in 1990. By 2018, Greenbrier produced over 100,000 intermodal wells.

In 1985, MRED was acquired by The Greenbrier Companies. The Gunderson plant, now owned by Oregon Green Manufacturing, LLC (OGM) remains a successful facility and continues to produce oceangoing barges.

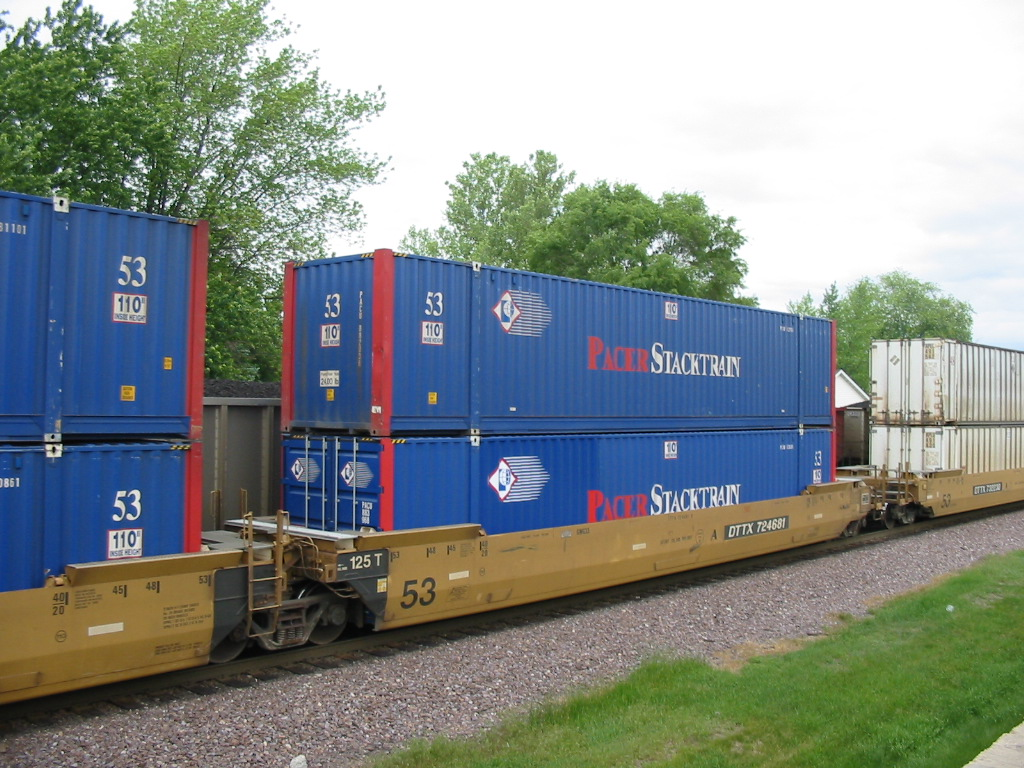
A Greenbrier articulated well car with intermodal containers

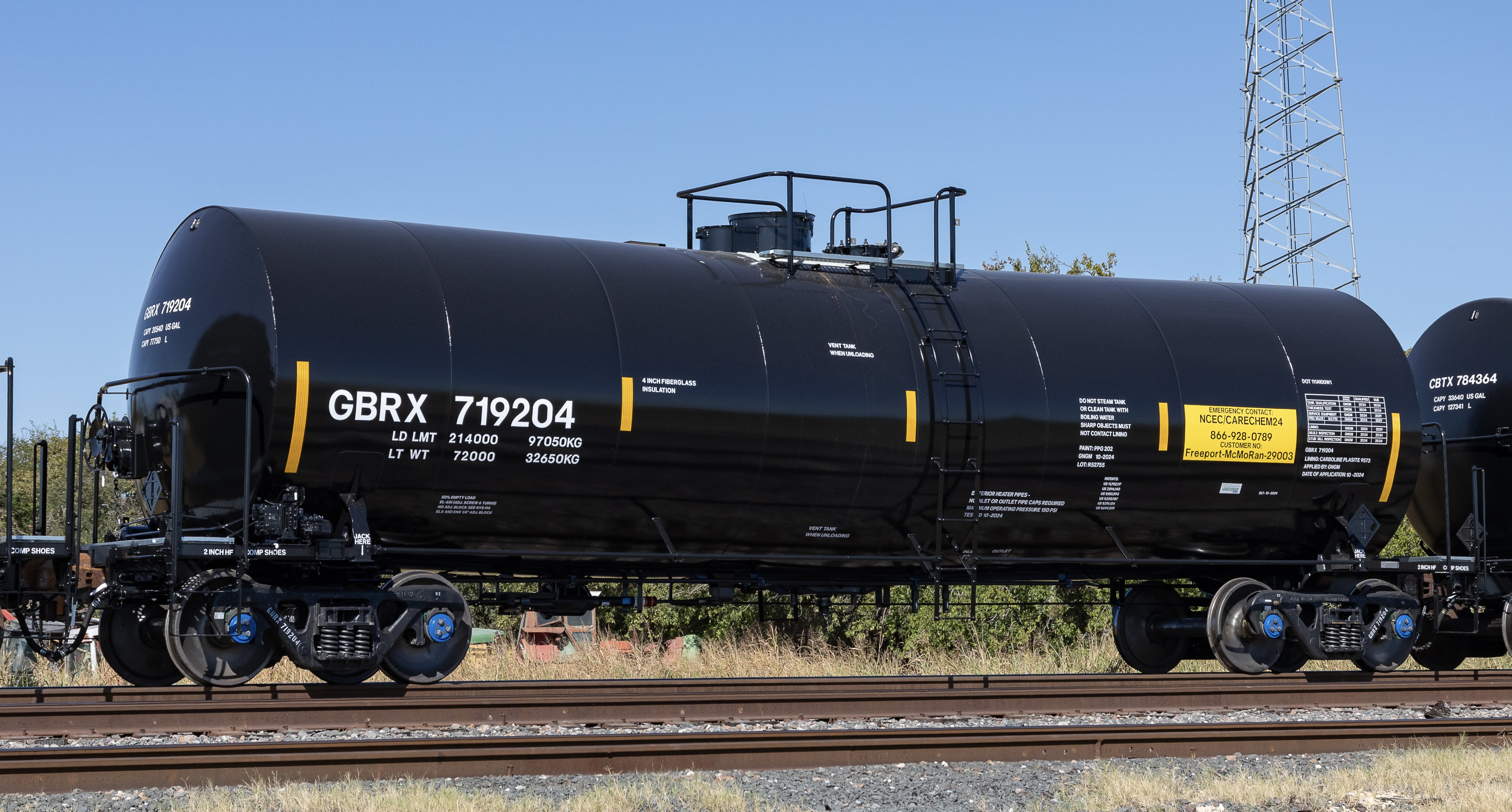
A Greenbrier tank car

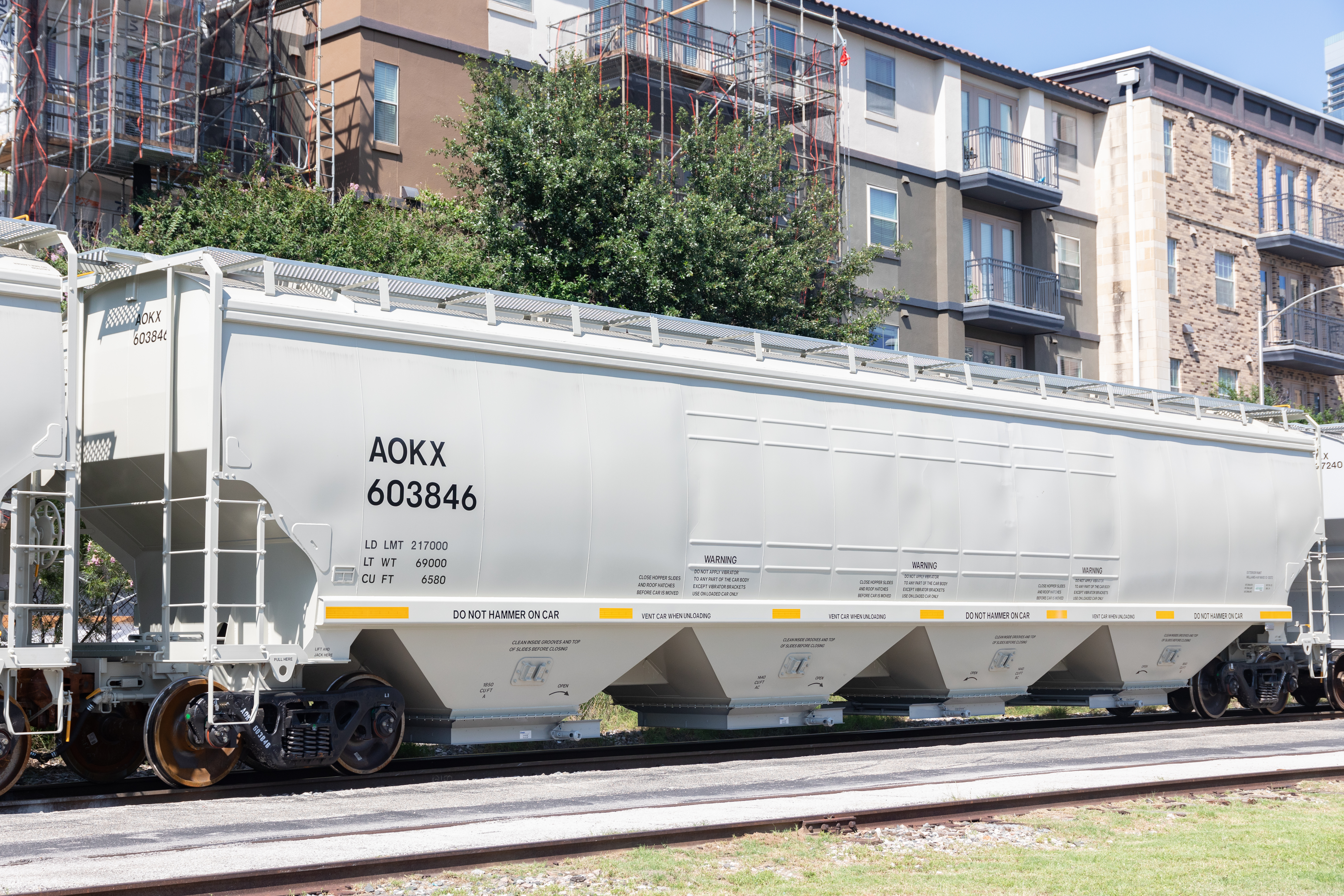
A Greenbrier covered hopper

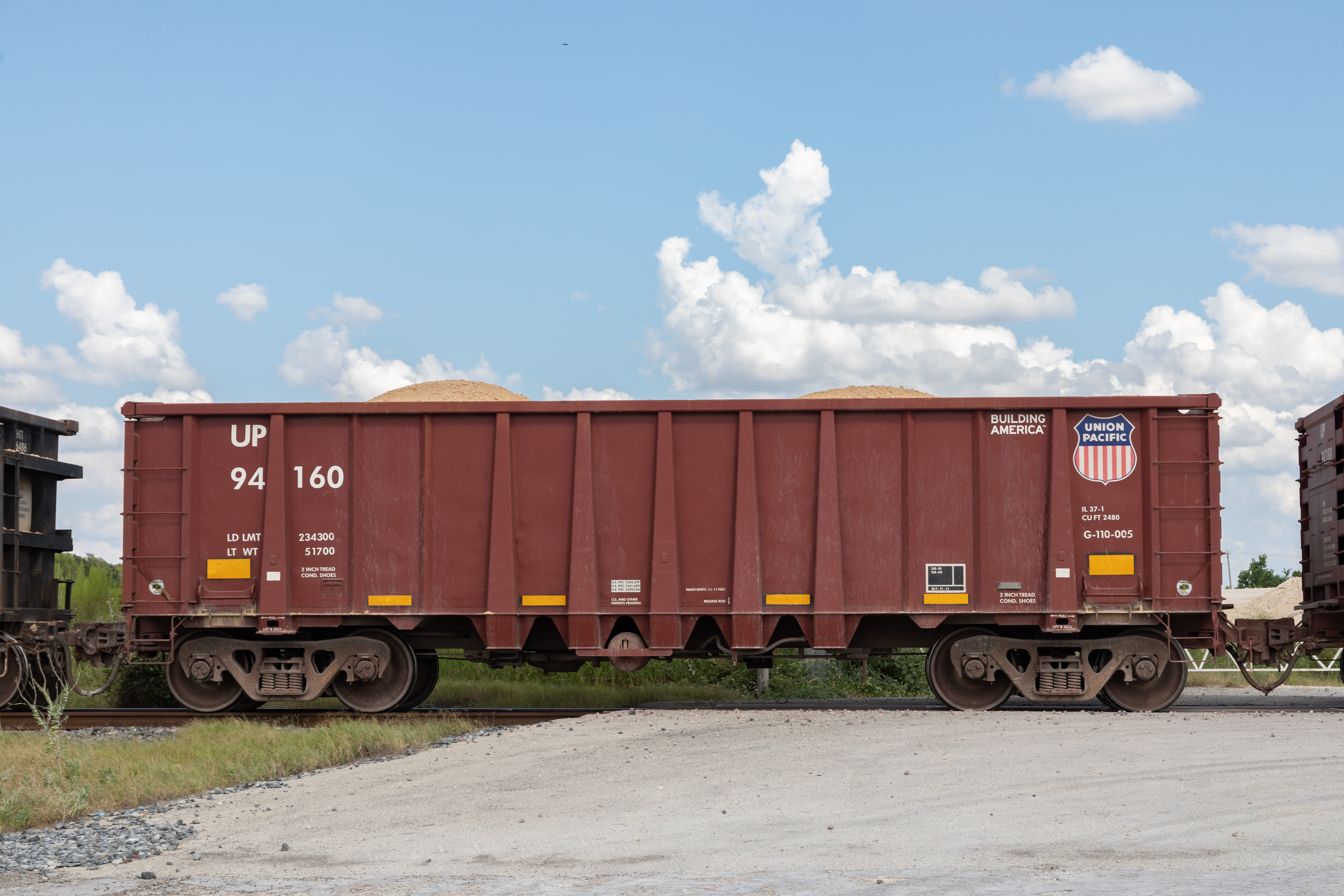
A Greenbrier aggregate gondola

=== The Greenbrier Companies ===
In 1970, the Commercial Metals Company and M.D. Friedman companies jointly formed a flatcar leasing company called Greenbrier Leasing Corporation. In 1981, Commercial Metals sold the company to Alan James and William A. Furman, the owners of James-Furman & Company and founders of The Greenbrier Companies. In 1985, Greenbrier entered the Oregon manufacturing market through the acquisition of MRED and renamed it Gunderson, Inc.

By the early 1990s, the company's sales and profits increased dramatically due to an increase in North American rail freight development and transportation needs. The company went public in 1994 and, in 1995, acquired TrentonWorks, another rail freight rolling stock manufacturing facility in Nova Scotia, Canada. The TrentonWorks facility closed in 2007 as a result of unfavorable exchange rates and lower operating costs in Mexico.

In 1991, Greenbrier established its rail services division, adding to its maintenance and refurbishment capabilities.

In 1998, the company acquired Polish railcar manufacturer Wagony Świdnica. The same year, Greenbrier formed a joint venture with Bombardier Inc. in a former Concarril facility located in Sahagún, Mexico. In 2004, Bombardier's stake in the venture was acquired; the operation now goes by Greenbrier Sahagún.

Between 2006 and 2008, the company bought several rolling stock equipment companies. In 2006, Greenbrier formed the joint venture GIMSA in Mexico with Grupo Industrial Monclova.

In December 2012, Carl Icahn made an offer to purchase Greenbrier for $20 a share, which represented a 5.4% premium to Greenbrier's stock price at that time. His offer was rejected.

In response to growing safety concerns surrounding increasing levels of hazardous tank car shipments, in 2014 Greenbrier introduced the “Tank Car of the Future,” a new generation of tank cars featuring safety enhancements that were adopted by PHMSA as part of a new industry standard, the DOT-117 tank car. The company led the award-winning Safer Tank Cars Now campaign, which is still archived in the Library of Congress.

In 2014, Greenbrier announced a railcar maintenance joint venture company with Watco called GBW Railcar Services. In, 2018, Greenbrier and Watco announced the discontinuation of the joint venture to allow both companies to better capitalize on railcar maintenance demands in the North American market. Under the agreement, the railcar maintenance shops and employees at each location were returned to management by their previous operators.

In 2015, Greenbrier opened Greenbrier Tlaxcala, a wholly owned railcar manufacturing facility in Tlaxcala, Mexico. The company also acquired a 19.5% stake in Amsted-Maxion Hortolândia, a Brazilian railcar manufacturer, for US$15 million; Greenbrier took a majority interest of Greenbrier Maxion in 2017. Additionally in 2015, the Saudi Railway Company (SAR) awarded Greenbrier a contract with the Public Investment Fund (PIF) to manufacture nearly 1,200 tank wagons.

In 2016, The Greenbrier Companies and AstraRail Management (AstraRail Industries, Romania) announced the merging of their European activities into a joint venture, Greenbrier AstraRail. As part of the agreement, Greenbrier agreed to pay AstraRail $60 million. The joint venture eventually became 75% owned by Greenbrier.

In 2018, Greenbrier completed an agreement between Turkish railcar manufacturer and maintenance and parts services provider Rayvag Vagon Sanayi ve Ticaret A.S and Greenbrier's European subsidiary, Greenbrier AstraRail, to take a 68% ownership stake in Rayvag. The Rayvag operations were sold in 2023.

In 2019, Greenbrier launched its first Sustainability Report and continues to publish annually.

Also in 2019, Greenbrier acquired American Railcar Industries (ARI), a transaction valued at $400 million. The acquisition added two railcar manufacturing and two railcar component and part producers to Greenbrier's operations, increasing the company's U.S.-based workforce and insulating it from uncertainties related to North American free trade.

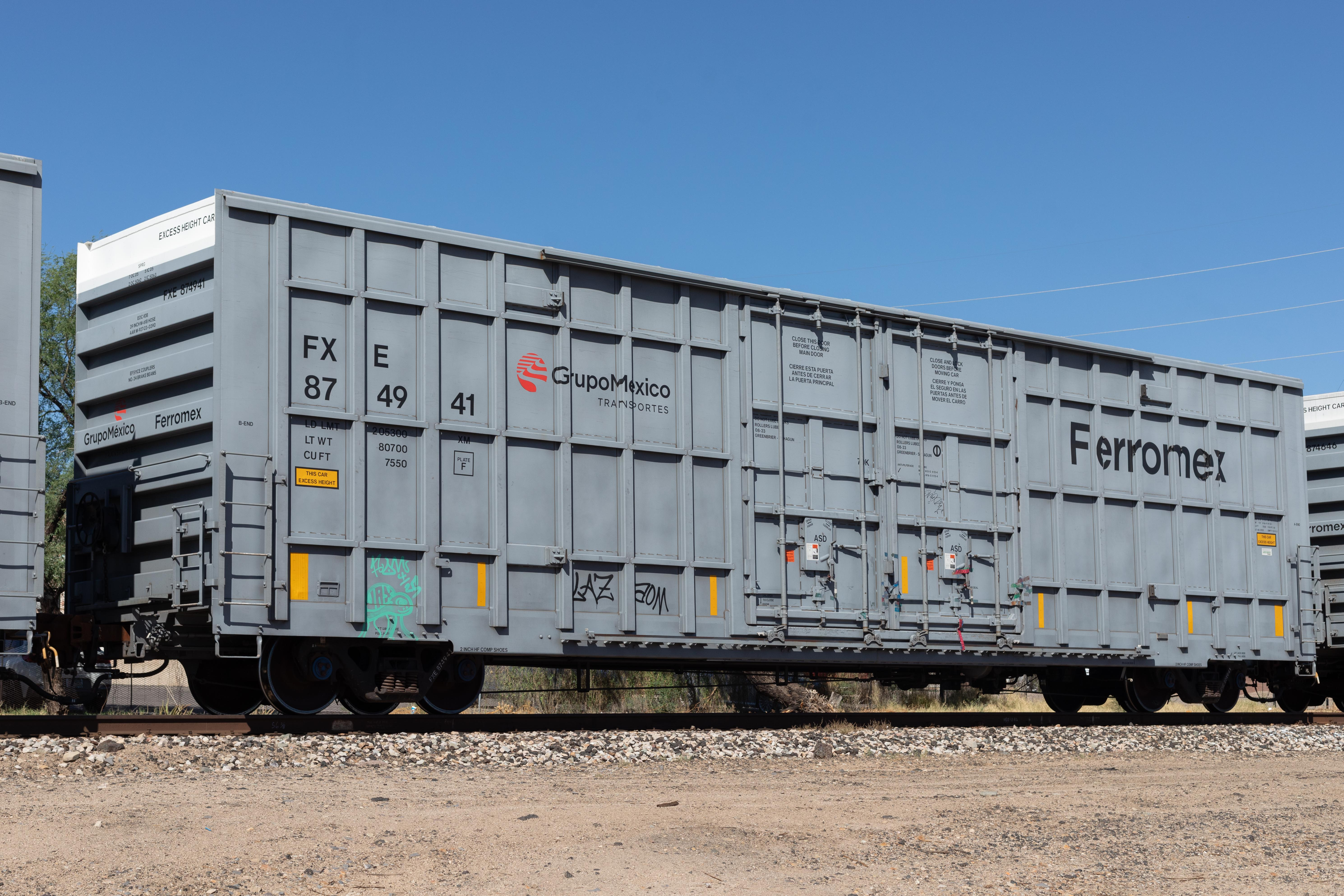
A Greenbrier boxcar

In 2021, Greenbrier formed GBX Leasing, a joint venture with The Longwood Group, a Chicago-based transportation equipment advisory and asset management firm, to develop an owned portfolio of leased railcars to be built primarily by Greenbrier. GBX Leasing became wholly owned by Greenbrier after the company acquired Longwood Group's minority interest in 2023.

In 2021, Greenbrier was recognized as an "Oregon History Maker" by the Oregon Historical Society.

In 2022, Greenbrier's founder and CEO Bill Furman stepped down as CEO and retired the office of Executive Chairman. The Board of Directors appointed then-President & Chief Operating Officer Lorie Tekorius to CEO & President. Furman remained a director through the expiration of his term in January 2024.

In 2023, Greenbrier sold the Gunderson Marine facility to Oregon Green Manufacturing, marking its exit from marine manufacturing. Later that year, Greenbrier sold its ownership stake in Rayvag to its joint venture partner and founded Greenbrier Vagon in Turkey. Greenbrier ceased Vagon operations in 2025

== Products and services ==
=== Rail vehicles ===
==== North America ====
Greenbrier operates five new railcar manufacturing facilities in North America: Greenbrier Paragould (Paragould, Arkansas), Greenbrier Marmaduke (Marmaduke, Arkansas), Greenbrier Sahagún (Sahagún, Mexico), Greenbrier Tlaxcala (Tlaxcala, Mexico) and Greenbrier GIMSA (Monclova, Mexico). Equipment manufactured includes intermodal and conventional railcars, including boxcars, center partitions, covered hoppers, double stacks, flatcars, gondolas, tank cars, auto racks, and two proprietary automobile carriers: the AutoMax and Multi-Max.

==== Eastern Europe ====
Greenbrier Europe produces conventional freight railcars at Greenbrier Wagony Świdnica (Świdnica, Poland) and Greenbrier AstraRail, Drobeta-Turnu Severin and Caracal, Romania).

=== Maintenance Services ===
Maintenance Services (previously known as GRS) sells reconditioned wheelsets and provides wheel services throughout the United States. Maintenance Services. It also reconditions, manufactures and sells railcar parts and operates an independent railcar maintenance and repair shop network across the U.S.

=== Leasing and management ===
Together, Greenbrier Leasing Company LLC (GLC) and GBX Leasing (GBXL) own railcar lease fleets in North America. Greenbrier also runs a railcar syndications platform as a function of its leasing business. Greenbrier Management Services (GMS) facilitates operations on almost every Class I railroad. GMS offers services such as railcar maintenance management, car hire processing, regulatory compliance and railcar re-marketing.

== See also ==
- List of companies based in Oregon
