= Saskatchewan Grain Car Corporation =

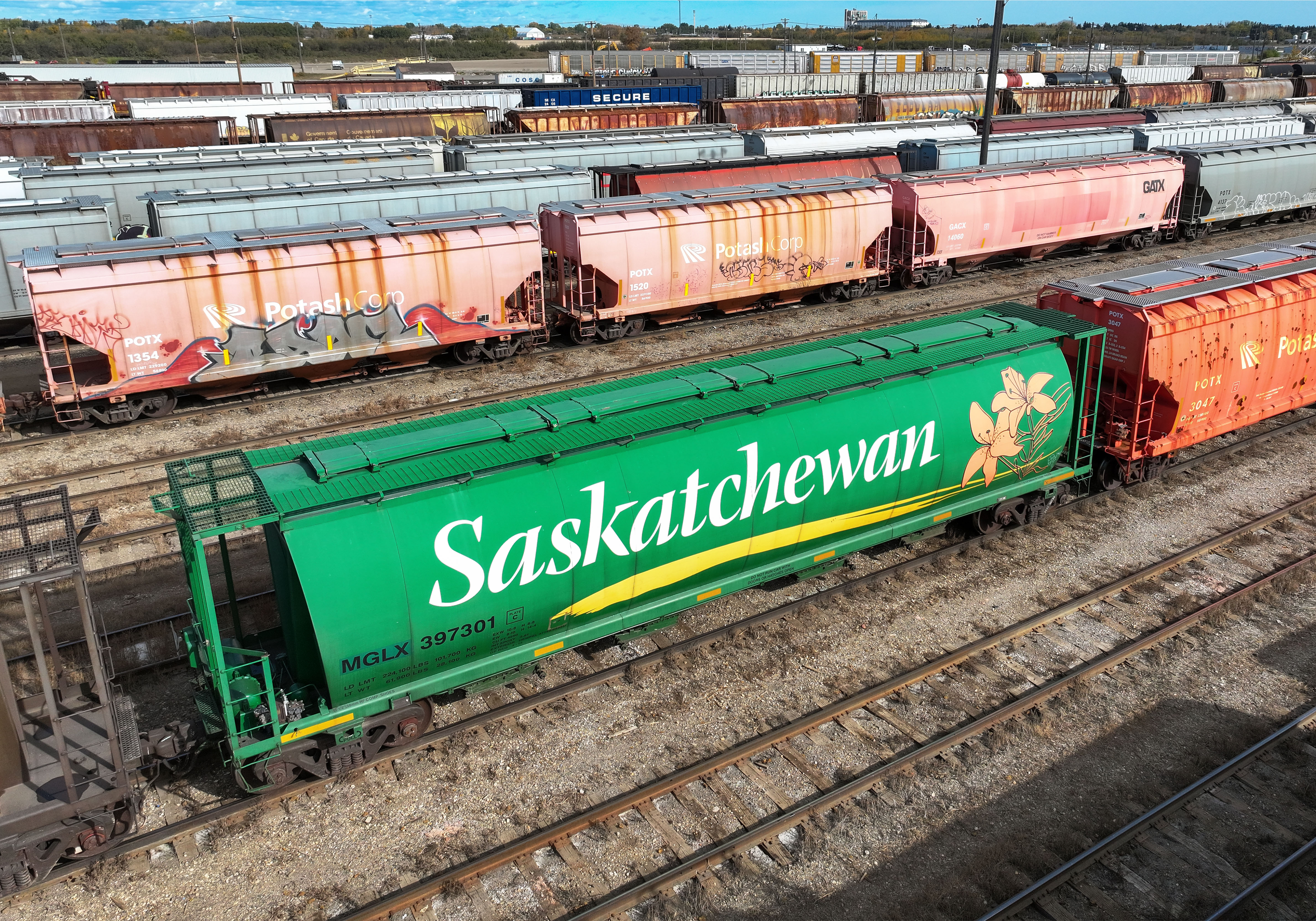
- Hopper car in the 2007 Saskatchewan livery
- Formation: 1979
- Dissolved: 2017
- Type: Crown corporation
- Purpose: Railway car leasing
- Headquarters: Regina, Saskatchewan, Canada
- Region served: Saskatchewan
- Products: Covered hopper car leasing
- Parent organization: Government of Saskatchewan

Saskatchewan Grain Car Corporation (reporting marks SKPX, SKNX) was a Canadian crown corporation owned by the Government of Saskatchewan.

== History ==
By the 1960s, it had become apparent that various economic factors, including competition and inflation, had led to Canadian railway companies losing increasingly larger sums of money handling grain. Furthermore, capital investments into branch line infrastructure and rolling stock was being increasingly neglected as to minimise costs, but this approach led to a long-term decline in the ability of the railways to support the demands of the agricultural sector. Thus, even though large scale sales had been lined up with export customers such as China and Russia, by the late 1960s, it was clear that the railways were struggling to fulfil them satisfactorily. Seeking to address these issues, both the Canadian federal government and regional governments opted to intervene. Throughout the 1970s, various entities opted to purchase new rolling stock for grain trains; over a 20 year period, nearly 13,500 hopper cars would be procured via this approach.

The Government of Saskatchewan was one of the organisations that chose to actively participate in the matter. On 2 October 1979, the Saskatchewan Grain Car Corporation was established with the stated purpose of purchasing and renting grain rail cars for the transportation of statutory grains between Saskatchewan and export ports. Its existence and activities were governed by the Saskatchewan Grain Car Corporation Act. During 1990, the government invested $55 million into the corporation for the purchase of 1,000 new covered rail cars.

During 2011, the corporation shifted its priority for the leasing of its rolling stock towards the province’s short line railways. This direction gradually led to the almost 500 cars previously being leased to Canadian National being returned and subsequently leased to smaller operators such as the Last Mountain Railway.

The corporation was able to generate a positive financial return during most of its operating years, returning a cumulative $20.5 million in dividends to the government. However, during 2016, a deficit of $221,000 was recorded by the corporation. During March 2017, the Government of Saskatchewan announced that the Saskatchewan Grain Car Corporation was going to be wound down and its assets sold off, noting that for long term operations to have continued, a $100 million investment to purchase new rail cars would have been necessary within a decade.

== Rolling stock ==
Railcars of the Corporation on a CN train. Older brown and newer green paint scheme.

Upon the corporation's establishment, rolling stock was quickly obtained from the Canadian Pacific Railway and Canadian National Railway; these second hand cars were only used briefly before being replaced by new-build counterparts.

Between February and October 1981, 1,000 steel rail cars, lined with epoxy, were manufactured by Hawker Siddeley Canada for the corporation. Each of these cars had a capacity of 128.8 cubic metres (4548.5 cubic feet). By 2010, approximately 906 cars remained operation, 417 of which were allocated to Canadian National while 489 were being operated by Canadian Pacific. Approximately 800 cars were in their original brown and orange paint scheme. During 2007, 110 cars were repaired by GE Rail Car Repair Services Company in Regina; a new paint scheme adopted around this time was applied to some of these units, being green with the type Saskatchewan!. Models of the rail cars are sold by North American Railcar Corporation.

During early 2017, as part of the corporation's winding down, the nearly 1,000 hopper cars in its inventory were put up for sale; priority was given to the 13 shortline operators based in Saskatchewan. Multiple operators submitted offers to buy numerous cars, of which three were accepted; these were Big Sky Rail, who bid for 663 cars, Great Western Railway, for 150 cars, and Great Sandhills Railway for 85 cars.
