= Ball Watch Company =

Swiss watch company

BALL Watch Company
- Type: Private
- Industry: Watchmaking
- Founded: 1891, Ohio, USA
- Founder: Webb C. Ball
- Headquarters: La Chaux-de-Fonds, Switzerland
- Products: Swiss Made Mechanical Watches
- Website: ballwatch.com

BALL Watch Company SA is a Swiss luxury watch company based in La Chaux-de-Fonds, Switzerland. It was founded in 1891 by Webb C. Ball in Cleveland, Ohio, and is linked to American railroad history.

== History ==
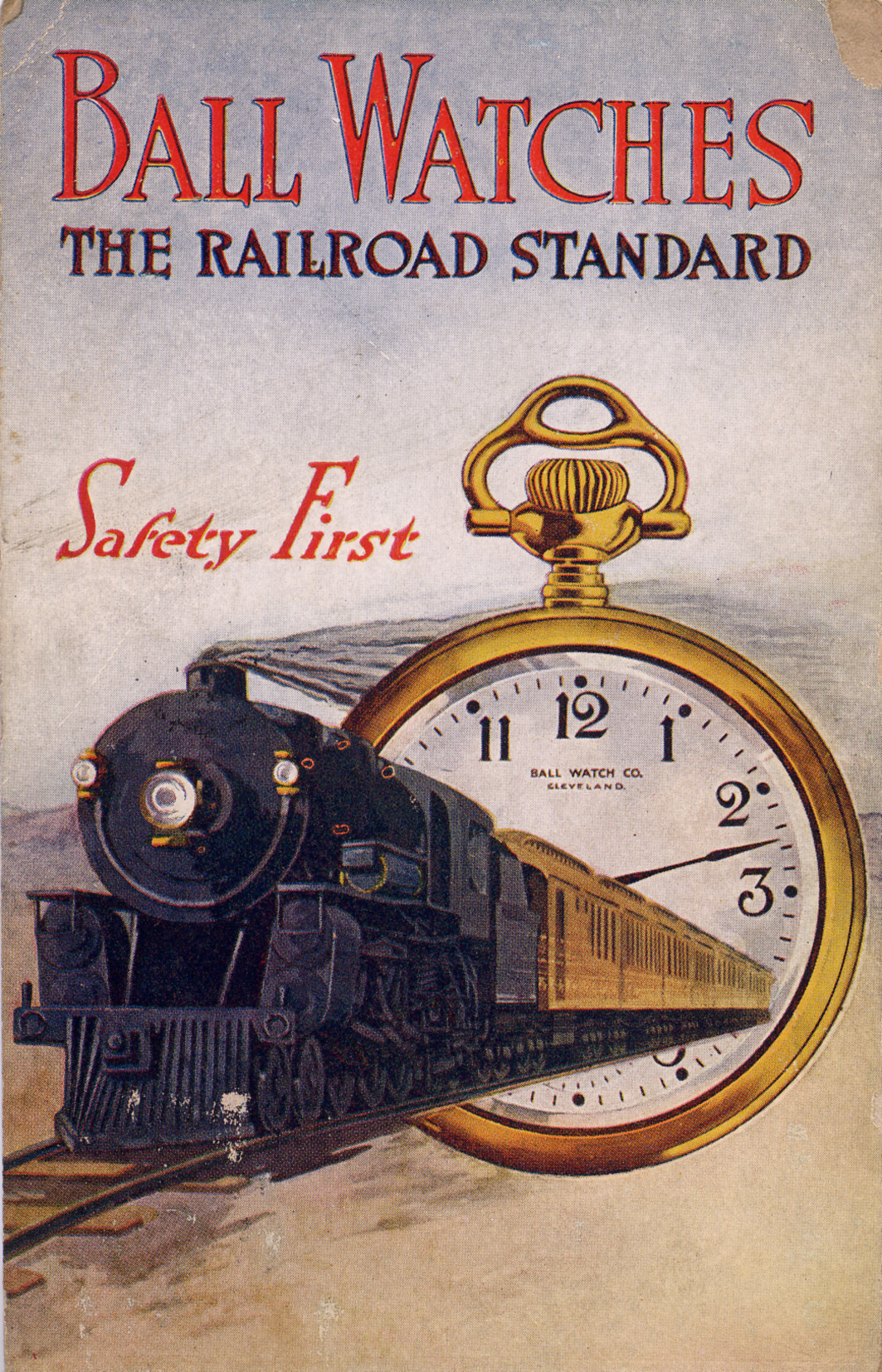
BALL advertisement

Before the development of railroads across the United States, there was no need for a standardization of time or any real accuracy in timekeeping. Each town kept its own local time, based on the position of the sun. When trains began to connect distant cities, it became problematic and difficult to avoid collisions. Moreover, there were no policies or standards for the watches used by the railroad employees.

On April 19, 1891, a head-on collision between two trains in Kipton, Ohio resulted in several deaths. At the time, trains were using the same lines in opposite directions and had to cross each other at defined crossing points. That day, one of the conductors’ watches stopped for four minutes, leading to the fatal collision.

In order to make train rides safer for travelers and employees of the railroads, Webb C. Ball was designated "Chief Time Inspector" and set up tests and standards for all watches used on the trains. Ball’s criteria for accuracy and reliability were so strict that they later inspired others like the Swiss Official Testing Institute (COSC).

In 2015 Ball Watch produced 5,031 COSC certified chronometers.

== RR Standard ==
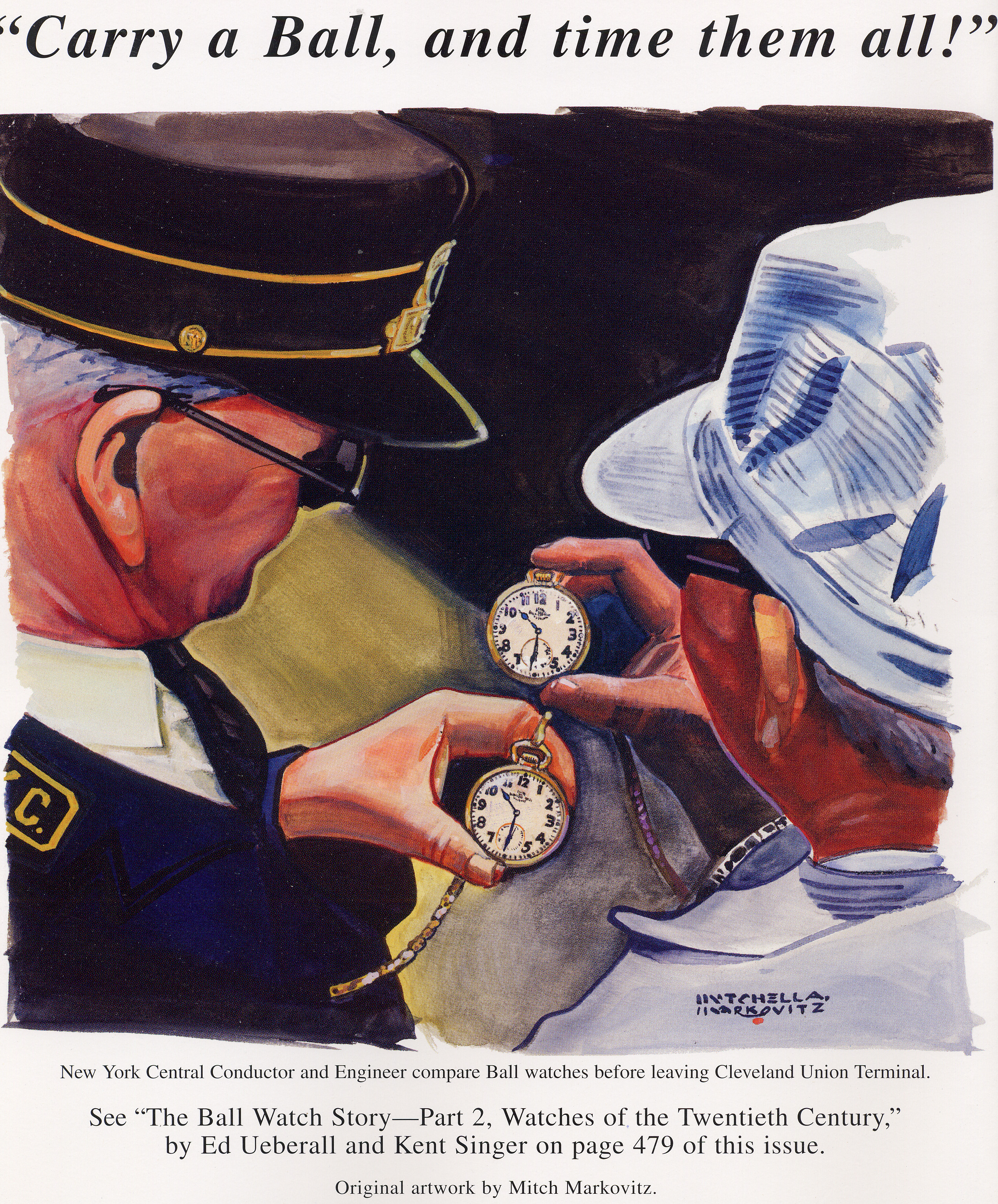
BALL's old ad

Webb C. Ball set up "RR Standard" ("RR" for Rail Road) to assure a high accuracy and perfect reading to all railroad employees. He also created the BALL Time Service, an after-sale service to which every employee of the rails had to bring his watch every two weeks to make sure the accuracy and reliability of the watch was maximal.

To obtain the "RR Standard" certification, the watches had to follow certain criteria:

- No lid on the dial, size 18 or 16 (44.86mm or 43.17mm)
- Plain white dial, bold black hands and Arabic numbers
- Winding stem at 12 o’clock
- Minimum of 17 jewels
- Must have a double roller
- Must be lever-set
- Adjusted to at least 5 positions
- Be adjusted to temperatures of 40 to 95 degrees Fahrenheit
- Accuracy with a gain or loss of maximum 30 seconds a week

== Collections ==
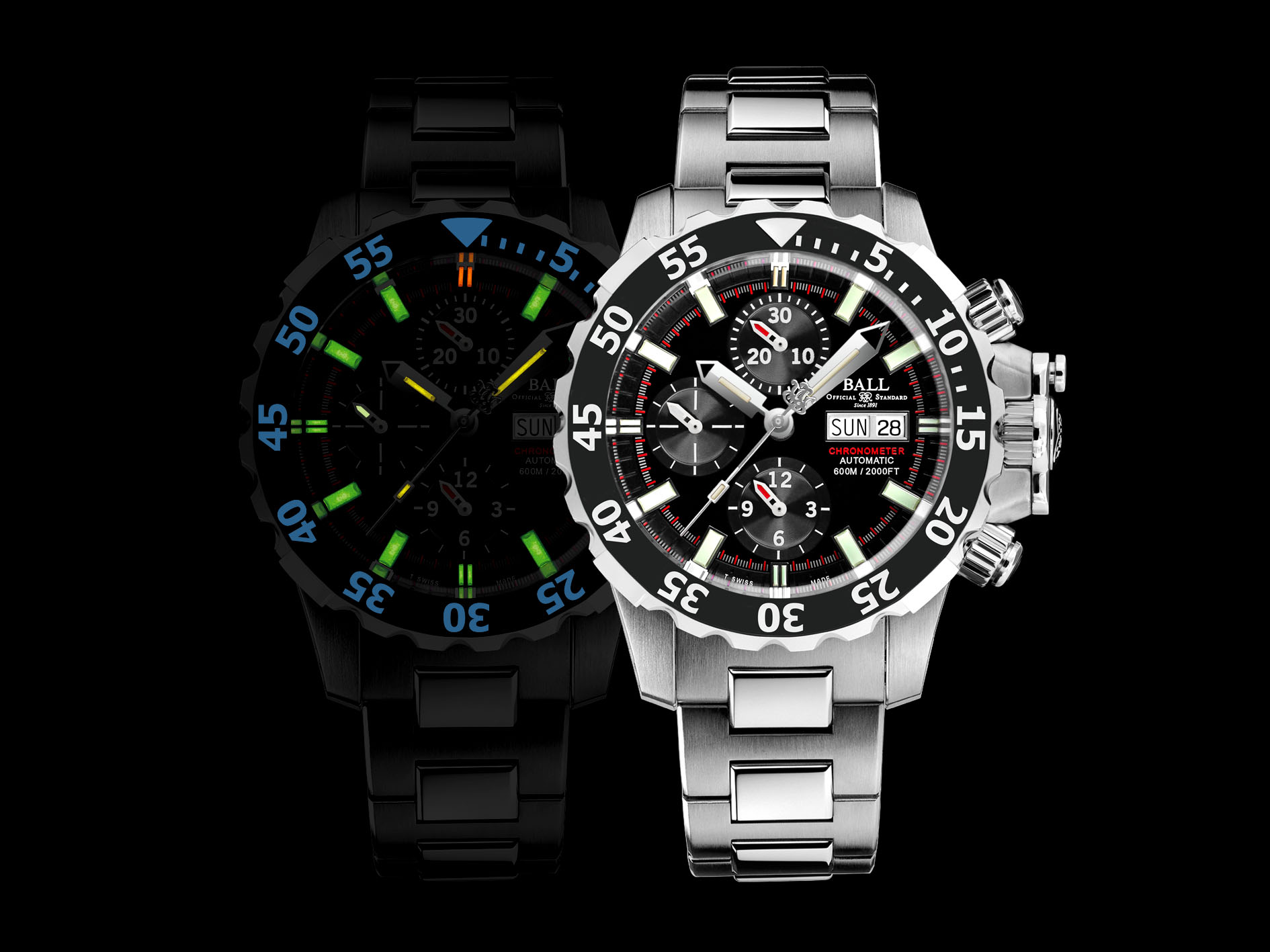
Engineer Hydrocarbon NEDU

BALL Watch currently has nine distinct collections, consisting of various models:

- Official Railroad Watch models
- Engineer II models
- Engineer III models
- Engineer M models
- Engineer Master II models
- Engineer Hydrocarbon models
- Trainmaster models
- Fireman models
- Roadmaster models
