= Union Church (Kipton, Ohio) =

Historic church in Ohio, United States

- U.S. National Register of Historic Places
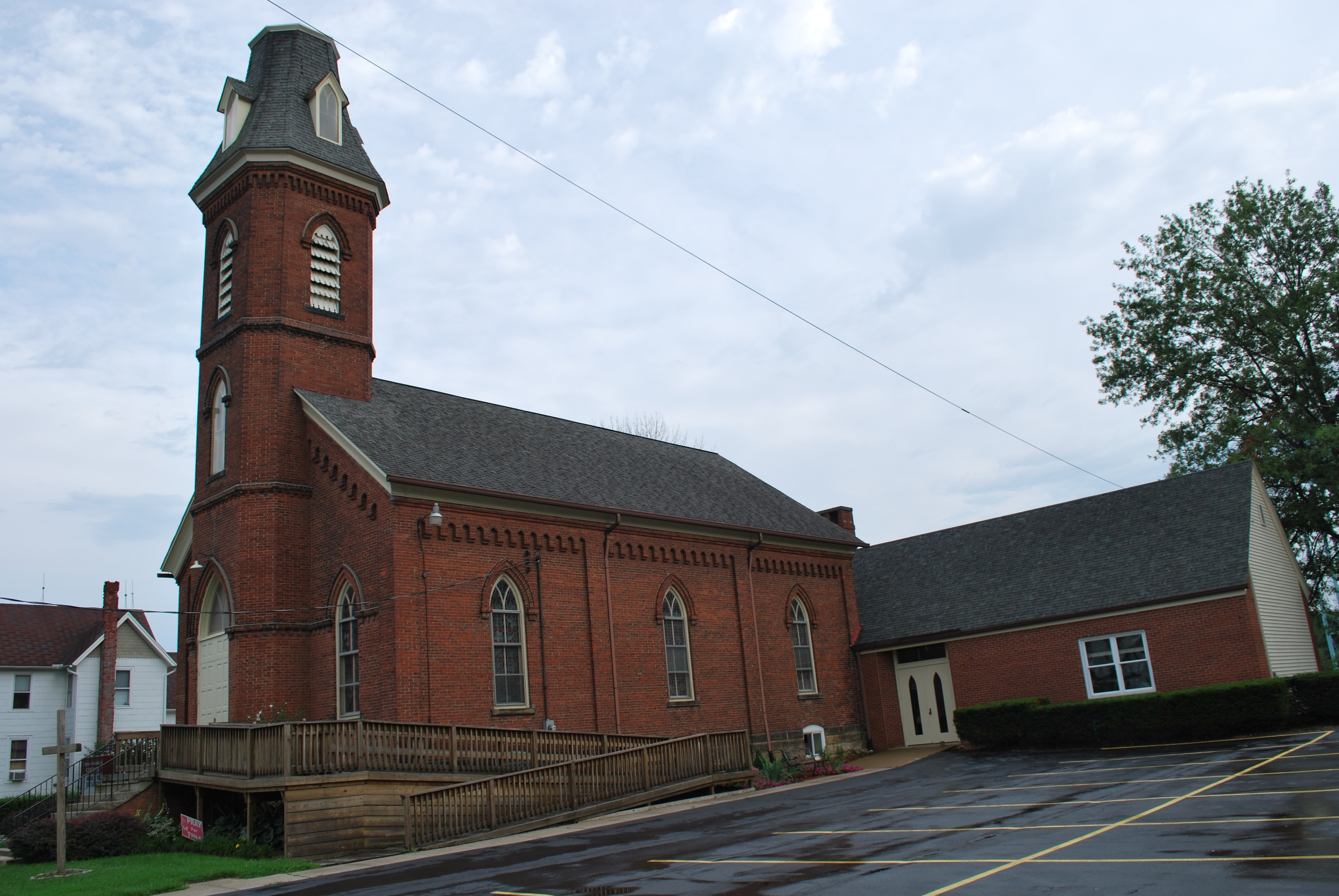

- Location within Ohio Location within the United States
- Location: 511 Church St., Kipton, Ohio
- Coordinates: 41°15′56″N 82°18′15″W
- Area: less than one acre
- Built: 1879
- Architect: Scott, John; Et al.
- Architectural style: Gothic
- NRHP reference No.: 82003606
- Added to NRHP: March 15, 1982

Union Church (Kipton Community Church) is a historic church at 511 Church Street in Kipton, Ohio.

It was built in 1879 and added to the National Register in 1982.
