= 1897 Kolomyia rail accident =

1897 railway bridge collapse disaster in Kolomyia, Austria-Hungary (Ukraine)

- Rail catastrophe in Kolomea (Kolomyia, Österreichische Illustrierte Zeitung, 1897)

Details
- Date: 26 June 1897 c. 0:55 AM
- Location: between Kolomyia and Turka railway stations, Galicia
- Coordinates: 48.552077°N 25.061508°E
- Country: Austria-Hungary (present-day Ukraine)
- Line: Lviv–Chernivtsi railway
- Incident type: Bridge collapse

Statistics
- Deaths: 9

The 1897 Kolomyia rail accident occurred on 26 June 1897 between Kolomyia and Turka, Austria-Hungary (present-day Ukraine) on the Lviv–Chernivtsi railway line. The railway bridge over the Kozachivka River damaged by flood collapsed under the weigh of crossing train, causing seven of its wagons to fall into the river and total loss of 9 lives. It is recorded as one of the major rail accidents in the history of rail transport in Ukraine of that era, and also the railway history of Austro-Hungarian Empire.

== Prelude ==
The railway line between Lviv and Stanislaviv became fully operational in May 1875, in the following few years the track was extended to Chernivtsi. About 1 km from the Kolomyia station a railway embankment and a bridge over the Kozachivka (Kozaczowka) River were built to overcome a river basin about 10 m wide and 1 m deep.

== Accident ==
Due to a massive summer storm of 26 June 1897 in the region a flash flood hit Kolomyia and surrounding villages, as it was common for this low-leveled area. Kozachivka also gained its water power and caused damage on both of the bridge foundations, bringing it to a state of dangerous instability.

Shortly after of early morning of 26 June a passenger train Nr. 314, consisted of a locomotive engine, its tender, three service and nine passenger cars, was leaving Kolomyia station on his way to Stanislaviv and Lviv, delayed by the storm already. Around 0:45 PM the train passed a signal station with free-track signal, as no-one was able to be informed about a flood damage. Few minutes before 1:00 AM the train started to cross the bridge. The structure collapsed immediately as it couldn't withstand the pressure a moving train, dragging the engine, tender, two freight and two troops wagons into the quick-stream water below. The last five train cars remained on the embankment intact. The individual cars slid down the slope for a few minutes before the reaching the bottom of Kozachivka. Passengers and railway workers then had to save themselves by climbing on the collapsed wagons on the ground or to swim in a flooded river, sometimes ejecting themselves through the windows.

== Aftermath ==
Photographs of the crash site (by photographer Jurkowicz from Kolomyia, 27 June 1897)

9 people in total were killed during the event (from which about 7 railway workers), many more were injured. Most of them were railway servicemen travelling in the first of three service cars behind the engine. Two deceased passengers were Viennese businessman Adolf Mahler, owner of the Mahler & Sohn clothing company, who was in Galicia on a business trip, and Dr. Franz Zeiler from Chernivtsi, military surgeon of the 41st Bukowina Infantry Regiment. Faith of Dr. Zeiler was especially unfortunate: few days earlier he married his fiancée and they were travelling on their honeymoon. Both bodies were recovered, already looted by the locals, a few tens meters from the fall site insisting both of them drowning.

The accident got extraordinary attention in the media across Austria-Hungary. The disaster site was also personally visited by Archduke Leopold Salvator of Austria, member of ruling Habsburg family. It took more than two days for the workers to excavate residues of the crashed wagons from the river, using a railway crane.

== See also ==
- Kolomyia
- Rail transport in Ukraine
- List of rail accidents (1890–1899)
