= List of rail accidents (1890–1899) =

This is a list of rail accidents from 1890 to 1899.

== 1890 ==
- March 4 – United Kingdom – A London and North Western Railway express train from London to Scotland ran away on the downgrade from Shap to Carlisle on the Caledonian Railway and crashed into a stationary locomotive, killing four people. The train had automatic vacuum brakes, but the locomotive was also equipped for simple vacuum brake working, and the driver had become confused and selected the wrong mode.
- March 21 – United Kingdom – An accident involving a South Eastern Railway train at St Johns, London killed three people.
- August 19 – United States – 1890 Quincy train wreck, Quincy, Massachusetts: A jack used to level rails was left on the tracks. A passenger train then collided with it causing a derailment. Twenty-four people were killed due to the impact of the collision and through scalding.
- September 19 – United States – Shoemakersville, Berks County, Pennsylvania: Two coal trains on the Reading Railroad collided leaving debris on the adjacent passenger track. An approaching express passenger train derailed (engine, tender, baggage car, mail car, and three of the five passenger cars) into the Schuylkill River killing 22 people and injuring 30.
- October 23 – United States – near Hinton, West Virginia, on the Chesapeake and Ohio Railway, the eastbound Fast Flying Virginian struck a rockslide on the tracks, resulting in the death of the engineer. This accident was immortalized by the ballad Engine One-Forty-Three.
- November 11 – United Kingdom – Norton Fitzwarren rail crash, England: A passenger train collided with a freight train that had been shunted onto the main line when the signalman forgot the line was obstructed. Ten people were killed and 11 seriously injured.
- November 28 – United Kingdom – On the North British Railway two trains, both headed by NBR D class 0-6-0 locomotives, crashed head-on on the Todd's Mill Viaduct; one locomotive plunged 60 feet (18 m) off the bridge.
- December 17 -Canada - Lévis, Quebec. A passenger train derailed when a bridge failed. Several passengers and crew members on the train were killed.

== 1891 ==
- March 8 – United Kingdom – A Great Western Railway passenger train was derailed by a snowdrift at Camborne, Cornwall.
- April 19 – United States – Kipton, Ohio, United States: A passenger train and a freight train collided just east of the Kipton depot killing eight. The accident was attributed to one of the engineers' watches having stopped and being four minutes behind. Webster Clay Ball, watch dealer and inspector of Cleveland, Ohio was later appointed as Watch Inspector for the Lake Shore and Michigan Southern Railroad.
- May 1 – United Kingdom – Norwood Junction rail accident: A London Brighton and South Coast Railway passenger train derailed near Norwood Junction, London when a cast iron bridge collapsed. A few minor injuries resulted.
- May 17 – United States – Greenvale, New York, United States: A horse's hoof caught in the switching apparatus at Greenvale (LIRR station) resulted in both the death of the horse and two crew members, as well as the destruction of the station house.
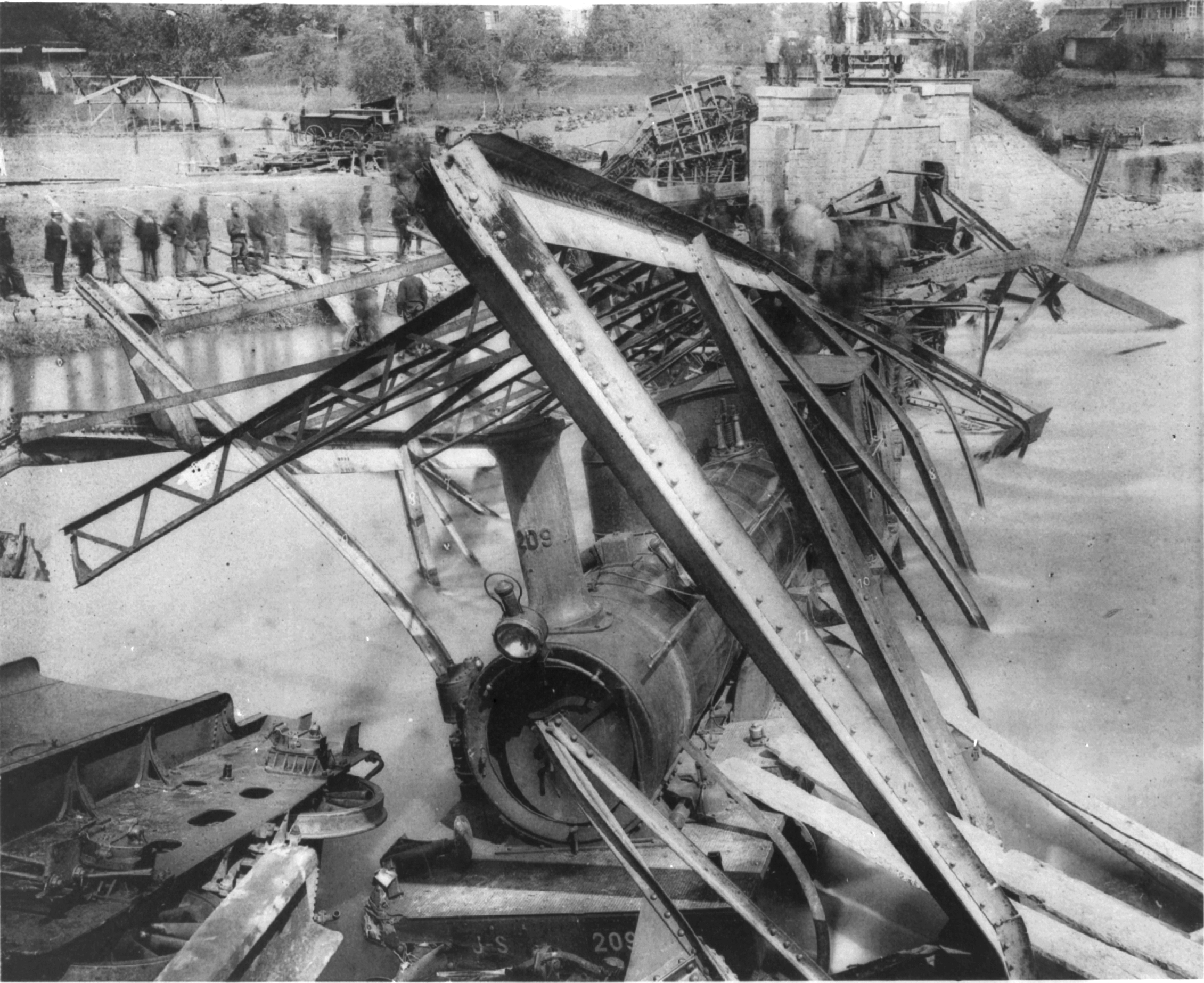
- Münchenstein rail disaster
  June 14 – Switzerland – Münchenstein rail disaster - Münchenstein, Basel: An iron-girder bridge collapsed as a crowded passenger train passed, killing 71 and injuring 171.
- July 3 - United States – Ravenna, Ohio: On the Erie road a freight train ran into a stationary passenger train from behind. Three cars were telescoped and fire claimed 19 victims, 23 injured.
- August 27 – United States – Statesville, North Carolina: A passenger train of the Western North Carolina Railroad derailed upon reaching a bridge, plunging to the creek below, killing 22 and injuring 26.
- August 31 – United Kingdom – A London, Chatham and Dover Railway empty stock train overran the buffers at Ramsgate Town station, Kent killing one.
- September 9 – United States – Oyster Bay, New York: A boiler explosion of a locomotive at Oyster Bay (LIRR station) resulted in the deaths of three crewmembers. The Long Island Railroad locomotive had replaced the one that was involved in the wreck in Greenvale in May 1891.
- October 17 – United Kingdom – A Great Eastern Railway passenger train derailed at Lavenham, Suffolk.
- October 22 - Canada - Two Canadian Pacific Railway freight trains collided at a siding between Kemnay and Brandon, Manitoba. One train had extra cabooses containing passengers, several of whom were either killed or badly injured.
- December 4 – United States – Great East Thompson Train Wreck; East Thompson, Connecticut: Four trains collided on the New York and New England Railroad. Two freight trains collided due to sloppy dispatching, jackknifing several cars. The Long Island & Eastern States Express passenger train then hit the wreckage, killing the engineer and fireman. Shortly thereafter, despite an attempt to flag it down, the Norwich Steamboat Express ran into the rear of the Eastern States Express, setting the last sleeper on fire as well as the locomotive cab. In all, only two passengers were killed; the body of one was never found.
- United States – Delta, California: An elephant traveling on a Southern Pacific train removed a coupling pin from a car. The forward portion of the train traveled 20 miles (32 km) before the locomotive crew discovered the split.

== 1892 ==
- February 22 – United Kingdom – A London, Brighton and South Coast Railway passenger train ran into a South Eastern Railway locomotive at Hastings, East Sussex. The passenger train overran a danger signal damaging both locomotives.
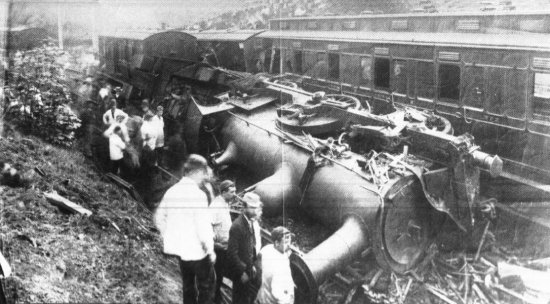
- Esholt Junction crash. (June 9, 1892)
  June 9 – United Kingdom – Esholt Junction rail crash - A Midland Railway passenger train overran signals and collided with another at Esholt Junction, Yorkshire killing five and injuring thirty.
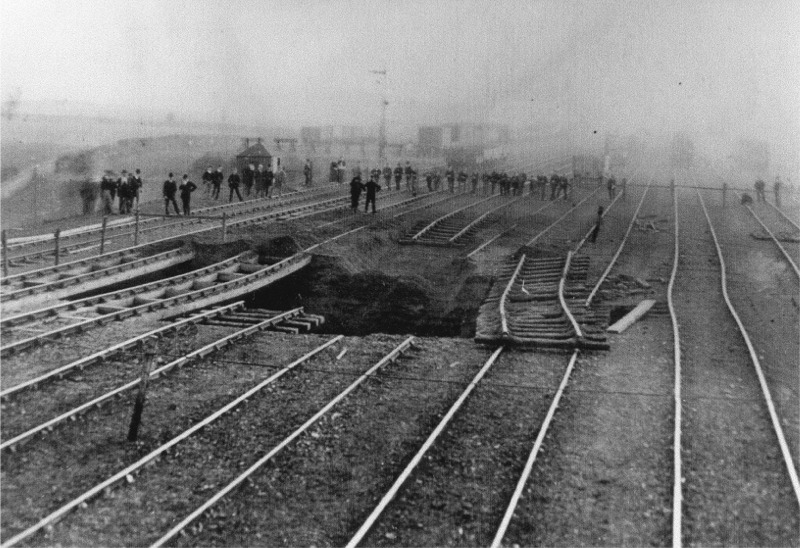
- Lindal railway incident
  September 22 - United Kingdom - Lindal railway incident - A locomotive shunting was suddenly swallowed up by the ground collapsing beneath into a sinkhole, and remains there today. No injuries reported.
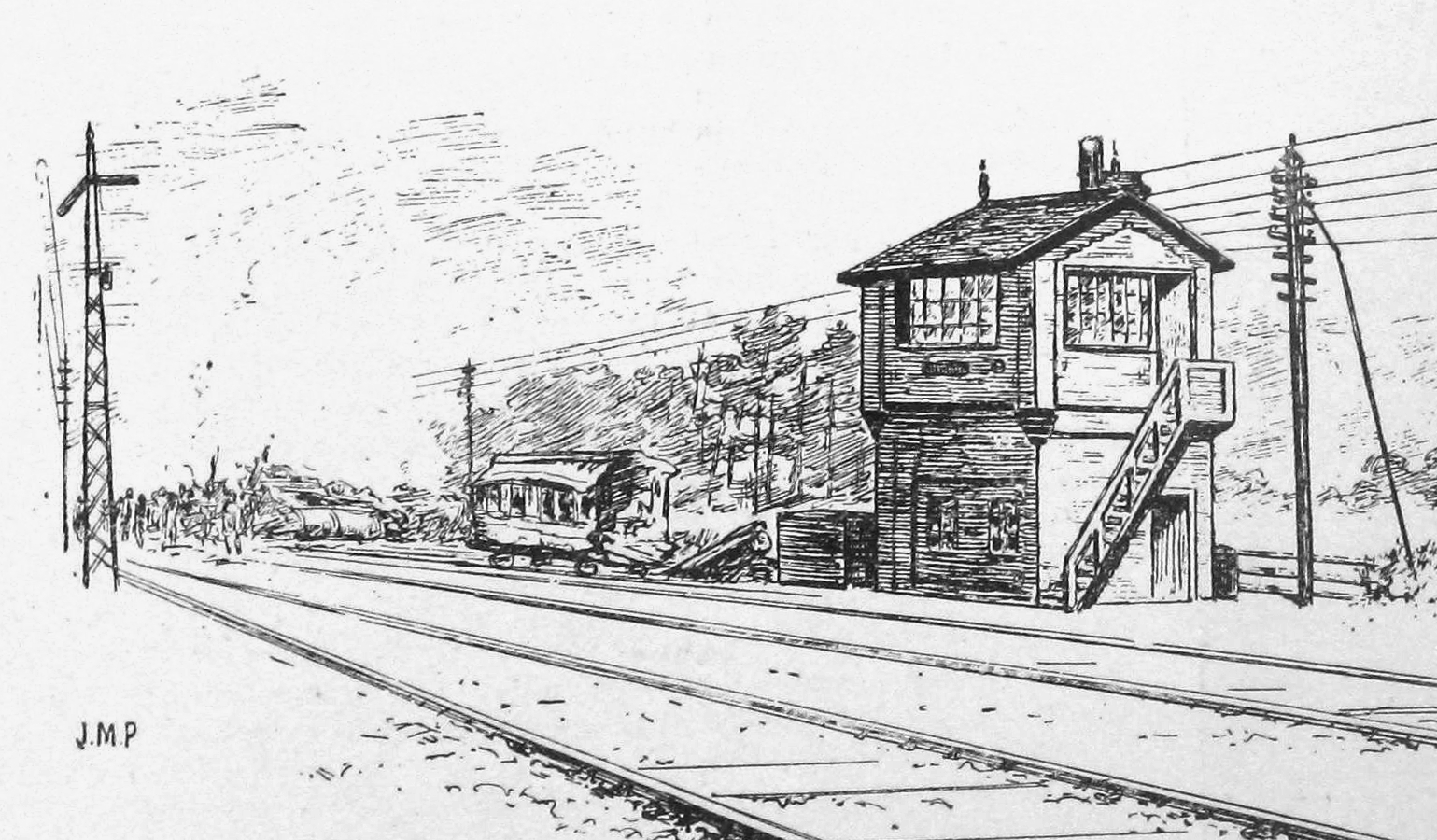
- 1892 Thirsk rail crash
  November 2 – United Kingdom – Thirsk rail crash, Thirsk, Yorkshire, England: a signalman suffering from distress and lack of sleep due to a family emergency forgot about a freight train standing outside his signal box. Eight people were killed and 39 injured.

== 1893 ==
- January 18 – United States – Lonsdale, Rhode Island. Eight of 23 sleigh ride passengers were killed when a sleigh collided with a Providence & Worcester Railroad freight train. Several horses were killed. Six passengers died at the scene and two died at Rhode Island Hospital. The sleigh ride was coming to Cumberland after an evening excursion from North Attleboro, Massachusetts. The engine's operator told investigators that weather conditions were very cold that night and speculated that the sleigh riders never heard the train whistle. Witnesses said because of a bend of the railroad, the passengers of the sleigh never saw the train that hit them.
- May 30 - United States - Tyrone, Pennsylvania - Walter L. Main Circus train wreck, a circus train going down a curved embankment lost control and derailed. 5 of the circus workers were killed, plus a number of animal casualties ranging from 50 to 72. Unharmed animals managed to escape the wreck and were reported being seen in the countryside for months after the wreck.
- July 18 - United States - East Aurora, New York. A derailment involving a twelve-car excursion train returning from a Lime Lake, New York summer picnic, by the Western New York and Pennsylvania Railroad. Engine #124 landed on Engine #30.
- August 6 - United States - Lindsey, Ohio. 3 were killed and hundreds injured when the sleeper cars on the Chicago Express of the Lake Shore and Michigan Southern Railway derailed and crashed into a freight train waiting on a siding. Among the injured were members of the Chicago Colts baseball team.
- August 12 – United Kingdom – Llantrisant rail accident, 13 were killed when mechanical failure led to derailment.
- August 31 – United States – Chester train wreck, a bridge collapse plunged four train cars into the Westfield River, killing 14 people.

== 1894 ==
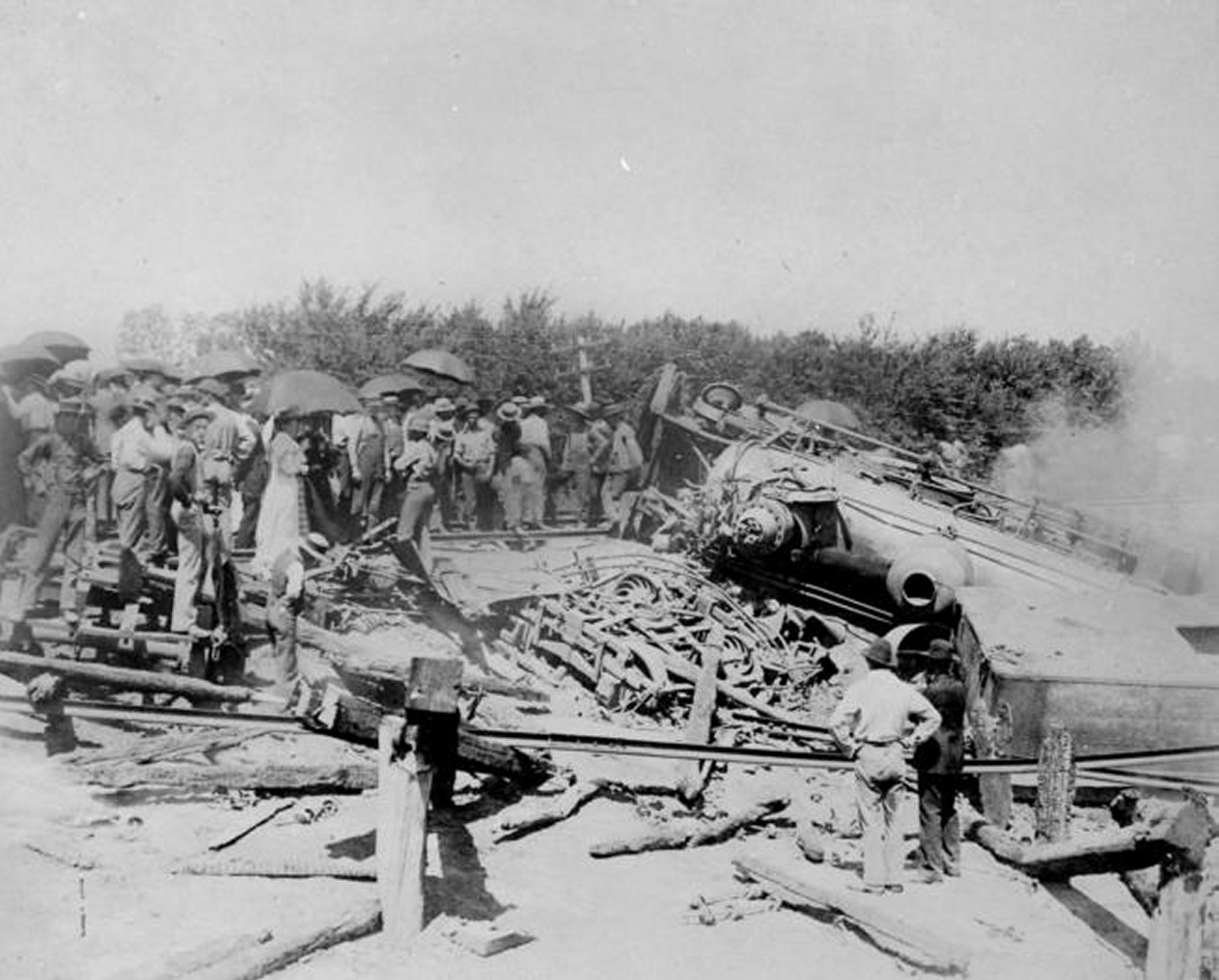
- Aftermath of the 1894 Rock Island railroad wreck
  August 9 – United States – 1894 Rock Island railroad wreck, Lincoln, Nebraska: Determined to be an act of sabotage. Eleven of 33 passengers died.
- October 4 – United Kingdom – A North Eastern Railway sleeping car express overran signals and collided with the rear of a freight train at Castle Hills, Yorkshire. One person was killed. The passengers included two Cabinet ministers, Arnold Morley and Lord Tweedmouth.
- November 12 – United Kingdom – A Great Western Railway boat train was derailed in a flood at Yetminster, Dorset.
- December 22 – United Kingdom – Chelford rail accident: During shunting operations, strong winds blew a high-sided wagon into other wagons. It derailed, blocking the main line, and was then struck by an oncoming express train, killing 14 passengers.
- December 22 – United Kingdom – A light engine collided with a South Eastern Railway passenger train at Purley, Surrey injuring six.

== 1895 ==
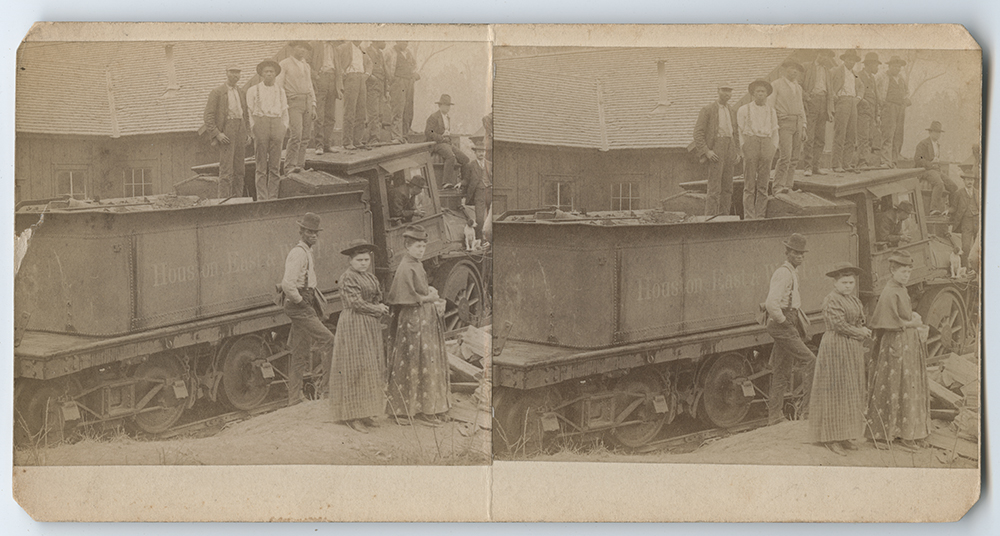
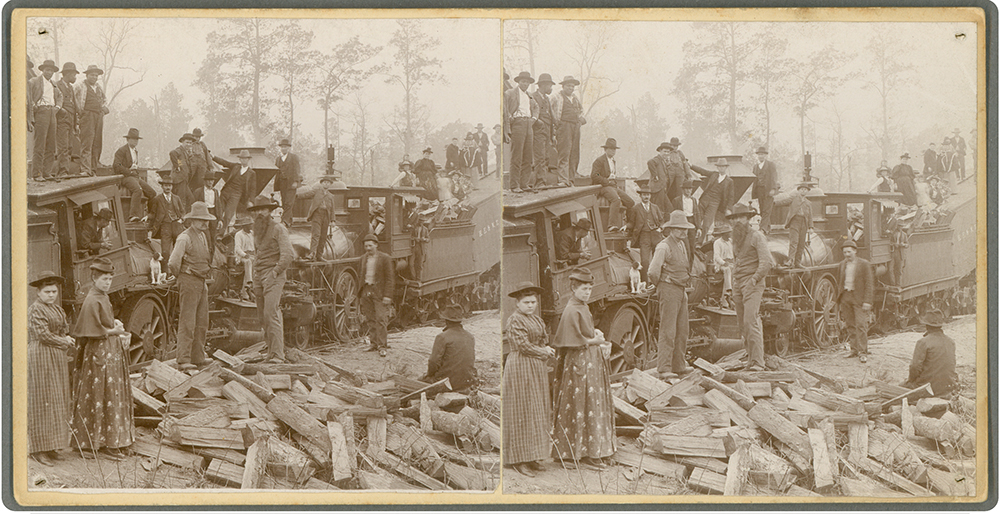
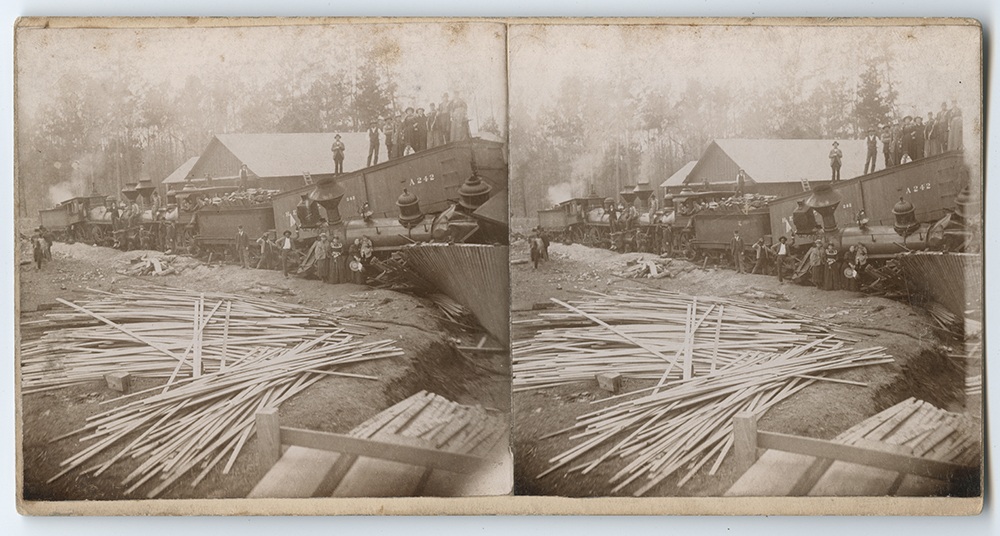
  Three stereoscopic views of the wreck on the Houston East and West Texas Railway north of Lufkin, Texas
  (no date in source) – United Kingdom – One of the Manning Wardle engines on the Wotton Tramway startles a horse near the track; it moves forward and pulls a farm machine over the farm worker, who is killed. He was formerly a track worker on the tramway.
- February 27 – United States – A freight train and a log train collide on the Houston East and West Texas Railway north of Lufkin, Texas; an unknown person stole a third locomotive and ran it into the two stalled trains and then fled.
- April 13 – United Kingdom – A Great Western Railway passenger train derailed between Doublebois and Bodmin Road. The cause was found to be damaged track caused by excessive speed of the previous train.
- August 1 – United Kingdom – A London, Chatham and Dover Railway freight train collided with an excursion train at Herne Bay, Kent killing one.
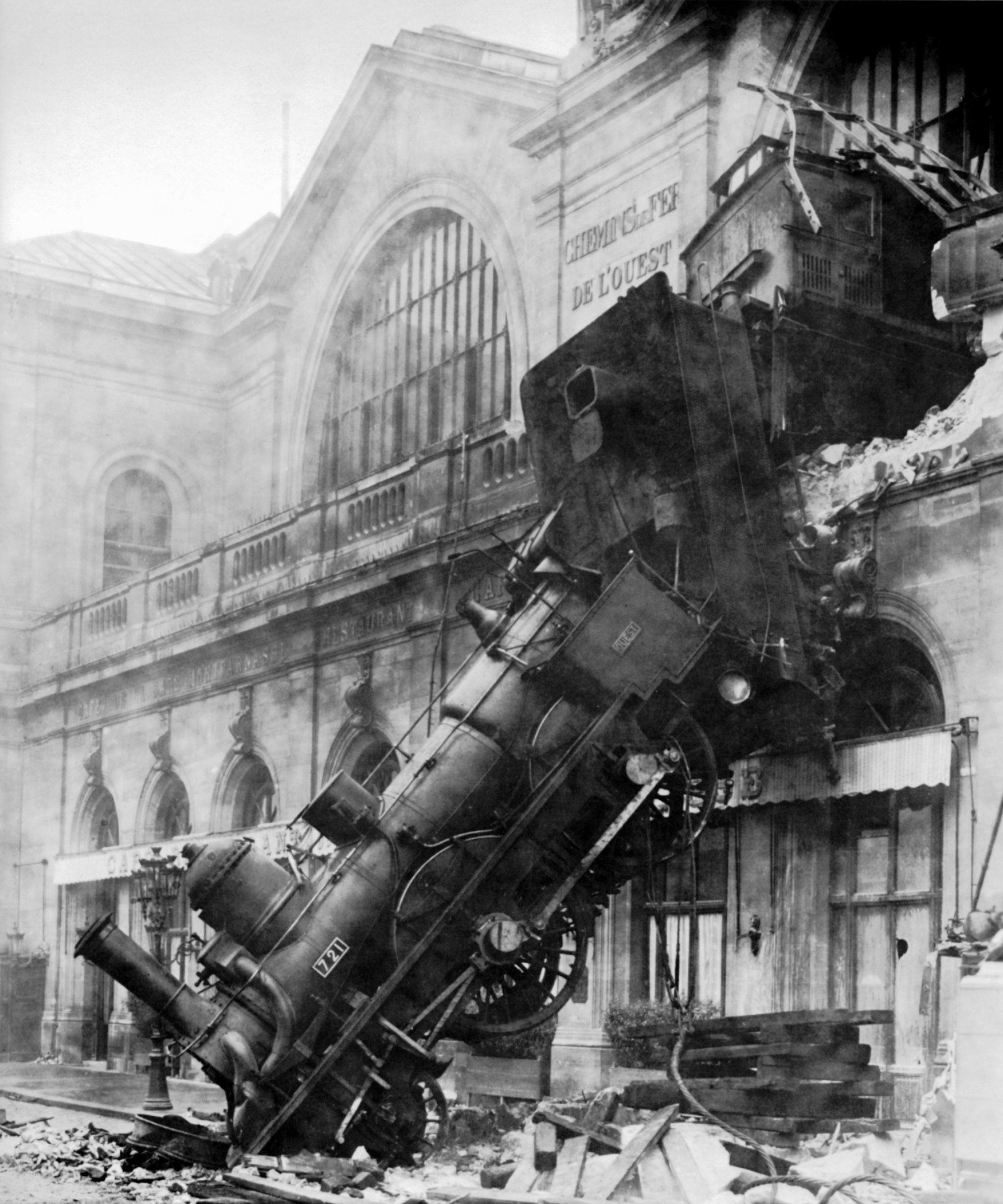
- Train goes too far at Gare Montparnasse, Paris. (October 22, 1895)
  October 22 – France – Montparnasse derailment — At Gare Montparnasse, Paris, an express train overran a buffer stop because the driver approached the station too fast and a Westinghouse air brake failure. It crossed about 30 metres (98 ft) of concourse before plummeting through a window and crushing one person in a shop below. The locomotive remained outside the station for several days and attracted a number of photographers.
- November 10 – United Kingdom – A Great Northern Railway train derailed at St Neots, killing two people.
- December 22 – United Kingdom – A London and North Western Railway express passenger train collided with a freight wagon which had run away and fouled the main line. Fourteen people were killed and 79 were injured.

== 1896 ==
- March 7 – United Kingdom – The last carriage of a Great Northern Railway passenger train derailed at Little Bytham, Lincolnshire, causing other carriages to derail. The cause was found to be the premature removal of a speed restriction. Two people were killed.
- Easter Monday, April 6 – United Kingdom – Llanberis, Wales: On the opening day of the Snowdon Mountain Railway, locomotive No. 1 Ladas ran away plummeted down a steep slope after it derailed. The engine was destroyed, but the driver and fireman were able to jump clear and the carriages were stopped by the guard. One passenger jumped off the moving train and fell beneath the wheels. He later died from his injuries. The line then closed for over a year before re-opening on April 19, 1897.
- May 26 – Canada – in Victoria, British Columbia, Point Ellice Bridge disaster: a passenger train with 143 passengers aboard crashed through Point Ellice Bridge into the Upper Harbour. Fifty-five were killed. A coroner's jury concluded that the tramway operator, the Consolidated Electric Railway Company, was responsible because it allowed the streetcar to be loaded with a greater number of passengers than the bridge was designed to support.
- July 30 – United States – 1896 Atlantic City rail crash – two trains collided at a crossing just west of Atlantic City, New Jersey, crushing five loaded passenger coaches, killing 50 and seriously injuring around 60.
- August 3 – United Kingdom – A Lancashire and Yorkshire Railway passenger train collided with a West Lancashire Railway passenger train at Preston Junction, Lancashire because the driver of the former had misread signals. One person was killed and seven were injured.
- August 15 – United Kingdom – A London and North Western Railway sleeping car express derailed at Preston, Lancashire due to excessive speed on a curve. One person was killed.
- August 29 – United Kingdom – The locomotive of a Charing Cross-to-Hastings train derailed near Etchingham, East Sussex when it collided with a traction engine and threshing machine using an occupation crossing.
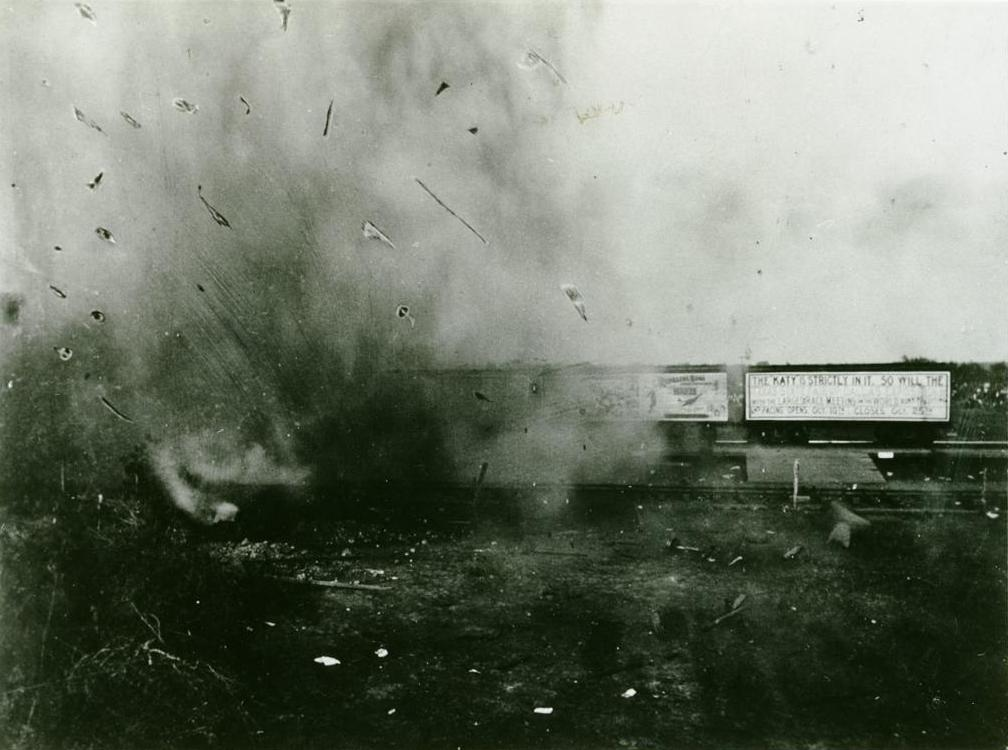
- Crash at Crush
  September 15 – United States – The Crash at Crush – Showman William George Crush convinced officials of the Missouri-Kansas-Texas Railroad (MKT, known as "the Katy"), to let him stage a colossal train wreck. The crowd was transported to the show site, near the town of West, Texas, producing much passenger revenue for the company. A one-day town is thrown up and named Crush, boasting a 2,100 foot (640 m) platform and tank cars supplying 100 faucets. Two six-car trains of obsolete rolling stock, pulled by dolled-up locomotives were let loose at each other over a 1 mile (1.6 km) course with spectacular result. When the wrecked engines' boilers exploded, flying shrapnel killed at least three of the 30,000 spectators (some sources estimate 40,000) and injured many more.
- December 4 – United States – A freight train consisting of Engine No. 155 and twenty-six cars of freight was running from Brattleboro, Vermont to New London, Connecticut. Just outside Eagleville, Connecticut the train became uncoupled between cars 10 and 11. As the crew in the back tried to stop the back part of the train, the crew in the locomotive increased speed to gain distance from the uncoupled cars. The boiler exploded killing brakeman Warren Thomas, Engineer Otis Hall, and his brother, fireman Benjamin Hall.
- December 27 – United States – A passenger train, No. 41 of the Birmingham Mineral Railroad, plunged through a bridge 110 feet (34 m) over the Cahaba River, east of West Blocton, Alabama, killing 22 or 23 of the 31 people on board, many burned beyond recognition.

== 1897 ==
- January 23 - United States - A train partially derailed after striking a boulder 7 miles (11 km) north of Oakdale, Tennessee. The boulder was suspected to have fallen onto the tracks following recent rains. The engine's fireman was killed, and the engineer seriously injured. Passengers reported only minor injuries.
- January 26 – Canada – The regular westbound CP express train between Halifax and Montreal, hauled by an ICR engine, came off the rails outside Dorchester, New Brunswick, loaded with six tons (5.4 t) of freshly minted Canadian pennies from London. Two people were killed and 38 injured, including the Canadian Minister of the Militia, Frederick William Borden. It is known as "The Penny Wreck".
- May 1 – Russia – A military train derailed 3 kilometres (1.9 mi) north of Puka, Governorate of Livonia. 58 people were killed and 44 injured in the accident.
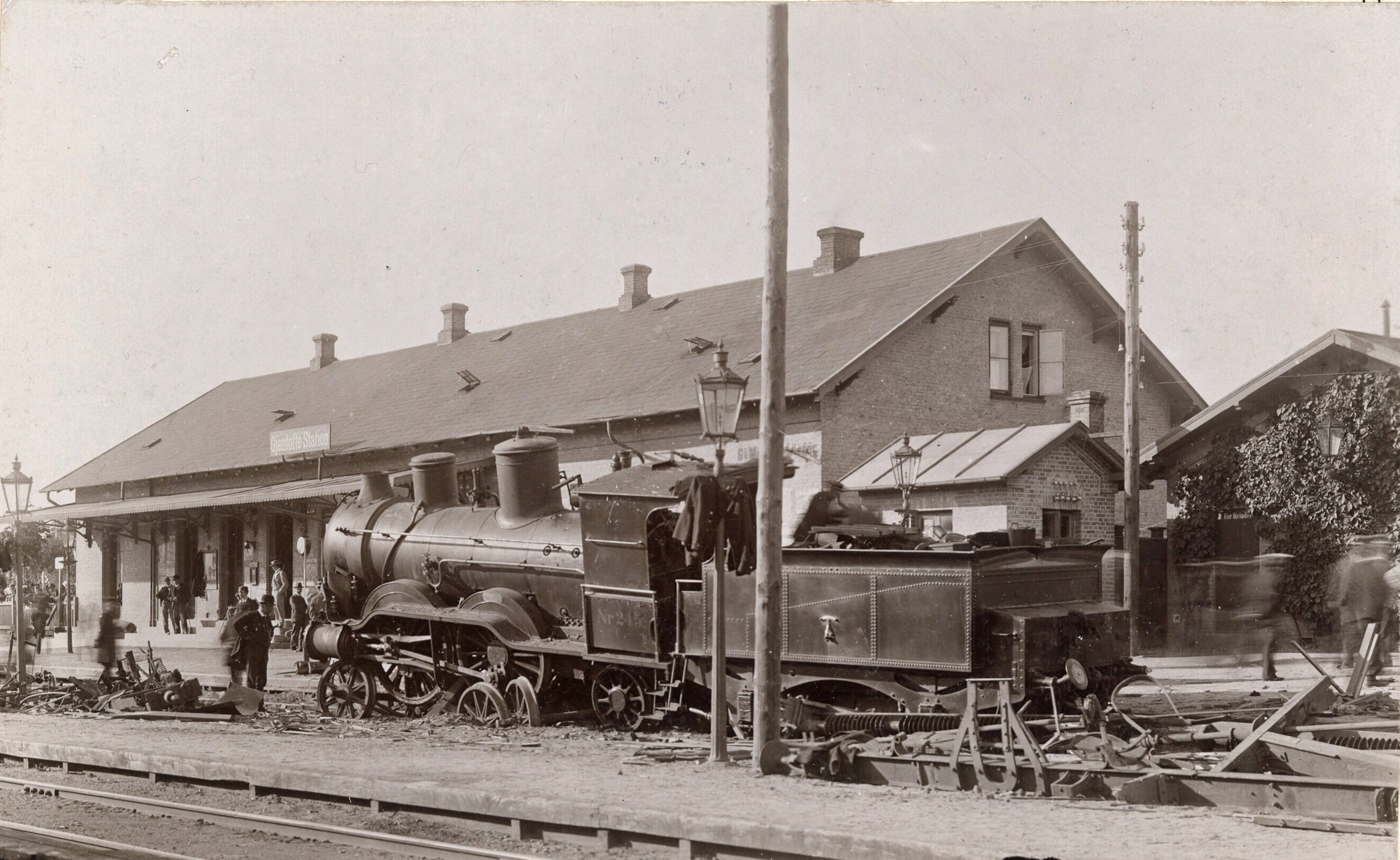
- 1897 Gentofte train crash
  June 11 – Denmark – Gentofte train crash, Denmark: An express train passed a signal at danger and collided with a stationary passenger train at Gentofte station. Forty were killed and more than 100 injured.
- June 11 – United Kingdom – Welshampton rail crash - eleven were killed when an excursion train derailed.
- June 26 – Austria–Hungary (Ukraine) – 1897 Kolomyia rail accident: collapse of a railway bridge over the Kozaczowka Creek near Kolomyia, Ivano-Frankivsk Oblast, damaged by a flood, under the weigh of crossing train caused twelve of its wagons to fall into the river and total loss of 9 lives.
- June 30 – United States – West Chicago, Ill. Collision of two trains of the Chicago and Northwestern R.R. Three killed and 20-30 injured.
- June 30 – United States – West Terre Haute, IN. Vandalia R.R. 1 killed and 3 reported fatally injured.
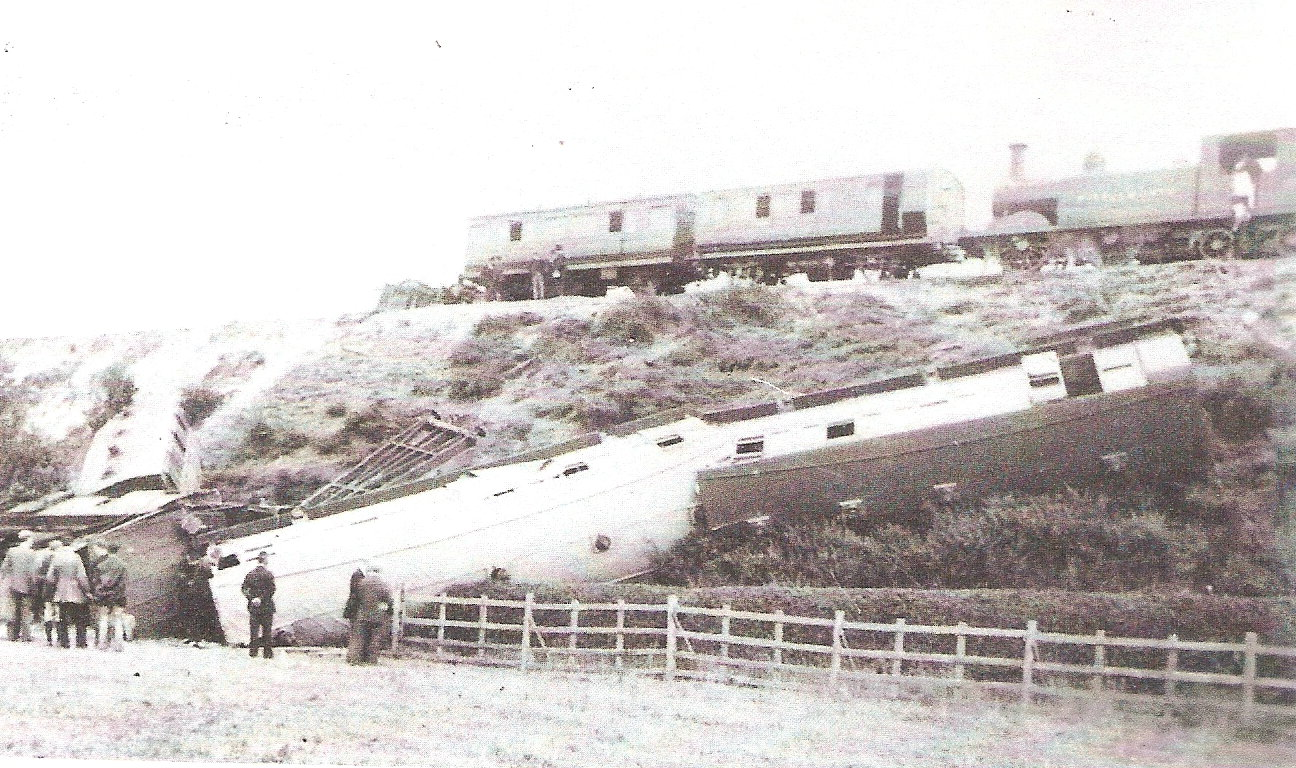
- Heathfield derailment. (September 1, 1897)
  September 1 – United Kingdom – A passenger train derailed near Heathfield, East Sussex, killing the driver.
- before September 26 1897 – India – Maddur railway bridge collapse – Collapse of railway bridge, damaged by a flood, near Maddur caused a derailment of five fully loaded carriages and drowning of about 150 passengers.
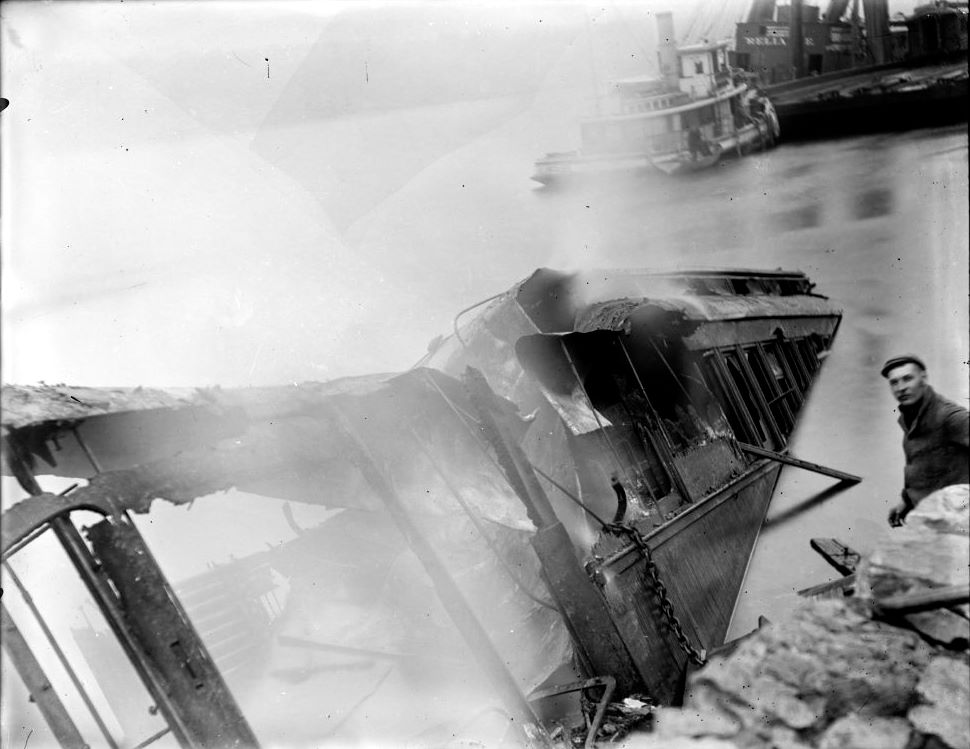
- Garrison Train Wreck. (October 24, 1897)
  October 24 – United States – Garrison train crash in Garrison, New York, the Sunday morning train No. 46, on the New York Central & Hudson River Railroad, wrecked near King's Dock of the Hudson River division, about 1.75 miles (2.82 km) south of Garrison, New York. 19 were killed.
- November 4 – Canada – A Canadian Pacific Railway freight train collided with a parked CPR yard engine at the station at Havelock, Ontario resulting in three employees being injured, seven cars derailed, two locomotives severely damaged and the main track being blocked. Preliminary investigations suggested that the yard engine should not have been on the siding.

== 1898 ==
- January 3 – United Kingdom – A North British Railway freight train derailed at Dunbar, Lothian when hit by an express passenger train which overran signals. One person was killed and 21 injured.
- January 29 – United States – A Maine Central Railroad train crashed near Orono. The accident killed six.
- United States – A Tallulah Falls Railway train pulling a children's excursion derailed due to bad track. The locomotive and baggage car toppled from the track. The baggage car fell onto its side and the locomotive rolled to the bottom of the embankment, killing the engineer. No children were injured.
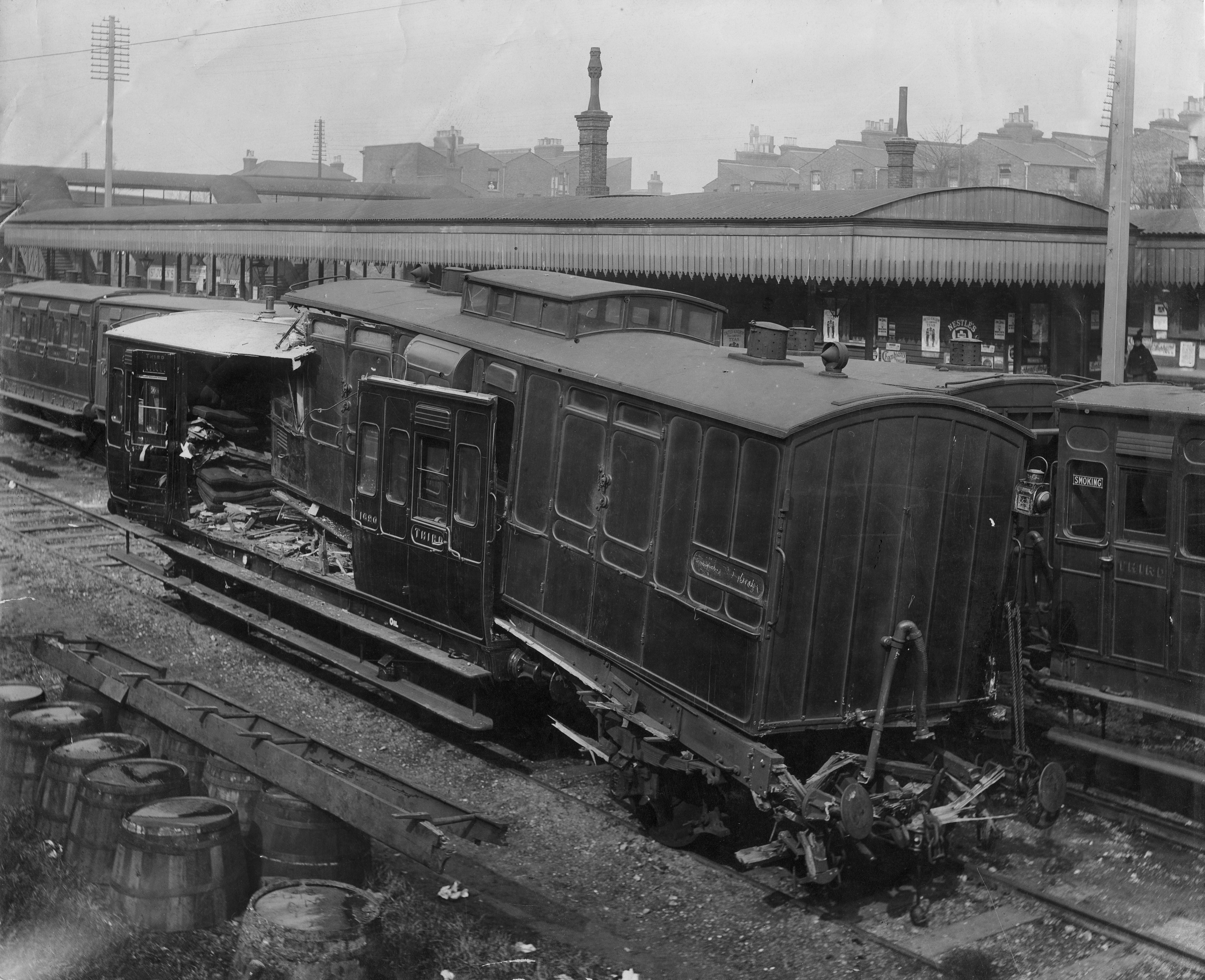
- Damaged carriages in the siding next to St Johns Station. (March 21, 1898)
  March 21 – United Kingdom – St Johns train crash 1898: A South Eastern and Chatham Railway passenger train ran into the rear of another passenger train at St Johns, London due to a signalman's error. Three people were killed and twenty injured.
- May 8 - United States - Columbus Ohio-Excursion train on Akron R.R. accident. 1 killed and 2 injured
- June 26 - United States - Two trains transporting the 2nd United States Volunteer Cavalry were involved in a rear-end collision near Tupelo, Mississippi. The first train had stopped to take on water before being struck by the second. Five passengers were killed and fifteen injured.
- August 16 – Cape Colony, South Africa – A rake of goods trucks, one of which was carrying 34 native passengers, ran away backwards from Mostertshoek passing loop, Great Karoo. They had not been properly braked on a falling gradient prior to the detachment of the goods train's locomotive. The runaway trucks eventually collided with the following fast mail/passenger train. In the collision, 27 of the native passengers were killed, as were five adults and one child aboard the mail/passenger train. Additionally, two Post Office officials and one of the drivers of the mail/passenger train were badly injured; others suffered minor injuries.
- September 2 – United Kingdom – Wellingborough rail accident: A parcels trolley fell off the platform at Wellingborough, Northamptonshire and was hit by a Midland Railway express train, which derailed. Seven people were killed and 65 injured.
- November 24 – United Kingdom – On the 3-foot (91 cm) gauge Tralee and Dingle Light Railway in what is now the Republic of Ireland, a train of one cattle waggon and three passenger cars was derailed by high winds between Lispole and Aunascaul. Of the four passengers on board, one was killed and two others injured.
- United States – The second major accident on the Tallulah Falls Railway occurred at the more than 100 feet (30 m) high Panther Creek trestle, the highest trestle on the line. When a passenger train reached the highest section of the bridge, the supports gave way beneath it, causing the locomotive, tender, and first car to fall into the ravine. The second coach remained on the still erect portion of the bridge, having stopped inches from the edge. One passenger was killed and no other injuries were reported.
- United Kingdom – A mail train derailed near Penryn, Cornwall. The Great Western Railway 3521 Class locomotives frequently experienced excessive oscillation when running at speed.

== 1899 ==
- January 12 – United Kingdom – A London and North Western Railway express freight train derailed at Penmaenmawr, Caernarfonshire because the formation was washed away in a storm. Both locomotive crew were killed.
- February 18 – Belgium – In heavy fog, the train from London to Brussels via Calais, ran into a train from Tial, which had stopped at the station of Forest, near Brussels. 19 persons were killed and 100+ injured. The Post Express - Feb 18, 1899
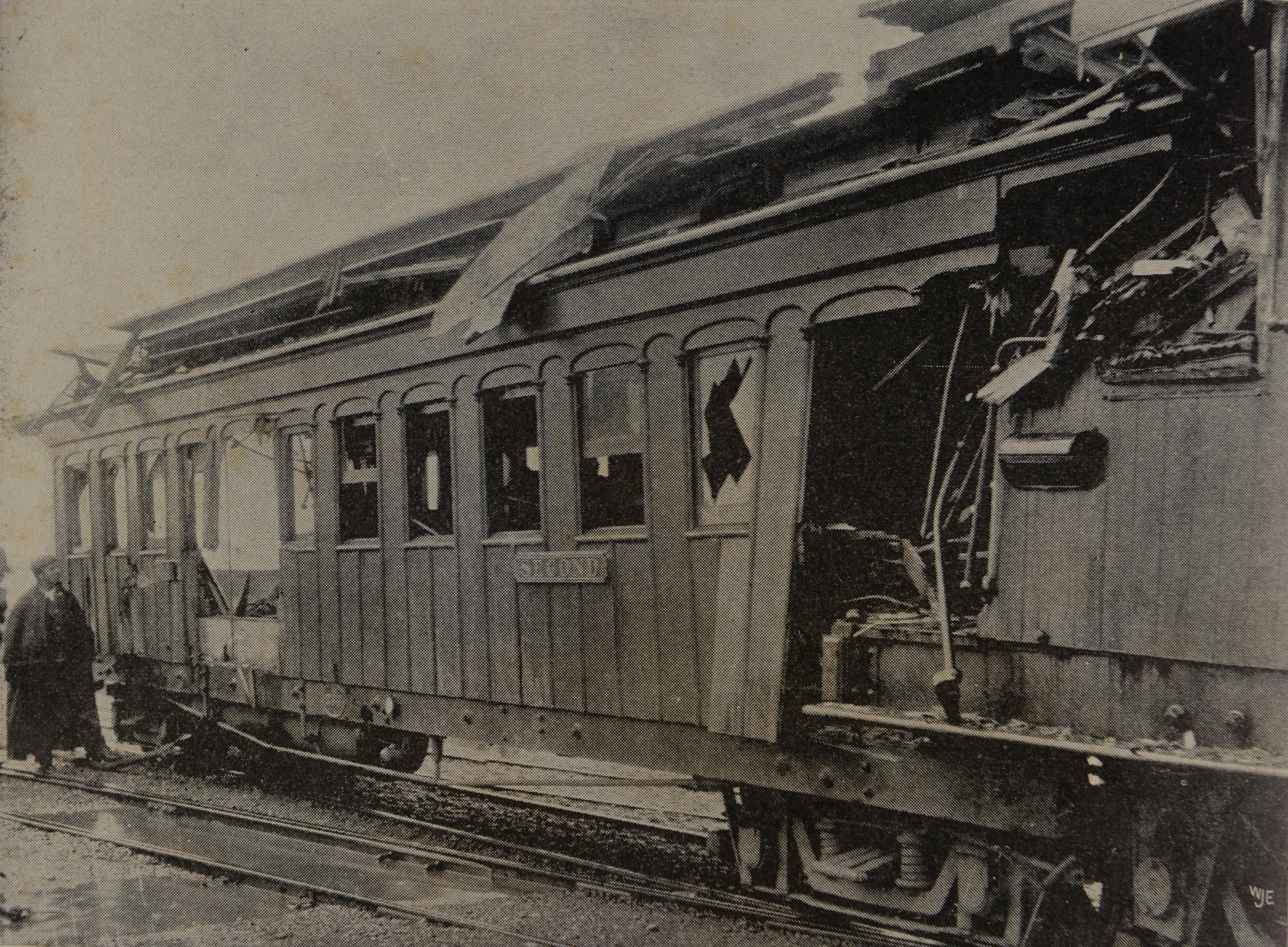
- Rakaia railway accident
  March 11 – New Zealand – Rakaia railway accident Two excursion trains returning from Ashburton to Christchurch collided when the second train rear-ended the first; four passengers were killed and 22 injured. The accident led to the fitting of air brakes to rolling stock and improved signalling.
- September 15 – United States – Missouri Pacific fast freight No. 124 crashed through a burning bridge between Paul and Julian, Nebraska, killing three men and derailing over 20 cars.
- September 20 – United States – Two St. Louis–San Francisco Railway (Frisco) trains, one passenger and one freight, hit head-on in Missouri. Four people were killed.
- October 23 – United Kingdom – A Caledonian Railway express train collided with a cattle train at Cupar, Angus. One person was killed.
- November 25 – United States – A Morgan Run Coal Company train carrying mine employees as well as some women and children collided head-on with a freight train near Coshocton, Ohio. Two passengers were killed, 38 injured.
- December 23 – United Kingdom – A rear-end collision occurred at Wivelsfield, West Sussex.

== See also ==
- London Underground accidents

== Sources ==
- "Europe's history of rail disasters". BBC. October 11, 2006.
- "World's worst rail disasters". BBC. December 19, 2007.
- "GenDisasters Train Wrecks 1869–1943". Archived from the original on 2015-04-16.
- "Interstate Commerce Commission Investigations of Railroad Accidents 1911–1993". U.S. Department of Transportation. Archived from the original on 2004-10-12.
- Beebe, Lucius & Clegg, Charles (1952). Hear the train blow; a pictorial epic of America in the railroad age. New York: Grosset & Dunlap. ASIN B000I83FTC.
- Earnshaw, Alan (1990). Trains in Trouble: Vol. 6. Penryn: Atlantic Books. ISBN 0-906899-37-0.
- Earnshaw, Alan (1991). Trains in Trouble: Vol. 7. Penryn: Atlantic Books. ISBN 0-906899-50-8.
- Earnshaw, Alan (1993). Trains in Trouble: Vol. 8. Penryn: Atlantic Books. ISBN 0-906899-52-4.
- Haine, Edgar A. (1993). Railroad Wrecks. New York: Cornwall Books. ISBN 978-0-8453-4844-4.
- Hall, Stanley (1990). The Railway Detectives. London: Ian Allan. ISBN 0-7110-1929-0.
- Hoole, Ken (1982). Trains in Trouble: Vol. 3. Redruth: Atlantic Books. ISBN 0-906899-05-2.
- Hoole, Ken (1983). Trains in Trouble: Vol. 4. Truro: Atlantic Books. ISBN 0-906899-07-9.
- Karr, Ronald D. (1995). The Rail Lines of Southern New England – A Handbook of Railroad History. Branch Line Press. ISBN 978-0-942147-02-5.
- Kidner, R. W. (1977) [1963]. The South Eastern and Chatham Railway. Tarrant Hinton: The Oakwood Press.
- Leslie, Frank (1882-01-21). Illustrated Newspaper. Vol. LIII, no. 1374. New York. p. 1.
- Lyle, Katie Letcher (1985). Scalded to Death by the Steam. London: W. H. Allen & Co. ISBN 0-491-03354-0.
- Reed, Robert C. (1968). Train Wrecks – A Pictorial History of Accidents on the Main Line. New York: Bonanza Books. ISBN 978-0-517-32897-2.
- Rolt, L. T. C.; Kichenside, G. M. (1982). Red for Danger: A history of railway accidents and railway safety (4th ed.). Newton Abbot, Devon: David & Charles. ISBN 0-7153-8362-0. OCLC 9526651.
- Shaw, Robert B. (1978). A History of Railroad Accidents, Safety Precautions and Operating Practices. LCCN 78104064.
- Trevena, Arthur (1980). Trains in Trouble: Vol. 1. Redruth: Atlantic Books. ISBN 0-906899-01-X.
- Trevena, Arthur (1981). Trains in Trouble: Vol. 2. Redruth: Atlantic Books. ISBN 0-906899-03-6.
