= Kipton, Ohio =

- Village
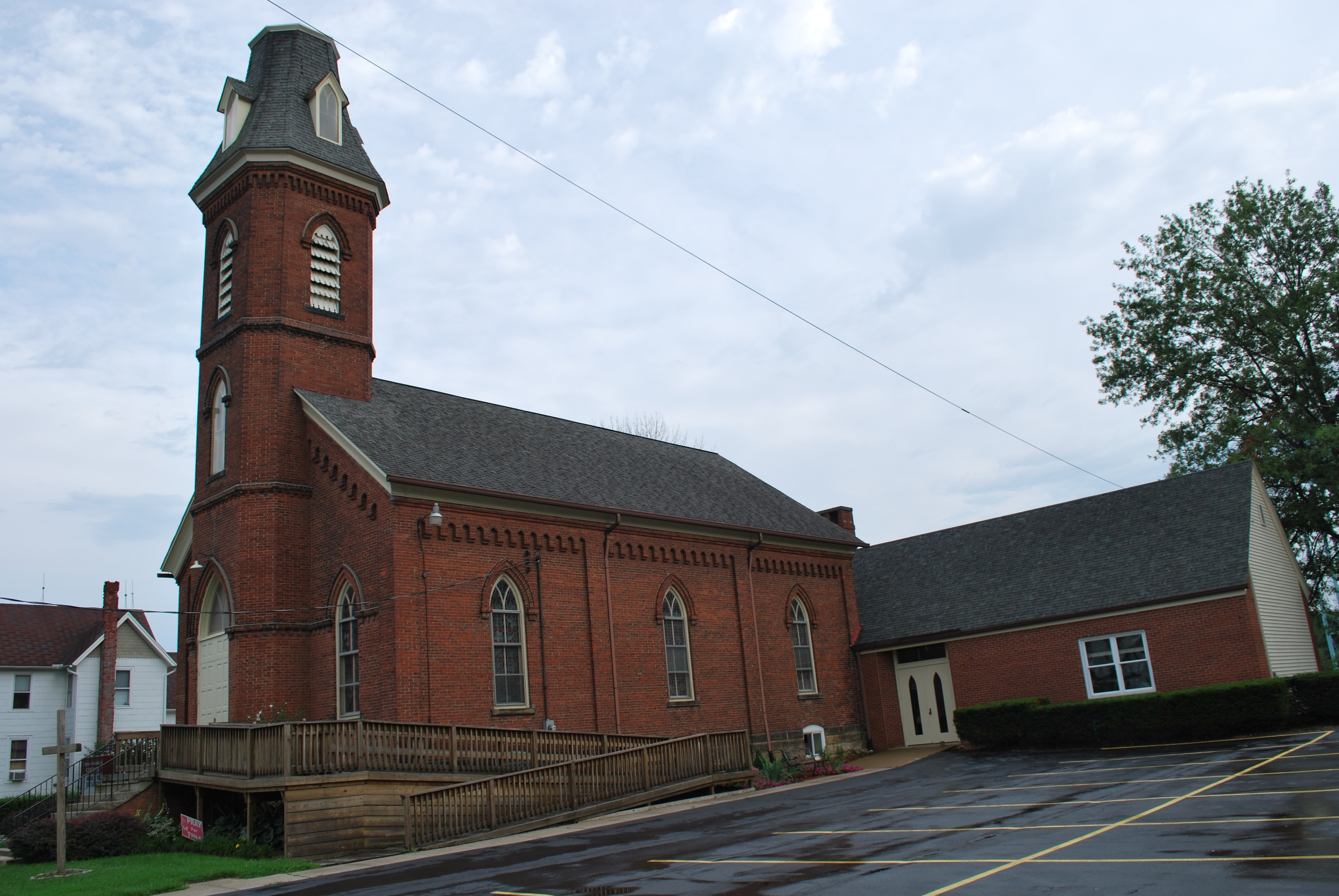
- Kipton Community Church

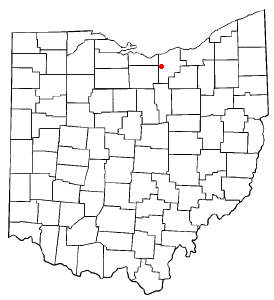
- Location of Kipton, Ohio

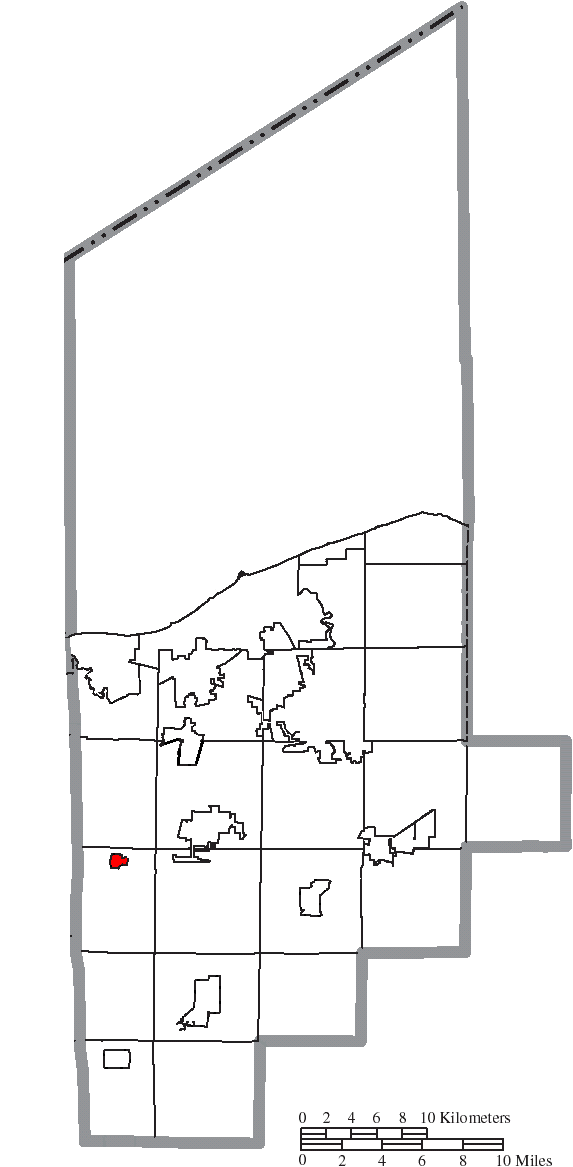
- Location of Kipton in Lorain County
- Coordinates: 41°15′59″N 82°18′14″W
- Country: United States
- State: Ohio
- County: Lorain
- Township: Camden

Government
  - Type: Village council

Area
  - Total: 0.44 sq mi (1.15 km^{2})
  - Land: 0.44 sq mi (1.14 km^{2})
  - Water: 0.0039 sq mi (0.01 km^{2})
- Elevation: 860 ft (260 m)

Population (2020)
  - Total: 209
  - Density: 474.5/sq mi (183.22/km^{2})
- Time zone: UTC-5 (Eastern (EST))
  - Summer (DST): UTC-4 (EDT)
- ZIP code: 44049
- Area code: 440
- FIPS code: 39-40544
- GNIS feature ID: 2398357

Kipton is a village in Lorain County, Ohio, United States. The population was 209 at the 2020 census.

== History ==
Kipton was platted around 1852 by Wm.W.Whitney in anticipation of a new railroad route being laid out through his farm. He initially named his new village "Binghamton", in honor of his former home of Binghamton, NY. However, the name "Camden Station" would instead be used until 1862, when its name was changed to "Kipton Station" (and later becoming known simply as 'Kipton').

For many years, Kipton continued as a stop along the Southern Division of the Lake Shore and Michigan Southern Railroad; however, the line was abandoned and pulled up in 1976. This former railroad route is now a part of a rail trail, the North Coast Inland Trail.

Kipton was the site of a disastrous train wreck on April 18, 1891, which was blamed on a train crew member's watch running slow; the wreck led to the adoption of stringent quality-control standards for railroad chronometers in 1893. An Ohio Historical marker in Kipton Community Park notes the details of the collision.

== Geography ==
According to the United States Census Bureau, the village has a total area of 0.45 square miles (1.17 km^{2}), of which 0.44 square miles (1.14 km^{2}) is land and 0.01 square miles (0.03 km^{2}) is water.

== Demographics ==
Historical population
Census	Pop.	Note	%±
1960	353		—
1970	353		0.0%
1980	352		−0.3%
1990	283		−19.6%
2000	265		−6.4%
2010	243		−8.3%
2020	209		−14.0%
U.S. Decennial Census

=== 2010 census ===
As of the census of 2010, there were 243 people, 102 households, and 72 families living in the village. The population density was 552.3 inhabitants per square mile (213.2/km^{2}). There were 108 housing units at an average density of 245.5 per square mile (94.8/km^{2}). The racial makeup of the village was 97.1% White, 0.8% from other races, and 2.1% from two or more races. Hispanic or Latino of any race were 2.5% of the population.

There were 102 households, of which 25.5% had children under the age of 18 living with them, 54.9% were married couples living together, 9.8% had a female householder with no husband present, 5.9% had a male householder with no wife present, and 29.4% were non-families. 24.5% of all households were made up of individuals, and 9.8% had someone living alone who was 65 years of age or older. The average household size was 2.38 and the average family size was 2.79.

The median age in the village was 42.8 years. 19.3% of residents were under the age of 18; 9.1% were between the ages of 18 and 24; 23.9% were from 25 to 44; 32.5% were from 45 to 64; and 15.2% were 65 years of age or older. The gender makeup of the village was 54.7% male and 45.3% female.

=== 2000 census ===
As of the census of 2000, there were 265 people, 105 households, and 76 families living in the village. The population density was 573.2 inhabitants per square mile (221.3/km^{2}). There were 108 housing units at an average density of 233.6 per square mile (90.2/km^{2}). The racial makeup of the village was 98.49% White, 0.75% African American, and 0.75% from two or more races. Hispanic or Latino of any race were 0.38% of the population.

There were 105 households, out of which 32.4% had children under the age of 18 living with them, 58.1% were married couples living together, 10.5% had a female householder with no husband present, and 26.7% were non-families. 22.9% of all households were made up of individuals, and 9.5% had someone living alone who was 65 years of age or older. The average household size was 2.52 and the average family size was 2.92.

In the village, the population was spread out, with 24.9% under the age of 18, 9.8% from 18 to 24, 31.7% from 25 to 44, 20.4% from 45 to 64, and 13.2% who were 65 years of age or older. The median age was 38 years. For every 100 females there were 113.7 males. For every 100 females age 18 and over, there were 109.5 males.

The median income for a household in the village was $48,182, and the median income for a family was $44,375. Males had a median income of $46,250 versus $22,188 for females. The per capita income for the village was $19,499. About 2.4% of families and 4.5% of the population were below the poverty line, including 8.3% of those under the age of eighteen and 7.7% of those 65 or over.
