= Orme Wilson Jr. =

American diplomat (1885–1966)

U.S. Ambassador to Haiti
- In office June 2, 1944 – August 22, 1946
- President: Franklin D. Roosevelt
- Preceded by: John Campbell White
- Succeeded by: Harold H. Tittmann, Jr.

Personal details
- Born: Marshall Orme Wilson Jr. November 13, 1885 New York City, New York, U.S.
- Died: February 13, 1966 (aged 80) Washington, D.C., U.S.
- Resting place: Woodlawn Cemetery
- Spouse: Alice Elsie Borland (m. 1910)
- Relations: Astor family
- Children: Orme
- Parent(s): Marshall Orme Wilson; Carrie Astor Wilson
- Education: Harvard University

Marshall Orme Wilson Jr. (November 13, 1885 – February 13, 1966) was an American diplomat and member of the Astor family.

== Early life ==
Wilson was born in New York City on November 13, 1885, to Marshall Orme Wilson and Caroline Schermerhorn "Carrie" Astor. He had one younger brother, Richard Thornton Wilson III, who married Florence Magee Ellsworth.

His maternal grandparents were William Backhouse Astor Jr. and Caroline Schermerhorn Astor, leader of the "Four Hundred". His paternal grandparents were Richard Thornton Wilson Sr., a banker who invested in railways following the end of the U.S. Civil War, and Melissa Clementine Johnston.

Wilson prepared at the Browning School in New York. He graduated from Harvard University in 1907.

=== Family ===
Through both sides of his family, he was related to many prominent people. On his paternal side, his aunt Grace Wilson was married to Cornelius Vanderbilt III; his uncle was Richard Thornton Wilson Jr.; another aunt Belle Wilson, was married to the Sir Michael Henry Herbert, the British Ambassador to the United States; and another aunt, Mary Wilson, was married to New York real estate heir, Ogden Goelet. Through the latter, he was a first cousin of Mary Goelet, who married the Henry Innes-Ker, 8th Duke of Roxburghe and became the Duchess of Roxburghe.

On his maternal side, his aunts were Emily Astor, who married James John Van Alen; Helen Schermerhorn Astor, who married diplomat James Roosevelt Roosevelt, half-brother of Franklin D. Roosevelt; and Charlotte Augusta Astor, who married James Coleman Drayton and George Ogilvy Haig. His only maternal uncle was John Jacob Astor IV, who married socialite Ava Lowle Willing and later, Madeleine Talmage Force. He died aboard the RMS Titanic in 1912.

== Career ==
After graduating from Harvard, Wilson traveled abroad considerably and then became a "banker and manufacturer" with an office at 14 Wall Street in New York City. In 1913, he joined the firm R. T. Wilson & Co., which was started by his grandfather and run by his uncle, Richard Thornton Wilson Jr., where the young Wilson became the New York Stock Exchange board member for the firm.

Following his service in the U.S. Army during World War I, Wilson began a long career as a diplomat with the United States Department of State. He first served in Brussels, then Bern, and in Buenos Aires, Argentina where he was second secretary and first secretary, before serving as the assistant chief of the division of Latin American affairs at the State Department.

In 1933, Wilson was made first secretary to the Embassy in Berlin. The following year, he was transferred to Prague as Consul General.

=== U.S. Ambassador to Haiti ===
On March 21, 1944, Wilson was appointed the United States Ambassador to Haiti by President Franklin D. Roosevelt. He presented his credentials on June 2, 1944 and terminated his mission by leaving his post on August 22, 1946.

While in Haiti, Wilson was a frequent writer to Cordell Hull, the U.S. Secretary of State regarding the escalation of tensions in Haiti. Wilson recommended that unless "the Department of State views with disfavor a policy which might tend to keep President Lescot in office, there would appear to be no objection to supplying the small amount of equipment contemplated by the War Department."

== Personal life ==
In 1910, Wilson was married to Alice Elsie "Ella" Borland, a Brearley School graduate. She was the daughter of John Nelson Borland and the granddaughter of George Griswold Haven. Together, they had a son Orme Wilson in 1920. He served as a Foreign Service officer who served as Consul General in Zagreb, Yugoslavia; as adviser to the United States Mission to the United Nations and as political counselor to the United States Representative to NATO, and president of the Virginia Thoroughbred Association. He married Mrs. Julie Brown Colt in 1945.

Wilson was a member of the Union Club of the City of New York, the Harvard Club of New York, the Knickerbocker Club, the University Club of New York, the Automobile Club of America and the Tuxedo Club.

Wilson died in Washington, D.C., on February 13, 1966.

Diplomatic posts
Preceded by John Campbell White	U.S. Ambassador to Haiti; 1944–1946	Succeeded by Harold H. Tittmann, Jr.
