= Robert Wilson Goelet =

American social leader, banker, and real estate developer

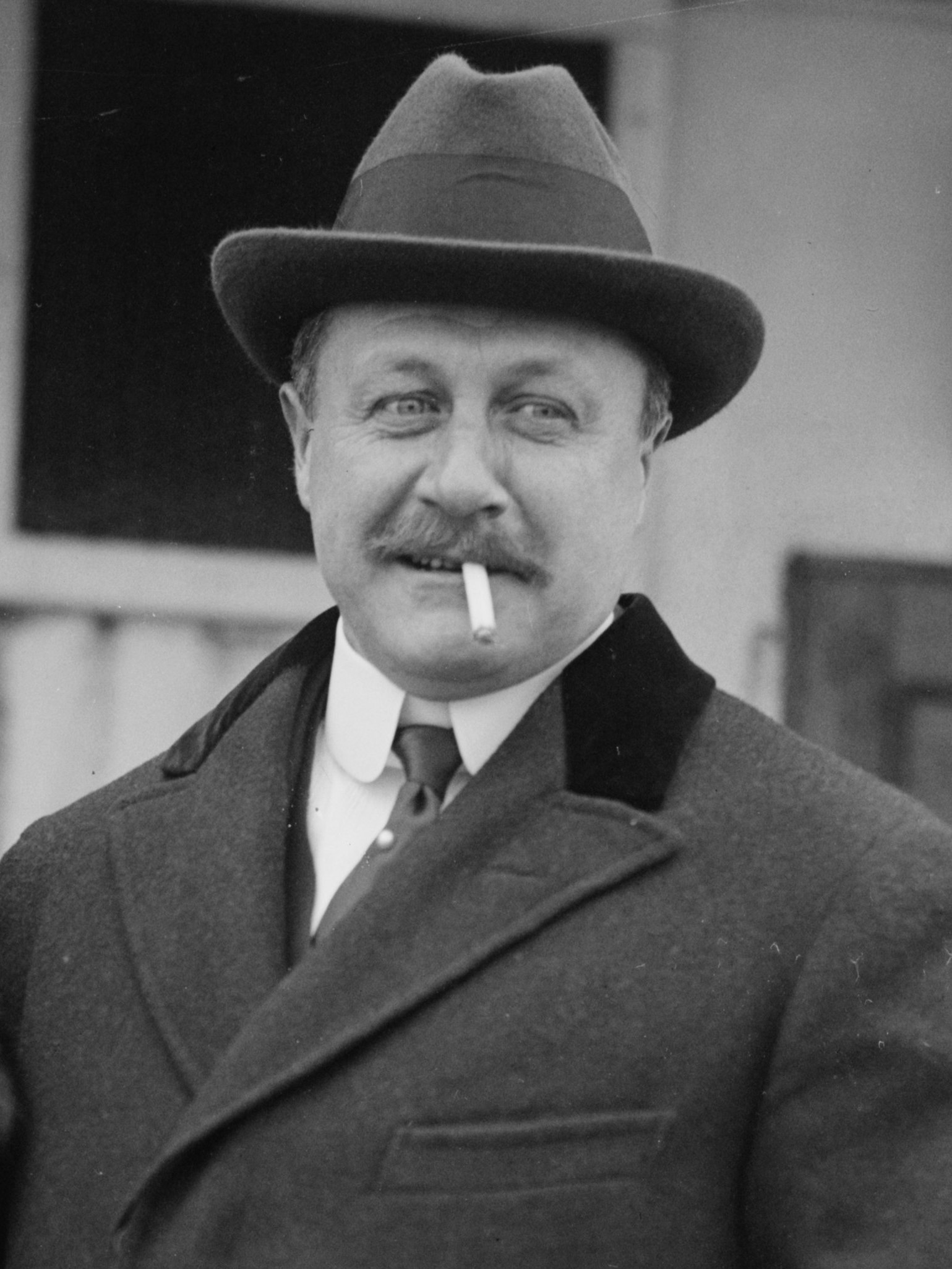
- Born: January 9, 1880; New York City, U.S.
- Died: February 16, 1966 (aged 86); New York City, U.S.
- Education: Harvard University
- Spouses: Marie Elise Whelen (m. 1904; div. 1914) Donna Fernanda Riabouchinsky (m. 1919; div. 1924) Roberta Willard (m. 1925)
- Children: 4
- Parent(s): Ogden Goelet; Mary Wilson Goelet
- Relatives: See Goelet family

Robert Wilson Goelet (January 9, 1880 – February 6, 1966) was an American social leader, banker, and real estate developer who built Glenmere mansion.

== Early life ==
Goelet was born in 1880. He was the son of Mary Wilson Goelet (1855–1929), a leader of New York and Newport society, and Ogden Goelet (1846–1897), a prominent heir and landlord in New York City who was the great-grandson of Peter Goelet, who begat the Goelet wealth by becoming one of the largest landowners in New York, which reportedly was 55 acres "stretching along the East side from Union Square to 48th Street." His only sibling was his older sister, Mary Goelet, who married Henry Innes-Ker, 8th Duke of Roxburghe in 1903. Through his sister, he was the maternal uncle of George Innes-Ker, 9th Duke of Roxburghe (1913–1974).

Through his mother, he was a nephew of Richard Thornton Wilson, Jr., Marshall Orme Wilson, Belle Wilson (the wife of British Ambassador Sir Michael Henry Herbert), and Grace Wilson (the wife of Cornelius Vanderbilt III). Through his father, he was a nephew of Robert Goelet, and a first cousin of Robert Walton Goelet.

Goelet attended Harvard University, graduating in 1902, at which time he received one million dollars (equivalent to approximately $37,211,538 in 2025 dollars) from his father's estate.

== Career ==
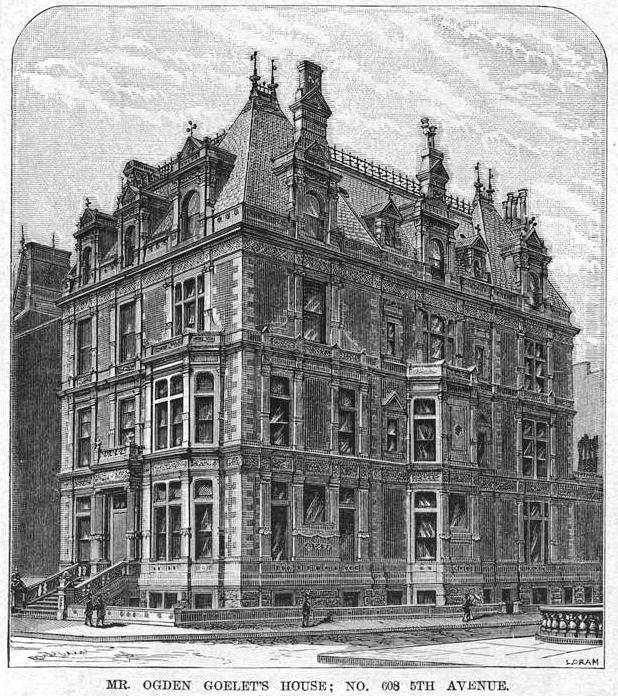
His parents' New York mansion at 608 Fifth Avenue

He became "a major force in the development of American railroads, hotels, and real estate," and served as a director of the Chemical Bank in New York, (Note: The Chemical Bank acquired Chase Manhattan Bank in 1996 and became JPMorgan Chase.) the New York Trust Company, the City Investing Company, the Fifth Avenue Corporation and the Real Estate Mortgage Commission.

After his mother's death, acknowledging the change in the neighborhood from residential to commercial, he had the family home, 608 Fifth Avenue (located on the southwest corner of 49th and Fifth) in New York City, tore down and commissioned Victor L.S. Hafner to design 608 Fifth Avenue, which stands to this day.

In 1947, he attempted to donate Ochre Court, his parents' châteauesque mansion designed by Richard Morris Hunt in Newport that was the second largest mansion in Newport after The Breakers, to the United Nations as their headquarters. They did not accept the donation and instead, Ochre Court was donated to the Sisters of Mercy for the formation of Salve Regina College, the first Catholic women's college in the state of Rhode Island.

=== Military service ===
During World War I, Goelet was a captain in the infantry in France, first with the 77th Division and later with the 82nd Division. For his service, he received the Silver Star for "gallantry" at the Battle of Meuse-Argonne.

== Personal life ==
On June 14, 1904, Goelet married Marie Elsie Whelen (1880–1959) in Philadelphia with Alice Roosevelt as one of her bridesmaids. She was the daughter of Henry Whelan Jr., a prominent banker from Philadelphia, and the sister of Laura Whelan, who was married to Craig Biddle (brother of Anthony Joseph Drexel Biddle). Before their divorce in 1914 (she later remarried to the artist Henry Clews Jr. and moved to the Chateau de la Napoule in France), they were the parents of two sons:

- Ogden Goelet (1907–1969), who married five times, the first being to Florence Enid Connfelt (1912–1992) in 1933. They divorced in 1938, and later that year, he married Maria Virginia Zimbalist (1915–1981), the daughter of singer Alma Gluck and violinist Efrem Zimbalist. They divorced in March 1941, and in April 1941, he married Mimi Nicholson Browne (1922), whom he also divorced. He later married for the fifth time to Sarah Sherborne Haigh (1908–1989) in 1963, remaining married until his death in 1969.
- Peter Goelet (1911–1986)

On October 22, 1919, he remarried to Donna Fernanda (née Rocchi), the Princess Riabouchinsky (1885–1982) at the American Church in Paris. Donna was born in Perugia, Italy and was the former wife of Prince Nicholas Riabouchinsky, a close friend of Goelet. The marriage reportedly infuriated his mother, who refused to receive his wife, and she cut him off from his share in her personal fortune, closed her New York home, her Newport home, and went to England to live. They eventually won over his mother four years later after the birth of a son, but the couple divorced in 1924 and she was later known as the Duchess de Villarosa. Donna and Robert were the parents of one son:

- Robert Wilson Goelet, Jr. (1921–1989), a film producer who first married Jane Potter Monroe in 1942. They divorced, and in 1949, he remarried to Lynn Merrick. After their marriage, his mother disinherited him. After a "stormy" marriage, they divorced in 1956.

On September 24, 1925, he married for the third time to Roberta Willard (1891–1949), the daughter of Col. Joseph Willard of Newport. Roberta had reportedly been voted "the prettiest debutante there in 1916." Both of their mothers were ill and could not attend the wedding, with her mother dying a month later, and his mother, a few years later in 1929. Together they were the parents of a daughter:

- Mary Eleanor Goelet (1927–1994) who married (and later divorced) James Eliot Cross in 1949. She later married Harold C. King.

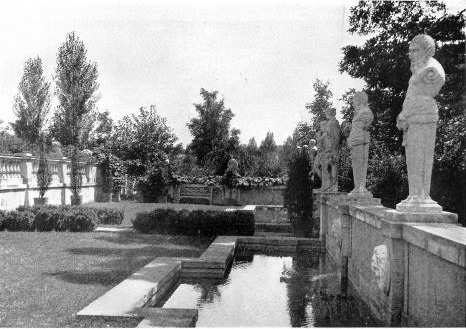
The wall pools of Glenmere's southern garden, c. 1920

Following his donation of Ochre Court in 1947, he purchased a home known as Champ Soleil, designed by Polhemus & Coffin and located at 601 Bellevue Avenue in Newport. (Note: Champ Soleil was completed in 1929 by Lucy Drexel Dahlgren was later owned by Laura Jane Barney.) He served on the boards of Bailey's Beach and the Newport Country Club, both of which were co-founded by his uncle, and which he was one of the largest shareholders. In New York, he was a member of the Knickerbocker Club, the Harvard Club, Turf Club, the St. Nicholas Society, the Piping Rock Club, and the Tuxedo Club. He also owned a plantation near Charleston, South Carolina, and was the builder of Glenmere mansion, his estate on the Hudson River built in 1911 and designed by Carrère and Hastings, where he entertained Babe Ruth and the Duke and Duchess of Windsor. Glenmere was a 62-room manor house in the style of an Italian villa set on 1,322 acres.

Goelet died at his home, 4 East 66th Street in New York City, on February 6, 1966. His funeral was held at St. Thomas’s and he was buried at Woodlawn Cemetery in the Bronx. He was worth an estimated $50,000,000 (equivalent to approximately $496,153,846 in 2025 dollars) at the time of his death. A month after his death, the Chemical Bank of New York, as executor of his estate, listed his New York apartment, which was the entire sixth floor of the building at the southeast corner of Fifth Avenue and East 66th Street, for sale for $240,000 (equivalent to approximately $2,381,538 in 2025 dollars). In October 1966, Goelet's collection of 18th century French furniture, porcelain, and other valuable objects from his New York and Newport homes were auctioned off by Parke-Bernet in New York.

=== Descendants ===
Through his eldest son Ogden, he was the grandfather of Ogden Goelet Jr. and Enid Goelet (1934–2005), who married Ranald Trask McNeil (1933–2013), a graduate of Columbia University School of Painting and Sculpture who served with the U.S. Air Force in Korea, in 1955.
