= Carrie Astor Wilson =

American heiress (1861–1948)

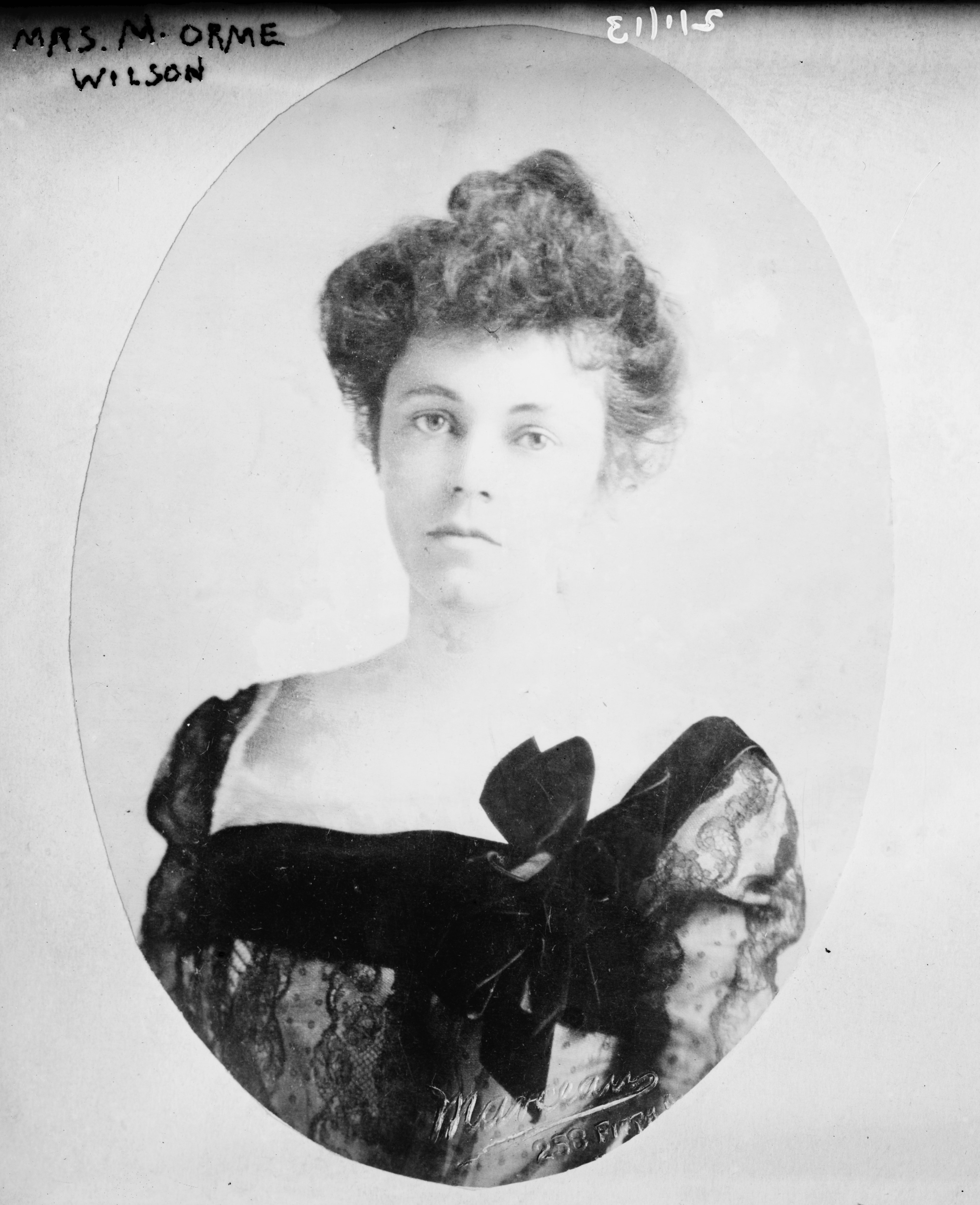
- Born: Caroline Schermerhorn Astor; October 10, 1861; New York City, New York, U.S.
- Died: September 13, 1948 (aged 86); New York City, New York, U.S.
- Burial place: Woodlawn Cemetery
- Spouse: Marshall Orme Wilson (m. 1884)
- Children: Orme Wilson Jr. Richard T. Wilson III
- Parent(s): William Backhouse Astor Jr. Caroline Schermerhorn Astor
- Relatives: Astor family; Livingston family; Van Cortlandt family

Caroline Schermerhorn Astor Wilson (October 10, 1861 – September 13, 1948) was an American heiress, social leader, and prominent member of New York society. She was a member of the Astor family, the Livingston family, and the Van Cortlandt family.

== Early life ==
Caroline Schermerhorn Astor was born in New York City on October 10, 1861, and was known as "Carrie". She was the fourth of five children born to William Backhouse Astor Jr. and Caroline Schermerhorn Astor, leader of the "Four Hundred". Her three elder sisters were Emily Astor, who married socialite James J. Van Alen; Helen Astor, who married diplomat James Roosevelt Roosevelt (the elder half-brother of future president Franklin D. Roosevelt); Charlotte Augusta Astor, who married James Coleman Drayton and then George Ogilvy Haig. She had one younger brother, Colonel John Jacob Astor IV, who died aboard the RMS Titanic in 1912.

Carrie was a descendant of many prominent Americans. Her paternal grandparents were William Backhouse Astor Sr. and Margaret (née Armstrong) Astor while her maternal grandparents were Abraham Schermerhorn and Helen Van Courtlandt (née White) Schermerhorn of the Van Cortlandt family. She was also a great-granddaughter of John Jacob Astor, America's first millionaire, wealthy merchant Peter Schemerhorn, and Continental major and U.S. Senator John Armstrong Jr. and Alida (née Livingston) Armstrong of the Livingston family. Her uncle John Jacob Astor III was the father of William Waldorf Astor, 1st Viscount Astor.

Carrie grew up at her parents' New York brownstone, 350 Fifth Avenue, at the southwest corner of Fifth Avenue and 34th Street, known for its ballroom.

== Society life ==
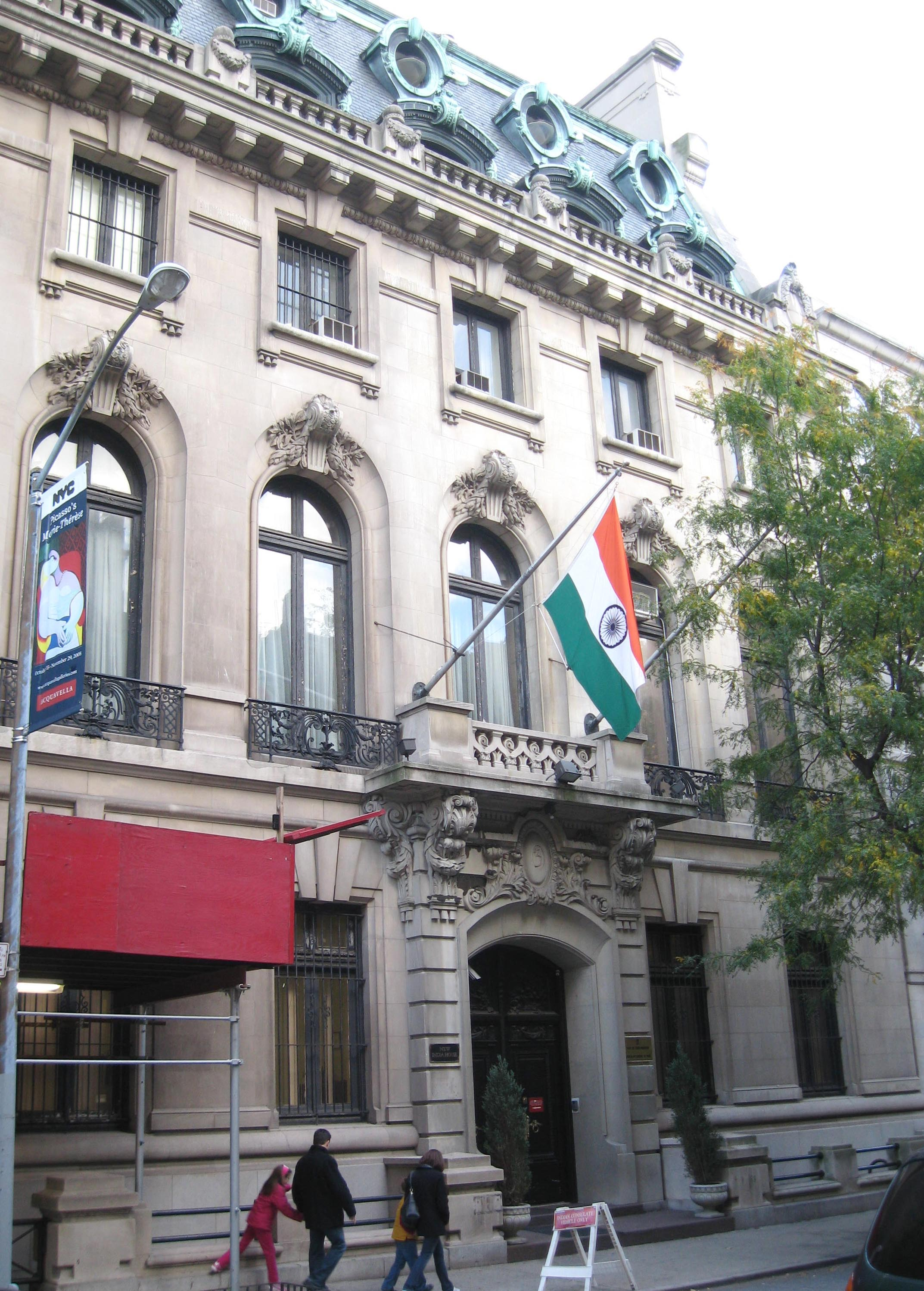
The Wilsons' residence at 3 East 64th Street.

In 1883, wealthy socialite Alva Vanderbilt, the then-wife of railroad tycoon William Kissam Vanderbilt, planned an elaborate masquerade ball for 1,000 guests (reportedly costing $3 million) to celebrate the opening of her new home at 660 Fifth Avenue, known as the William K. Vanderbilt House. The ball was to feature entertainment given by young society figures, including a dance in which young Carrie was to participate. However, at the last minute, Carrie learned that she was not invited, because Carrie's mother, Caroline Schermerhorn Astor – the Mrs. Astor and the undisputed head of New York society – had never formally "called upon" Alva. In order to appease Carrie and allow her to attend the ball, Mrs. Astor proceeded to send her calling card to the Vanderbilts' residence prior to Alva's lavish ball. Alva then extended an invitation to the Astors, and they attended the ball. Reciprocally, Mrs. Astor invited the Vanderbilts to her annual ball, which was considered a formal acknowledgement of the Vanderbilts' full acceptance into the highest echelon of New York society.

After her 1884 marriage, Carrie became a noted society hostess in her own right. Despite her family's initial reluctance at the marriage, her father purchased them a new home at 414 Fifth Avenue (not far from her parents at 350 Fifth) as a wedding present, which was furnished by Wilson's father.

For many years, Carrie and her sister-in-law, Grace Vanderbilt, shared Box 3 at the Metropolitan Opera House, "alternating as hostess on opening night."

=== Move uptown ===
After her mother's fallout with Carrie's cousin William Waldorf Astor over the use of the name "Mrs. Astor", which led to the construction of the opulent Waldorf Hotel next to her mother's residence, Mrs. Astor decamped from 34th Street and tore down Carrie's childhood home to build the larger and even more grand Astor Hotel. Her mother also built a new Astor residence uptown, at the northeast corner of Fifth and East 65th Street, for Mrs. Astor and Carrie's brother, John Jacob Astor IV, at 841 and 840 Fifth Avenue and designed by society architect Richard Morris Hunt. At the inaugural ball at her mother's new residence on February 3, 1896, Carrie led the cotillion in the new ballroom while her brother's wife (the former Ava Lowle Willing) led the cotillion from the other side.

The feud with Carrie's cousin extended to Carrie as well and led her husband to hire Warren and Wetmore to design an uptown residence for the couple on East 64th Street. Wilson bought the property in 1896, began construction in 1900, and the six-story limestone mansion with forty rooms was completed in 1903. Carrie's house was around the corner from her mother and located at the northeast corner of Fifth and East 65th Street. The sixty-five feet wide residence had a Beaux Arts facade of Indiana Limestone and a mansard roof of blue slate and featured five bays and featured a circular atrium. On January 21, 1904, Carrie hosted the first large party in their new house, which featured a performance by opera singers Mme. Lillian Nordica and Enrico Caruso.

A member of the Colony Club, Carrie served as the vice-president of the New York Women's League for Animals and was a director of the Beekman Street Hospital. She donated to the Merchant Marine Library Service.

== Personal life ==
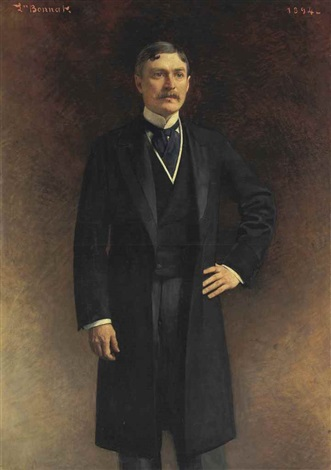
Portrait of Carrie's husband Orme, by Léon Bonnat, 1894

In the early 1880s, Carrie met and fell in love with Marshall Orme Wilson (1860–1926), although her family disapproved of him and his family. He was the eldest son of Richard Thornton Wilson, a banker from Loudon, Tennessee who had served the Commissary-General of the Confederacy and became rich investing in railways (leading to claims of war profiteering). Wilson and his siblings were known in New York and Newport society as the "Marrying Wilsons" due to their marriages into the wealthiest and most prominent families. His sister Grace married Cornelius Vanderbilt III, and his brother, Richard Jr. was married to Marion Steedman Mason, granddaughter of Rear Admiral Charles Steedman of Charleston, South Carolina, and great-granddaughter of the U.S. Senator of New Hampshire, Jeremiah Mason. Another sister, Belle, was married to British aristocrat and diplomat the Hon. Michael Henry Herbert. Wilson's eldest sister Mary married New York real estate heir Ogden Goelet, and was the mother of Mary Goelet, who later married Henry Innes-Ker, 8th Duke of Roxburghe in 1903.

Reportedly, Carrie "starved herself into bulimia until her mother gave in and agreed to the marriage." On November 18, 1884, Carrie was married to Wilson at the Astor mansion. Together, Orme and Carrie had two sons:

- Marshall Orme Wilson Jr. (1885–1966), who was appointed U.S. Ambassador to Haiti by President Franklin D. Roosevelt in 1944.
- Richard Thornton Wilson III (1886–1977), who married Harriet Appleton Post (1894–1969), a granddaughter of George B. Post, in 1923. They divorced and he later became the third husband of Florence Magee Ellsworth (1902–1943) in 1942. Harriet married Sumner Welles in 1952.

Her husband died on April 1, 1926, in New York City, and he was buried at Woodlawn Cemetery in the Bronx. In his will, Carrie received their residence and all of its belongings, and their sons inherited the residual estate, including funds left by their paternal grandfather in trust for them.

Carrie lived another twenty-two years and died on September 13, 1948, at the home of her son Richard, 1 Sutton Place (the former home of Anne Harriman Vanderbilt). She was the last surviving child of her parents. After a funeral at Trinity Church, she was buried alongside her husband at Woodlawn Cemetery. After her death, her former home was sold to the Indian Government to house their diplomats in New York for $500,000.

== In popular culture ==
In the HBO series The Gilded Age, Carrie is a recurring character portrayed by actress Amy Forsyth.

== See also ==
- Marshall Orme Wilson House
