= Marshall Orme Wilson House =

Historic house in Manhattan, New York

Coordinates: 40°46′02″N 73°58′12″W

New India House

The Marshall Orme Wilson House is a mansion at 3 East 64th Street on the Upper East Side of Manhattan in New York City. It is part of the Upper East Side Historic District, designated by the New York City Landmarks Preservation Commission in 1981.

== History ==
In 1900, Marshall Orme Wilson hired the architectural firm of Warren and Wetmore to design a private residence for his himself and his wife, Carrie Astor Wilson, the youngest daughter of William Backhouse Astor Jr. and Caroline Webster Schermerhorn Astor, "The Mrs. Astor of the 400". Construction of the Wilson house was completed in 1903.

The house was in close proximity to the other Astor family residences, including the twin home of Carrie's mother Mrs. Astor and Carrie's brother, John Jacob Astor IV (and his wife, the former Ava Lowle Willing), which was around the corner on the northeast corner of Fifth and 65th (at 841 and 840 Fifth Avenue) in a mansion designed by Richard Morris Hunt. The Wilson's son, Orme Wilson Jr., lived down the street at 11 East 64th Street.

Carrie died on September 13, 1948, at the age of 87. Three months later, on December 12, the New York Times reported that "The big town house of the late Mrs. Orme Wilson at 3 East 64th Street has been purchased by the Government of India as headquarters for its diplomatic representatives in New York." After it was bought by the Government of India, it came to be known as New India House and, in 1952, interior alterations occurred, designed by William Lescaze. The building is currently the seat of the Consulate General of India.

== Architecture ==
The Beaux-Arts street facade is constructed of Indiana Limestone with a mansard roof of blue slate. The design is in the manner of Percier and Fontaine, who revived the French Renaissance style of Hardouin Mansart. The structure is five stories tall, sixty-five feet wide consisting of five bays. One of the most engaging features of the house is the circular atrium. Rustication, carving and a balcony emphasize the central segmental-arch entrance.

The first floor has square-headed windows with splayed keystones; cornice between first and second floors; stone balcony on monumental brackets in front of central window of second floor; round-arched second floor windows set within concave round-arched recesses with unusual foliate keystones; square-headed windows of third floor have keystones with smooth enframement and stylized sill corbels; stone band at impost level; modillioned roof cornice with handsome balustrades; two-story slate mansard roof pierced by segmental dormers above which are bulls-eye dormers.
