= Marshall Orme Wilson =

American banker (1860–1926)

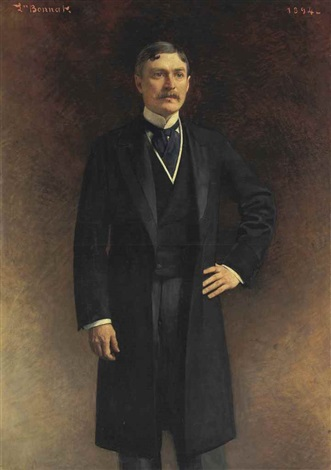
- 1894 Portrait of Wilson by Léon Bonnat
- Born: June 20, 1860; Nashville, Tennessee, U.S.
- Died: April 1, 1926 (aged 65); New York City, U.S.
- Burial place: Woodlawn Cemetery
- Education: Columbia University
- Occupation: banker
- Spouse: Caroline Schermerhorn Astor (m. 1884)
- Children: Marshall Orme Wilson Jr. Richard Thornton Wilson III
- Parent(s): Richard Thornton Wilson Sr. Melissa Clementine Johnston

Marshall Orme Wilson (June 20, 1860 – April 1, 1926) was an American banker and prominent member of New York Society during the Gilded Age.

== Early life ==
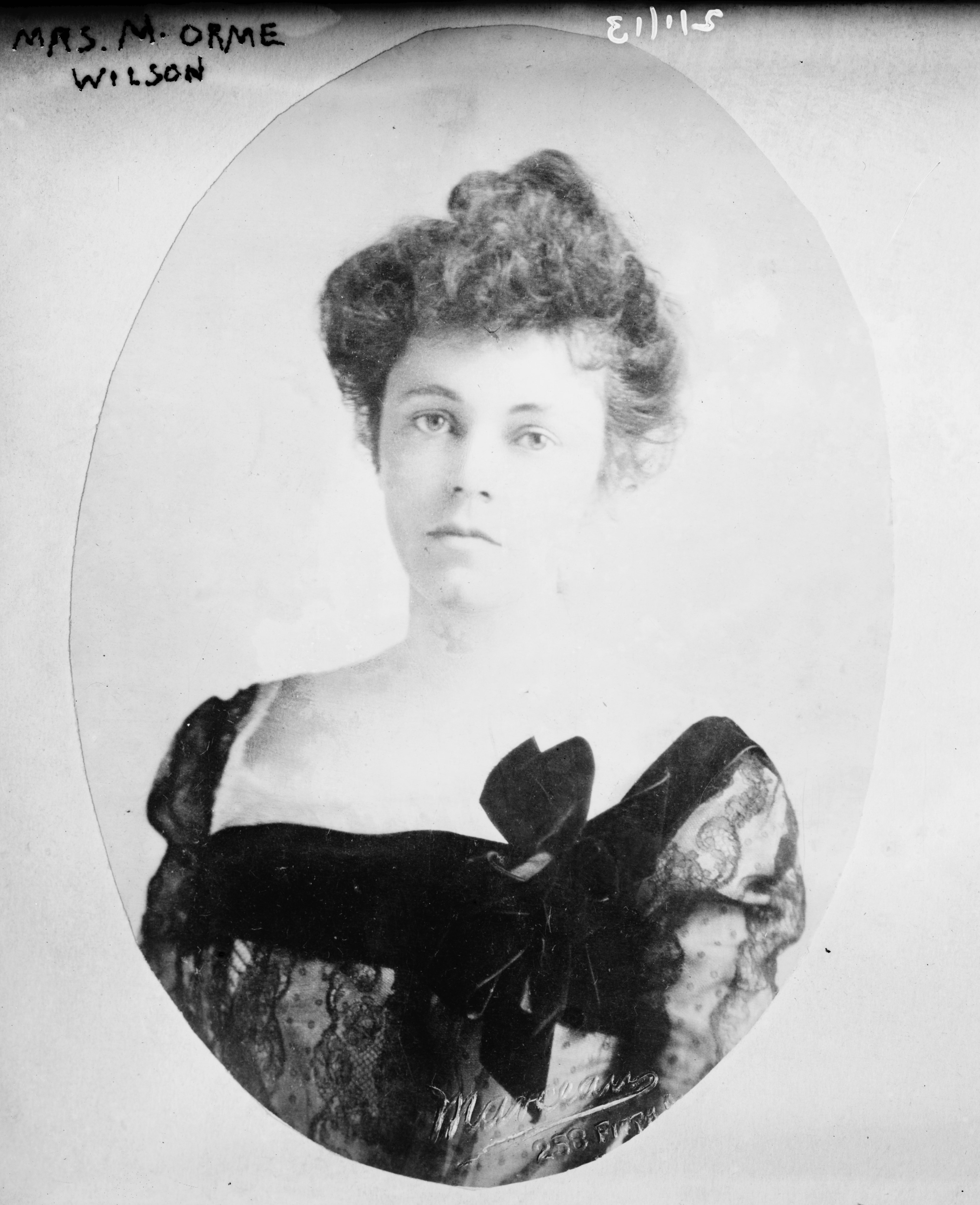
Photograph of Wilson's wife, Caroline Schermerhorn Astor, from the Library of Congress

Wilson was born in Nashville, Tennessee, on June 20, 1860. He was the eldest surviving son born to Richard Thornton Wilson Sr. and Melissa Clementine Johnston. His father was a multimillionaire investment banker originally from Loudon, Tennessee, who served on the staff of Lucius B. Northrop, the Commissary-General of the Confederate States of America and invested in railways following the end of the War. His parents resided at 511 Fifth Avenue, the former home of Boss Tweed.

Because of Wilson and his siblings' many advantageous marriages, the Wilsons were known in New York and Newport society as the "Marrying Wilsons." His sister Grace Graham Wilson married Cornelius "Neily" Vanderbilt III of the Vanderbilt family. (Note: Neily's sister Gertrude was married to prominent horseman Harry Payne Whitney.) His brother, Richard Thornton Wilson Jr., was married to Marion Steedman Mason (1875–1947). Wilson's sister Belle Wilson was married to the Honourable Sir Michael Henry Herbert, the British Ambassador to the United States during Theodore Roosevelt's administration, and the brother of the Earl of Pembroke. Finally, his sister Mary Wilson was married to New York real estate heir Ogden Goelet; they were the parents of Mary Goelet, who married the Duke of Roxburghe.

== Career ==
In 1882, Wilson graduated from Columbia University. Upon his graduation, he joined his father's firm, R. T. Wilson & Co. as a banker.

Along with his wife, a daughter of New York Society leader Caroline Schermerhorn Astor, Wilson was considered a social leader in both New York and Newport, Rhode Island. He was a member of the Knickerbocker Club, the Church, and the Automobile of America. In 1894, Wilson was painted by Léon Bonnat, in a work now owned by the Metropolitan Museum of Art.

== Personal life ==
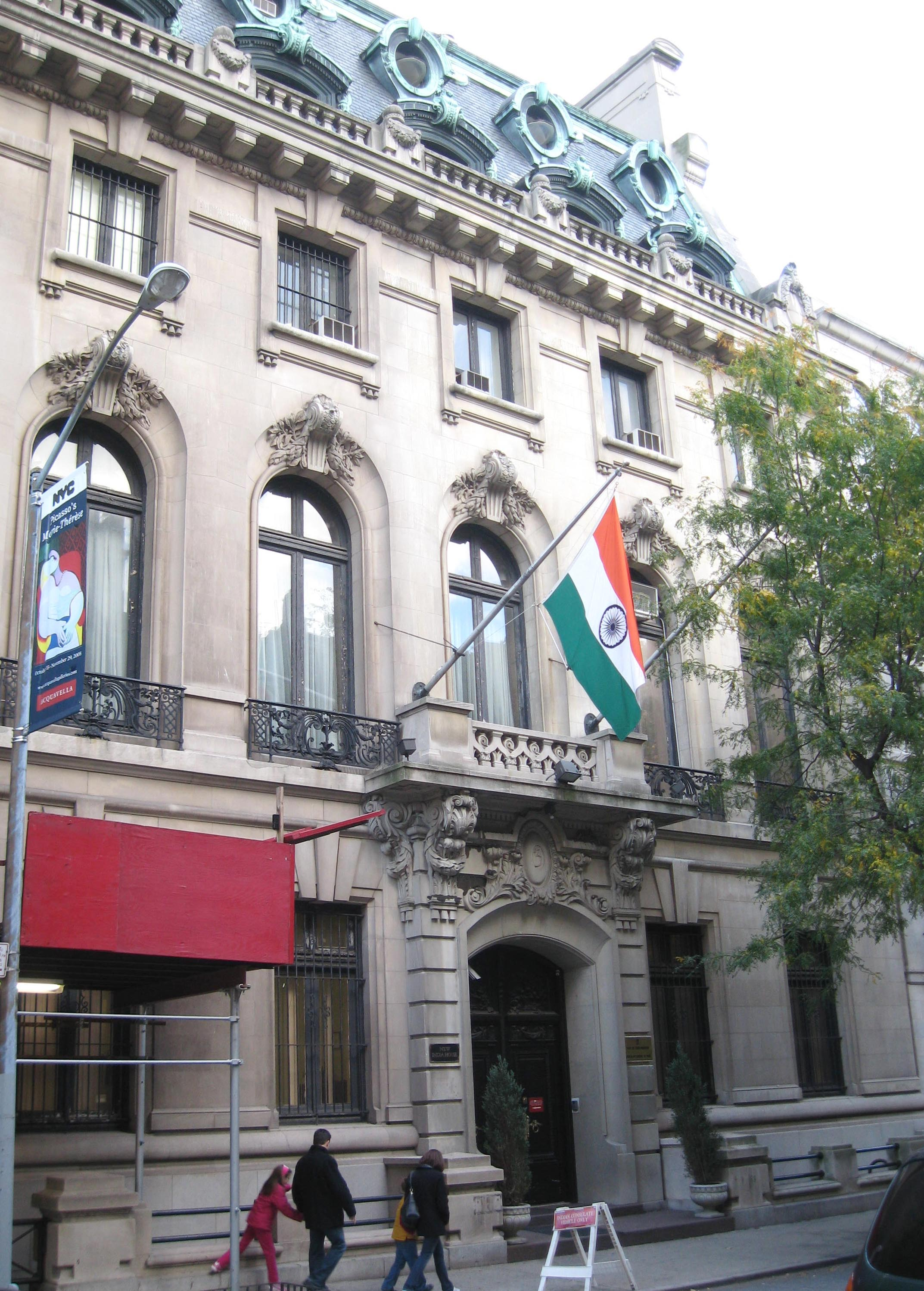
The Wilson's residence at 3 East 64th Street

In the early 1880s, Wilson met and fell in love with Caroline Schermerhorn "Carrie" Astor and they endeavored to marry. As he was a son of a Southerner and Civil War profiteer, the Astors disapproved of the prospect. Reportedly, Carrie "starved herself into bulimia until her mother gave in and agreed to the marriage."

On November 18, 1884, the couple wed at the Astor mansion. Carrie, a great-granddaughter of John Jacob Astor, was the youngest daughter of William Backhouse Astor Jr. and Caroline Webster Schermerhorn, leader of the 400. Among her siblings was brother Colonel John Jacob Astor IV, who died aboard the RMS Titanic. Together, Orme and Carrie had two sons: Marshall Orme Wilson Jr., born in 1885, and later appointed United States Ambassador to Haiti by President Franklin D. Roosevelt in 1944; and Richard Thornton Wilson III, born in 1886.

Wilson died on April 1, 1926, in New York City. His funeral service was held at the Trinity Chapel on 25th Street, and was officiated by Bishop William T. Manning. The choir of Trinity Church sang the hymn "Nearer, My God, to Thee." He was buried at Woodlawn Cemetery in the Bronx. In his will, his wife received their residence and all of its belongings, and his sons inherited the residual estate, including the funds left by his father in trust for his sons, thereby avoiding Federal or State inheritance tax on the principal.

=== Residences ===
After his marriage to Carrie, the couple moved into a new home at 414 Fifth Avenue purchased by her father for them as a wedding present and furnished by his father.

Following his mother-in-law and brother-in-law's feud with Carrie's cousin William Waldorf Astor, (Note: The feud originated with the use of the phrase Mrs. Astor and led William Waldorf Astor and John Jacob Astor IV) Wilson hired the architectural firm of Warren and Wetmore to design a residence on East 64th Street. The house, which began construction in 1900 was completed in 1903, was in close proximity of other Astor family residences, including Mrs. Astor's home designed by Richard Morris Hunt around the corner on the northeast corner of Fifth Avenue and 65th Street. The residence had a Beaux Arts facade of Indiana Limestone and a mansard roof of blue slate and is five stories tall, sixty-five feet wide consisting of five bays, and featured a circular atrium.
