= Mary Wilson Goelet =

American socialite

- Born: Mary Rita Wilson; December 4, 1855; Loudon, Tennessee, U.S.
- Died: February 23, 1929 (aged 73); New York City, U.S.
- Spouse: Ogden Goelet (m. 1877; died 1897)
- Children: Mary Goelet; Robert Wilson Goelet
- Parent(s): Richard Thornton Wilson; Melissa Clementine Johnston
- Relatives: Richard Wilson Jr. (brother); Grace Vanderbilt (sister); George Innes-Ker, 9th Duke of Roxburghe (grandson)

Mary Rita Goelet (née Wilson; December 12, 1855 – February 23, 1929), known as May Goelet, was an American socialite and member of a family known as "the marrying Wilsons".

== Early life ==
May was born on December 12, 1855, in Loudon, Tennessee. She was the oldest surviving child born to Richard Thornton Wilson and Melissa Clementine (née Johnston) Wilson. Her father, who has been referred to as a "war profiteer" for his actions during and following the Civil War, moved the family north after the War and became a prominent New York banker.

May and her siblings were known in society as "the marrying Wilsons" due to their marriages to the wealthiest and most prominent families of the day.

Among her siblings was sister Belle, who married Sir Michael Henry Herbert, the younger brother of the 13th Earl of Pembroke, and youngest sister, Grace, who became the wife of Cornelius Vanderbilt III. Her brothers were banker Richard Thornton Wilson Jr., who married Marion Steedman Mason; and Marshall Orme Wilson, who married Carrie Astor, youngest daughter of William Astor and Caroline Webster Astor (known as "The Mrs. Astor" of the Astor family).

== Society life ==
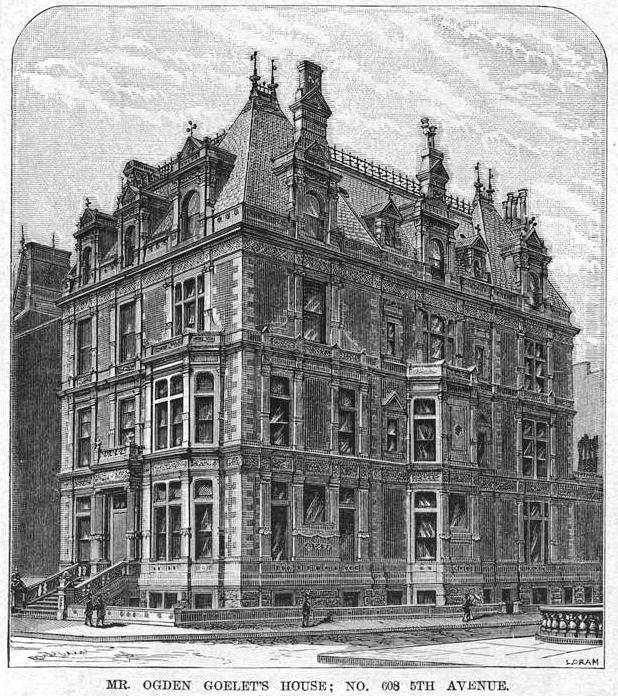
The Goelet's New York mansion, 608 Fifth Avenue.

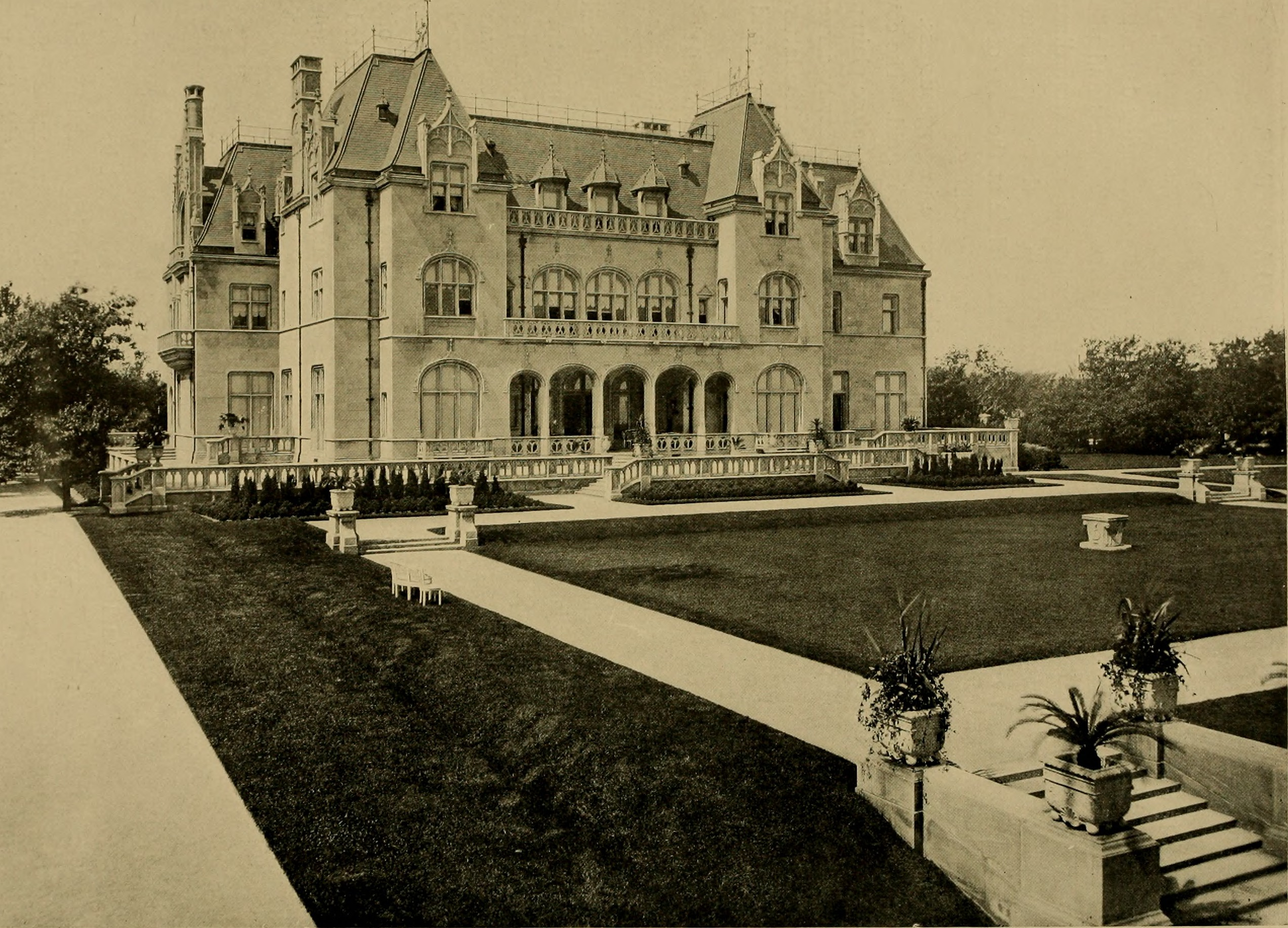
The Goelet's Newport residence, Ochre Court, in 1904.

In 1892, May and Ogden were included in Ward McAllister's Four Hundred, purported to be an index of New York's best families, published in The New York Times. Conveniently, 400 was the number of people that could fit into Mrs. Astor's ballroom. May was known as one of the viceregal leaders of the Ultra-fashionable 150, among Mrs. Astor, Mrs. Ogden Mills, Mrs. John Jacob Astor, and Mrs. Cornelius Vanderbilt Jr.

=== Residences ===
May and Ogden owned a townhouse at 608 Fifth Avenue (located on the southwest corner of 49th and Fifth) in New York City, around the corner from a second house at 4 West 49th Street. The family's stables were at 7 East 52nd Street. The Goelets also had a villa in Nice, France, and when in London, they resided at Wimbourne House. After her death, her son, acknowledging the change in the neighborhood from residential to commercial, tore down the family home in New York City and commissioned Victor L. S. Hafner to design 608 Fifth Avenue.

In 1892, the Goelet's commissioned Ochre Court, a châteauesque mansion in Newport, Rhode Island. The home was built at a cost of $4.5 million and was the second largest mansion in Newport after nearby The Breakers, both designed by architect Richard Morris Hunt. In 1947, her son donated Ochre Court to the Sisters of Mercy for the formation of Salve Regina College.

== Personal life ==
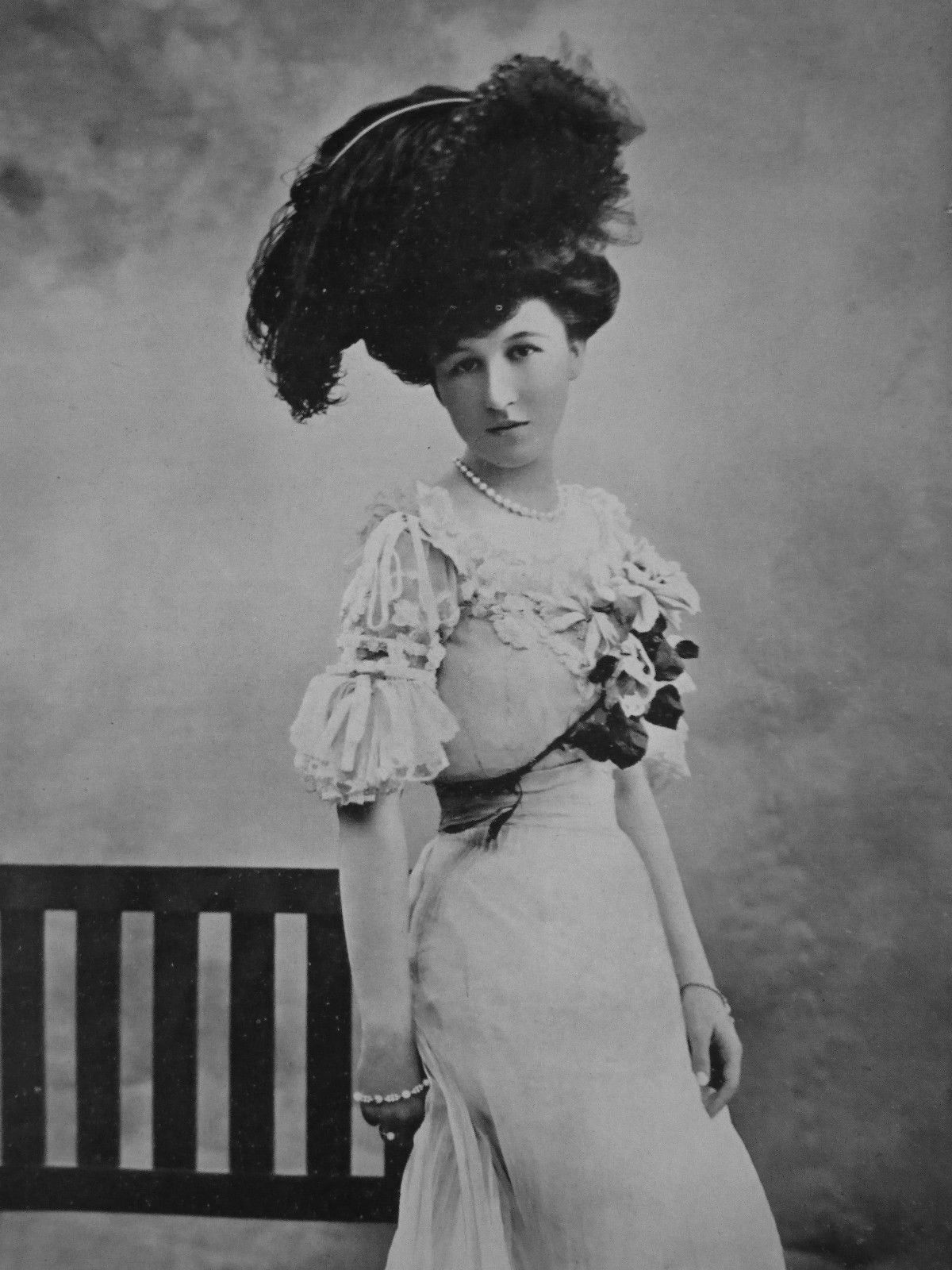
May's daughter, Mary, Duchess of Roxburghe, shortly after her marriage to the 8th Duke of Roxburghe in 1903.

In 1877, May married Ogden Goelet (1846–1897). Ogden was the son of Sarah (née Ogden) Goelet and Robert Goelet, both of whom were from prominent New York families and among the wealthiest in America due to their vast real estate holdings. Ogden and his older brother Robert (himself the father of Robert Walton Goelet) were real estate developer who managed the estate of their father and uncle. Together, they were the parents of two children:

- Mary Goelet (1878–1937), who married Henry Innes-Ker, 8th Duke of Roxburghe (1876–1932), in 1903. Henry, a first cousin of Prime Minister Winston Churchill, was the son of the late 7th Duke of Roxburghe and Lady Anne Spencer-Churchill, daughter of the Duke of Marlborough and his wife Lady Frances Vane.
- Robert Wilson Goelet (1880–1966), who built Glenmere mansion. In 1904, he married Marie Elise Whelen (1880–1949). They divorced in 1914 (she remarried to Henry Clews Jr.) and he married Donna Fernanda (née di Villa Rosa) Riabouchinsky (1885–1982) in 1919. They divorced in 1924 he married for the third time to Roberta Willard (1891–1949) in 1925.

May's husband died in 1897 aboard his yacht in the town of Cowes in the Isle of Wight after over five years spent abroad. In his will, he left his entire estate to his May and their two children. She was buried at Woodlawn Cemetery in the Bronx alongside her husband. She lived for another 32 years until her death in New York City on February 23, 1929. After her death, her daughter inherited $3,000,000 from the Goelet estate.

=== Descendants ===
Through her daughter's marriage to the Duke of Roxburghe, she was the grandmother of George Innes-Ker, 9th Duke of Roxburghe (1913–1974), who succeeded his father's Dukedom in 1932. In 1935, he married Lady Mary Evelyn Hungerford Crewe-Milnes, the daughter of the Marquess of Crewe. The childless marriage ended in divorce in 1953, and in 1954, he remarried to Margaret Elizabeth McConnel, with whom he had two children, Guy Innes-Ker, 10th Duke of Roxburghe (b. 1954), and Lord Robert Anthony Innes-Ker (b. 1959).

Through her son Robert, she was the grandmother of four grandchildren, including Ogden Goelet (1907–1969), who married three times; Peter Goelet (1911–1986); Robert Wilson Goelet Jr. (1921–1989), who married twice, Jane Potter Monroe (they divorced), and Lynn Merrick in 1949 (they divorced in 1956); Mary Eleanor Goelet (b. 1927) who married (and later divorced) James Eliot Cross in 1949.
