= Richard Thornton Wilson =

American investment banker

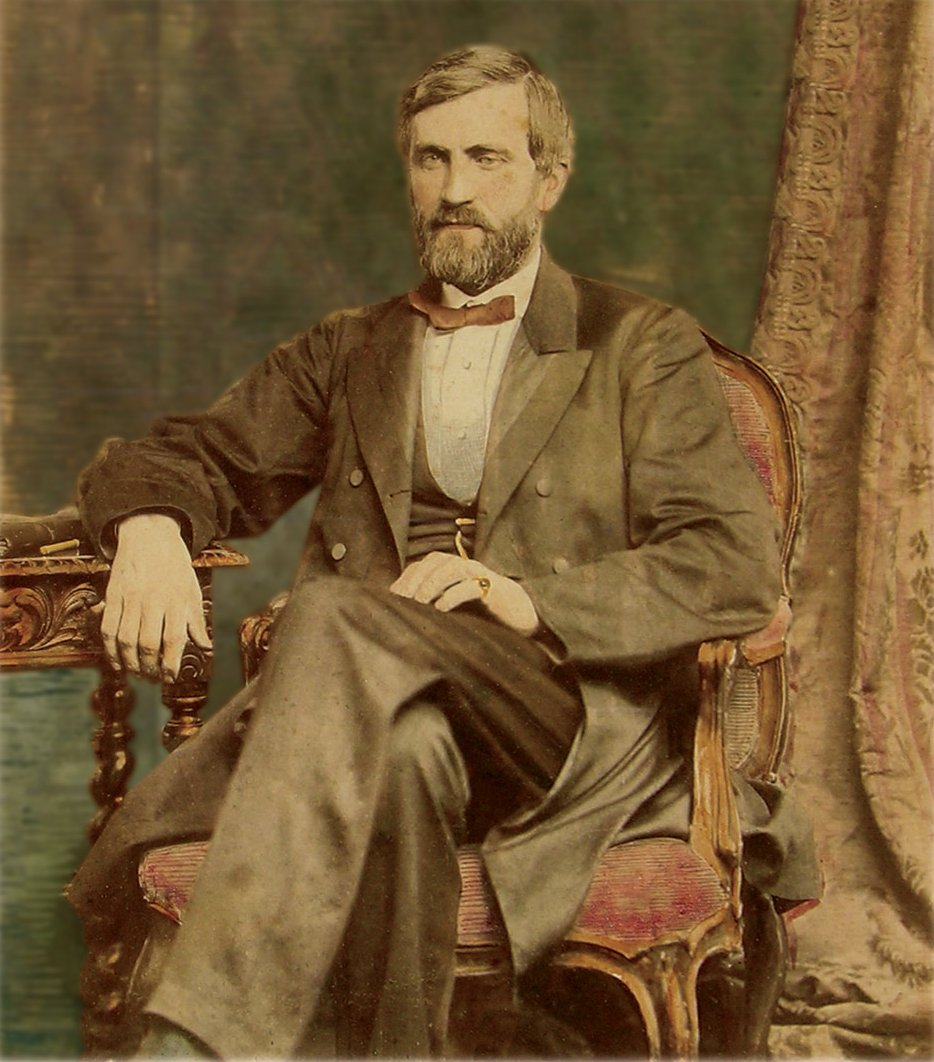
- Born: c. 1829; Habersham Co., Georgia, U.S.
- Died: November 26, 1910 (aged 80–81); New York City, New York, U.S.
- Burial place: Woodlawn Cemetery, The Bronx, New York
- Occupation: Banker
- Spouse: Melissa Clementine Johnston
- Children: 5, including Marshall, Richard Jr. and Grace
- Parent(s): William and Rachel Wilson

Richard Thornton Wilson (c. 1829 – November 26, 1910) was a multimillionaire American investment banker known for being the father of five children who all married into prominent families during the Gilded Age of New York.

== Early life ==
Wilson was born in Habersham County, Georgia in about 1829, to William Wilson (d. 1849), a Scottish tanner and shoemaker, and Rachel Wilson (1797–1870).

== Career ==
After the death of his father in 1849, he needed to find employment, so he went to Dalton, Georgia and began working as a clerk in a store owned by Levi Brotherton, a Methodist clergyman and missionary. After saving his money, he started a "general merchandise" business with W. R. High, taking his business on the road. He would buy items in Atlanta and then sell them or trade them for cotton. During this period, he met the Orme brothers, who both worked for the East Tennessee and Georgia Railroad.

After heading towards Knoxville, Tennessee, and finding himself exhausted in Loudon, Tennessee, he slept on the doorstep of the town's mercantile store, owned by Ebenezer Johnston. Johnston, a South Carolina native, owned 712 acres of farmland, a large manor house and slave quarters. After Johnston saw Wilson's work, he agreed allow Wilson to marry his daughter in 1852 and to finance business ventures for Wilson. They stayed in Loudon until late 1860, when he moved his growing family to Nashville, Tennessee.

=== Civil War ===
During the American Civil War, the family moved to Macon, Georgia and Wilson served on the staff of Lucius B. Northrop, the Commissary-General of the Confederate States of America. Later Wilson was appointed Commissary General by Jefferson Davis, and in this capacity, he was sent to London by the Confederate Government to dispose of the cotton crop. At the end of the war, he was said to have come out of it $500,000 richer.

=== Post–Civil War ===
After the war ended, Wilson began buying up defunct railroads. He moved to New York City and purchased a mansion at 511 5th Avenue that was the former home of Boss Tweed. The Wilsons lived in New York, spending summers at their cottage, "Bienveno," in Newport, Rhode Island, for the remainder of their lives.

Richard opened the banking firm of Wilson Galloway & Co., which would later become R. T. Wilson & Co., the company first to take up the question of the New York Subway System. Wilson served as a director of the American Cotton Oil Co., the Fourth National Bank, the Manhattan Trust Co., Castner Electrolytic Alkali Co., the National Surety Co., Union Trust Co., the United States Casualty Co. and the Mathheson Alkali Works. He retired from business around 1906.

== Personal life ==
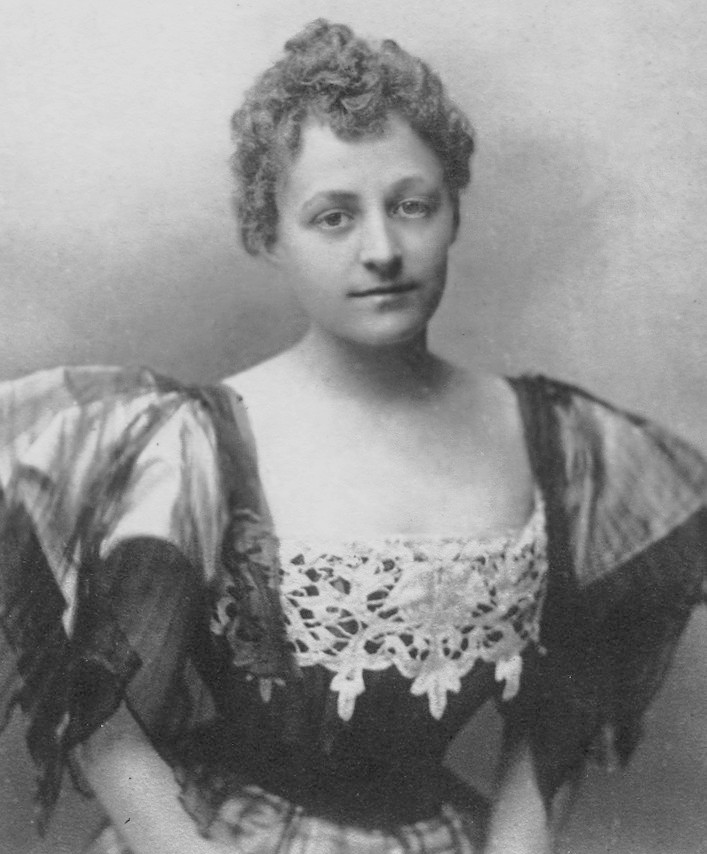
Wilson's youngest daughter, Grace Wilson Vanderbilt (1870–1953)

On December 23, 1852, he married Melissa Clementine Johnston (1831–1908), the eldest daughter of Ebenezer Johnston. Together, they were the parents of five children. Through his wife's connections, she was able to enter and become intimate with "old New York society". Because of their children's advantageous marriages, the Wilsons were known in New York and Newport society as the "marrying Wilsons."

- Mary Rita "May" Wilson (1855–1929), who married Ogden Goelet (1851–1897) in 1878
- Marshall Orme Wilson (1860–1926), who married Caroline Schermerhorn "Carrie" Astor (1861–1948), daughter of William Backhouse Astor Jr. and Caroline Webster Schermerhorn, and a sister of Colonel John Jacob Astor IV, the richest passenger on the RMS Titanic
- Leila "Belle" Wilson (1864–1923), who married Sir Michael Henry Herbert (1857–1903) in 1888, the British ambassador to the United States during Theodore Roosevelt's administration, and the brother of the 13th and 14th Earls of Pembroke
- Richard Thornton Wilson Jr. (1866–1929), who married Marion Steedman Mason in 1902, granddaughter of Rear Admiral Charles Steedman of Charleston, South Carolina, and great-granddaughter of U.S. Senator of New Hampshire, Jeremiah Mason.
- Grace Graham Wilson (1870–1953), who married Cornelius Vanderbilt III (1873–1942) in 1896, despite his father's wishes. Vanderbilt's sister, Gertrude, was married to Harry Payne Whitney.

Wilson was a member of the Chamber of Commerce, the Union Club, Manhattan Club, Metropolitan Club, and Downtown Club, the Southern Society, the Metropolitan Museum of Art and the American Museum of Natural History.

Wilson died on November 26, 1910, aged 80, at his residence, 511 Fifth Avenue, in New York City. His estate totaled $16,072,470 at his death, of which $2,216,083 was real estate. His Newport residence, 97 Narragansett Avenue, was not valued in the appraisal. According to the terms of his will, his estate was divided among his children and grandchildren, with no bequests made to charity.

=== Descendants ===
Wilson was the grandfather of many prominent people, including Mary, Duchess of Roxburghe (1878–1937), who married the Henry Innes-Ker, 8th Duke of Roxburghe (1876–1932) in 1903, Marshall Orme Wilson Jr. (1885–1966), Richard Thornton Wilson III (1886–1977), Sir Sidney Herbert, 1st Baronet and Member of Parliament (1890–1939), Lt. Michael George Herbert (1893–1932), Louisa Steedman Wilson (1904–1974), Marion Mason Wilson (1906–1982), Cornelius Vanderbilt IV (1898–1974), and Grace Vanderbilt (1899–1964).
