= William Backhouse Astor =

William Backhouse Astor may refer to:

- William Backhouse Astor, Sr. (1792–1875), American businessman and member of the Astor family
- William Backhouse Astor, Jr. (1829–1892), American businessman and son of the above
