= Michael Henry Herbert =

British diplomat and ambassador

The Right Honourable Sir Michael Henry Herbert KCMG CB
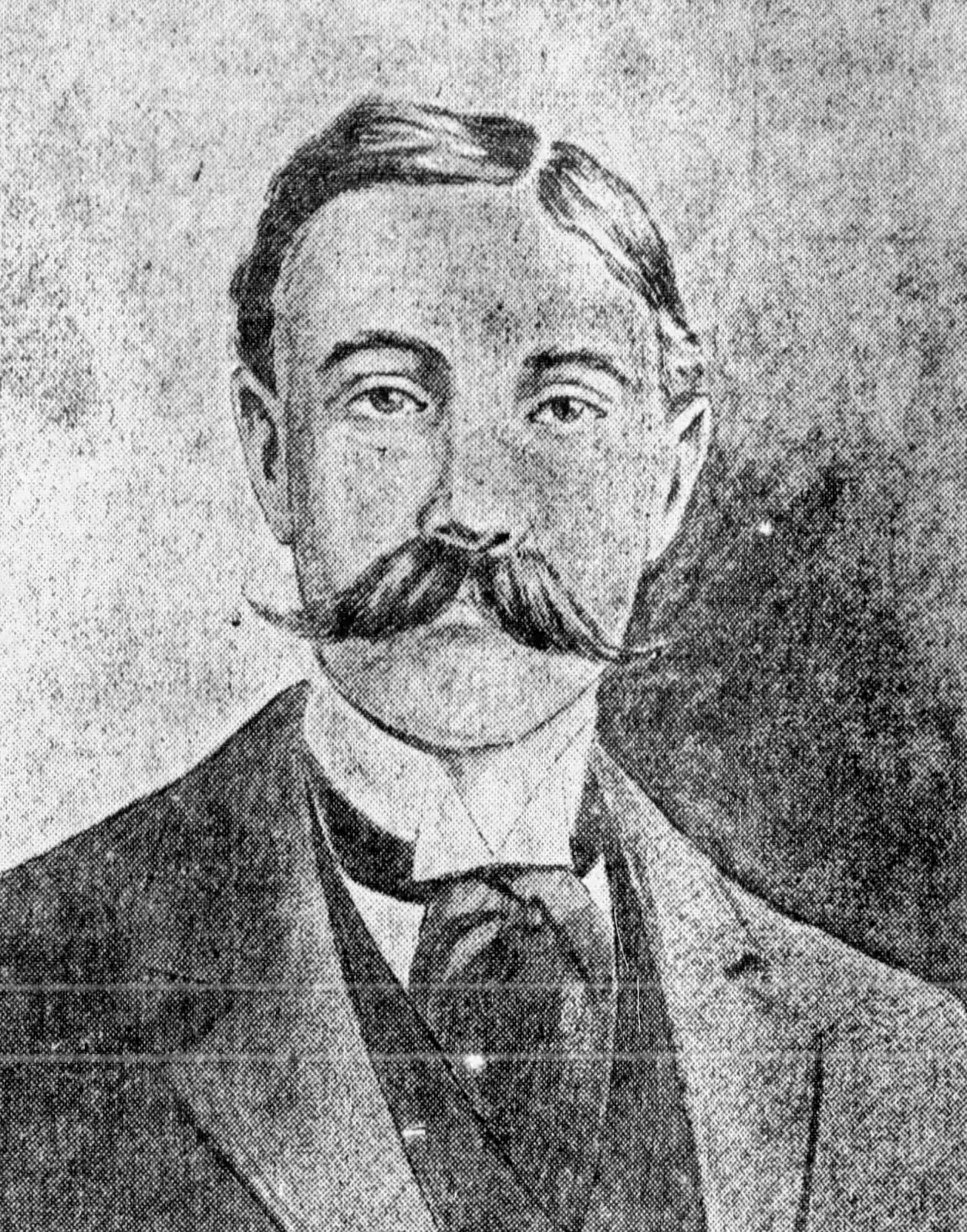
- Herbert circa 1903

British Ambassador to the United States
- In office 1902–1903
- Monarch: Edward VII
- Prime Minister: The Marquess of Salisbury; Arthur Balfour
- Preceded by: The Lord Pauncefote
- Succeeded by: Sir Mortimer Durand

Personal details
- Born: 25 June 1857
- Died: 30 September 1903 (aged 46) Davos, Switzerland
- Spouse: Leila Wilson (m. 1888)
- Children: 2 sons
- Parent(s): Sidney Herbert, 1st Baron Herbert of Lea; Elizabeth à Court-Repington
- Relatives: 13th Earl of Pembroke (brother); 14th Earl of Pembroke (brother)
- Occupation: Diplomat

Sir Michael Henry Herbert, KCMG, CB, PC (25 June 1857 – 30 September 1903), was a British diplomat and ambassador.

== Early life ==
Sir Michael Herbert was the fourth and youngest son of distinguished parents: Sidney Herbert, 1st Baron Herbert of Lea, the British statesman, and Elizabeth Herbert, Baroness Herbert of Lea, philanthropist and Roman Catholic writer and apologist.

His father, Sidney, was himself the younger son of George Augustus Herbert, 11th Earl of Pembroke, by the Russian noblewoman Countess Catherine Vorontsov, daughter of Semyon Vorontsov. In due course, two of Herbert's brothers (George, the 13th Earl and Sidney, the 14th Earl) succeeded to the earldom of Pembroke, his half-uncle Robert Herbert, 12th Earl of Pembroke having died without legitimate issue in Paris on 25 April 1862. Herbert was granted the style and precedence of the younger son of an earl by Royal Warrant on 30 May.

Herbert was brought up at the family house at Wilton House, in Wiltshire.

== Career ==
Herbert joined the Diplomatic Service, and was posted to Paris, aged 21, on 1 June 1879, where he was appointed Third Secretary in March 1880, and Second Secretary in November 1883. Herbert was trained in the diplomatic service by Richard Lyons, 1st Viscount Lyons, then British Ambassador to France, and was a member of the Tory-sympathetic 'Lyons School' of British diplomacy.

Herbert was transferred to Washington DC on 31 August 1888, where he served as Secretary and twice acted as Chargé d'affaires. In September 1893, he transferred to The Hague, and in August the following year was promoted to Secretary of Embassy at Constantinople. He was appointed a Companion of the Order of the Bath (CB) in 1896. Following a brief posting to Rome in 1897, he was appointed Minister Plenipotentiary in Paris in 1898.

=== British ambassador to the United States ===
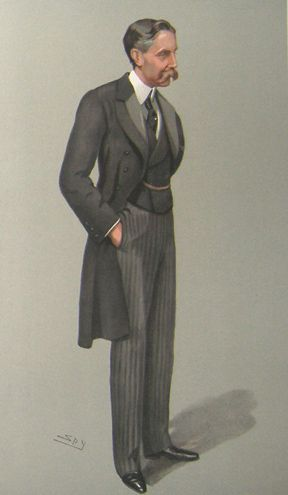
caption Herbert by 'Spy', 1903

Herbert ended his career as the second British Ambassador to the United States, in succession to Lord Pauncefote, who had died in office in May 1902. He was appointed a Knight Commander of the Order of St Michael and St George (KCMG) in the 1902 Coronation Honours list published on 26 June 1902, and received the knighthood in a private audience with King Edward VII on board HMY Victoria and Albert on 2 August 1902. He was sworn a member of the Privy Council at Buckingham Palace on 11 August 1902, before leaving Liverpool for Washington in late September.

As ambassador, he created with the U.S. Secretary of State John Hay a joint commission to establish the border between the U.S. district of Alaska and British interests in the Dominion of Canada, where gold had been found in the 1890s, which resulted in the definitive Alaskan boundary treaty of 1903. He was also involved during the Venezuela Crisis of 1902–1903.

It was announced in February 1903 that Herbert was awarded the Grand Cross of the Order of St Michael and St George (GCMG), but he does not appear to have been home to receive the award before he died.

== Personal life ==
On 27 November 1888, Herbert married Leila "Belle" Wilson (1864–1923), the second daughter of Richard Thornton Wilson, a banker and cotton broker from New York City and Newport, Rhode Island. All of the Wilson children married advantageously, namely Mary, who married New York landowner Ogden Goelet (they were the parents of Mary, Duchess of Roxburghe); and Grace, who married Cornelius Vanderbilt III; Orme, who married a daughter of Mrs. William Astor, "the" Mrs. Astor. Together, Herbert and his wife had two sons:

1. Sir Sidney Herbert, 1st Baronet, MP (1890–1939), who died unmarried at which point the baronetcy expired.
2. Lieutenant Michael George Herbert (1893–1932), who died unmarried.

He died of tuberculosis on 30 September 1903 in Davos, Switzerland, aged 47.

=== Honors and legacy ===
The town of Herbert in Saskatchewan, Canada, is named after him. Mount Herbert, also known as Boundary Peak 172 on the Canada–United States border, was named after him in 1923.

Diplomatic posts
Preceded by Lord Pauncefote	British Ambassador to the United States; 1902–1903	Succeeded by Sir Mortimer Durand
