= Grace Vanderbilt =

American socialite (1870–1953)

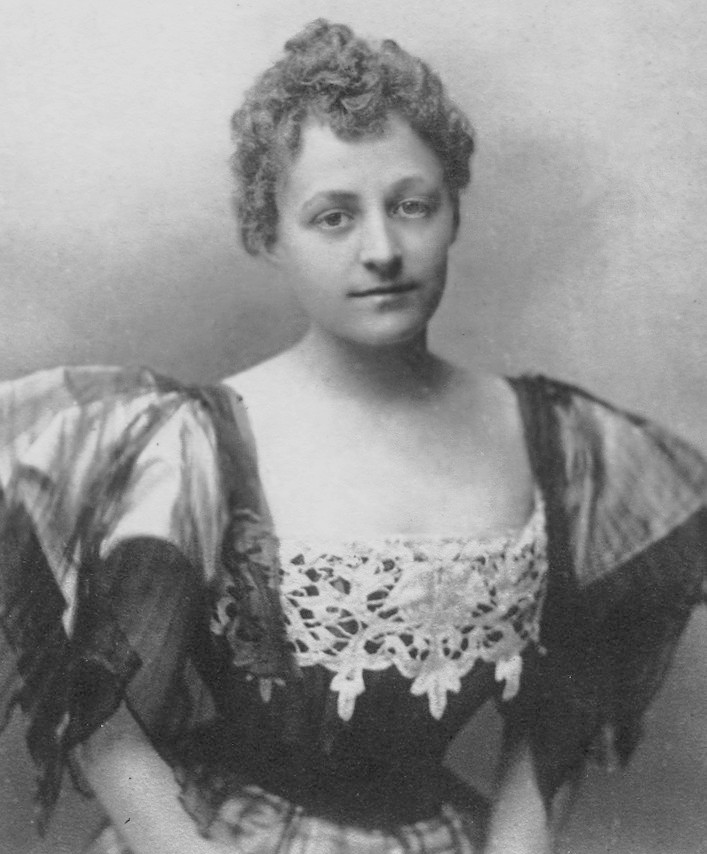
- Born: Grace Graham Wilson; September 3, 1870; New York City, U.S.
- Died: January 7, 1953 (aged 82); New York City, U.S.
- Resting place: Moravian Cemetery
- Spouse: Cornelius Vanderbilt III (m. 1896; died 1942)
- Children: Cornelius Vanderbilt IV; Grace Stevens Vanderbilt https://househistree.com/people/grace-vanderbilt
- Parent(s): Richard Thornton Wilson; Melissa Clementine Johnston
- Relatives: Mary Wilson Goelet (sister); Richard Thornton Wilson Jr. (brother); Marshall Orme Wilson (brother); Mary Goelet (niece)

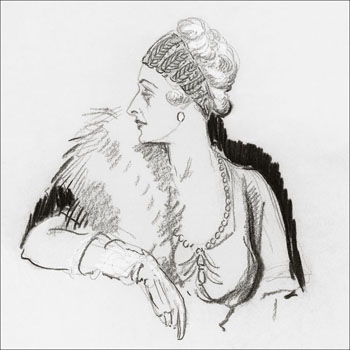
Vanderbilt in 1936 by Porter Woodruff

Grace Graham Vanderbilt (née Wilson; September 3, 1870 – January 7, 1953) was an American socialite. She was the wife of Cornelius Vanderbilt III. She was one of the last Vanderbilts to live the luxurious life of the "head of society" that her predecessors such as Alice and Alva Vanderbilt enjoyed.

== Early years ==
Grace was born on September 3, 1870, at 512 Fifth Avenue in Manhattan. She was the youngest child of New York banker Richard Thornton Wilson and Melissa Clementine Johnston. Grace's sister Mary ("May") married Ogden Goelet and her sister Belle married Sir Michael Henry Herbert, younger brother of the 13th Earl of Pembroke. The sisters were known in London society as "the marrying Wilsons." One of her brothers was banker Richard Thornton Wilson Jr. Another brother, Marshall Orme Wilson, married Caroline "Carrie" Astor, youngest daughter of William Backhouse Astor Jr. and Caroline Webster Schermerhorn of the Astor family.

== Personal life ==
She eloped with Cornelius "Neily" Vanderbilt III (1873–1942), son of Cornelius Vanderbilt II and Alice Claypoole Gwynne of the Vanderbilt family, in 1896. This led to a violent disagreement between Neily and his father, which lasted many years. Neily and Grace remained married for the rest of their lives and had two children:

- Cornelius Vanderbilt IV (1898–1974), who married seven times but had no children.
- Grace Vanderbilt (1899–1964), who married Henry Gassaway Davis (1902–1984) in 1927. They divorced in 1936 and she married Robert Livingston Stevens (1907–1972), a grandson of Edwin Augustus and Martha Bayard Stevens.

Grace and Neily rented Beaulieu House in Newport, Rhode Island, the former home of John Jacob Astor III.

Following World War I, Grace and Neily frequently returned to Europe, becoming friends and guests of numerous members of European royalty including Kaiser Wilhelm II of Germany, and his brother, Prince Henry of Prussia, King Albert I of Belgium, Crown Prince Olav of Norway, Queen Marie of Romania, the Shah of Iran, and every British monarch since Queen Victoria.

In 1940, Neily sold his Fifth Avenue mansion, which he inherited from his uncle George Washington Vanderbilt II upon his death in 1914, in New York City to members of the Astor family but remained living there until his death from a cerebral hemorrhage while vacationing in Miami Beach, Florida, aboard his yacht in 1942. Following Neily's death Grace Vanderbilt was forced to move out of their massive Fifth Avenue mansion, and moved into the William Starr Miller House at 1048 Fifth Avenue which still stands today as the Neue Galerie.

=== Death and legacy ===
Grace lived another eleven years, and she died on January 7, 1953. They are buried together in the Vanderbilt Family Mausoleum in New Dorp on Staten Island, New York.
