= Glenmere Mansion =

Luxury hotel and spa in New York, US

- Interactive map of the Glenmere Mansion area

General information
- Architectural style: Tuscan
- Location: 634 Pine Hill Road; Chester, New York
- Coordinates: 41°20′18.6″N 74°19′25.9″W
- Completed: 1911
- Client: Robert Wilson Goelet

Design and construction
- Architects: Carrère and Hastings; Beatrix Farrand (grounds)

Website
- www.glenmeremansion.com

The Glenmere Mansion is a luxury hotel and spa overlooking Glenmere Lake, approximately 50 miles northwest of New York City in Orange County, New York. It was built in 1911 as the residence of real estate developer Robert Wilson Goelet (not to be confused with his first cousin, Robert Walton Goelet) on the grounds of his sprawling estate in Sugar Loaf, a hamlet of the town of Chester.

== History ==
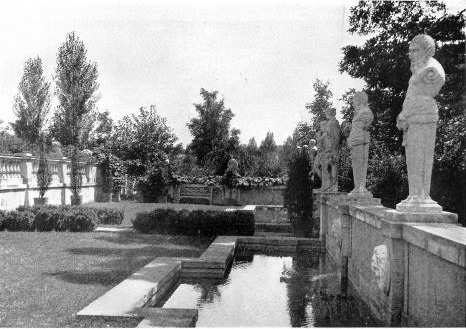
The wall pools of Glenmere's southern garden, c. 1920

Robert Wilson Goelet (1880–1966), the only son of Ogden Goelet, commissioned the architects Carrère and Hastings to design a country villa in 1911. It was designed in a Tuscan style because Goelet's wife, the former Miss Elsie Whelen of Philadelphia, had always wanted to live in an Italian villa. The house features a central courtyard with an Italian marble fountain, and ochre-colored stucco walls. Beatrix Farrand was hired to landscape the grounds, and Samuel Yellin did the ironwork for the house.

In addition to their horses, Goelet and his wife were breeders of Highland Terriers and Great Danes, and they maintained extensive kennels. Soon, the estate and its storied hunting grounds became a regular haunt of Babe Ruth, and the Duke and Duchess of Windsor.

Goelet hosted numerous sporting-set events at the estate, including equine ice-racing. The younger of Goelet's two sons, Peter, began radio station WGNY on the grounds of the mansion in 1930.

Glenmere was sold to Abraham Prusoff during World War II. He transformed the private mansion into a resort hotel with upscale amenities, including a golf course, ski run, and tennis courts. By the 1960s, Prusoff found it increasingly difficult to keep the resort's finances in order. In the next decade, the mansion and estate were seized by Orange County as a tax lien. In 1985, the mansion and estate were purchased at a tax auction by real estate magnate Rickey Mandel.

== Current use ==
The mansion changed hands again in 2007, becoming a luxury 19-room hotel, restaurant, and spa, after undergoing an extensive and costly renovation. In 2008, the restoration project was temporarily halted over concern for the endangered Northern cricket frog.

In 2010, the New York State Department of Environmental Conservation again halted the construction when it became apparent that the developers were operating without the required permits and endangering the Northern cricket frog and plant life in the area. The mansion's developers were fined and cited by the New York Department of Environmental Conservation for violations of having improper paperwork with regard to the impact of construction on the endangered Northern cricket frog. Studies found no frog habitats on the property, and the mansion was made into a luxury hotel whose amenities include a luxury penthouse costing $3,400 a night.
