= Ogden Goelet =

American businessman

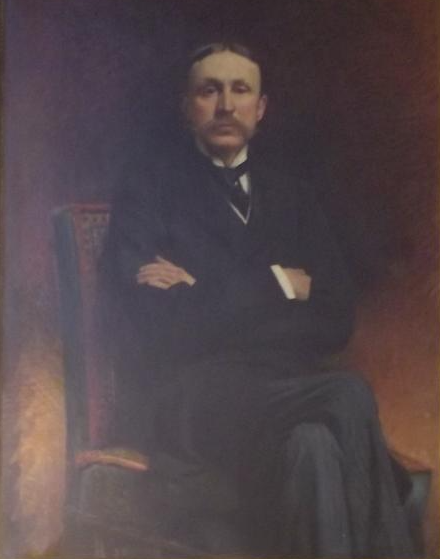
- Born: June 11, 1851; New York City, U.S.
- Died: August 27, 1897 (aged 46); Cowes, Isle of Wight
- Occupation: Real estate developer
- Spouse: Mary Rita Wilson (m. 1878)
- Children: Mary Goelet; Robert Wilson Goelet
- Parent(s): Robert Goelet Sr. Sarah Ogden
- Relatives: See Goelet family

Ogden Goelet (June 11, 1851 New York City – August 27, 1897 Cowes, Isle of Wight) was an American heir, businessman and yachtsman from New York City during the Gilded Age. With his wife, he built Ochre Court in Newport, Rhode Island, his son built Glenmere mansion, and his daughter, Mary Goelet, married Henry Innes-Ker, 8th Duke of Roxburghe.

== Early life ==
Ogden Goelet was born on September 29, 1851, in Manhattan, New York City to Robert Goelet Sr. and Sarah Ogden Goelet. His father was a prominent landlord in New York City, as was his uncle, Peter Goelet, who was named after Peter Goelet, Ogden's great-grandfather. His parents resided at 5 State Street, overlooking the Battery in Manhattan.

Goelet's older brother was real estate developer Robert Goelet, and his nephew was Robert Walton Goelet. His paternal aunt, Hannah Green Goelet, was married to Thomas Russell Gerry, a son of U.S. Vice President Elbridge Gerry. His grandfather was the merchant and landowner Peter P. Goelet. Through this marriage, Goelet was a first cousin of Elbridge Thomas Gerry.

== Career ==
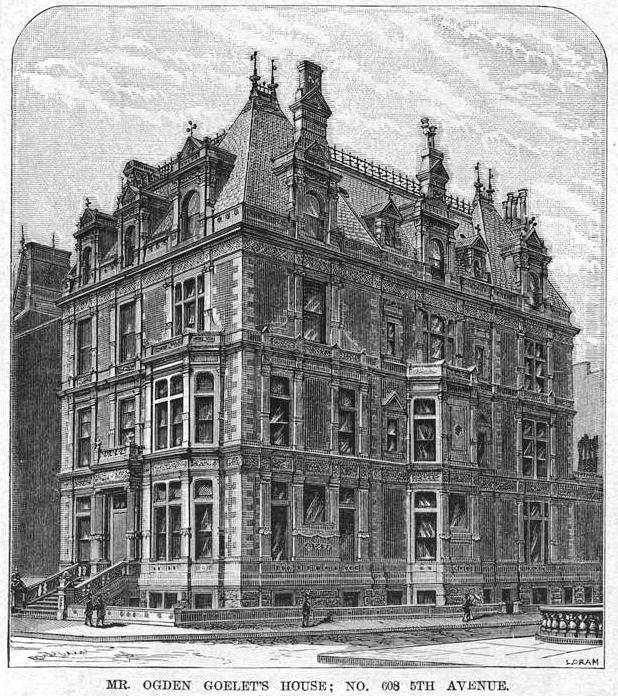
Ogden Goelet's mansion at 608 Fifth Avenue, designed by E.H. Kendall

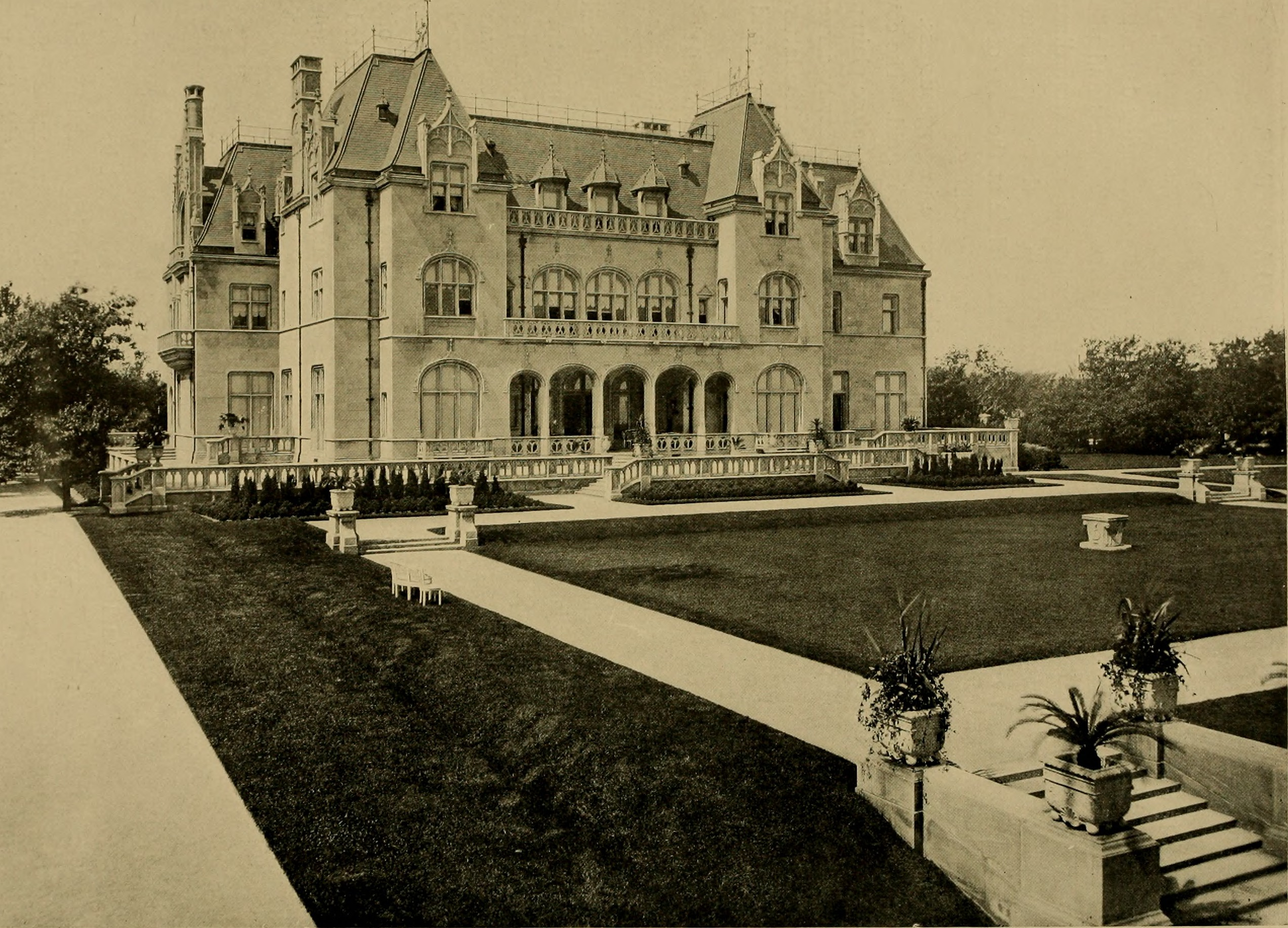
Goelet's Newport residence, Ochre Court in 1904

Along with his brother, he managed the real estate of his father, Robert Goelet, and his uncle Peter Goelet, who both died in 1879. After his father's and uncle's deaths, he inherited almost half their fortune, along with his brother. In New York, he was one of the stockholders of the Metropolitan Opera House, holding Box No. 1.

=== Society life ===
In 1892, Goelet and his wife Mary were included in Ward McAllister's "Four Hundred", purported to be an index of New York's best families, published in The New York Times. Conveniently, 400 was the number of people that could fit into Mrs. Astor's ballroom. Mary was known as one of the viceregal leaders of the Ultra-fashionable 150, among Mrs. Astor, Mrs. Ogden Mills, Mrs. John Jacob Astor, and Mrs. Cornelius Vanderbilt Jr.

=== Yachting ===
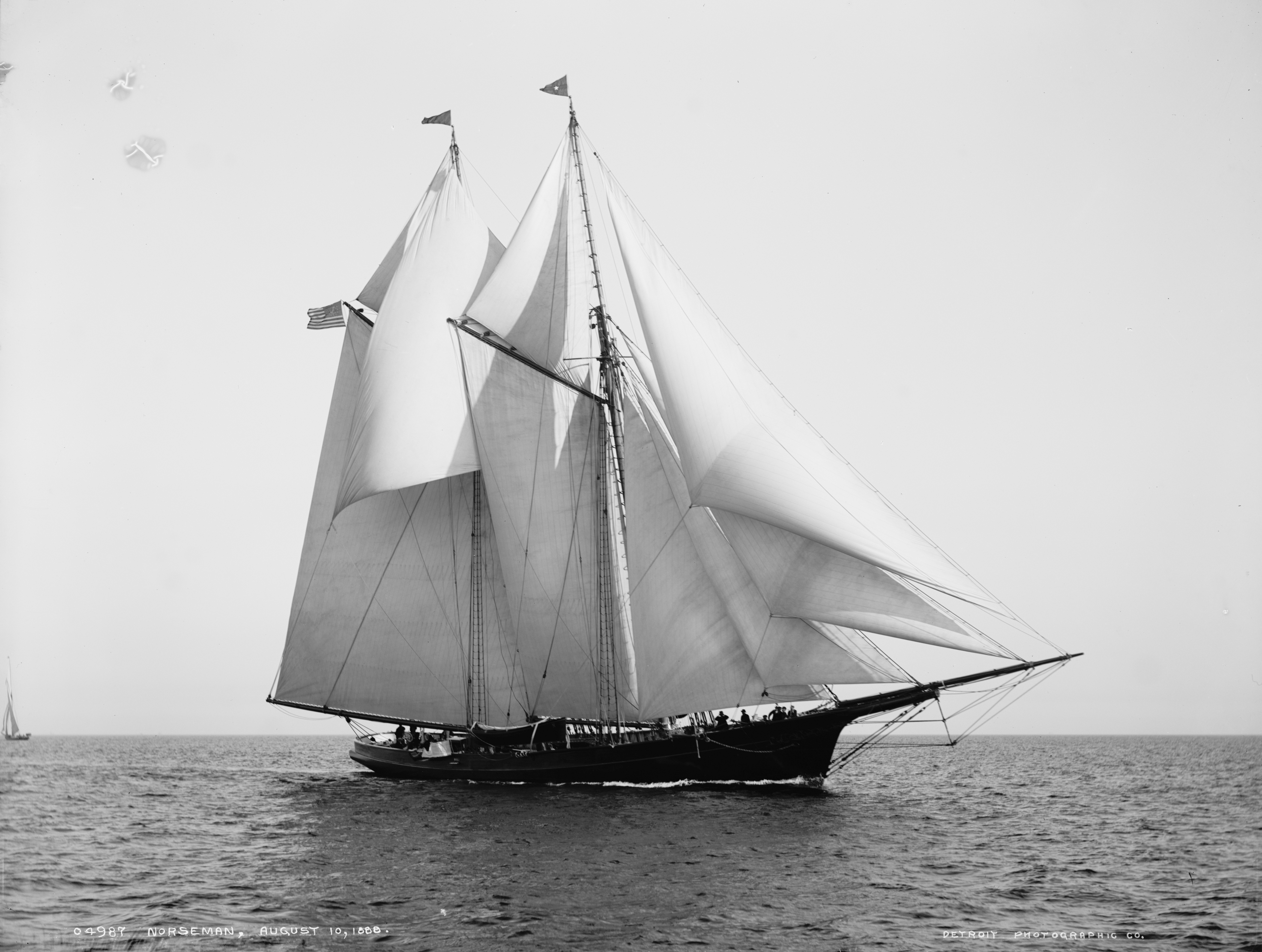
Goelet's schooner Norseman (1881)

He had several yachts including a schooner, Norseman that was designed by William Townsend and built in 1881 at the Richard & Cornelius Poillon shipyard in Brooklyn. From 1893 he also chartered Lillie Langtry's yacht White Ladye. His final yacht was named Mayflower and was designed by George Lennox Watson in 1896 and built on the Clyde (Scotland) by J & G Thompson. After Goelet's death the yacht was sold to the US Navy and became USS Mayflower. Goelet's brother, Robert, had a similar yacht built at the same time, at a different Clydeside shipyard. This later became USS Nahma.

Goelet's admiration for yacht racing led him to offer what became known as the Goelet Cup. Goelet awarded 31 trophies before his death in 1897. John Jacob Astor IV continued the tradition after Goelet's death.

=== Homes ===
Goelet and his wife owned a townhouse at 608 Fifth Avenue in New York City and a villa in Nice, France. When in London, they lived at Wimbourne House.

In 1892, he and his wife commissioned Ochre Court, a châteauesque mansion in Newport, Rhode Island. The home was built at a cost of $4.5 million and was the second largest mansion in Newport after nearby The Breakers, both designed by architect Richard Morris Hunt.

== Personal life ==
In 1878, he married Mary Rita Wilson (1855–1929), daughter of Richard Thornton Wilson Sr. and Melissa Clementine Johnston. Her siblings included the banker Richard Thornton Wilson Jr. and socialite Grace Graham Wilson, who was married to Cornelius Vanderbilt III. Together, they were the parents of two children:

- Mary Goelet (1878–1937), who married Henry Innes-Ker, 8th Duke of Roxburghe (1876–1932) in 1903.
- Robert Wilson Goelet (1880–1966), who built Glenmere mansion.

He was a member of the New York Yacht Club for 17 years, as well as the Knickerbocker Club, Metropolitan Club, and Union Club.

On August 27, 1897, after over five years spent abroad, Goelet died aboard his yacht in the town of Cowes in the Isle of Wight after having been ill for two months. He had been attended to by William Broadbent, doctor to the Prince of Wales, with whom he was close friends. His family and body sailed back to the United States and his funeral was held aboard his yacht in Newport and he was buried at Woodlawn Cemetery (Bronx, New York). His widow died in 1929.

=== Estate ===
Ogden Goelet's will was submitted to the New York Surrogate's Court for Probate on 28 September 1897. In 1904, both The Washington Post and The New York Times newspapers reported that the total value of Goelet's fortune had been valued at $35,000,000 to $45,000,000 in 1897.

In his will, except for single bequests of $50,000 and $5,000, Ogden Goelet bequeathed the entirety of his estate to his widow and children. Specific bequests to his widow Mary Wilson Goelet included:

- A life interest in the couple's box at the Metropolitan Opera House, which would then revert to their daughter Mary;
- His household possessions, including artworks, jewellery, books, etc.
- An annuity of $150,000 for the remainder of her lifetime;
- A life interest in the couple's New York home at 608 Fifth Avenue and the income from a $300,000 trust; if she chose to vacate the house, she was to receive the trust funds outright; and,
- All of his property in Newport.

Goelet's residuary estate, valued at approximately $30,000,000, was placed in a trust, with the income payable to his widow and two children. During the lifetime of Mary Wilson Goelet, she would receive 50% of the trust income, whilst their two children Robert Wilson Goelet and Mary Goelet would initially receive 25% each, which would increase to 50% each after their mother's death.
