= Mary Goelet =

American-born British peeress (1878–1937)

Her Grace The Duchess of Roxburghe
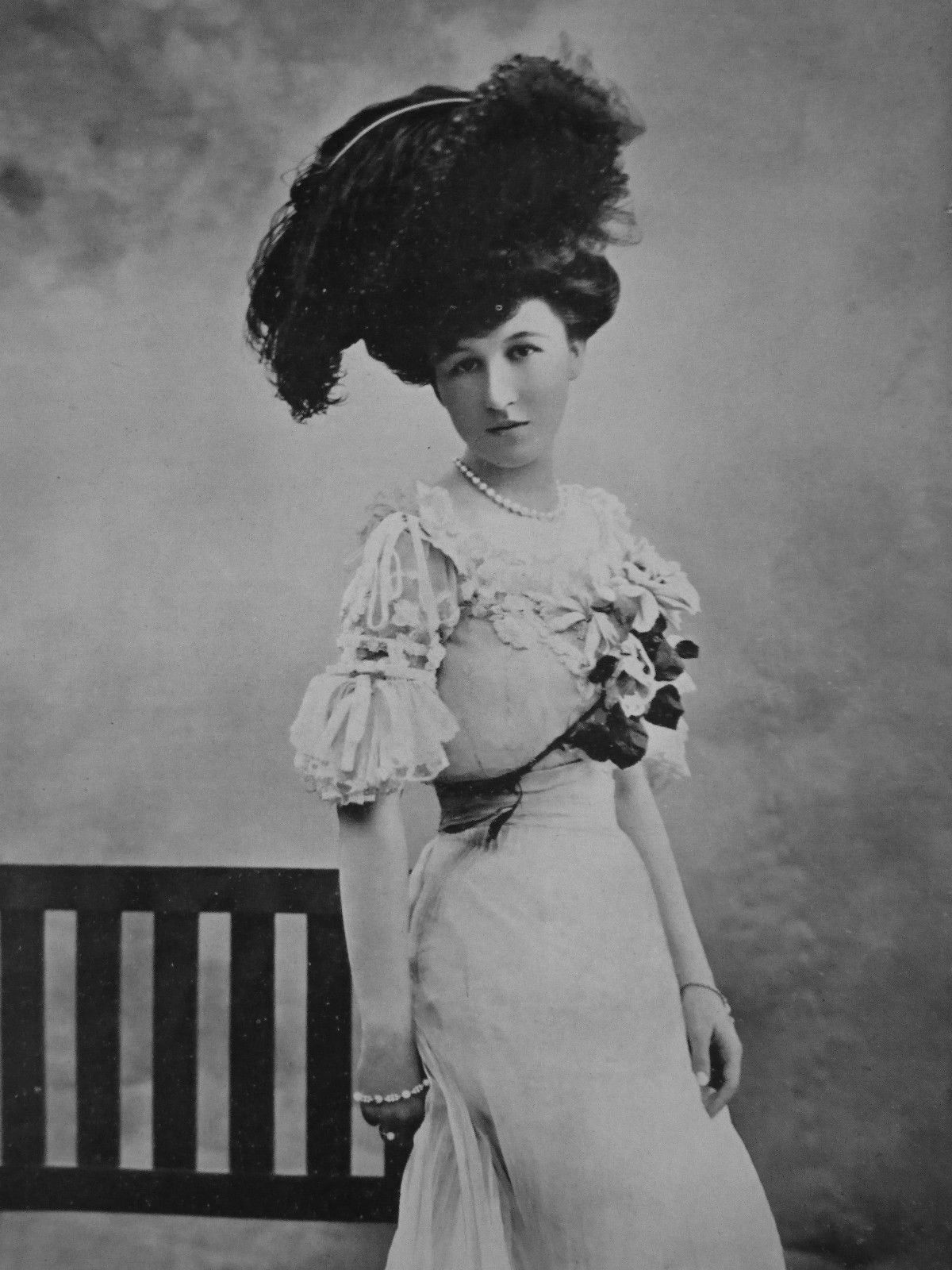
- Mary Goelet (1903)

Personal details
- Born: Mary Goelet; 6 October 1878 New York City, United States
- Died: 26 April 1937 (aged 58) London, England
- Spouse: Henry Innes-Ker, 8th Duke of Roxburghe (m. 1903; died 1932)
- Children: George Innes-Ker, 9th Duke of Roxburghe
- Parents: Ogden Goelet; Mary Wilson
- Relatives: See Goelet family

Mary "May" Innes-Ker, Duchess of Roxburghe (née Goelet; 6 October 1878 – 26 April 1937), was an American-born heiress and socialite who married into Scottish nobility.

== Early life ==
Mary Goelet was born in 1878. Her parents were Mary Wilson and Ogden Goelet, a prominent heir and landlord in New York City and great-grandson of Peter Goelet, heir to one of the largest fortunes of the time. Her only sibling was a younger brother, Robert, who built Glenmere Mansion.

Through her mother, she was a niece of Richard Thornton Wilson Jr. and Grace Vanderbilt. Through her father, she was a niece of Robert Goelet, a first cousin of Robert Walton Goelet, and a granddaughter of Robert Goelet Sr., co-founder of the Chemical Bank of New York.

Following her father's death in 1897, upon her 21st birthday she inherited $500,000 outright and a $10,000,000 Trust fund. Under the terms of her father's will, she would also receive half of his $30,000,000 residuary estate following the death of her mother.

== Personal life ==
In 1897, she was rumored to be engaged to William Montagu, the 20-year-old 9th Duke of Manchester. He later married a different American, Helena Zimmerman, daughter of industrialist Eugene Zimmerman of Cincinnati, Ohio, in 1900.

In late December 1898, she was rumored once more to be engaged to Viscount Crichton, eldest son and heir of 4th Earl Erne.

On 10 November 1903, she married Henry John Innes-Ker, 8th Duke of Roxburghe. He was the eldest son of the 7th Duke of Roxburghe and Lady Anne Spencer-Churchill (fourth daughter of the 7th Duke of Marlborough and Lady Frances Vane). His first cousins were the 9th Duke of Malborough (who famously married Consuelo Vanderbilt) and Sir Winston Churchill. After ten years of childlessness, Mary gave birth to a son and heir:

- George Innes-Ker, 9th Duke of Roxburghe (7 September 1913 – 26 September 1974), who succeeded his father in 1932.

The Duchess of Roxburghe died on 26 April 1937, in London.

=== Life in Scotland ===
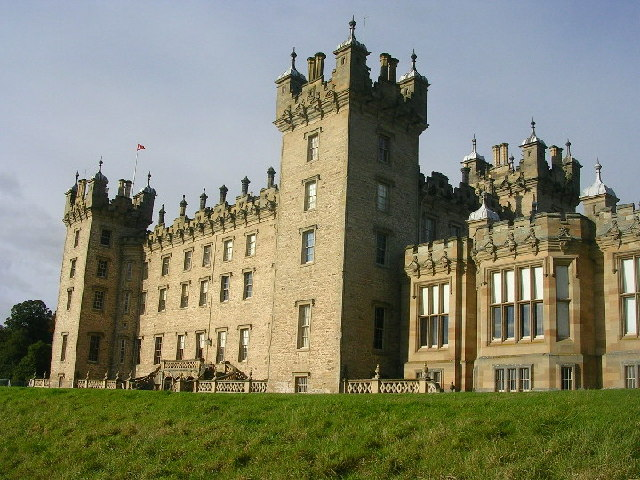
The Duchess of Roxburghe's residence in Scotland, Floors Castle

The Duke and Duchess settled at Floors Castle, where Mary decorated the ancient residence with her own collection of art including a priceless series of 17th century Gobelins Manufactory tapestries.

At the time of her marriage, she was the wealthiest American heiress, with a trust fund of $10,000,000 from her father's estate and a further reversionary interest in half of his $30,000,000 residuary estate.

In 1913, she first became a guest of Queen Mary and King George V at Windsor Castle. She and the Duke were also the guests of King Edward VII and Queen Alexandra.

In 1929, she inherited $3,000,000 after the death of her mother, as well as the Goelet art collection. Under the terms of her father's will, half of his $30,000,000 residuary estate passed to Mary following her mother's death.

== See also ==
- Duke of Roxburghe
