= William Backhouse Astor Jr. =

American businessman (1829–1892)

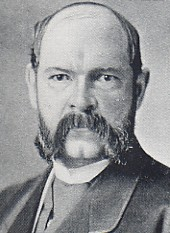
- Born: William Backhouse Astor Jr. July 12, 1829; New York City, New York, U.S.
- Died: April 25, 1892 (aged 62); Paris, France
- Burial place: Trinity Church Cemetery
- Education: Columbia College
- Spouse: Caroline Webster Schermerhorn (m. 1853)
- Children: 5, including Charlotte, Caroline, and Jack
- Parent(s): William Backhouse Astor Sr. Margaret Rebecca Armstrong
- Relatives: See Astor family

William Backhouse Astor Jr. (July 12, 1829 – April 25, 1892) was an American businessman, racehorse owner/breeder, and yachtsman who was a member of the prominent Astor family. His wife, Caroline Schermerhorn Astor, served as the leader of New York society's "Four Hundred" during the Gilded Age.

== Early years ==
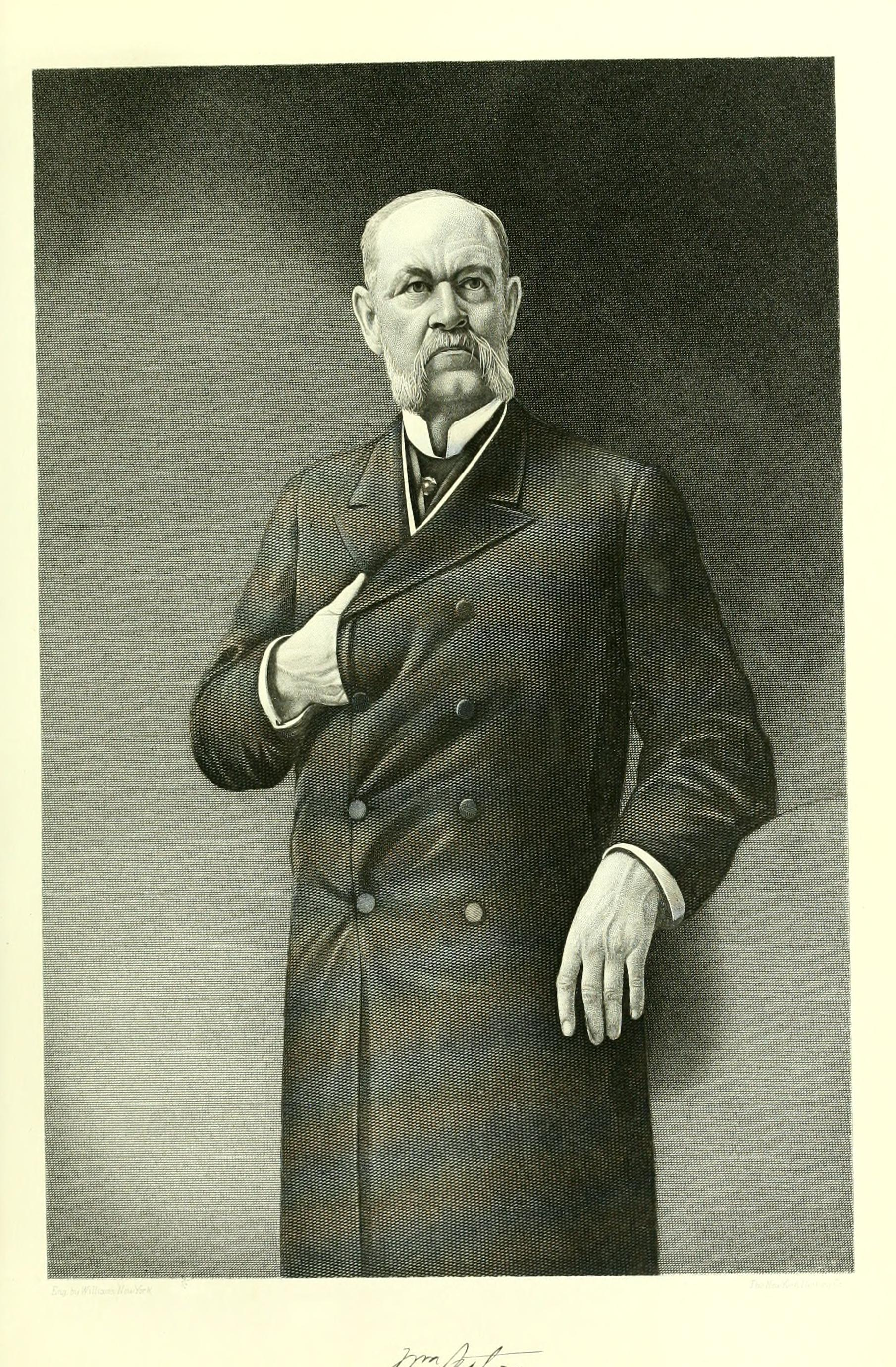
William B. Astor Jr. from New York State's Prominent and Progressive Men, 1900.

William Backhouse Astor Jr. was born on July 12, 1829, in New York City, New York. He was the middle son of real estate businessman William Backhouse Astor Sr. (1792–1875) and Margaret Rebecca (née Armstrong) Astor (1800–1872). His siblings included elder brother John Jacob Astor III, who married Charlotte Augusta Gibbes; (Note: His older brother John Jacob Astor III (1822–1890) was the father of William Waldorf Astor (1848–1919), who later moved to England and became the 1st Viscount Astor.) Emily Astor, who married Samuel Cutler Ward; (Note: Samuel Cutler Ward, a banker with Prime, Ward & King, was a son of Samuel Ward and a brother of poet Julia Ward Howe.) Laura Eugenia Astor, who married Franklin Hughes Delano; (Note: Franklin Hughes Delano was a grand-uncle and namesake of President Franklin Delano Roosevelt.) Mary Alida Astor, who married John Carey; Henry Astor, who married Malvina Dinehart; and Sarah Astor, who died in infancy.

Astor's paternal grandparents were fur-trader John Jacob Astor and Sarah Cox (née Todd) Astor. His maternal grandparents were U.S. Senator John Armstrong Jr. and Alida (née Livingston) Armstrong of the Livingston family.

A well-liked man, Astor graduated from Columbia College in 1849. He was a member of Columbia's Philolexian Society.

== Subsequent activity ==
He supported the abolition of slavery before the American Civil War, and during the war, he personally bore the cost to equip an entire Union Army regiment.

Unlike his business-oriented father, William Jr. did not aggressively pursue an expansion of his inherited fortune. Instead, he preferred life aboard the Ambassadress, at that time the biggest private yacht in the world, or horseback riding at Ferncliff, the large estate he had built on the Hudson River. Astor's horse Vagrant won the second running of the Kentucky Derby, in 1876.

=== Florida involvement ===
William Jr. often spent winters aboard his yacht in Jacksonville, Florida, and he was responsible for the construction of a number of prominent buildings in the city. He and sixteen other businessmen founded the Florida Yacht Club in Jacksonville in 1876, although he was the only person in Florida to actually own a yacht. The club is now the oldest social club in Jacksonville and one of the oldest yacht clubs in the United States. Liking the area, Astor in 1874 purchased a land tract of around 80,000 acres (320 km^{2}) along the St. Johns River north of Orlando, in an area that is now Lake County, Florida. There he and two partners used 12,000 acres (49 km^{2}) to build an entire town that he named Manhattan; the name was later changed to Astor in his honor.

His project, which would come to include several hotels, began with the construction of wharves on the river to accommodate steamboats. These steamboats attracted a steamship agency that could bring in the necessary materials and supplies. Astor enjoyed his development and purchased a railroad that connected the town to the "Great Lakes Region" of Florida. He donated the town's first church and the land for the local non-denominational cemetery, and he also helped build a schoolhouse, both of which are still standing today. In 1875, one of the many nearby lakes was named Lake Schermerhorn after his wife, Lina Schermerhorn.

The town boomed, and Astor, with an eye on the large New York market, expanded his interests to a grapefruit grove; this fruit at the time was only available on a very limited basis in other parts of the United States. He did not live long enough to see the orchard grow to production. Following his death on April 25, 1892, the property fell to his son Jack. By then though, rapid changes were taking place throughout Florida. New railroads had been built in 1885 through the central and western part of the state, and in the late 1890s Henry Flagler built a railroad line running down Florida's east coast from Daytona Beach. All this expansion left the town of Astor isolated and it was all but abandoned after train service was discontinued.

== Personal life ==
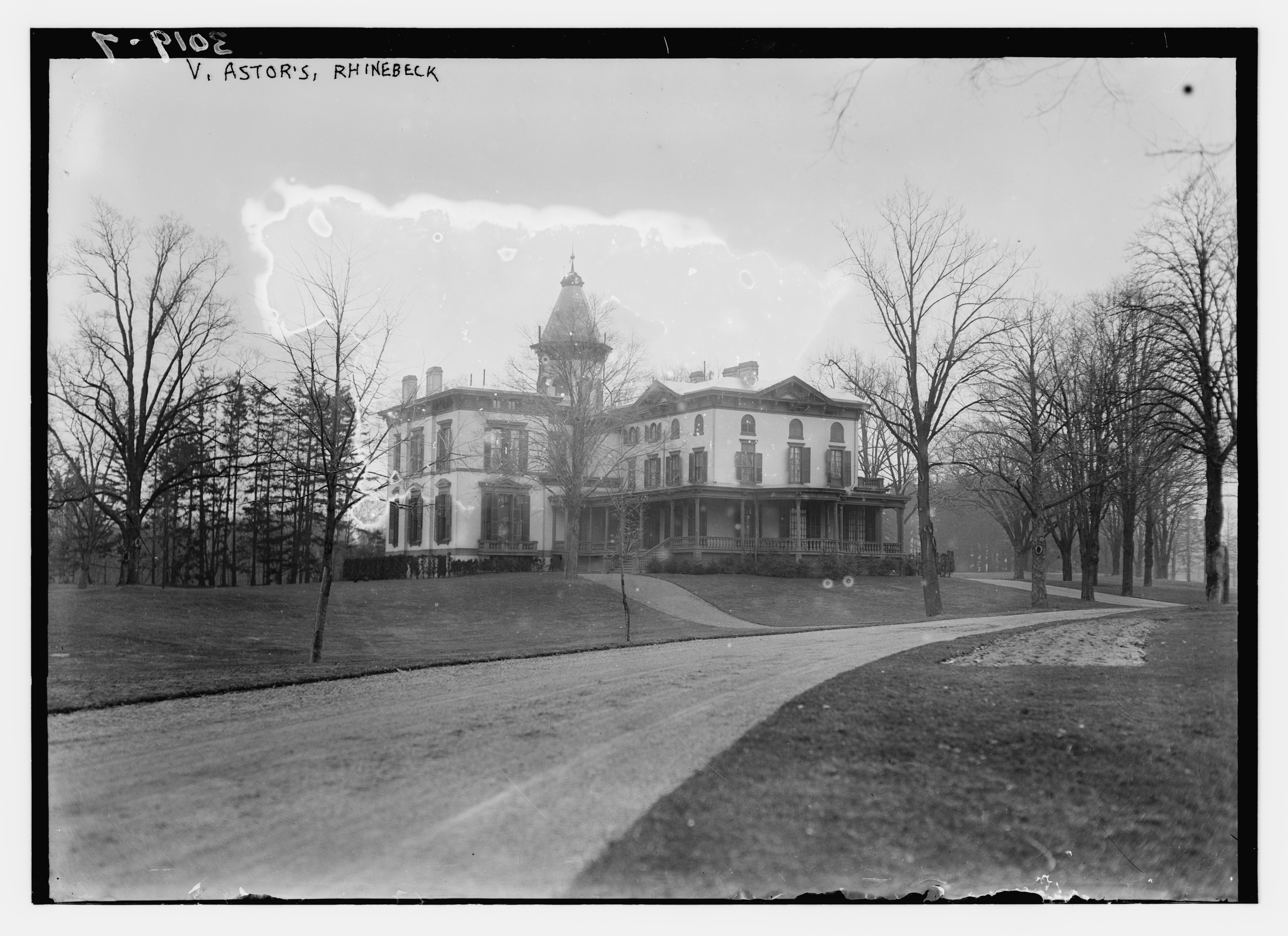
Ferncliff, the Astor family's country estate in Rhinebeck, New York

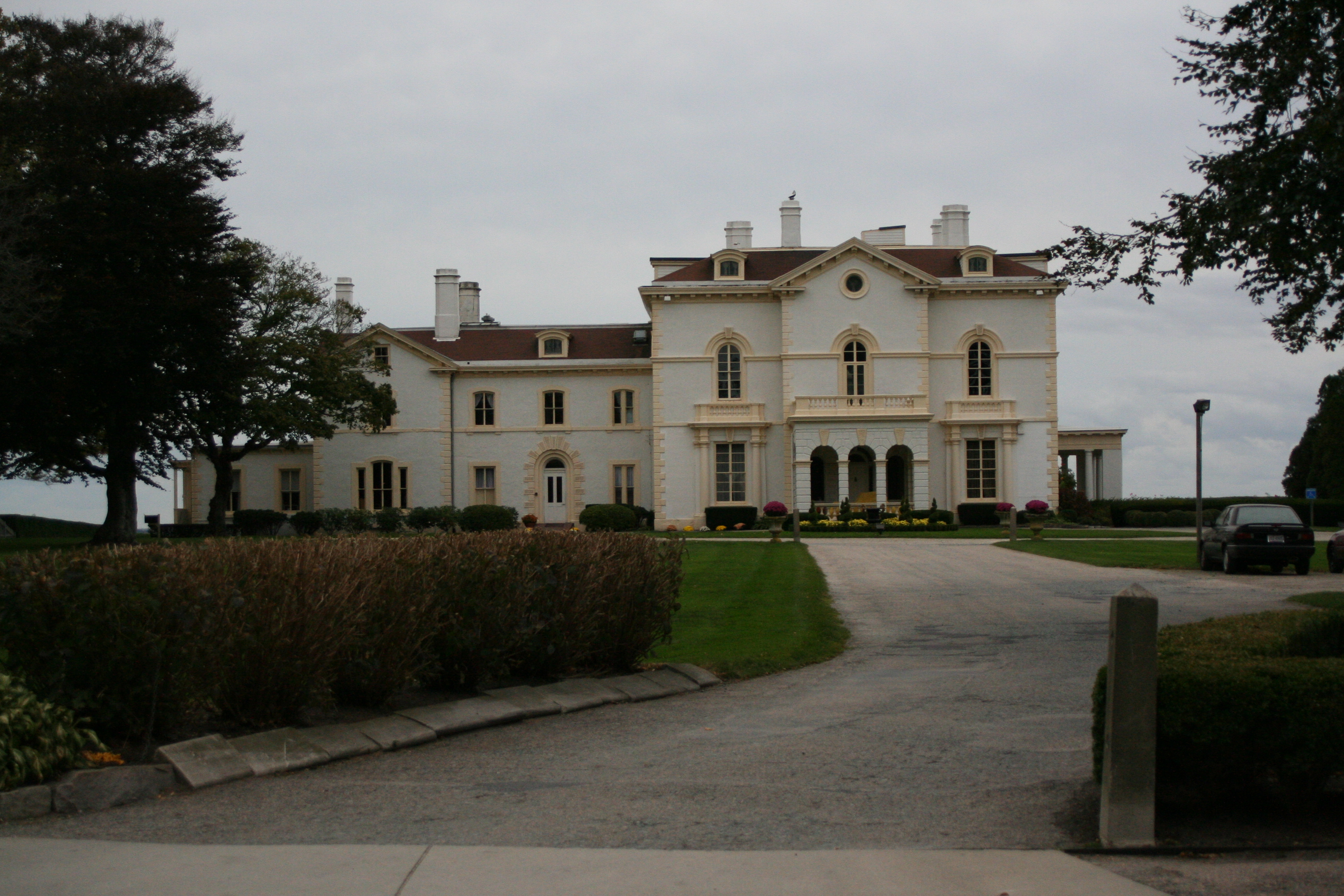
Beechwood, the Astors' summer home in Newport, Rhode Island

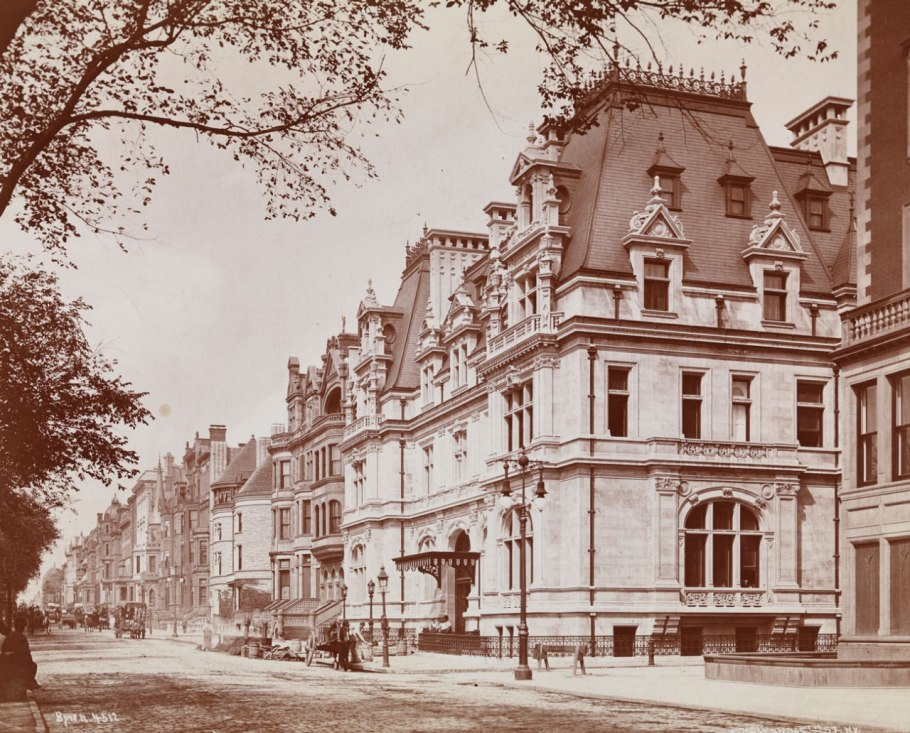
The Mrs. William B. Astor House at 841 Fifth Avenue in Manhattan, 1895

On September 23, 1853, he married the socially ambitious Caroline Webster "Lina" Schermerhorn (1830–1908) at Trinity Church in Manhattan. Her parents were Abraham Schermerhorn, a wealthy New York City merchant, and Helen Van Cortlandt (née White) Schermerhorn. Lina would go on to reign over New York and Newport society known simply as "the Mrs. Astor." William Jr. had little interest in society parties, and reportedly, Lina would try to keep him at his club late to prevent him coming home and sending the orchestra out and his children to bed.

Together, William Jr. and Lina had five children:

- Emily Astor (1854–1881), who married sportsman/politician James John Van Alen (1848–1923) and had three children.
- Helen Schermerhorn Astor (1855–1893), who married diplomat James Roosevelt "Rosey" Roosevelt (1854–1927), half-brother of President Franklin Delano Roosevelt, and had two children.
- Charlotte Augusta Astor (1858–1920), who married James Coleman Drayton (1852–1934) and had four children. They divorced and she later married George Ogilvy Haig (1859–1905).
- Caroline Schermerhorn "Carrie" Astor (1861–1948), who married Marshall Orme Wilson (1860–1926), brother of banker Richard Thornton Wilson Jr. and socialite Grace Graham Wilson, and had two sons.
- John Jacob "Jack" Astor IV (1864–1912), who married socialite Ava Lowle Willing (1868–1958) and had two children; he later married socialite Madeleine Talmage Force (1893–1940), the sister of real estate businesswoman/socialite Katherine Emmons Force, and had one son. He died in the sinking of RMS Titanic in 1912.

William Backhouse Astor Jr. died of an aneurysm at the Hotel Liverpool in Paris, on April 25, 1892. Astor, an Episcopalian, was buried in Trinity Church Cemetery in New York City. He is one of several responsible for opening up the tourist trade in Florida. His widow died years later in 1908.
