= Cornelius Vanderbilt III =

American military officer and engineer

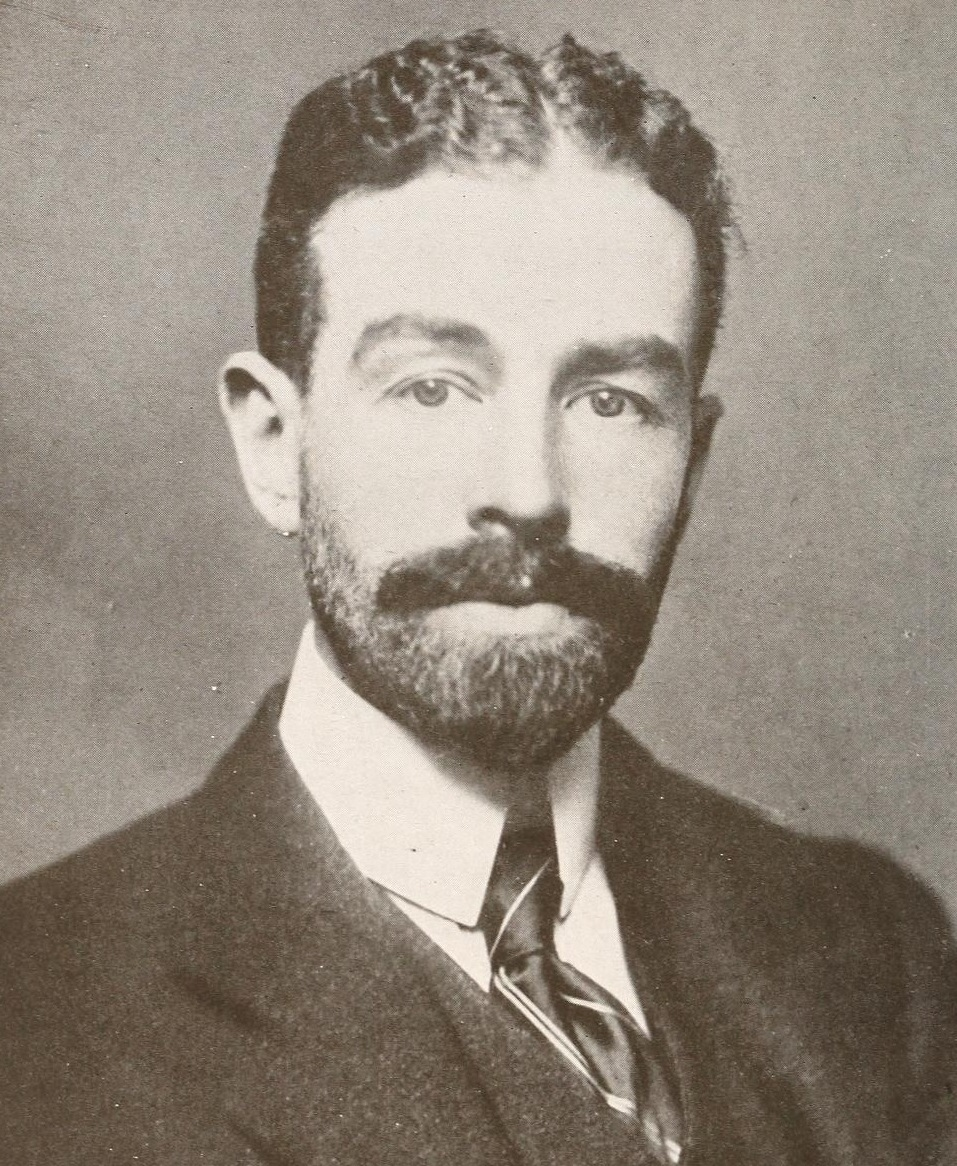
- From 1919's Men Who Are Making America
- Born: September 5, 1873; New York City, U.S.
- Died: March 1, 1942 (aged 68); Miami Beach, Florida, U.S.
- Resting place: Vanderbilt Family Mausoleum, Staten Island, New York
- Other name: Neily
- Education: Yale University (BA, BPh, ME)
- Political party: Republican
- Spouse: Grace Graham Wilson (m. 1896)
- Children: Cornelius Vanderbilt IV; Grace Vanderbilt
- Parent(s): Cornelius Vanderbilt II; Alice Claypoole Gwynne
- Military career
- Service: New York Army National Guard; United States Army; Organized Reserve Corps
- Service years: 1901–1917 (National Guard); 1917–1919 (Army); 1919–1935 (Reserve)
- Rank: Brigadier General
- Unit: U.S. Army Corps of Engineers
- Commands: 22nd Engineer Regiment (National Guard); 102nd Engineer Regiment (Army); 77th Infantry Division (Reserve)
- Conflicts: Pancho Villa Expedition; World War I
- Awards: Army Distinguished Service Medal; Conspicuous Service Cross (New York); Legion of Honor (Commander) (France); Order of the Crown (Commander) (Belgium); Croix de Guerre (Belgium)

Brigadier General Cornelius "Neily" Vanderbilt III (September 5, 1873 – March 1, 1942) was an American military officer, inventor, engineer, and yachtsman. He was a member of the Vanderbilt family.

== Early life ==
Born in New York City to Cornelius Vanderbilt II and Alice Claypoole Gwynne, he was educated by private tutors and at St. Paul's School in Concord, New Hampshire. Vanderbilt attended Yale University and graduated with a Bachelor of Arts degree in 1895. Against his father's wishes, in August 1896 he married Grace Graham Wilson, the youngest child of New York banker Richard Thornton Wilson Sr., and Melissa Clementine Johnston. As a consequence, his father disinherited him. Vanderbilt continued to study at Yale, and earned a Bachelor of Philosophy degree in 1898 and a Master of Engineering degree in mechanical engineering in 1899.

== Inheritance ==
Upon his father's death in 1899 Vanderbilt received $500,000 in cash and the income from a $1 million trust fund. The bulk of his father's $70 million estate went to Vanderbilt's brother Alfred, who then transferred $6 million to Vanderbilt. However, as a result of his parents' attitude towards his marriage, it would be 27 years after his father's death before he finally reconciled with his aging mother. Vanderbilt and his wife Grace remained married until his death and had two children, Cornelius IV (1898–1974), who would marry seven times, and Grace (September 25, 1899 – January 28, 1964).

== Yachting ==
As with other members of the Vanderbilt family, yachting was one of Vanderbilt's favorite pastimes as an escape from a busy life that included a seat on the boards of directors of a number of major American corporations. He was a member of the nine-member syndicate that built the yacht Reliance, the largest racing yacht in history with a crew of 70, for the successful defense of the America's Cup in 1903.

He was commodore of the New York Yacht Club from 1906 to 1908. In 1910, he skippered his 65-foot sloop Aurora to victory in the New York Yacht Club's race for the King Edward VII Cup in Newport, RI.

Prior to the First World War, Vanderbilt's personal yacht was the North Star in which he and his family toured Europe and hosted many distinguished guests including King Edward VII, Kaiser Wilhelm II and Czar Nicholas II. The North Star was in British waters at the outbreak of the First World War in 1914, and was seized by the British government for use as a hospital ship with the promise it would be returned after the war. The North Star was damaged in action and was used after the war as a merchant ship trading with China.

On April 29, 1930, Vanderbilt's yacht, the Winchester, was set ablaze following an explosion. No one was injured as the crew were all eating in the galley, up front, but her owner's suite and guest suites sustained $500,000 of damage.

== Military service ==
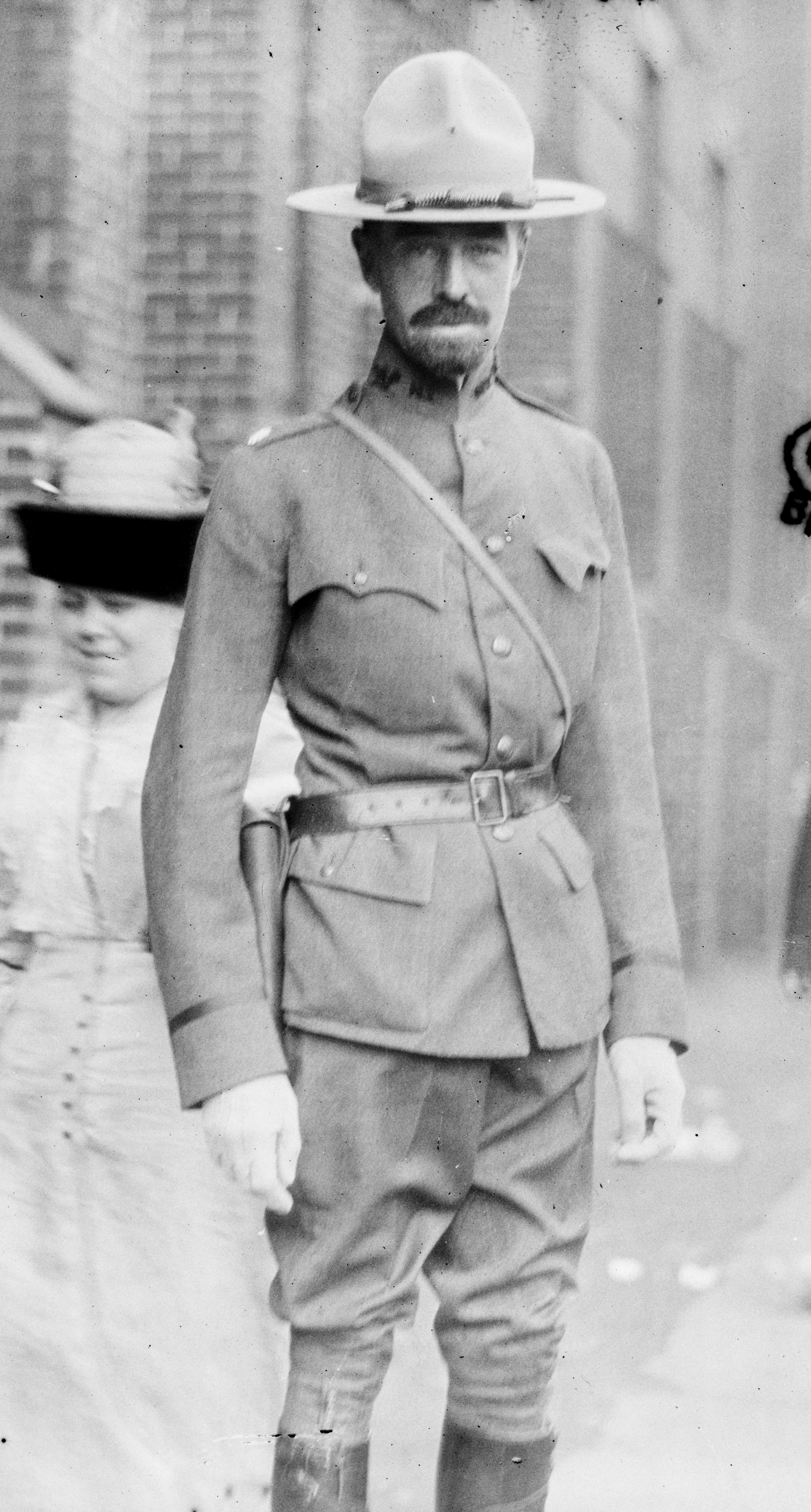

In 1901, he was commissioned a second lieutenant in the 12th Infantry Regiment of the New York National Guard and he remained a member of the National Guard for 33 years. He was promoted to first lieutenant in December 1902 and served as an aide-de-camp to the Governor of New York from September 1903 to December 1904. He was promoted to captain in June 1907 and served as an aide to the division commander from October 1908 until being promoted to lieutenant colonel and inspector general in June 1912.

Along with most of the National Guard, Vanderbilt was mobilized on 30 June 1916 and served on the Mexican border in the Pancho Villa Expedition, during the Mexican Border War.

When the United States declared war on Germany and entered World War I in April 1917. Vanderbilt was promoted to colonel on 20 July and placed in command of the 22nd Engineer Regiment of the New York National Guard. The regiment was re-designated as the 102nd Engineer Regiment on 1 October 1917 and became part of the newly organized 27th Division, which was composed of activated units of the New York National Guard. The 27th Division departed New York for Camp Wadsworth in Spartanburg, South Carolina in September 1917 and was shipped overseas to France in May and June 1918.

In July 1918, shortly after his arrival in France, Vanderbilt was promoted to brigadier general. Shortly thereafter, he returned from France to the United States and was assigned to Camp Lewis in Washington state, where he arrived on August 20 and assumed command of the 25th Brigade, which was part of the 13th Division of which he was acting commander from August 20 to September 11, 1918. As most new recruits and draftees were being sent to France to replace casualties, the 13th Division never reached full strength until November 1, 1918, which was just nine days before the armistice with Germany which ended hostilities, and, therefore, it was never sent overseas. General Vanderbilt was reassigned on December 20, 1918, and resigned his commission in the US Army on January 3, 1919.

=== Military awards ===
For his services during the war, General Vanderbilt was decorated with the Army Distinguished Service Medal by the War Department and the New York State Conspicuous Service Cross (recipient #190). He was also made a commander of the Order of the Crown of Belgium and was awarded that country's Croix de Guerre. The government of France invested him as a Commander of the Legion of Honor. He was also a recipient of the Mexican Border Service Medal and World War I Victory Medal.

His citation for the Army Distinguished Service Medal, awarded in 1919, is as follows:

The President of the United States of America, authorized by Act of Congress, July 9, 1918, takes pleasure in presenting the Army Distinguished Service Medal to Brigadier General Cornelius Vanderbilt, United States Army, for exceptionally meritorious and distinguished services to the Government of the United States, in a duty of great responsibility during World War I. As Commanding Officer, 102d Engineers, and as Engineer Officer of the 27th Division, General Vanderbilt's marked qualities of leadership and thorough training and instruction developed a high state of military efficiency in his command, as demonstrated throughout its entire service.

=== Post war service ===
After the war, Vanderbilt remained active in the New York National Guard and Organized Reserve. He commanded the 77th Infantry Division of the Organized Reserve Corps from May 1922 to January 1929, and from November 1929 until relinquishing command in January 1935.

== Postwar life ==
Following the First World War, Vanderbilt and his wife frequently returned to Europe, becoming friends and guests of numerous members of European royalty including former Kaiser Wilhelm II of Germany, and his brother, Prince Henry of Prussia, King Albert I of Belgium, Crown Prince Olav of Norway, Queen Marie of Romania, Reza Pahlavi of Iran, and every British monarch since Queen Victoria.

== Residences ==
In 1914, Vanderbilt inherited a spacious mansion located at 640 Fifth Avenue in New York City following the death of his uncle George Washington Vanderbilt II. Under the terms of the will of Vanderbilt's grandfather William Henry Vanderbilt, George had inherited a life-interest in the house, but if he did not have a son, the house would revert to the oldest son of Vanderbilt's father Cornelius Vanderbilt II.

Built in 1880 by William Henry Vanderbilt, the mansion was originally one of two sharing that block designed with identical exteriors and together known as the "Twin Mansions." It was to be his permanent residence for the rest of his life, because although he sold the mansion in 1940 to members of the Astor family, he and his family retained occupancy of the house for three years after his death in 1942. Neily's wife Grace lived there until 1944, when she moved into the William Starr Miller House at 1048 Fifth Avenue which still stands today as the Neue Galerie.

Vanderbilt also had a summer residence in Newport, Rhode Island named Beaulieu which was designed by Calvert Vaux. The mansion is located on fashionable Bellevue Avenue and is adjacent to the Marble House which was built by Vanderbilt's uncle William K. Vanderbilt. Vanderbilt's widow retained Beaulieu as her summer residence until her death, after which it was sold to Ambassador Wiley T. Buchanan, Jr. (1913-1986).

== Death ==
Brigadier General Cornelius Vanderbilt III died aboard his yacht from a cerebral hemorrhage while vacationing in Miami Beach, Florida in 1942.

Grace Vanderbilt died on January 7, 1953. She was entombed beside her husband in the Vanderbilt Family Mausoleum in New Dorp on Staten Island, New York.

== Dates of rank ==
- 2nd Lieutenant, 12th Infantry, New York National Guard - 20 September 1901
- 1st Lieutenant - 2 December 1902
- Captain - 11 June 1907
- Major - never held
- Lieutenant Colonel (Inspector General, Headquarters, New York National Guard) - 1 June 1912
- Colonel (Commanding officer, 22nd Engineers) - 4 December 1916
- Colonel (Commanding officer, 102nd Engineers), National Army - 1 October 1917
- Brigadier General, National Army - 12 July 1918
- Honorably discharged from active service - 3 January 1919

== See also ==
- Legion of Honour
- List of Legion of Honour recipients by name (V)
- List of foreign recipients of the Legion of Honour by country
- Legion of Honour Museum
