= Goelet =

Goelet is a surname, and may refer to:

- Mary Goelet (1878-1937), Duchess of Roxburghe
- Ogden Goelet (1851–1897), real estate developer
- Peter Goelet (1727–1811), American merchant and real estate developer
- Peter P. Goelet (1764–1828), his son, American merchant and real estate developer
- Robert Goelet Sr. (1809–1879), his son, real estate developer
- Robert Goelet (1841–1899), his son, real estate developer
- Robert Walton Goelet (1880–1941), his son, real estate developer
- Robert Wilson Goelet (1880–1966), American social leader, banker, and real estate developer, son of Ogden Goelet

== See also ==
- Goelet family
- George Goelet Kip (1845–1926), American lawyer
- Peter Goelet Gerry (1879–1957), American lawyer and politician
- Goelet Building (disambiguation) in New York City
