= Peithologian Society =

Literary society at Columbia University

- Founded: April 4, 1806; 219 years ago Columbia University
- Type: Literary
- Affiliation: Independent
- Status: Defunct
- Defunct date: After 1945
- Emphasis: Debate
- Scope: Local
- Motto: Vitam Impendere Vero "To devote one's life to truth"
- Colors: White
- Symbol: Star
- Chapters: 1
- Headquarters: New York City, New York; United States

The Peithologian Society was an undergraduate literary society at Columbia University. It was established in 1806 and operated until 1945.

== History ==
The Peithologian Society was founded in 1806, four years after Columbia's first literary society, the Philolexian Society, by freshmen who were disenfranchised by Philolexian's requirement that its members be upperclassmen. Its first election of members was on April 4, 1806, and included 24 freshmen.

The society's emphasis was debate, composition, and rhetoric. It had a friendly rivalry with the Philolexian Society. The two groups admitted the same number of members and, between them, included half of the students of Columbia College.

The society's debates focused on national and international contemporary issues, but some covered education, ethics, philosophy, or religion. They frequently covered slavery in the United States and Napoleon. Members also wrote and presented orations and memorized passages by notable authors. The society published literary papers, written by its members. It also had a sizeable library.

Peithologian became so popular that on July 9, 1821, Columbia's trustees resolved that "for the accommodation of the Philolexian and Peithologian Societies, a suitable building be erected...[to] advance the literary improvement of the students." This agreement brought the previously independent societies under the authority of the board of the college. Although the building was never constructed, the society was assigned rooms on campus.

Peithologian eventually dropped its freshman status and opened itself to all undergraduates. Some students, such as John Lloyd Stephens, belonged to both Peithologian and Philolexian. In general, though, the two groups maintained a rivalry that was friendly at best and highly charged at worst. In his famous diary, George Templeton Strong recorded that a Philolexian gathering was disrupted by "those rascally Peithologians"; firecrackers and stink bombs, tossed into the midst of each other's meetings, were usually the weapons of choice.

The society began to decline in 1877. Although Peithologian's alumni included such prominent names as Columbia president Nicholas Murray Butler(Class of 1882), Nobel laureate Hermann Muller (Class of 1910), and publisher Alfred A. Knopf (Class of 1912), both it and Philolexian suffered declining membership after the turn of the century. The society ceased to exist around World War I, although several undergraduates revived it after World War II.

== Symbols ==
Philo adopted light blue as its official color, while Peithologian adopted white (Columbia later appropriated the two hues as its official school colors). Peithologian's was a star. Its Latin motto was Vitam Impendere Vero or "To devote one's life to truth".

== Notable members ==
According to The Undergraduate Record published by Columbia College in 1881, former members of the society included:

- John Jacob Astor III (1839), financier, philanthropist, member of the Astor family
- William Backhouse Astor Sr. (1811), businessman, member of the Astor family, founder of the Astor Library
- Samuel Blatchford (1837), associate justice of the U.S. Supreme Court
- Charles Carow (1844), shipping magnate, father of the first lady Edith Roosevelt
- Robert L. Cutting (1830), co-founder of the Continental Bank of New York and president of the New York Stock Exchange
- Robert Goelet Sr. (1828), co-founder of the Chemical Bank of New York
- John Church Hamilton (1809), son of Alexander Hamilton
- John Jay (1836), grandson of Chief Justice John Jay; United States Minister to Austro-Hungary; president of the American Historical Association
- Benjamin T. Onderdonk (1809), Bishop of the Episcopal Diocese of New York from 1830 to 1861
- John Slidell (1810), United States Senator from Louisiana, Confederate States of America minister to France
- James Renwick Jr. (1836), Gothic Revival architect who designed St. Patrick's Cathedral, New York
- James H. Roosevelt (1819), founder of Roosevelt Hospital
- William Colford Schermerhorn (1840), lawyer, philanthropist, trustee of Columbia University
- Robert Morrison Olyphant (1842), heir to trading company Olyphant & Co. and president of the Delaware and Hudson Railway
- John Winthrop Chanler (1847), United States Congressman from New York
- Morgan Dix (1848), priest, theologian, rector of Trinity Church
- Horace Carpentier (1848), first mayor of Oakland, California and president of the Overland Telegraph Company
- Cornelius Jeremiah Vanderbilt (1850), son of Cornelius Vanderbilt
- Stewart L. Woodford (1854), Lieutenant Governor of New York and U.S. Minister to Spain
- Robert L. Cutting Jr. (1856), American banker and clubman
- Elbridge Thomas Gerry (1857), lawyer and social reformer who founded the New York Society for the Prevention of Cruelty to Children; grandson of U.S. Vice President Elbridge Gerry
- George Goelet Kip (1865), American lawyer, heir, and member of the Goelet family
- William Bayard Cutting (1869), financier, philanthropist, namesake of the Bayard Cutting Arboretum State Park
- Francis S. Bangs (1878), attorney at Bangs, Stetson, Tracy, and McVeigh and trustee of Columbia College
- Edwin Robert Anderson Seligman (1879), American economist
- William Archibald Dunning (1881), founder of the Dunning School of Reconstruction
- Reginald Sayre (1881), orthopedic surgeon and Olympic sport shooter
- Nicholas Murray Butler (1882), president of Columbia University, chairman of the Carnegie Endowment for International Peace and Nobel Peace Prize winner, founder of Horace Mann School and the College Board
- John Kendrick Bangs (1883), author, satirist, editor of Puck magazine
- Francis Lister Hawks Pott (1883), Episcopal missionary and president of St. John's University, Shanghai from 1888 to 1941

== See also ==
- List of Literary Societies
