= Robert Goelet (disambiguation) =

Robert Goelet may refer to:

- Robert Goelet Sr. (1809–1879)
- Robert Goelet (1841–1899), real estate developer
- Robert Walton Goelet (1880–1941), his son, real estate developer
- Robert Wilson Goelet (1880–1966), American social leader, banker, and real estate developer
- Robert Guestier Goelet (1923–2019), American philanthropist and executive at Chemical Bank

== See also ==
- Robert Goulet (1933–2007), American singer and actor
