= Goelet family =

Prominent American family

Goelet
- Current region: New York
- Origin: La Rochelle, France
- Connected families: Innes-Ker family Livingston family Del Ponte
- Estates: Glenmere mansion Ochre Court

The Goelet family is an influential family from New York, of Huguenot origins, that owned significant real estate in New York City.

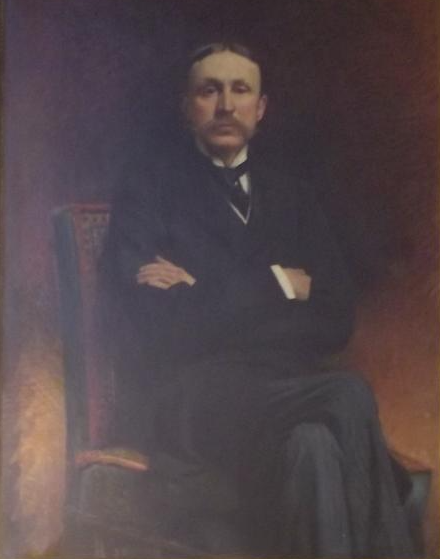
Ogden Goelet, builder of Ochre Court, Newport, Rhode Island

== History ==
The Goelets are descended from a family of Huguenots from La Rochelle in France, who escaped to Amsterdam. Francois Goelet, a widower with a ten-year-old son, Jacobus, arrived in New York in 1676. Returning to Amsterdam on business, he left the boy in the care of Frederick Philipse, but was apparently lost at sea. His son, John G. Goelet, married Jannetie Cannon, daughter of merchant Jan Cannon.

== Family tree ==
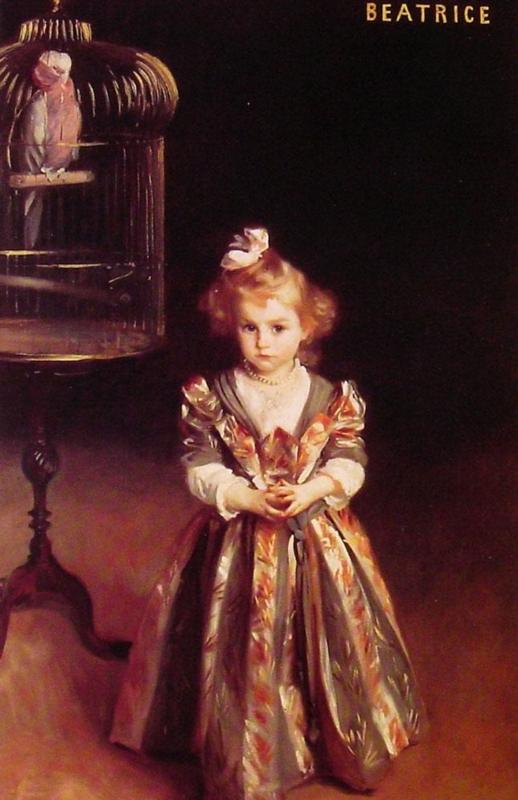
Beatrice Goelet (daughter of Robert Goelet) by John Singer Sargent, 1890

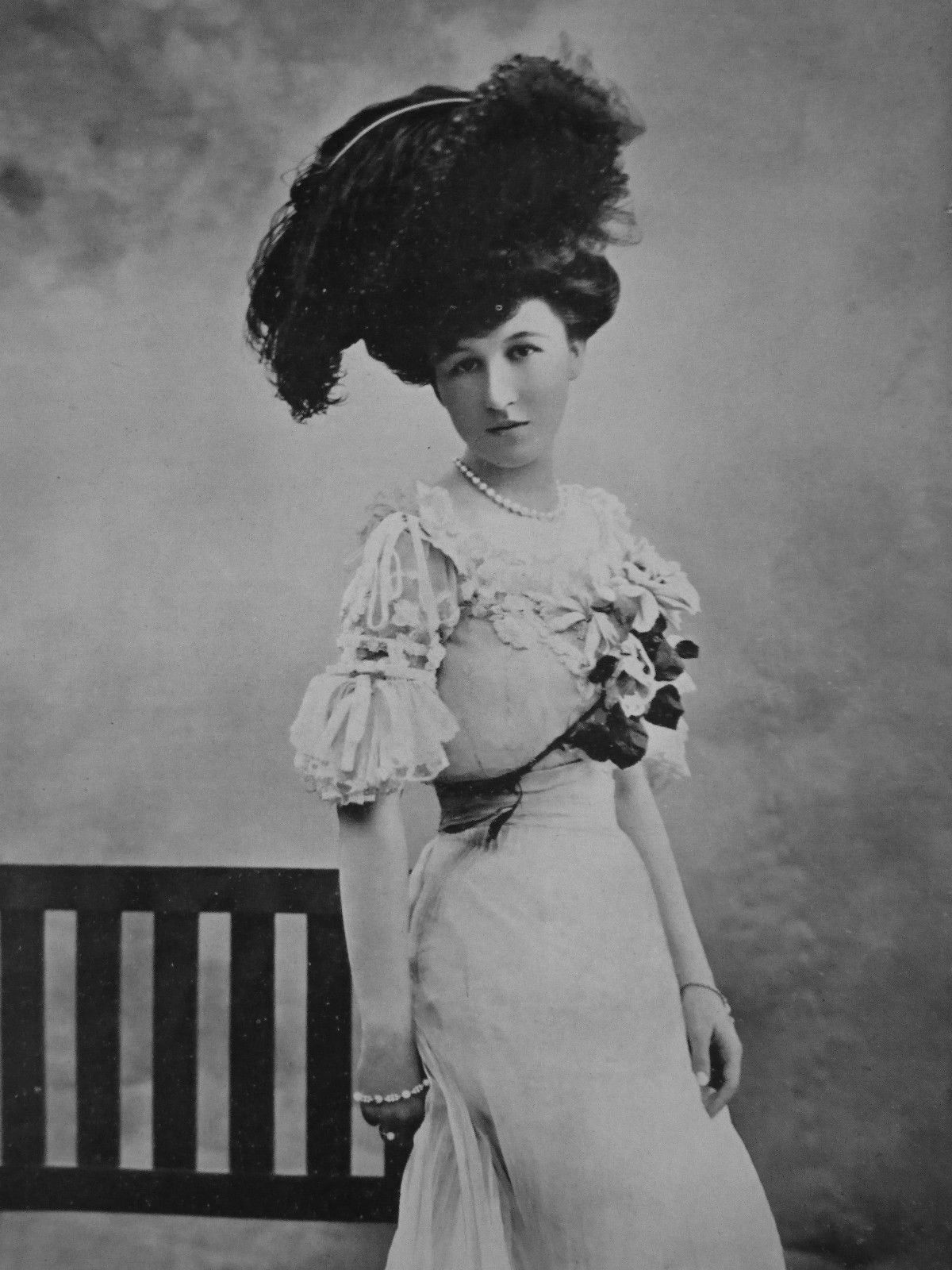
Mary Goelet, Duchess of Roxburghe, 1903

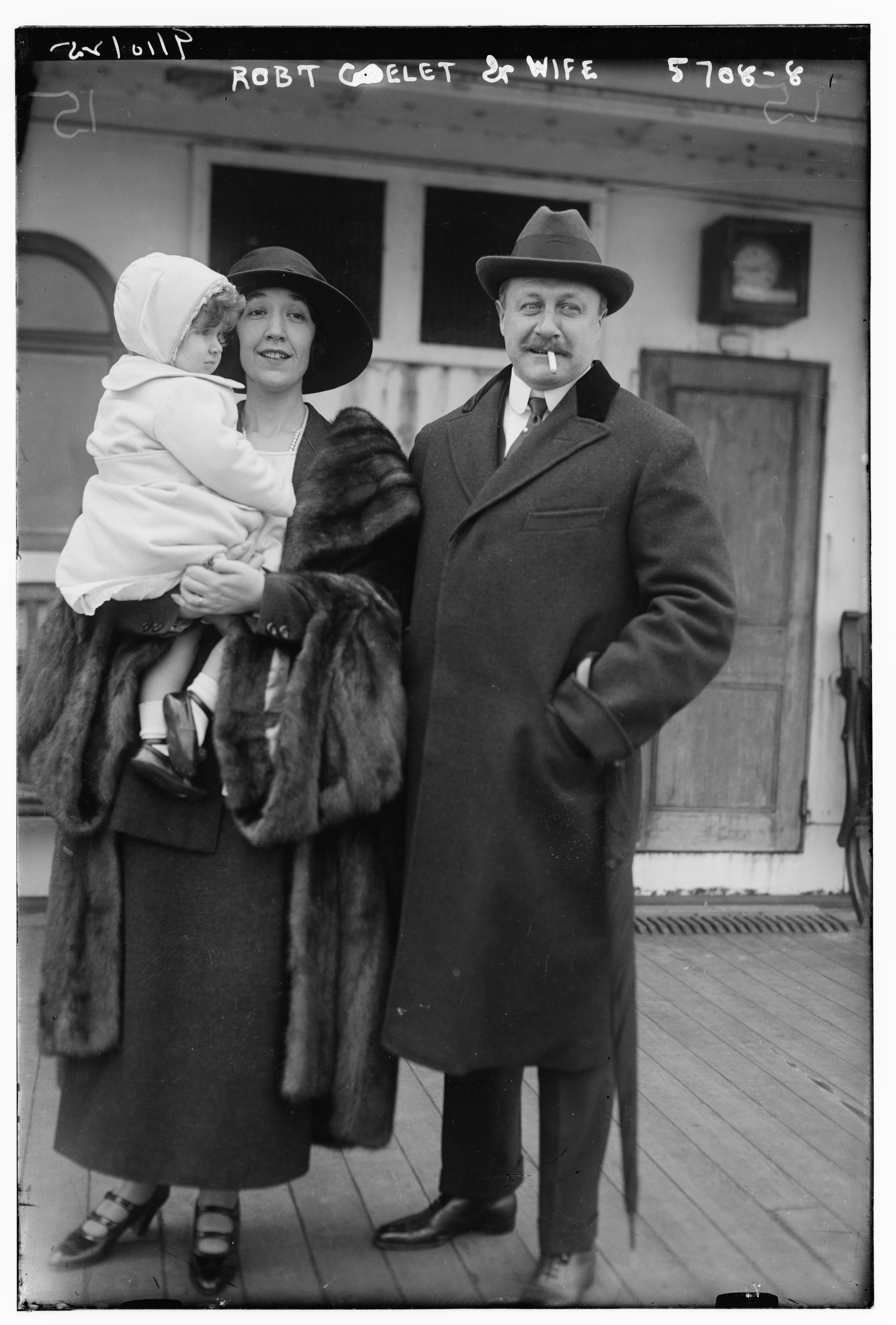
Robert Goelet with his wife.

Peter Goelet Gerry and his wife.

- Francois Goelet
  - Jacobus Goelet (1665–1731) m. Jannetje Coesaar (1665–1736)
    - John G. Goelet (1694–1753) m. Jannetje Cannon (1698–1778)
      - Catharine Goelet (d. 1806) m. 1755 Peter Theobaldus Curtenius (1734–1798)
      - Peter Goelet (1727–1811) m. Elizabeth Ratsey (1734–1769)
        - Peter P. Goelet (1764–1828) m. Almy Buchanan (1768–1848)
          - Peter Goelet (1800–1879)
          - Jean Buchanan Goelet (1802–1882)
          - Hannah Green Goelet (1804–1895) m. Thomas Russell Gerry (1794–1848)
            - Elbridge Thomas Gerry (1837–1927) m. Louisa Matilda Livingston (1836–1920)
              - Angelica Livingston Gerry (1871–1960)
              - Mabel Gerry (1872–1930) m. 1925: Francis Saxham Elwes Drury (1859–1937)
              - Robert Livingston Gerry Sr. (1877–1957) m. Cornelia Averell Harriman (1884–1966)
                - Elbridge T. Gerry II (1908–1999)
                - Robert Livingston Gerry Jr. (1911–1979) m. Martha Leighton Kramer
                  - Robert Livingston Gerry III (1937–2023)
                - Edward Harriman Gerry (1914–2003) m. Martha Farish (1918–2007)
                - Henry Averell Gerry (1914–2000)
              - Peter Goelet Gerry (1879–1957) m. (1) 1910 (div. 1925): Mathilde Townsend m. (2) Edith Stuyvesant Dresser Vanderbilt (1873–1958)
          - Robert Goelet Sr. (1809–1879) m. Sarah Ogden (1813–1888)
            - Robert Goelet (1841–1899) m. Harriette Louise Warren (1854 - 1912)
              - Robert Walton Goelet (1880–1941) m. Anne Marie Guestier (1899-1988)
                - Beatrice Goelet (1922–2015) m. 1948: Hayward Ferry Manice
                - Robert Guestier Goelet (1924–2019) m. 1976 Alexandra Creel (b. 1940)
                - Francis Goelet (1926–1998)
                - John Goelet
              - Beatrice Goelet (1885–1902)
            - Ogden Goelet (1846–1897) m. Mary Rita Wilson (1855–1929)
              - Mary Goelet (1878–1937) m. 1903: Henry Innes-Ker, 8th Duke of Roxburghe (1876–1932)
                - George Victor Robert John Innes-Ker, 9th Duke of Roxburghe (1913–1974) m. (1) 1935 (div. 1953): Mary Evelyn Hungerford Crewe-Milnes (1915–2014) m. (2) 1954: Margaret Elizabeth McConnel
                  - Guy David Innes-Ker, 10th Duke of Roxburghe (1954–2019)
                    - Charles Innes-Ker, 11th Duke of Roxburghe (b. 1981)
                  - Lord Robert Anthony Innes-Ker (b. 1959) m. 1996: Katherine Pelly
              - Robert Wilson Goelet (1880–1966) m. (1) 1904 (div. 1914): Marie Elise Whelen Clews (1880–1959) m. (2) 1919 (div. 1924): Donna Fernanda di Villa Rosa (1885–1982) m. (3) 1925: Roberta Willard (1891–1949)
                - Ogden Goelet (1907–1969) m. Maria Virginia Zimbalist (1915–1981) m. Florence Enid Matthew (1912–1992) m. (5) Sara Sherburne Haigh (1908–1989)
                  - Ogden Goelet
                  - Enid Goelet (1934–2005) m. Ranald T. McNeil (1933–2013)
                - Peter Goelet (1911–1986)
                - Robert Walton Goelet Jr. (1921–1989) m. (1) Jane Potter Monroe (1920–1999) m. (2) 1949 (div. 1956): Lynn Merrick (1919–2007)
                - Mary Eleanor Goelet (b. 1927) m. (1) 1949 (div.): James Eliot Cross (1921–1997)
                  - Eliot Goelet Cross (b. 1952)
        - Robert Ratsey Goelet (1769–1824) m. Margaret Buchanan (1769–1848)
          - Elizabeth Goelet (1808–1882) m. Elbert Samuel Kip (1799–1876)
            - George Goelet Kip (1845–1926) m. Anna Margaret Geissenhainer (1847-1893)
              - Charles Augustus Kip (1870–1940) m. Marie Gilmour Bryce (1878–1940)
              - Elbert Samuel Kip (1874–1950) m. Alice Alden Bushnell (1872–1952)
                - Elbert Bushnell Kip (1901–1975) m. Doris Frederica Pantaenius (1904–1983)
                - Hendrik Kip (1906–1970) m. (1) Virginia Hastings (1909–1991) m. (2) Juliana Soule (1912–1969)
                - Josephine Alden Kip (1909–1978) m. Sherburn Edward Edgerly (1910–1962)
              - Anna Elizabeth Kip (1880–1918) m. A. Paul Olmsted (1882–1948)
            - Margaret Goelet Kip (1847–1854)
        - Jannetje Goelet (1758–1840) m. Robert Troup (1757–1832)
          - Charlotte Troup (1792–1872) m. James Lefferts Brinckerhoff (1791–1846)
            - Maria Louisa Brinckerhoff (1816–1866) m. 1836: Robert Livingston Pell (1811–1880)
            - Charlotte Brinckerhoff (1818–1861) m. Frederic Bronson (1802–1868)
              - Frederic Bronson (1851–1900) m. Sarah Gracie King (1850–1931)
                - Elizabeth Duer Bronson (1877–1914) m. Lloyd Carpenter Griscom (1872–1959)
        - John Goelet (1759–1853) m. Eliza Taylor Buncombe (1766–1840) (daughter of Edward Buncombe)
        - Elizabeth Goelet (1766–1856) m. William Cornelius Bucknor.
          - William Goelet Bucknor (1798–1852) m. Emily Beelow
            - Cornelia Bucknor (1838–1914) m. John Howard Van Amringe (1835–1915)
              - Guy Van Amringe (1869–1936)

== See also ==
- Duke of Roxburghe
- Glenmere mansion
- Livingston family
- Ochre Court
