= John Lockman =

John Lockman may refer to:

- John Lockman (author), English author
- John Lockman (priest), Canon of Windsor
- John Thomas Lockman, American lawyer and Union Army soldier
