= Ancrum House =

Coordinates: 42°14′43″N 74°49′17″W

Ancrum House was a Georgian-style manor house constructed from 1925 to 1928 in Delhi, Delaware County, New York. The house was constructed for Angelica Livingstone Gerry (1871–1960) by the firm Cram & Ferguson (managed by Ralph Adams Cram and Frank W. Ferguson). Antrum House (demolished in 1963) is historically noteworthy for its formal gardens, designed by the famous landscape architect Fletcher Steele.

Angelica Livingston Gerry was a great-granddaughter of Elbridge Gerry, a signer of the United States Declaration of Independence and the 5th Vice President of the United States. Angelica Gerry's parents were Elbridge T. and Louisa Gerry. In 1867, Elbridge Thomas Gerry (1837–1927) married Louisa Matilda Livingston (1836–1920), who was immensely wealthy. Angelica Gerry was also a great-granddaughter of Morgan Lewis — Morgan Lewis was the governor of New York state from 1804 to 1807 and the 2nd son of Francis Lewis, a signer of the U.S. Declaration of Independence. Through family inheritance originating from Robert Livingston the Elder and his son Robert Livingston the Younger and eventually (in 1867) handed down to the Gerry family, Morgan Lewis and his wife Gertrude (née Livingston) received almost 20,000 acres and in 1820 had their mansion built in the Catskills next to a mountain lake. They named their newly built estate "Lake Delaware". From the marriage of Elbridge T. and Louisa Gerry, there were two sons, Robert Livingston Gerry Sr. and Peter Goelet Gerry, and four daughters — Angelica, Mabel (1872–1930), and two who died young. As part of her share of the Gerry inheritance, Angelica Gerry received a 200-acre parcel of land.

Angelica Gerry named her inherited land "Ancrum" in honor of the Scottish village Ancrum, where her ancestor Robert Livingston the Elder was born. In 1925, she hired Fletcher Steele to design the formal gardens for Ancrum House. The project became the largest of his career. His work on the project extended, with many interruptions, over twenty-three years. He produced over 500 plans and drawings for the project. She was a client and a patron, but not really a friend or a partner in the design work. The extensive correspondence between them contains issues of finance and rarely of aesthetics. Steele designed a huge garden, divided into several areas, with long shady walks, interrupted by a few open sunny areas, with flowers surrounded by simple borders. There were several outdoor rooms and garden walks with extensive views. He called the garden's main diagonal axis the "Overland Walk". He designated some of the other areas as the "West Garden", the "Flower Garden", and the "Lilac Garden". The Flower Garden had geometric patterns and converging walks inspired by 17th century garden design, but the rest of Antrum House's gardens were more in the Georgian style. The garden landscape had a pergola and a nut orchard. Steele directed the creation of borders with mountain ashes (rowans), hemlock trees (Tsuga), and lilacs (Syringa vulgaris). Angelica Gerry selected, independently of Steele, many of the architectural and statuary elements of the formal gardens. She never married. Until her death in 1960, Angelica Gerry enjoyed furnishing Ancium House, tending to the gardens, and growing her prized delphiniums.

In the 1961, an auction sold much of Ancrum House's art and furniture. In 1963, after a dispute over property taxes, the house was razed.
