= Thomas Russell Gerry =

American sailor

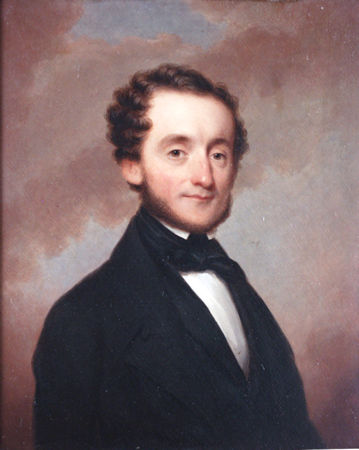
- Born: December 8, 1794; Cambridge, Massachusetts, U.S.
- Died: October 8, 1845 (aged 50); New Rochelle, New York, U.S.
- Spouse: Hannah Green Goelet (m. 1830; died 1845)
- Children: 2, including Elbridge Thomas Gerry
- Parent(s): Elbridge Gerry; Ann Thompson
- Relatives: Robert Livingston Gerry (grandson); Peter Goelet Gerry (grandson)

Thomas Russell Gerry (December 8, 1794 – October 8, 1845) was an American sailor who was active in the Sons of the American Revolution and was a son of the fifth U.S. Vice President Elbridge Gerry.

== Early life ==
Gerry was born on December 8, 1794, in Cambridge, Massachusetts. He was one of ten children born to Elbridge Gerry (1744–1814), a Founding Father, Massachusetts Governor and U.S. Vice President, and Ann (née Thompson) Gerry (1763–1849), who was near twenty years his father's junior. At his parents' wedding, his father's best man was his good friend James Monroe.

His maternal grandparents were James Thompson, a wealthy Irish-born New York merchant, and Catharine (née Walton) Thompson. His paternal grandparents were Thomas Gerry (1702–1774), a merchant who operated ships out of Marblehead, and Elizabeth (née Greenleaf) Gerry (1716–1771), the daughter of a successful Boston merchant.

== Career ==
On December 6, 1814, Gerry was appointed and served as a midshipman in the United States Navy. His brother, James Thompson Gerry (1797–1854), was commander of the USS Albany, a United States Navy war sloop, when it was sunk on September 28, 1854. In November 1818, his mother Ann wrote to Smith Thompson, Secretary of the Navy, soliciting his promotion and expressing thanks for the promotion of his elder brother, Elbridge Gerry Jr. (1793–1867) In February 1822, his brother Elbridge also wrote to the Secretary of the Navy recommending his Thomas' promotion to Lieutenant.

On January 13, 1825, Gerry was promoted to lieutenant. Gerry resigned from the Navy as a lieutenant on August 27, 1833, a few years after his marriage.

== Personal life ==
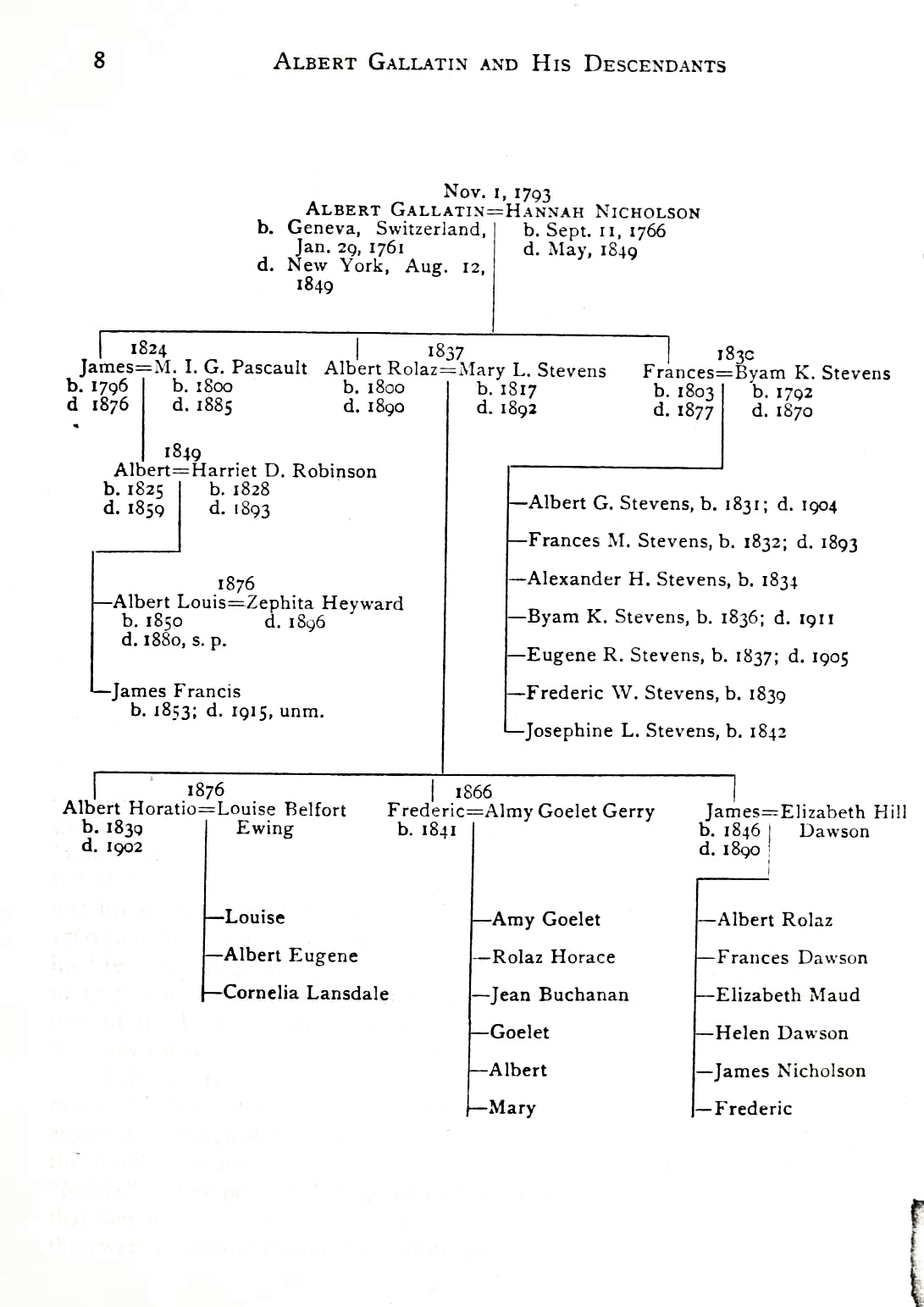
Ancestry of son-in-law Federic Gallatin, compiled from Life of Albert Gallatin, by Henry Adams, 1879, History of Nicholson family, by Byam Kerby Stevens, 1911, and other sources, revised by Colonel William Plumb Bacon. Published 1916 by Press of T.A. Wright in New York, N.Y.

On June 30, 1830, Gerry was married to Hannah Green Goelet (1804–1845), the daughter of merchant Peter P. Goelet and Almy (née Buchanan) Goelet. She was the aunt of Robert Goelet, a businessman and yachtsman, and the granddaughter of Peter Goelet, a merchant and real estate developer. Her brother, Peter Goelet, left part of his vast estate to their son Elbridge upon his death in 1879. Together, they were the parents of:

- Elbridge Thomas Gerry (1837–1927), who married Louisa Matilda Livingston (1836–1920), granddaughter of Maturin Livingston, in 1867.
- Almy Goelet Gerry (1840–1917), who married Federic Gallatin (1841–1927), a grandson of Secretary of the Treasury Albert Gallatin and cousin of Albert Eugene Gallatin, in 1866.

Gerry died on October 8, 1845, in New Rochelle, New York. At the time of his death, his children were very young and had to be raised by their mother.

=== Descendants ===
Through his son Elbridge, he was the grandfather of Angelica Livingston Gerry (1871–1960), who died unmarried; Mabel Gerry (1872–1930), who married Francis Saxham Elwes Drury (1859–1937); Robert Livingston Gerry, Sr. (1877–1957), who married Cornelia Averell Harriman (1884–1966), the second daughter of railroad executive E. H. Harriman and his wife Mary Williamson Averell; and Peter Goelet Gerry (1879–1957), U.S. Representative and Senator from Rhode Island, who was married to Mathilde Townsend and, later, Edith Stuyvesant Dresser (1873–1958), the widow of George Washington Vanderbilt II (1862–1914).

Through his daughter Almy, he was the grandfather of Almy Goelet "Amy" Gallatin (1868–1935), who married Howland Pell (1856–1937); Rolaz Horace Gallatin (1871–1948), who married Emily Lorillard Morris (b. 1873); Jean Buchanan Gallatin (b. 1873), who married George Philip Cammann (1861–1920); Goelet Gallatin (1877–1962), who married Edith Church Post (b. 1882), a step-sister of Regis Henri Post; Albert Gallatin (b. 1880); and Mary "May" Gallatin (1882–1944), who married William Warner Hoppin Jr. (1878–1948), a grandson of Gov. William Warner Hoppin, in 1902.
