= Goelet Building =

The Goelet Building may refer to any of the following buildings in Manhattan, New York:

- 608 Fifth Avenue (Swiss Center Building) at 49th Street
- 900 Broadway at 20th Street
- Judge Building, originally the Goelet Building, at 110 Fifth Avenue and 16th Street
