= Robert Goelet Sr. =

American businessman

Robert Goelet
- Born: September 19, 1809; New York City, New York, U.S.
- Died: September 22, 1879 (aged 70); New York City, New York, U.S.
- Education: Columbia College
- Spouse: Sarah Ogden (m. 1839)
- Children: Robert Goelet; Helen Goelet; Ogden Goelet
- Parent(s): Peter P. Goelet; Almy Buchanan Goelet
- Relatives: See Goelet family

Robert Goelet Sr. (September 19, 1809 – September 22, 1879) was an American businessman and co-founder of the Chemical Bank of New York.

== Early life ==
Goelet was born on September 19, 1809, to "one of the oldest and most respected [families] in the City." He was the youngest of four children born to Almy (née Buchanan) Goelet (1768–1848) and Peter P. Goelet (1764–1828). His siblings were Peter Goelet, who was named after their grandfather Peter Goelet; Jean Buchanan Goelet; and Hannah Green Goelet, who married Thomas Russell Gerry, son of U.S. Vice President Elbridge Gerry and parents to Elbridge Thomas Gerry. His father, a hardware merchant based at 48 Hanover Square (later known as 113 and 115 Pearl Streets), was a large land-owner, including the "Goelet farm" which Robert's elder brother Peter inherited at Broadway and 19th Street.

His maternal grandparents were Almy (née Townsend) Buchanan and Thomas Buchanan, a merchant with Thomas Buchanan & Son at 44 Wall Street. Goelet's maternal aunt, Margaret Buchanan, was married to his paternal uncle, Robert Ratsey Goelet. His paternal grandparents were Elizabeth (née Ratsey) Goelet and Peter Goelet, a prominent merchant and landowner who was a descendant of Huguenots from La Rochelle in France, who escaped to Amsterdam. During the Revolutionary War, his grandfather was a member of the Sons of Liberty, the Committee of Correspondence, and the Committee of One Hundred.

He graduated from Columbia College in 1828.

== Career ==
Goelet was a prominent landowner and landlord in New York and generally followed his brothers real estate rule, which was to "never to part with a foot of land the title of which had been once vested in the Goelet family."

Robert, along with his brother, were instrumental in founding the Chemical Bank and Trust Company. While neither of them were directors (Robert's son Robert became a director in 1878), both Robert and Peter were among the largest stockholders of the bank when it was rechartered as a state bank in 1844. Today, through various mergers, the bank is known as JPMorgan Chase.

== Personal life ==
On October 16, 1839, Goelet was married to Sarah Ogden (1809–1888), a daughter of Jonathan Ogden and Charlotte Eliza (née Walton) Ogden. Together, they lived at 5 State Street in Manhattan, overlooking the Battery and were the parents of:

- Robert Goelet (1841–1899) who married Harriette Louise Warren (1854–1912), sister of George H., Whitney and Lloyd Warren, in April 1879.
- Helen Goelet (1843–1844), who died in infancy.
- Ogden Goelet (1851–1897), who married Mary Rita Wilson (1855–1929), daughter of Richard Thornton Wilson.

Goelet died on September 22, 1879, at 857 Broadway, his residence in New York City. After a funeral at St. Mark's Protestant Episcopal Church, he was buried in the Ogden family vault at the New York Marble Cemetery. In his will, he left his wife "all his jewelry, plate, ornaments, horses, carriages, furniture, and paintings, and an annuity of $40,000 in lieu of dower, payable in quarterly installments." The remainder of his estate, which in total was estimated at from $6,000,000 to $10,000,000, was left to his two sons in "equal shares." Two months after Robert's death, his brother Peter, who never married and was known for his many eccentricities, also died. Aside from $500,000 left to his nephew Elbridge Gerry, the rest of Peter's estate went to Robert's sons.

=== Descendants ===
Through his eldest son Robert, he was a grandfather of Robert Walton Goelet, a financier and real estate developer, and Beatrice Goelet, who died of pneumonia at age 17 in 1902 and was painted as a child by John Singer Sargent.

Through his son Ogden, he was a grandfather of Mary Goelet, the wife of Henry Innes-Ker, 8th Duke of Roxburghe, and Robert Wilson Goelet, the original owner of Glenmere mansion.
