= Judge Building =

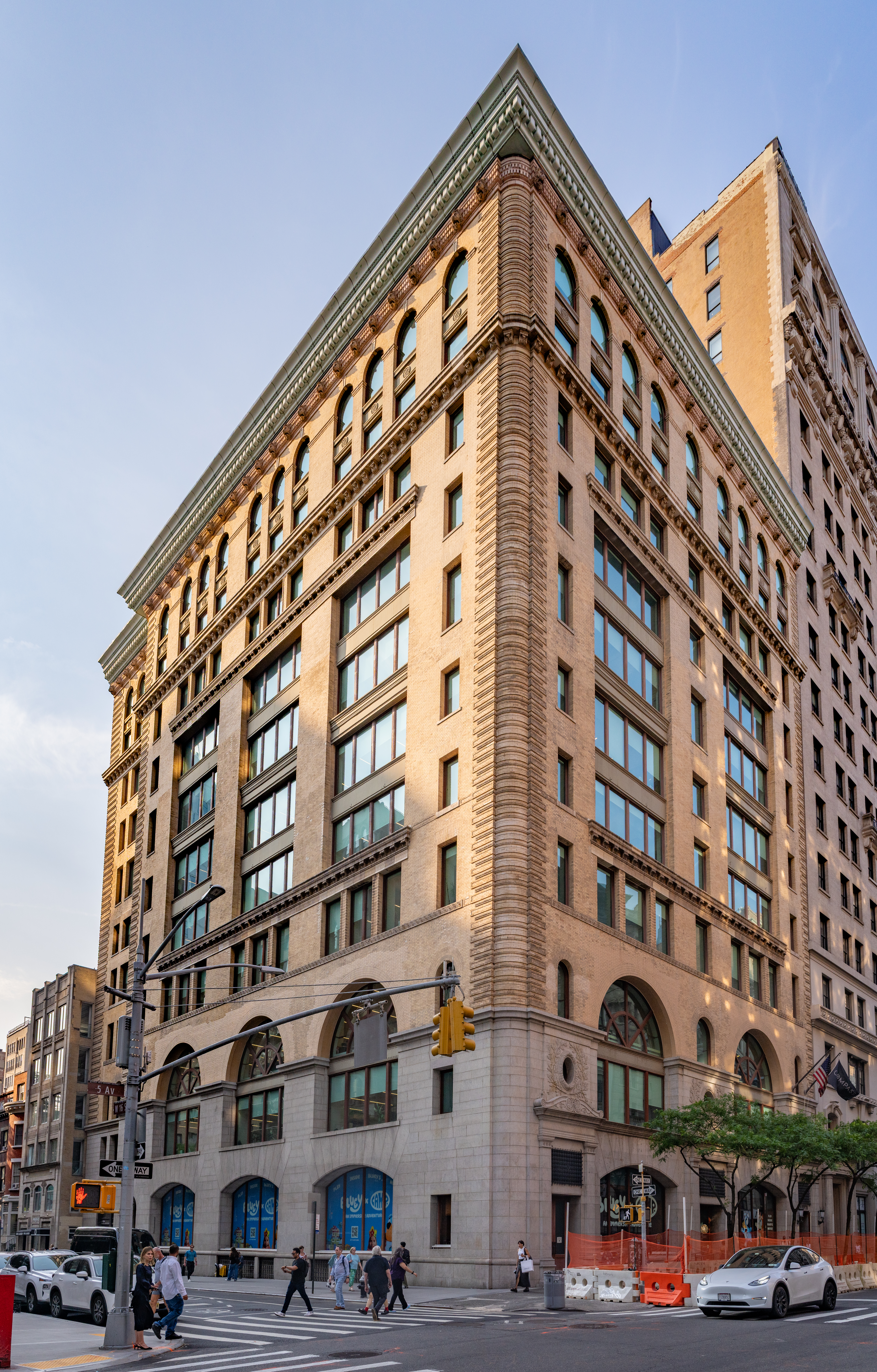
- (2025)
- Former names: Goelet Building

General information
- Location: 110 Fifth Avenue; Manhattan, New York City, New York
- Coordinates: 40°44′15″N 73°59′34″W
- Completed: 1888

Height
- Height: 147 feet (45 m)

Technical details
- Floor count: 10

Design and construction
- Architect: McKim, Mead & White

The Judge Building, originally the Goelet Building, is a ten-story edifice built in 1888 at 110 Fifth Avenue and 16th Street in the Flatiron District of Manhattan, New York City. It is named after Judge magazine, which was printed there. It covers a site measuring 92 by 158.4 feet (28.0 by 48.3 m). It was designed by McKim, Mead, and White. The building was acquired by the New York Times Company in 1985, upon which it became occupied mostly by the Times Company magazine, Family Circle.

== History ==
The property was owned by the Goelet family. In May 1922, Mary R. and Robert Goelet obtained a $250,000 loan on the establishment from the Union Dime Savings Bank.

In 1889 the Judge Building was expanded at the expense of a piano warehouse owned by William Knabe & Company at 112 Fifth Avenue. After May 1, 1889, the warehouse was absorbed by the newer structure.

An exhibition of three thousand dolls was put on at the Judge Building beginning on the night of December 15, 1890. It was the first of its kind in the United States and featured a large Albani doll sent from London by Mademoiselle Albani.

From an historic or cultural point of view, the most famous tenant of the Judge Building (top floor) was probably Gianni Bettini (1860-1938). He introduced (and soon sold) serious musical recording selections by the early 1890s, especially in the field of opera and politics - and possessed examples by Sarah Bernhardt and Mark Twain. He was also a prolific inventor, with many patents to his credit, both US and foreign. He also had commercial connections with the major sound recording companies of the time, such as Edison (National), Columbia, and Norcross; he maintained an extensive network of advertising and supply around the World, in machines, accessories, and records. However, his niche business of catering to the "carriage trade" was essentially ended by the development of "gold-moulding" in 1902 - the mass production of cylinder records.

Former business establishments also located in the Judge Building included the firm of Sackett, Wilhelms & Company (Sackett-Wilhelms Lithographing & Publishing Company), which had a printing press there in 1891.

In the mid-1980s the New York Historic Districts Council replaced a rotted out cornice made of light-gauge metal sheets with one composed of molded fiberglass. The new cornice projected from the top of the building in a stepped design, with ornamental blocks (dentils) arranged in a prominent row. The original third floor arches were also rebuilt. The arches were lost in 1903, a year in which three floors were added to the structure.
