= Felix Hebert =

American politician (1874–1969)

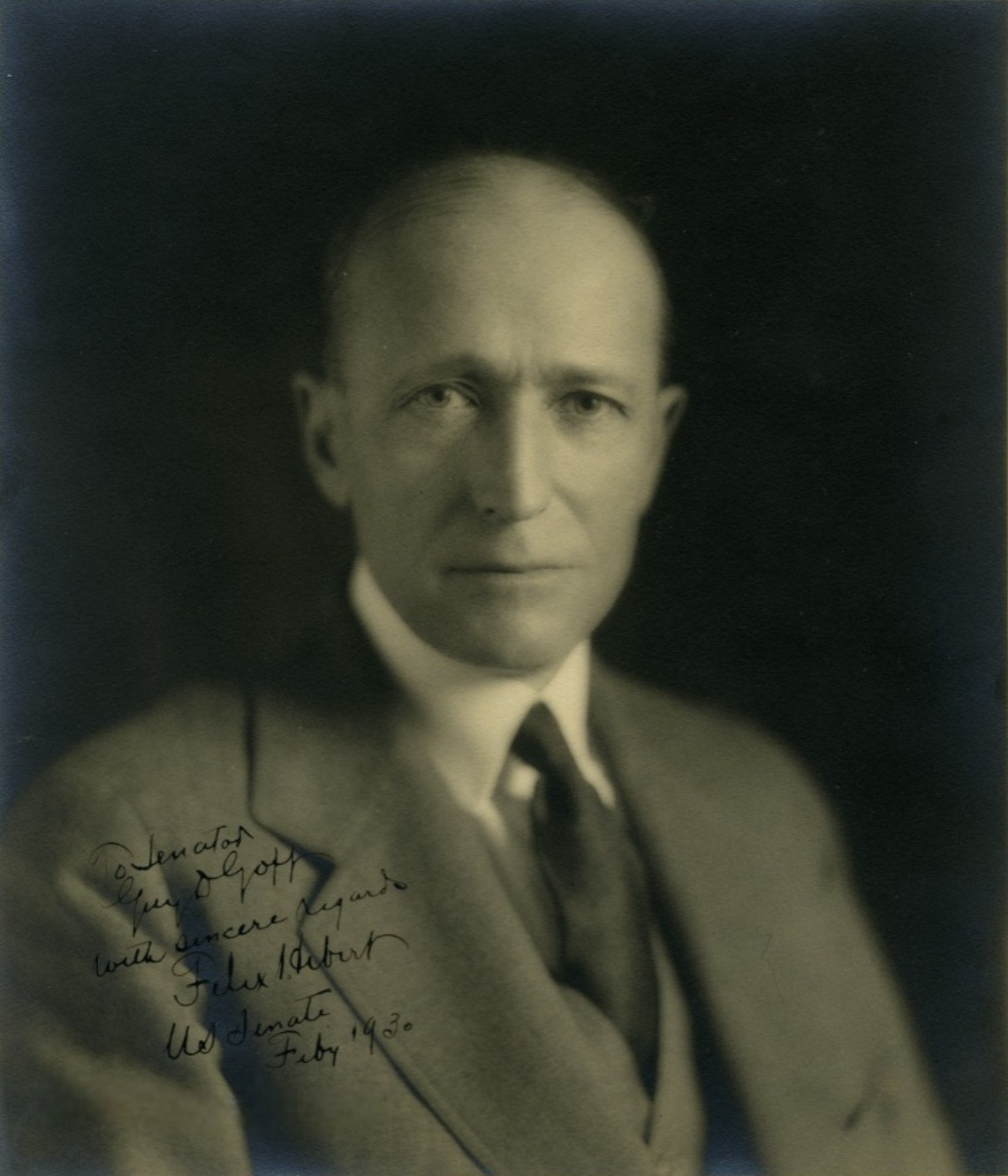
- Hebert in 1930

Senate Minority Whip
- In office March 4, 1933 – January 3, 1935
- Leader: Charles L. McNary
- Preceded by: Morris Sheppard
- Succeeded by: Kenneth S. Wherry (1944)

United States Senator from Rhode Island
- In office March 4, 1929 – January 3, 1935
- Preceded by: Peter G. Gerry
- Succeeded by: Peter G. Gerry

Personal details
- Born: December 11, 1874 St-Hyacinthe, Canada
- Died: December 14, 1969 (aged 95) Warwick, Rhode Island, U.S.
- Party: Republican
- Spouse: Virginia Provost

Felix Hebert (December 11, 1874 – December 14, 1969) was a United States senator from Rhode Island. Born near St-Hyacinthe, Quebec, Canada, he came to the United States when his parents, Edouard and Catherine (née Vandale) Hebert, returned in 1880 and resumed their residence in the town of Coventry, Rhode Island. He was the first person of French-Canadian ancestry to serve in the United States Senate.

== Early life, education, and career ==
Born in St. Guillaume, Quebec, where his parents were visiting to tend to his father Edouard's health, the family returned to Coventry, where Hebert was educated in public schools. He then attended La Salle Academy in Providence, from which he graduated in 1893. He was employed as a railroad freight billing clerk from 1893 to 1896 and as a private secretary to Gen. Charles R. Brayton from 1896 to 1898. He received an appointment as clerk in the office of Treasurer Walter A. Read, where he worked for one year. He was deputy insurance commissioner of Rhode Island from 1898 to 1906, studied law, was admitted to the bar in 1907 and commenced practice in Providence.

== Judicial and political service ==
He was justice of the district court of the fourth judicial district of Rhode Island from 1908 to 1928, trustee of the Nathanael Greene Homestead Association of Rhode Island from 1924 to 1934, and a member and secretary of the Providence County Courthouse Commission from 1925 to 1934.

Hebert was elected as a Republican to the U.S. Senate, unseating Democrat Peter G. Gerry by a 51% to 49% margin. He served from March 4, 1929, to January 3, 1935; he was an unsuccessful candidate for reelection in 1934, losing a rematch to Gerry, who won 57% of the vote. In 1931, he travelled to Europe to examine European unemployment compensation systems, returning to the U.S. to advise President Herbert Hoover against federal unemployment compensation. While in the Senate, he was Republican whip from 1933 to 1935, and chairman of the Committee on Patents (Seventy-second Congress). He resumed the practice of law, was a member of the Republican National Committee from 1944 to 1952, and was advisory counsel to the Associated Factory Mutual Fire Insurance Companies. He was considered an "international authority on insurance law". He died in Warwick in 1969; interment was in St. Joseph's Cemetery, West Warwick.

== Personal life ==
Hebert had thirteen siblings including Rev. Mathias A. Hebert, who on December 16, 1922, was appointed by Bishop William A. Hickey as the second pastor of St. Cecilia Parish of Pawtucket, Rhode Island. Hebert was a Roman Catholic and was a member of the parish of St. Jean Baptiste, Arctic Centre, of which his father was one of the founders. He was a member of various societies and clubs, including the Catholic Club, and the Turk's Head Club of Providence.

On September 18, 1900, in Ware, Massachusetts, Hebert married Virginia M. Provost (1875 – 1958), a daughter of Jean Octave Provost (1852 – 1929) and Virginie (née Deslauriers) Provost (d. 1878). Felix and Virginia Hebert had four children: Catherine Virginia, Adrien Warner, Marguerite Rosalie, and Edouard Felix.

Party political offices
Preceded by Robert Livingston Beeckman	Republican nominee for U.S. Senator from Rhode Island (Class 1); 1928, 1934	Succeeded by James O. McManus
Preceded by Simeon D. Fess	Senate Republican Whip; 1933–1935	Succeeded by Kenneth S. Wherry
U.S. Senate
Preceded by Peter G. Gerry	U.S. Senator (Class 1) from Rhode Island; 1929–1935; Served alongside: Jesse H. Metcalf	Succeeded by Peter G. Gerry
Preceded by Charles W. Waterman	Chair of the Senate Patents Committee; 1932–1933	Succeeded by Robert F. Wagner
Preceded by Morris Sheppard	Senate Minority Whip; 1933–1935	Vacant Title next held by Kenneth S. Wherry
