= Peter P. Goelet =

American merchant and real estate investor

- Born: August 18, 1764; New York City, Province of New York, British America
- Died: October 23, 1828 (aged 64); New York City, United States
- Spouse: Almy Buchanan (after 1799)
- Children: 4, including Robert
- Parent(s): Peter Goelet; Elizabeth Ratse
- Relatives: Robert Goelet (grandson); Ogden Goelet (grandson); Elbridge Thomas Gerry (grandson)

Peter P. Goelet (August 18, 1764 – October 23, 1828), was an American merchant and real estate investor.

== Early life ==
Goelet was born on August 18, 1764, in New York City. He was the second son of Peter Goelet (1727–1811) and, his first wife, Elizabeth Ratse (1734–1769). His siblings were Alice Goelet, Jannetje Goelet (wife of Lt. Colonel Robert Troup), John Goelet (who married Eliza Taylor Buncombe, a daughter of Edward Buncombe), and Elizabeth Goelet (wife of William Cornelius Bucknor), and Robert Ratse Goelet.

He was descended from a family of Huguenots of La Rochelle in France who, due to the Edict of Nantes, escaped in 1621 to Amsterdam. His paternal great-grandfather, Jacobus Goelet, was ten years old when he arrived in New York in 1676 with his widowed father, François "Francis" Goelet. Francis returned to Amsterdam on business, and left Jacobus in the care of Frederick Philipse (who became 1st Lord of Philipsburg Manor in 1693), but was lost at sea before his return. His grandfather was one of six children born to Jacobus Goelet and Jannetje (née Cossart) Goelet (daughter of Dutch-born Jacques Jacob Cossart).

== Career ==
Goelet was a merchant with offices at 65 Water Street in Manhattan. He was also a member of the Western Inland Dock Navigation Company. In addition, he inherited considerable real estate and other property which he added to through his lifetime, including from his marriage.

Goelet served as a director of many companies in New York, including the Columbian Insurance Company. In May 1815, he was chosen among other stockholders as a director of the Bank of New-York. In January 1828, he was elected as a director of the Eagle Fire Company of New York. Goelet also served as a trustee of the New York Lying-In Hospital.

== Personal life ==
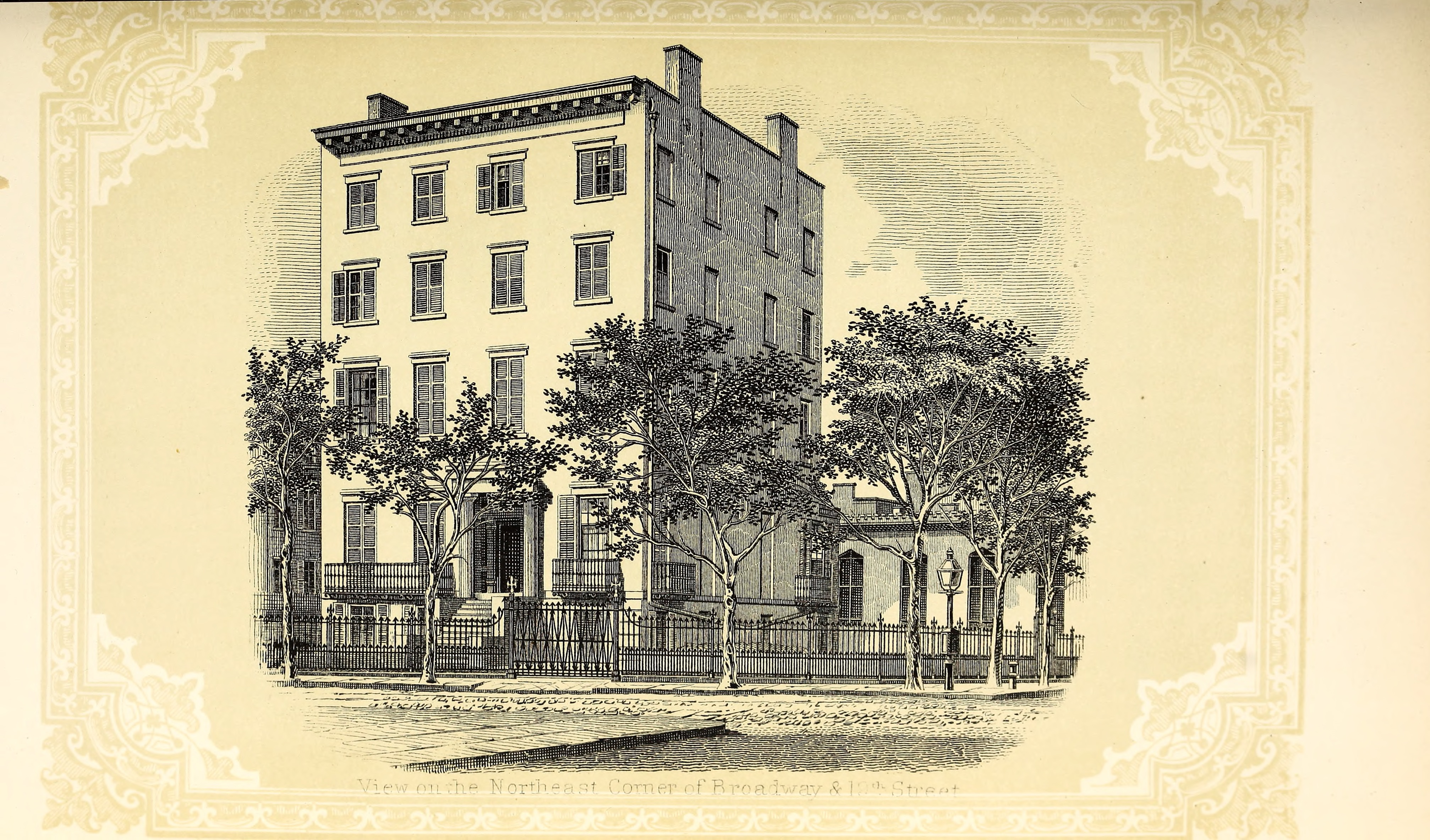
His eldest son's mansion on the northeast corner of Broadway and 19th Street, 1870

In 1799, Goelet married Almy Buchanan (1768–1848) at the Buchanan mansion on Wall Street. She was a daughter of Scottish-born merchant and director of the United States Bank, Thomas Buchanan. Buchanan, a member of the Committee of One Hundred, had a 13-acre farm surrounding 45th Street and Third Avenue where he grew turnips, corn and potatoes. His brother Robert Ratse Goelet married Almy's sister, Margaret Buchanan. Together, they were the parents of:

- Peter Goelet (1800–1879), who lived, for a time, with his sister Hannah in a mansion on the northeast corner of Broadway and 19th Street, which grounds were known for peacocks, storks, and other exotic birds.
- Jean Buchanan Goelet (1802–1882), who never married.
- Hannah Green Goelet (1806–1895), who married Capt. Thomas Russell Gerry, a son of U.S. Vice President Elbridge Gerry.
- Robert Goelet (1809–1879), who married Sarah Ogden, a daughter of Jonathan Ogden.

Goelet died in New York City on October 23, 1828. He was buried in the churchyard of St. Mark's Church in-the-Bowery in Manhattan.

=== Descendants ===
Coat of Arms of Peter Goelet

Through his youngest son Robert, he was a grandfather of Robert Goelet and Ogden Goelet, who were both prominent in New York and grew the Goelet family wealth further. His brother's grandson, George Goelet Kip, was also a prominent landowner in Manhattan and a business associate of his cousins Robert and Ogden.

Through his daughter Hannah, he was a grandfather of Elbridge Thomas Gerry, who married Louisa Matilda Livingston (a granddaughter of Maturin Livingston), and Almy Goelet Gerry, who married Federic Gallatin (a grandson of Secretary of the Treasury Albert Gallatin and cousin of Albert Eugene Gallatin).

Ogden was the father of Mary Goelet, Duchess of Roxburghe.
