= George Gosman DeWitt =

American lawyer and philanthropist

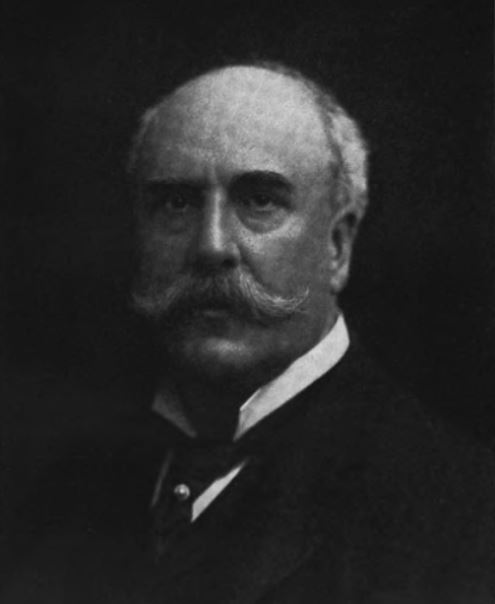

38th President of the Saint Nicholas Society of the City of New York
- In office 1904–1905
- Preceded by: Stuyvesant Fish
- Succeeded by: Austen George Fox

Personal details
- Born: April 9, 1845 Callicoon, New York
- Died: January 12, 1912 (aged 66) Manhattan
- Spouse: Ellen Reed Flagg (m. 1877)
- Parent(s): George Gosman DeWitt Sr. Julia Foster DeWitt
- Education: Columbia Grammar School
- Alma mater: Columbia University; Columbia Law School

George Gosman DeWitt Jr. (April 9, 1845 – January 12, 1912) was an American lawyer and philanthropist.

== Early life ==
DeWitt was born in Callicoon in New York's Sullivan County on April 9, 1845. He was one of seven children born to George Gosman DeWitt Sr. and Julia (née Foster in Lansingburg, New York) DeWitt, who married in 1836. Among his siblings were Jeanette DeWitt; Peter DeWitt, a merchant; Julian Foster DeWitt, who married Ellen Tiffany; William Gillespie DeWitt; Theodore DeWitt; and Susan Caroline DeWitt.

His paternal grandparents were Jenat (née Gosman) DeWitt and Peter DeWitt, the "attorney for the New York City Mayor's Court", and "a man of considerable and varied accomplishments." Among his great-grandparents were Johannes Radcliff DeWitt, a mill-owning Revolutionary War soldier who served as Sheriff of Dutchess County, New York. Among his extended family was Charles DeWitt, a delegate to the Continental Congress; and Charles G. DeWitt, a U.S. Representative and U.S. Chargé d'Affaires, Guatemala.

His father graduated from Yale University in 1826 and worked in a mercantile office in New York City. When his "health became impaired," he moved to Callicoon, where George Jr. was born. Young George attended Dr. Charles Anthon's Columbia Grammar School, followed by Columbia University, earning an A.B. degree in 1867 and an A.M. degree in 1869, and Columbia Law School, where he earned an LL.B. degree in 1870.

== Career ==
DeWitt followed in his grandfather's footsteps and began practicing law. He joined the law firm of DeWitt, Lockman & Kip, whose partners included his uncles C. J. and E. DeWitt and John Thomas Lockman and George Goelet Kip. Based in his grandfather's former office at 88 Nassau Street and later renamed DeWitt, Lockman & DeWitt, the firm was known for its work defending the estates of New York's old Dutch families.

He was a trustee of his alma mater, Columbia University (beginning in 1890), the Fulton Trust Company, the New York Life Insurance and Trust Company, the Greenwich Savings Bank. He was also a director of the Chemical National Bank.

DeWitt was a governor of New York Hospital and Roosevelt Hospital, and a vice-president of the New York Society for the Prevention of Cruelty to Children. He was elected a member of the Saint Nicholas Society of the City of New York on March 4, 1889, and, in 1904, served two terms as the Society's 42nd President, succeeding Stuyvesant Fish.

== Personal life ==
On May 23, 1877, DeWitt was married to Ellen "Ella" Reed Flagg (1852–1933).

DeWitt died of heart disease on January 12, 1912, at his home, 39 West 51st Street in New York City. He was buried at Green-Wood Cemetery in Brooklyn.
