= John Thomas Lockman =

American lawyer and soldier

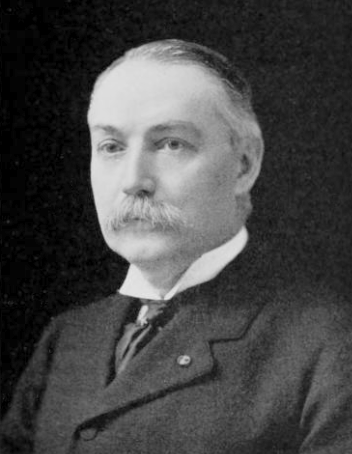

42nd President of the Saint Nicholas Society of the City of New York
- In office 1912 – September 27, 1912
- Preceded by: Charles Augustus Schermerhorn
- Succeeded by: Walter Lispenard Suydam

Personal details
- Born: September 26, 1834 Manhattan, New York, U.S.
- Died: September 27, 1912 (aged 78) Manhattan, New York, U.S.
- Spouse: Harriet Hall (m. 1862)
- Children: 5
- Parent(s): Isaac Paul Lockman; Mary Kennedy Lockman
- Education: Columbia Law School

John Thomas Lockman (September 26, 1834 – September 27, 1912) was an American lawyer and soldier who was brevetted Brigadier General for his efforts for the Union Army in the U.S. Civil War.

== Early life ==
Lockman was born on September 26, 1834, in New York City. He was the son of Isaac Paul Lockman (1798–1871) and Mary (née Kennedy) Lockman (1804–1902). Among his siblings was the attorney Jacob Kennedy Lockman (father of prominent portrait painter DeWitt McClellan Lockman), Sarah H. Lockman (wife of John Flaacke); Isaac Paul Lockman (who contracted malaria during the Civil War); and Katherine Ann Elizabeth Lockman.

His paternal grandparents were Jacob Lockman and Catherine (née Paul) Lockman, and his maternal grandparents were Thomas H. Kennedy, an intimate friend of Scottish poet Robert Burns, and Margaret Kennedy, both of whom were born in Scotland.

== Career ==
Lockman, who served in the old Volunteer Fire Department of New York City for seven years, was a law student when the U.S. Civil War broke out. On April 19, 1861, he enlisted as a private in the Union Army, first taking part in the Martinsburg campaign, under General Robert Patterson, and at the Battle of Ball's Bluff, under General Charles Pomeroy Stone. He was promoted to Captain in the 83rd New York Volunteer Infantry (9th New York State Militia regiment) and participated in the occupation of Winchester, Virginia, and the campaign of Virginia. Lockman was again promoted to lieutenant colonel of the 119th New York Volunteer Infantry and fought in the Army of the Potomac under multiple Union Army Generals, including General George B. McClellan, Ambrose Burnside, Joseph Hooker and George G. Meade.

After Colonel Peisner was killed during the Battle of Chancellorsville, Lockman took charge of the regiment. He later fought in the Battle of Gettysburg, where he was wounded. Later, he was "ordered to the Southwest to reinforce General Thomas' command and fought in the Battles of Wauhatchie and Missionary Ridge and took part in the pursuit of General Bragg and in the relief of Knoxville."

Lockman also participated in the Battles of Cassville, Pine Hill, Kolb's Farm, Dallas, Kennesaw Mountain, Peachtree Creek and the Siege of Atlanta. On March 13, 1865, he was brevetted a Brigadier General of the U.S. Volunteers for "meritorious conduct in the campaign ending with the occupation of Atlanta, Ga."

=== After the War ===
After the War ended, Lockman resumed studying the law and graduated from Columbia Law School in April 1867. Lockman later became a member of the law firm of DeWitt, Lockman & Kip, based at 88 Nassau Street, with George Gosman DeWitt, his brother Jacob Kennedy Lockman, and George Goelet Kip, later known as DeWitt, Lockman & DeWitt. The firm was known for its work defending the estates of New York's old Dutch families. He was also a director of the Lawyers Mortgage Company and the Mortgage Bond Company.

He was elected a member of the Saint Nicholas Society of the City of New York on March 4, 1889, and, in 1912, served as the society's 42nd President, succeeding Charles Augustus Schermerhorn and remaining president until his death in September 1912.

== Personal life ==
On October 14, 1862, while on furlough, Lockman was married to Harriet Hall (1843–1916). She was the daughter of Samuel Hall and Mary (née Hallett) Hall, who were both born in England. Together, Harriett and John were the parents of five children, three daughters and two sons, including:

- Mary Lockman (1866–1945), who married Pierre Joseph Smith (1860–1926), son of Benjamin Duval Smith.
- Jenat DeWitt Lockman (1869–1945), who married John Storm Appleby.
- Isabel Spalding Lockman (1871–1947), who married Dr. William Tod Helmuth Jr., editor of the New York Medical Times, in 1895.
- John Quentin Lockman (1876–1963), a Yale University graduate who became a banker with Harvey Fisk & Sons.
- Frederick Irving Lockman (1878–1945), a Yale and Columbia Law School graduate who married Josephine Kernell. He served in the 12th Infantry of the New York Guard.

He served as a vestryman of Trinity Church, a trustee of the New York Protestant Episcopal Public School, and a member of the New-York Historical Society, the St. Andrew's Society, the Metropolitan Club, the Church Club, the Army and Navy Club, the Metropolitan Museum of Art and the American Museum of Natural History.

Lockman died at his home, 140 West 73rd Street in New York City, on September 27, 1912. He was buried at Woodlawn Cemetery in the Bronx.
