= Elbridge Thomas Gerry =

American lawyer (1837–1927)

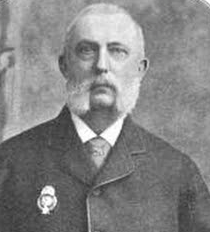
- Gerry in 1896
- Born: December 25, 1837; Charlestown, Rhode Island, U.S.
- Died: February 18, 1927 (aged 89); New York City, U.S.
- Education: Columbia College (1857)
- Spouse: Louisa Matilda Livingston (m. 1867; died 1920)
- Children: Angelica L. Gerry; Mabel Gerry Drury; Robert Livingston Gerry, Sr. Peter Goelet Gerry
- Parent(s): Thomas Russell Gerry; Hannah G. Goelet
- Relatives: Elbridge Gerry (grandfather); Ann Gerry (grandmother); Robert L. Gerry Jr. (grandson); Peter P. Goelet (grandfather)

Elbridge Thomas Gerry (December 25, 1837 – February 18, 1927) was an American lawyer, philanthropist and activist in the U.S. reform movement. He was the Commodore of the New York Yacht Club from 1886 to 1892. His paternal grandfather was U.S. Vice President Elbridge Gerry.

== Early life ==
Gerry was born on December 25, 1837, In Charlestown, Rhode Island, the son of Thomas Russell Gerry, who was active in the Sons of the American Revolution, and Hannah Green Goelet, of another prominent family. In 1857, Gerry graduated from Columbia College, with honors, During his time there he was a member of the Philolexian Society. and also joined the Chi Psi fraternity, eventually becoming its national president.

His paternal grandfather was Founding Father, Massachusetts Governor and U.S. Vice President Elbridge Gerry. His cousins included Elbridge Gerry, who was a member of the U.S. House of Representatives from Maine, George Goelet Kip, and Robert Walton Goelet, who was a financier and real estate developer in New York City. His maternal grandfather was the merchant and landowner Peter P. Goelet and his great-grandfather was Peter Goelet.

In 1879, he inherited $500,000 after the death of his unmarried uncle, Peter Goelet.

== Career ==
After graduation from Columbia, he read law with William Curtis Noyes and was admitted to the New York bar in 1860. He later became partner with Noyes until his death, after which he joined William F. Allen and Vaughn Abbot, practicing as Allen, Abbott & Gerry.

In 1874, Gerry took up the case of Mary Ellen McCormack, who had been abused by her foster parents, which he eventually argued before the Supreme Court of New York.

=== Society for the Prevention of Cruelty to Children ===
In 1875, as a result of Mary Ellen McCormack's case, he co-founded the New York Society for the Prevention of Cruelty to Children "SPCC", sometimes called the Gerry Society, together with Quaker philanthropist John D. Wright and Henry Bergh, who he had previously helped found the American Society for the Prevention of Cruelty to Animals. SPCC was known as one of the first child protection societies in the country and he helped pass numerous laws to protect children.

Gerry served as vice-president of SPCC, then as Wright's successor from 1879 to 1901, and finally as legal advisor until his death. The Society's deputies, nicknamed "Gerry men" or "the cruelty," aroused controversy by enforcing various laws, including child labor laws concerning public performances and were allowed to remove children from homes. Some criticized their activities as interfering with family life, or for imposing aristocratic white Protestant values upon immigrants, many of whom were Catholic or black.

After 1903, many such child protection societies changed their focus from police to welfare work, following a Massachusetts model. The U.S. Supreme Court, in the widely reviled 1918 case Hammer v. Dagenhart, found the new federal child protection law, the Keating-Owen Act of 1916, violated the Commerce Clause of the United States Constitution, in a case now known for its dissent by Justice Oliver Wendell Holmes Jr. Two years later, with Gerry as the organization's legal advisor, SPCCC bought the former House of Mercy for use as a temporary facility to house juveniles awaiting judicial action, since they had previously either been held at stationhouses or jailed with adult prisoners, where they were often victimized. House of Mercy had been organized in 1863 by Harriet Starr Cannon to assist abandoned and delinquent women and girls.

=== New York Yacht Club ===
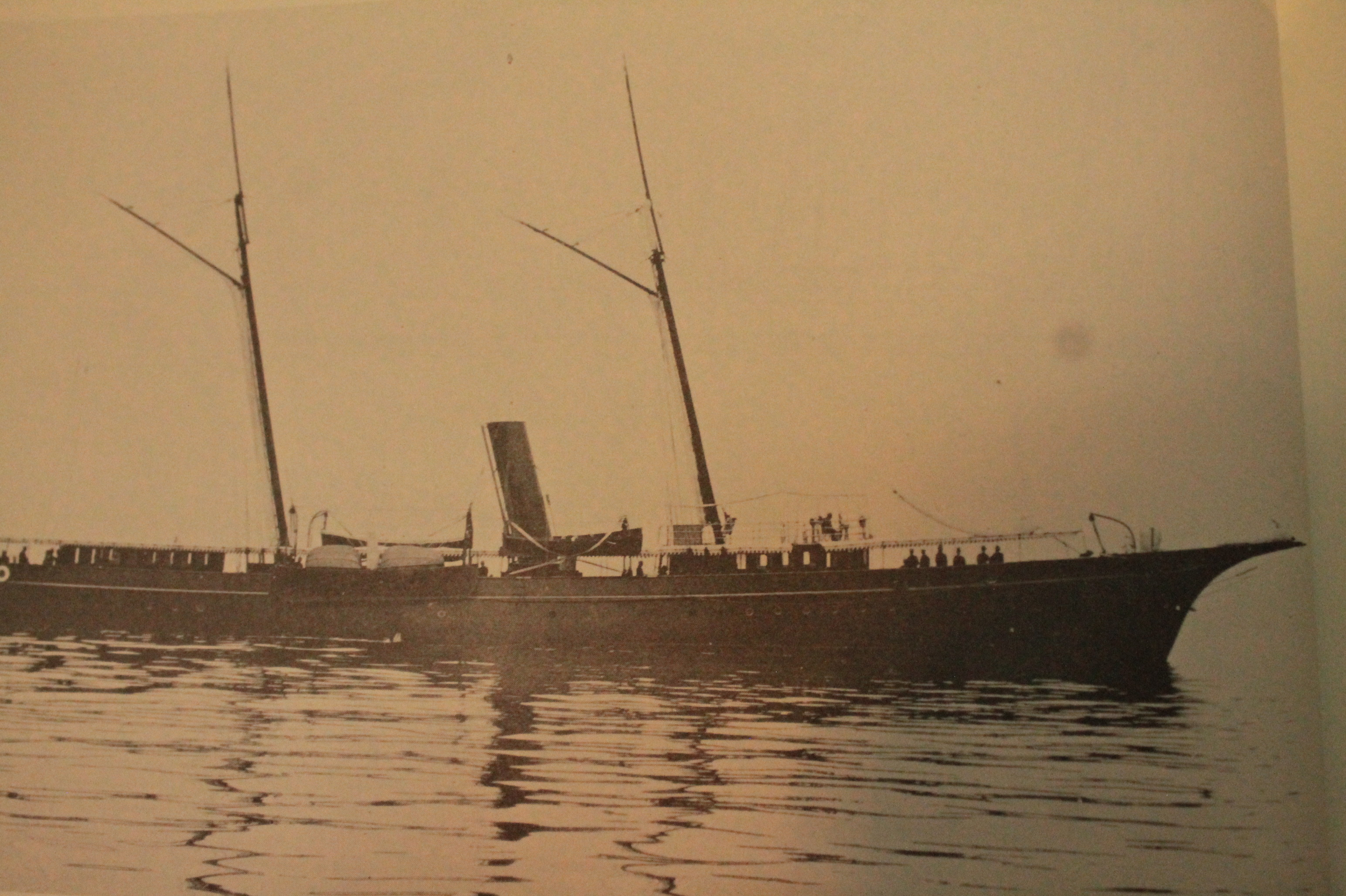
SY Electra around 1886

In 1884 Gerry commissioned Harlan & Hollingsworth of Wilmington to build a 173 foot steam yacht named SY Electra. This was perhaps the first such yacht to have electric lighting comprising 58 individual lights plus a strong searchlight. She was also the first yacht to have an icemaker on board, capable off creating 56 pounds of ice per day, to chill Gerry's champagne. The ship was broken in 1912.

Gerry was Commodore of the New York Yacht Club. He held office from 1886 to 1892. The pilot boat Elbridge T. Gerry was named in honor of him.

=== Politics and boards ===
Gerry was a notable member of Tammany Hall, the Democratic political machine of Boss Tweed, for more than 35 years. In 1867, he served as a delegate to New York State Constitutional Convention, but never again sought elective office.

From 1878 until 1912, he served as governor of the New York Hospital and was also a trustee of the New York Life Insurance Company. From 1886 until 1888, Gerry served as chairman of the New York State Commission on Capital Punishment, which replaced hanging with the electric chair. For this decision, a proposed name for this method before "electrocution" was adopted was "gerrycide". He was also chairman of the New York City Commission on Insanity in 1892.

== Personal life ==
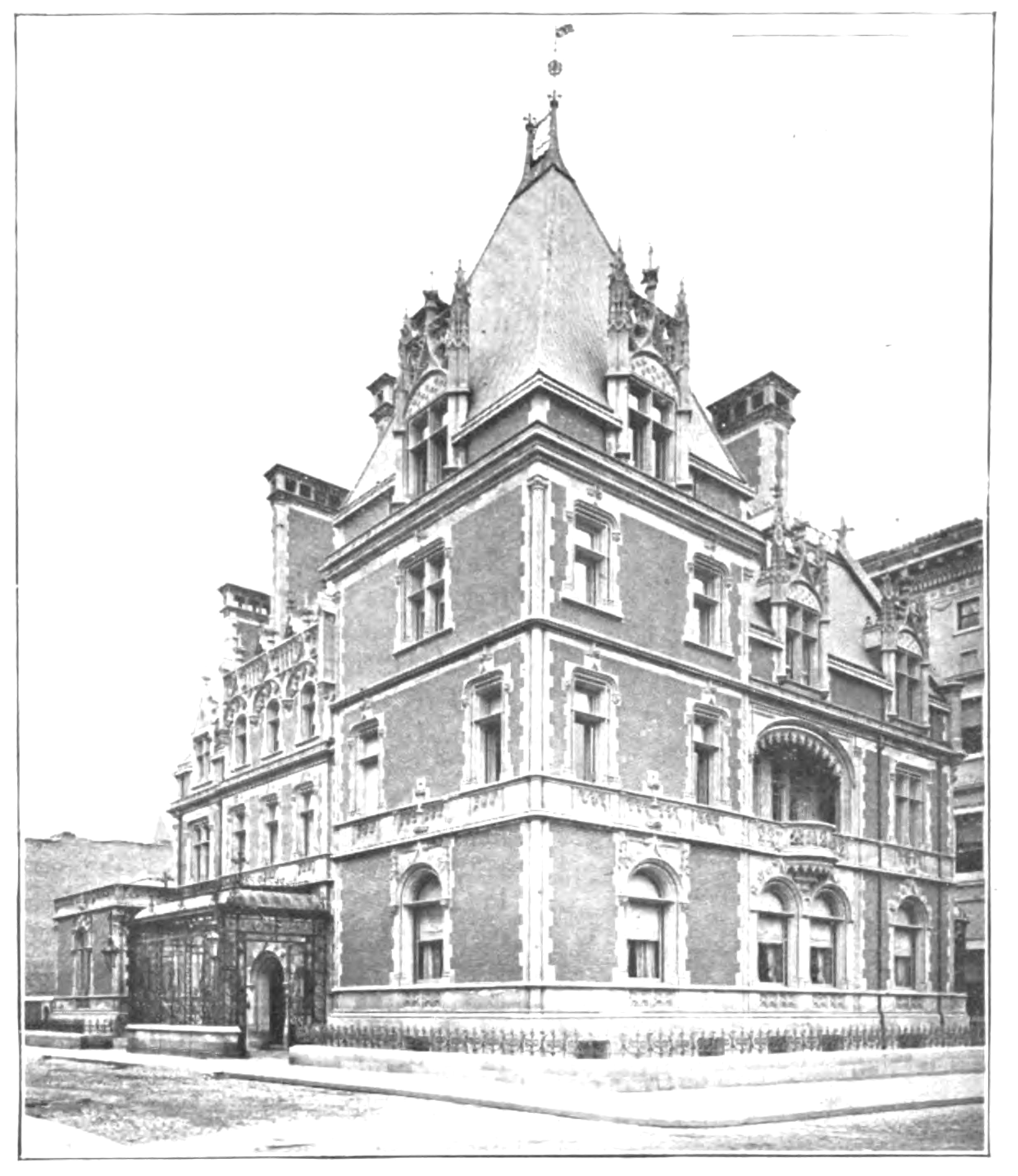
Gerry's Fifth Avenue mansion.

In 1867, Gerry married Louisa Matilda Livingston. Louisa was the daughter of Robert James Livingston and Louisa Matilda Storm and the granddaughter of Maturin Livingston and Margaret Lewis. Margaret was the only child and sole heiress of Gov. Morgan Lewis. Together, Elbridge and Louisa had six children:

- Angelica Livingston Gerry (1871–1960), died unmarried. (See Ancrum House.)
- Mabel Gerry (1872–1930), who married Francis Saxham Elwes Drury (1859–1937), a widower, in 1925. Drury had previously been married to Mary Gertrude Peek (1861–1921)
- Lillian Goelet Gerry (1873-1891)
- Margaret "Pearl" Louisa Gerry (1868-1872)
- Robert Livingston Gerry, Sr. (1877–1957), who married Cornelia Averell Harriman (1884–1966), the second daughter of railroad executive E. H. Harriman and his wife Mary Williamson Averell, in 1908.
- Peter Goelet Gerry (1879–1957), U.S. Representative and Senator from Rhode Island, who married Mathilde Townsend in 1910. They divorced in 1925 and he later married Edith Stuyvesant Dresser (1873–1958), the widow of George Washington Vanderbilt II (1862–1914).

In 1904, the Swiss-born American artist Adolfo Müller-Ury (1862–1947) painted Gerry's portrait, which still hangs in the New York Yacht Club.

Gerry died on February 18, 1927, about two weeks after breaking his hip in a fall, outliving his wife by seven years. He was entombed in the churchyard of St. James Church in Hyde Park, New York. The associated Episcopal church is best known for its association with Franklin D. Roosevelt, who served on the vestry and as senior warden, and tours of the cemetery continue to be offered. At his death, Gerry was reputed to be worth $26 million, primarily in landholdings, making him one of the city's wealthiest men.

=== Residences ===
His family's New York mansion at 2 East 61st Street had long been a center of cultivated and fashionable life, even as it came to be surrounded by skyscrapers. When he built it, he told architect Richard Morris Hunt specifically about needing to house his collection of 30,000 law books and cost a reported $3,000,000. After his death, the family mansions in Manhattan were soon demolished, to make way for the Pierre Hotel.

Gerry maintained a summer home named "Seaverge" on Bellevue Avenue in Newport, Rhode Island. His wife's estate in the Catskill Mountains was called "Aknusti", supposedly from an American Indian word meaning "expensive proposition."
