= Robert Goelet =

American heir, businessman and yachtsman

- Born: September 29, 1841; New York City, US
- Died: April 27, 1899 (aged 57); Naples, Italy
- Education: Columbia University (BA)
- Board member of: Chemical National Bank
- Spouse: Harriette Louise Warren (m. 1879)
- Children: Robert Walton Goelet; Beatrice Goelet
- Parent(s): Robert Goelet Sr. Sarah Ogden Goelet
- Relatives: Goelet family

Robert Goelet Jr. (September 29, 1841 – April 27, 1899) was an American heir, businessman and yachtsman from New York City during the Gilded Age.

== Early life ==
Goelet was born on September 29, 1841, in Manhattan, New York City, to Sarah Ogden (1809–1888) and Robert Goelet (1809–1879). He had a younger brother, Ogden Goelet, who married society leader Mary Rita Wilson and built Ochre Court in Newport, Rhode Island. Through his brother, he was the uncle of Mary Goelet, who married Henry Innes-Ker, 8th Duke of Roxburghe and real estate developer Robert Wilson Goelet.

His parents lived at 5 State Street, overlooking the Battery in Manhattan. His father was a prominent landlord in New York, as was his uncle, Peter Goelet, who was named after his great-grandfather, Peter Goelet. His grandfather was the merchant and landowner Peter P. Goelet.

== Career ==
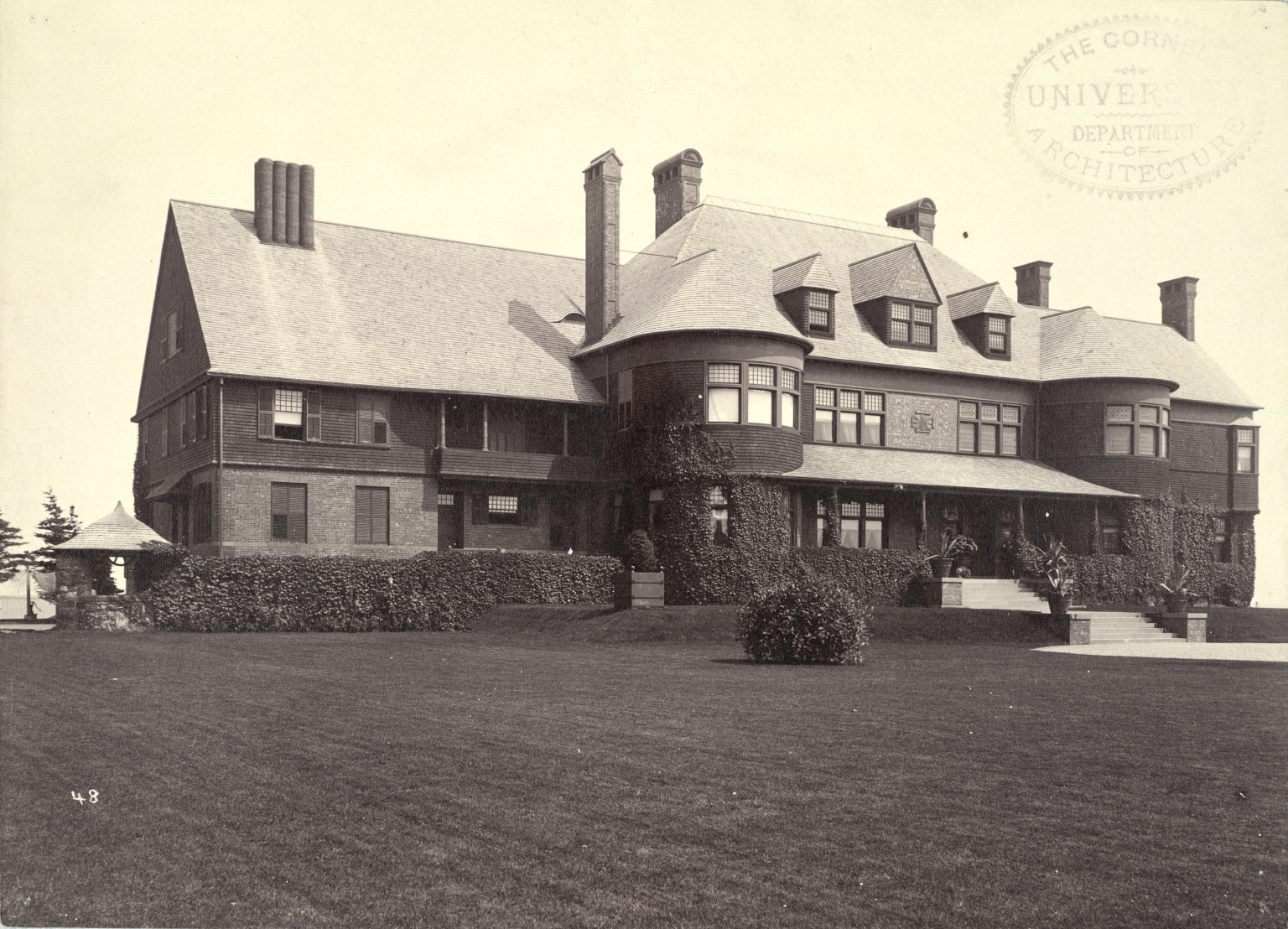
Goelet's house in Newport, Rhode Island

He graduated from Columbia College in 1860 where he was a member of the Philolexian Society. He was subsequently admitted to the bar. Goelet practiced law in the C.J & E. DeWitt (later DeWitt, Lockman and Kip) law firm that also counted his cousin George Goelet Kip and George Gosman DeWitt among its partners, before retiring in 1879 to manage the real estate of his father and his unmarried uncle. After their deaths, he inherited half their fortune. He also served on the board of directors of the Union Trust Company, the New York Life Insurance and Trust Company, the Guaranty Trust Company, the Bank of New Amsterdam, the Chemical National Bank, which his father and uncle were instrumental in founding. In his obituary in The New York Times, he was described as:

"He was clear-headed and keen-witted, and his judgment in financial and real estate matters invariably commanded the respect of other business men. A loyal New Yorker, Robert Goelet took particular pride in promoting the growth and development of the city with which his family had long so long identified. He was a man of progressive ideas, and throughout his business career pursued a policy of improving his properties in a manner which would beautify the city."

=== Social and sporting life ===
Goelet was a member of the exclusive Philadelphia Club, the New York Yacht Club, the Knickerbocker Club, the Metropolitan Club, the Tuxedo Club, the Union Club of the City of New York and was one of the original stockholders of the Metropolitan Opera House, both before it burned in 1892 and after it was rebuilt. He was also a member of the Jekyll Island Club on Jekyll Island, Georgia.

His yacht Nahma was designed by George Lennox Watson, and built for him on the River Clyde in 1897. After his death, it was used extensively for summer cruising in European waters by his son, Robert Walton Goelet, who lent the yacht at no cost to the United States Navy. The Navy operated it as USS Nahma (SP-771) from 1917 to 1919, after which it was returned.

== Personal life ==
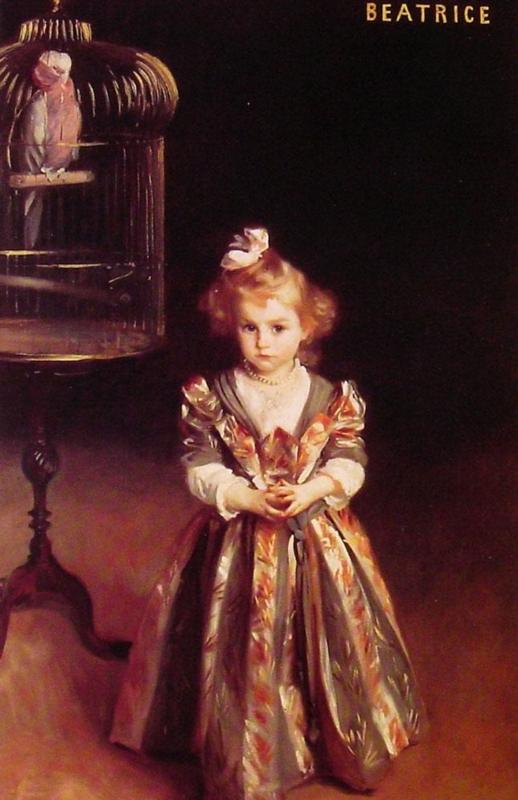
Goelet's daughter, Beatrice, by John Singer Sargent, 1890

On April 17, 1879, Goelet married Harriette Louise Warren (1854-1912) in New York City. Harriette was a daughter of George Henry Warren I, a prominent lawyer, and Mary (née Phoenix) Warren (herself the daughter of U.S. Representative Jonas P. Phoenix and granddaughter of Stephen Whitney). Harriet was the sister of stockbroker George Henry Warren II and prominent architects Whitney Warren and Lloyd Warren.

The Goelets lived in a townhouse located at 591 Fifth Avenue in Manhattan (designed by Edward H. Kendall in 1880), as well as at seasonal homes in Tuxedo Park, New York, and Newport, Rhode Island (designed by McKim, Mead & White, c. 1882–1883). Together, Harriette and Robert Goelet had two children:

- Robert Walton Goelet (1880–1941), a financier and real estate developer.
- Beatrice Goelet (1885–1902), who died of pneumonia in 1902, aged 17. As a child, she was painted by John Singer Sargent.

He died of heart disease on April 27, 1899, in Naples, Italy. After his body was brought from Italy by his yacht Nahma, his funeral was held at Trinity Church in Newport. After the funeral, his body was again taken "by special train over the New Haven Road", and was buried in the Goelet Mausoleum, which had been completed only days before, at Woodlawn Cemetery in the Bronx. His widow lived for another 13 years until her death in December 1912 at her home in Paris, 46 Avenue d'Iéna.

The statue Alma Mater at Columbia University was given in his memory.
