= Ochre Court =

Historic house in Rhode Island, United States

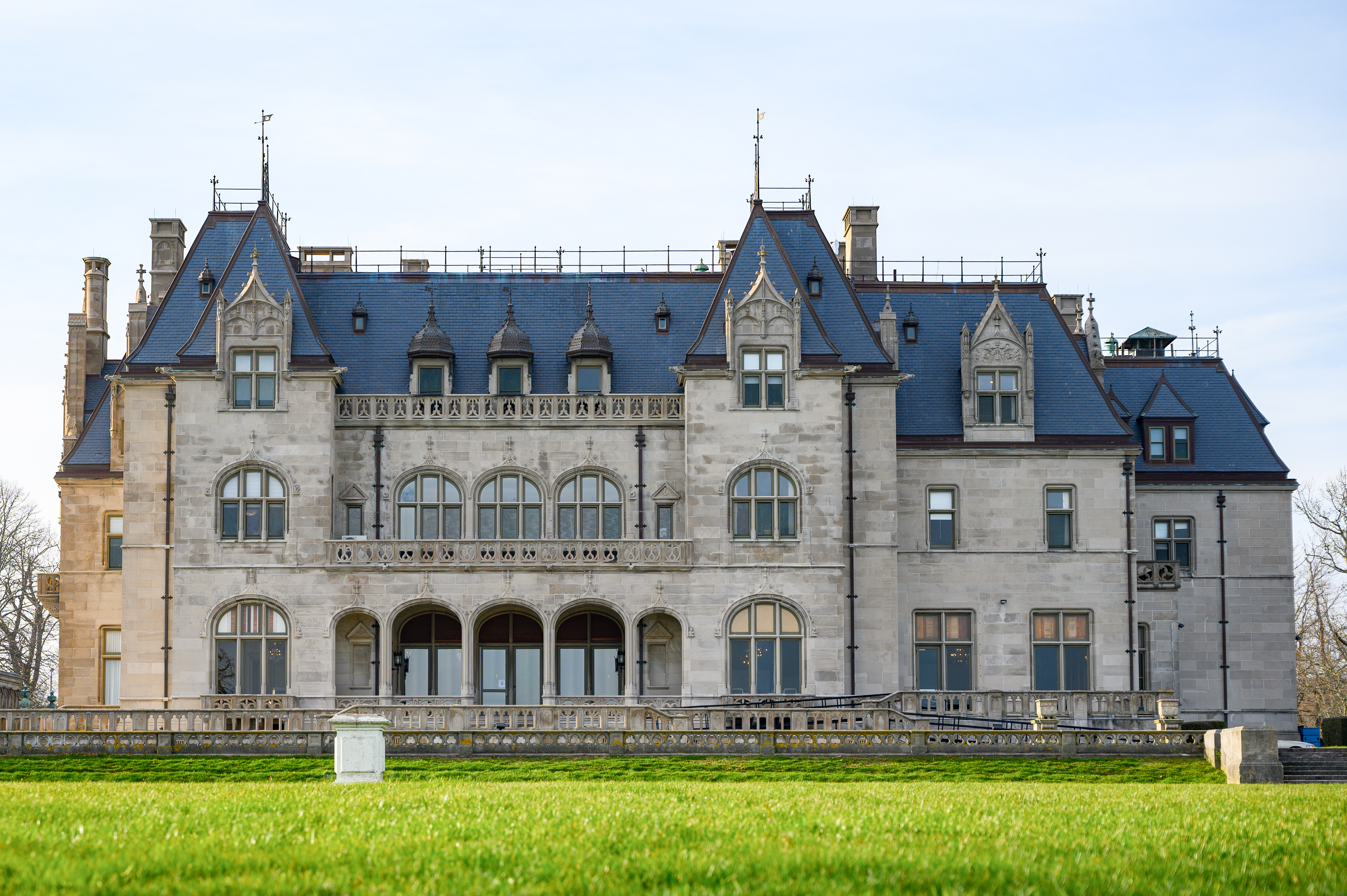
- Ochre Court from the rear lawns
- Interactive map of the Ochre Court area

General information
- Architectural style: Châteauesque
- Location: Newport, Rhode Island, United States
- Coordinates: 41°28′25.58″N 71°17′56.19″W
- Client: Ogden Goelet

Design and construction
- Architect: Richard Morris Hunt

Ochre Court is a large châteauesque mansion in Newport, Rhode Island, United States. Commissioned by Ogden Goelet, it was built at a cost of $4.5 million in 1892. It is the second largest mansion in Newport after nearby The Breakers. These two mansions, along with Belcourt Castle (the 3rd largest mansion) and Marble House, were designed by architect Richard Morris Hunt. It is owned by Salve Regina University.

== History ==
The Goelet family was an American dynasty that had grown from humble 18th century trade into vast 19th century investments. Ogden Goelet was a banker, real estate investor and competitive yachtsman. His wife, Mary Wilson Goelet, oversaw the operation of Ochre Court during a typical eight-week summer season. This usually required twenty-seven house servants, eight coachmen and grooms and twelve gardeners.

Richard Morris Hunt designed Ochre Court, modelling the mansion on the chateaux of France's Loire Valley. The design is in the Louis XIII-style of architecture, with high roofs, turrets, tall chimneys and elaborate dormers. Elaborate decoration is seen inside and out in classical-style ceiling paintings, heraldry, carved emblems and statues, and a profusion of stained glass.

The Goelets' daughter, May, married Henry Innes-Ker, 8th Duke of Roxburghe, taking with her an $8 million dowry. The Goelets' son, Robert Wilson Goelet, was a businessman with an interest in American railroads, hotels and real estate. Robert gave Ochre Court to the Sisters of Mercy in 1947.

== In popular culture ==
The exterior of this mansion was used for the movie True Lies to depict the Swiss mansion that Arnold Schwarzenegger infiltrates then escapes in the opening sequence.

In the video game Payday 2, the architecture of Shacklethorne Mansion, a fictional mansion which is the location of the Shacklethorne Auction heist in the game, was inspired by the back side of Ochre Court. Shacklethorne Auction does not take place in Newport, but in Salem, Massachusetts.

The exterior and interior of the mansion was used as a filming location for The Gilded Age season 3. Ochre Court was the fictional Sidmouth Castle.

== Gallery ==
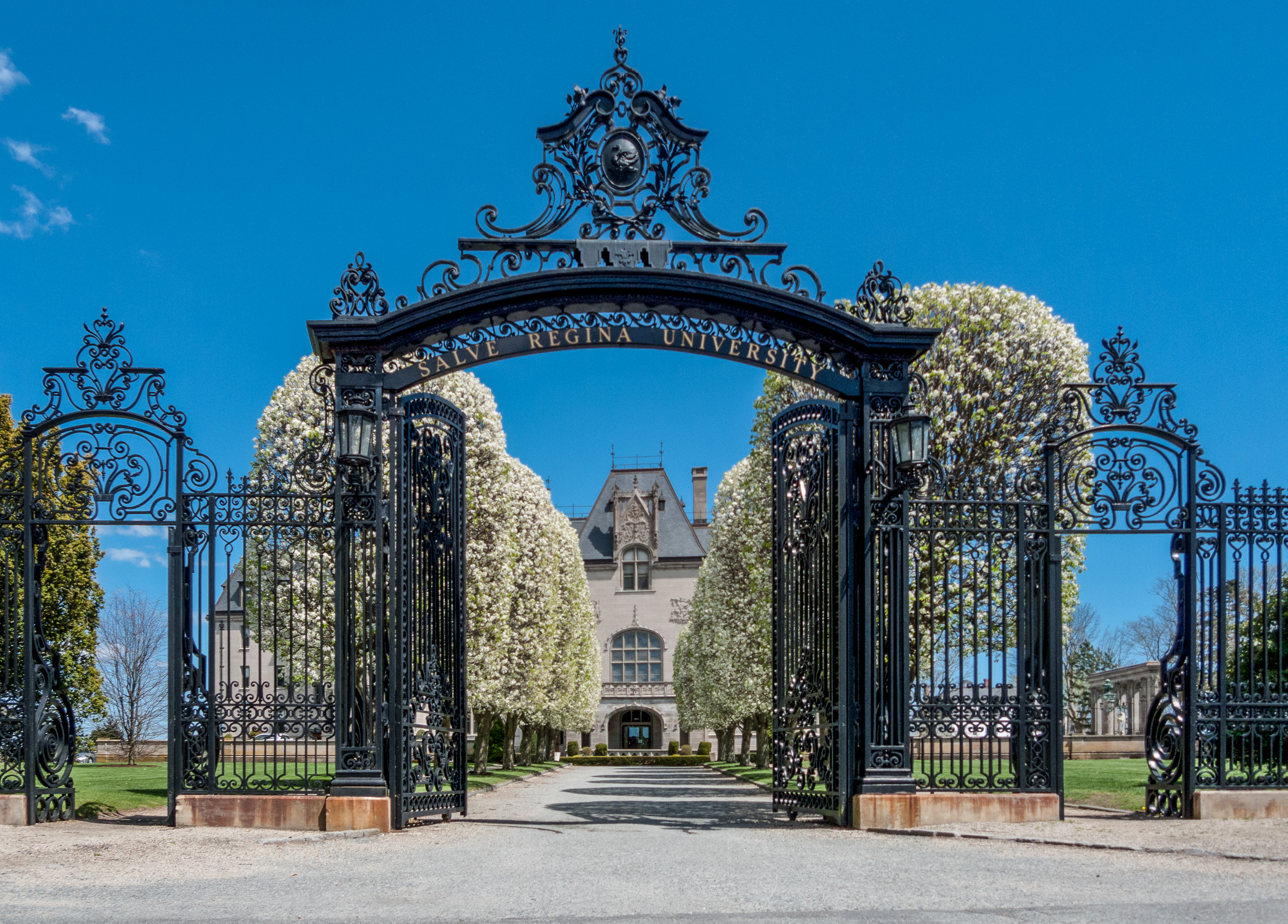
Salve Regina University's gates frame the building's driveway

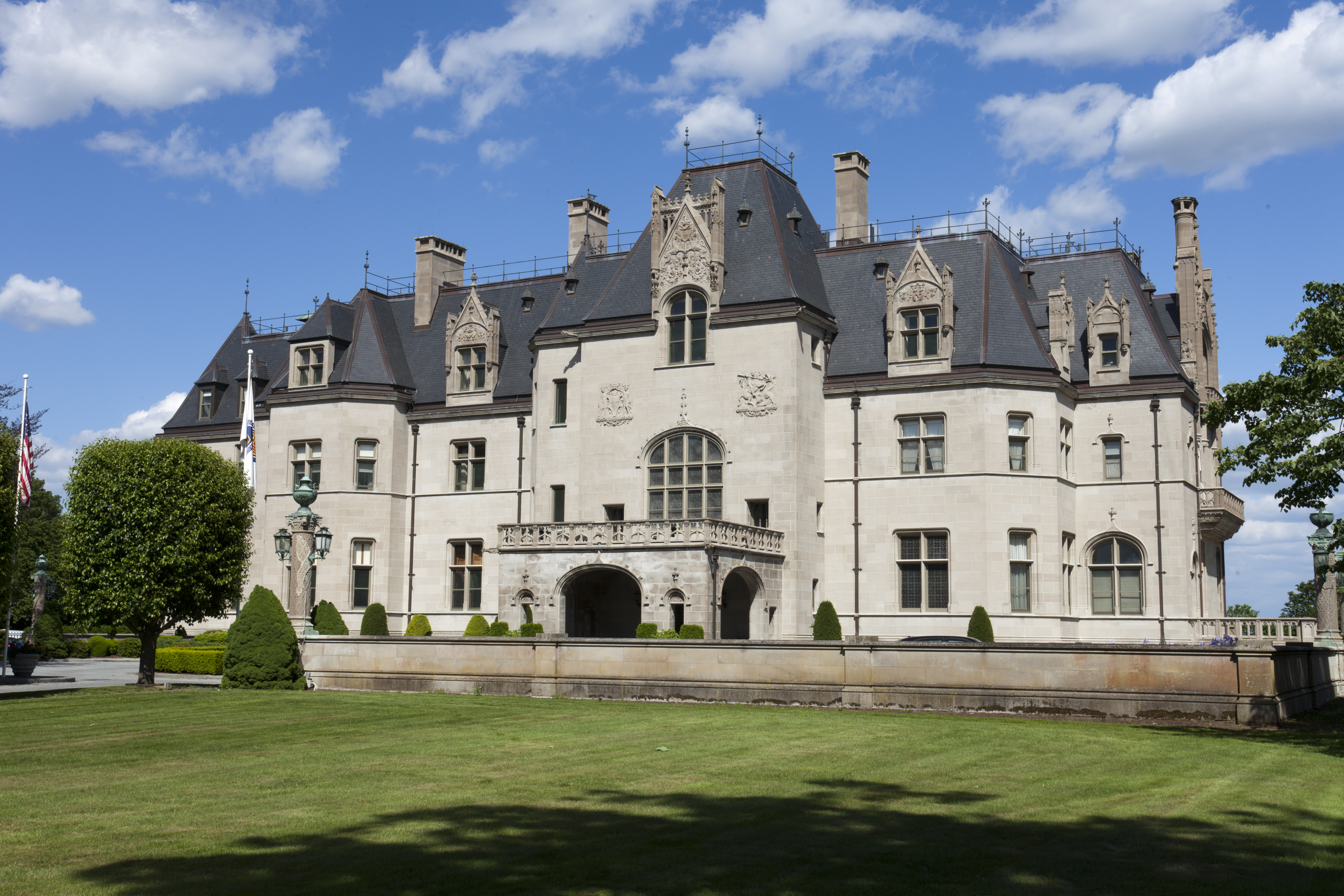
Front elevation

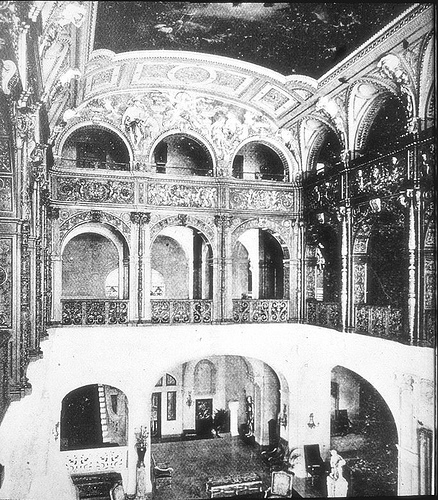
Main hall (1888)

== See also ==
- List of Gilded Age mansions
