= Peter G. Gerry =

American politician (1879–1957)

Peter Gerry
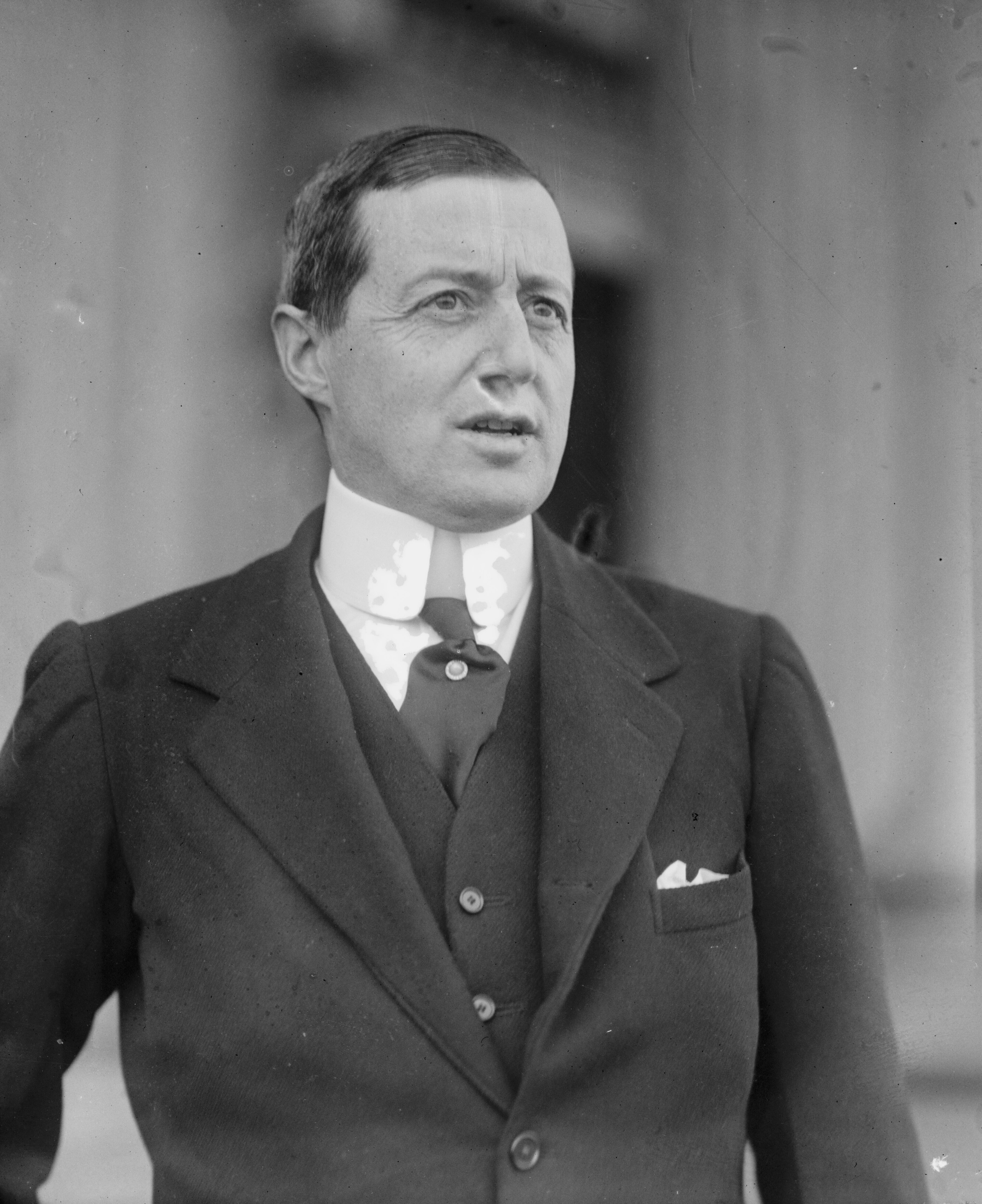
- Gerry in 1920

Senate Minority Whip
- In office March 4, 1919 – March 3, 1929
- Leader: Thomas S. Martin (1919); Gilbert Hitchcock (1919–1920); Oscar Underwood (1920–1923); Joseph Taylor Robinson (1923–1929)
- Preceded by: Charles Curtis
- Succeeded by: Morris Sheppard

United States Senator from Rhode Island
- In office January 3, 1935 – January 3, 1947
- Preceded by: Felix Hebert
- Succeeded by: J. Howard McGrath
- In office March 4, 1917 – March 3, 1929
- Preceded by: Henry F. Lippitt
- Succeeded by: Felix Hebert

Member of the U.S. House of Representatives from Rhode Island's 2nd district
- In office March 4, 1913 – March 3, 1915
- Preceded by: George H. Utter
- Succeeded by: Walter Russell Stiness

Personal details
- Born: Peter Goelet Gerry; September 18, 1879 New York City, U.S.
- Died: October 31, 1957 (aged 78) Providence, Rhode Island, U.S.
- Resting place: St James Cemetery; Hyde Park, New York, U.S.
- Party: Democratic
- Spouses: Mathilde Townsend (m. 1910; div. 1925) Edith Stuyvesant Vanderbilt (m. 1925)
- Parent(s): Elbridge Thomas Gerry; Louisa Matilda Livingston
- Relatives: Robert Livingston Gerry Sr. (brother)
- Education: Harvard University (BA)

Peter Goelet Gerry (September 18, 1879 – October 31, 1957) was an American lawyer and politician who served in the United States House of Representatives and later, as a U.S. senator from Rhode Island. He is the only U.S. senator in American history to lose re-election and later reclaim his Senate seat from the person who had defeated him.

== Early life ==
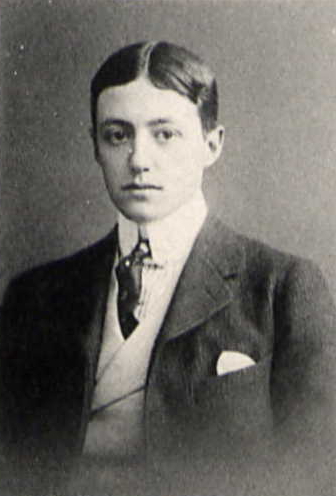
Gerry in the Harvard University yearbook, 1901

Gerry was born on September 18, 1879, in Manhattan, New York City, to Elbridge Thomas Gerry and Louisa Matilda Livingston Gerry. He was a great-grandson of Elbridge Gerry, the fifth Vice President of the United States (who had given his name to the term gerrymandering). His father was worth an estimated $25,000,000 (equivalent to $834,051,724 today) in 1912. Through his paternal grandmother, Hannah Green Goelet, he was a great-great-grandson of real estate investor Peter Goelet. His father, Elbridge T. Gerry, was first cousins with Robert Goelet and Ogden Goelet.

In the summer of 1899, Gerry and his brother Robert were tutored by William Lyon Mackenzie King, who later became the Prime Minister of Canada. In 1901, Gerry graduated from Harvard University. He studied law and was admitted to the Rhode Island bar in 1906.

== Career ==
Gerry inherited large real estate holdings from his mother, who died in 1920, which Gerry and his elder brother agreed to sell in 1922. In a 1918 trust agreement, the brothers and their sisters, Angelica Livingston Gerry and Mabel Gerry, could all exchange ownership in Gerry real estate for stock in the Gerry Estates, Inc.

=== Political career ===
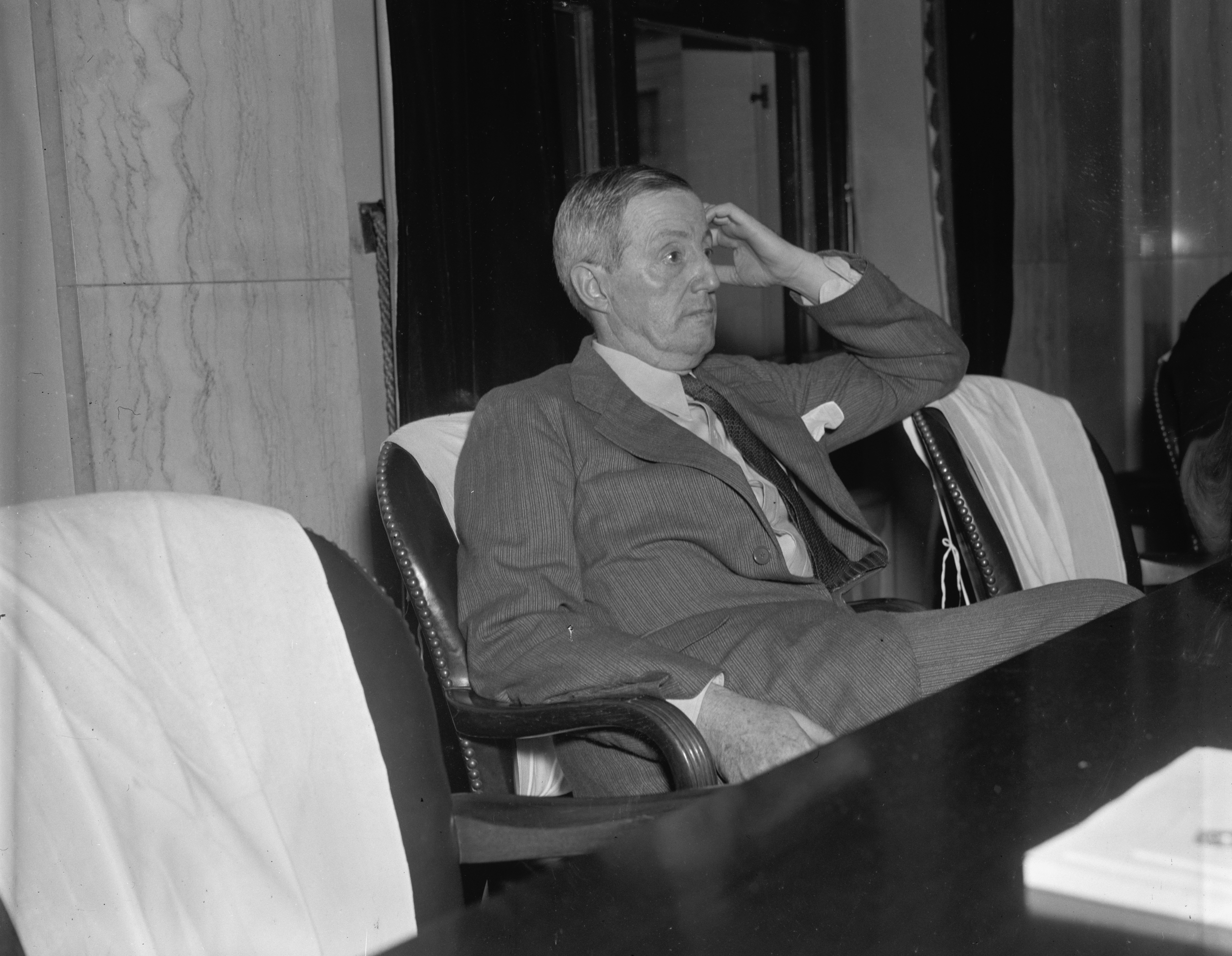
Gerry in 1937

Gerry was elected to the United States House of Representatives for Rhode Island's 2nd District as a Democrat from 1913 to 1915. He was an unsuccessful candidate for re-election in 1914, but he was elected to the United States Senate in 1916 and served from 1917 to 1929. He was the first United States senator from Rhode Island elected by popular vote rather than by the state legislature, after the adoption of the Seventeenth Amendment. He was also the first Democratic United States senator from Rhode Island since 1859.

From 1919 to 1929, Gerry was the Democratic Whip. He has been described as a "Wilsonian Moralist". In 1928 he lost re-election to Republican Felix Hebert, but in a 1934 rematch Gerry defeated Hebert and returned to the Senate, the first time that someone had lost a Senate seat and then regained it from the person who had defeated him. Re-elected in 1940, Gerry did not seek re-election in 1946.

Despite the great divide between Democrats and Republicans during his first stint in the Senate, Gerry appeared open to a cordial relationship with the Majority Whip, Senator Charles Curtis, who later became Senate Majority Leader and Vice President.

== Personal life ==
Portrait of Gerry's first wife, Mathilde Townsend, painted by John Singer Sargent, 1907

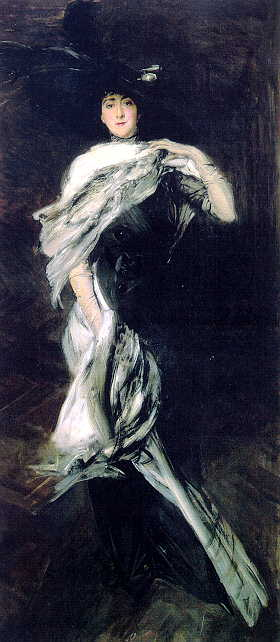
Portrait of Gerry's second wife, Edith Stuyvesant Dresser, painted by Giovanni Boldini, 1900

=== First marriage ===
In 1910, Gerry married Mathilde Scott Townsend (1885–1949), the daughter of Richard H. Townsend (1850–1902), the President of the Erie and Pittsburgh Railroad, and the granddaughter of William Lawrence Scott (1828–1891), a Pennsylvania railroad and coal magnate who was a member of the U.S. House of Representatives from Pennsylvania. They did not have children and divorced in 1925. Later that same year, Mathilde married Sumner Welles (1892–1961), who was seven years her junior, and who had divorced his wife, Esther Slater, in 1923. At the time, rumors circulated around Washington that Sumner and Mathilde were having an affair that wrecked both their marriages.

=== Second marriage ===
On October 22, 1925, Gerry married Edith Stuyvesant Dresser (1873–1958), the widow of George Washington Vanderbilt II (1862–1914). Edith, a daughter of Maj. George Warren Dresser, was the mother of Cornelia Stuyvesant Vanderbilt (1900–1976), who married John Francis Amherst Cecil, son of Lord William Cecil and Mary Rothes Margaret Tyssen-Amherst, 2nd Baroness Amherst of Hackney.

=== Death ===
Gerry died on October 31, 1957, in Providence, Rhode Island. His elder brother, Robert Livingston Gerry, died several hours later in Delhi, New York. He was buried at St James Cemetery, Hyde Park, New York. His widow died on December 21, 1958.

== See also ==
- List of Harvard University politicians

U.S. House of Representatives
Preceded by George H. Utter	Member of the U.S. House of Representatives from Rhode Island's 2nd congressional district 1913–1915	Succeeded by Walter Russell Stiness
Party political offices
First	Democratic nominee for U.S. Senator from Rhode Island (Class 1); 1916, 1922, 1928, 1934, 1940	Succeeded by J. Howard McGrath
Preceded by William S. Flynn	Democratic nominee for U.S. Senator from Rhode Island (Class 2); 1930	Succeeded by Theodore Francis Green
Preceded by J. Hamilton Lewis	Senate Democratic Whip; 1919–1929	Succeeded by Morris Sheppard
U.S. Senate
Preceded by Henry F. Lippitt	U.S. Senator (Class 1) from Rhode Island; 1917–1929; Served alongside: LeBaron B. Colt, Jesse H. Metcalf	Succeeded by Felix Hebert
Preceded by James D. Phelan	Chair of the Senate Railroads Committee; 1917–1919	Succeeded by Irvine Lenroot
Preceded by Charles Curtis	Senate Minority Whip; 1919–1929	Succeeded by Morris Sheppard
Preceded by Felix Hebert	U.S. Senator (Class 1) from Rhode Island; 1935–1947; Served alongside: Jesse H. Metcalf, Theodore F. Green	Succeeded by J. Howard McGrath
