= George Goelet Kip =

American lawyer and heir

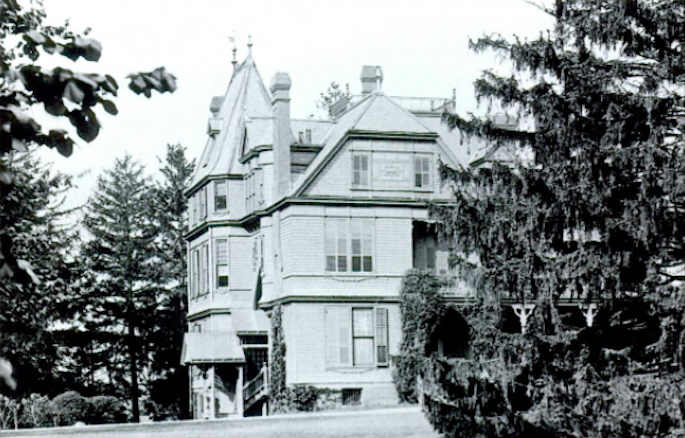
- Ruremont, Kip's estate in Morristown, New Jersey
- Born: January 15, 1845; New York City, U.S.
- Died: June 27, 1926 (aged 81); Morristown, New Jersey, U.S.
- Education: Columbia University
- Occupation: Lawyer
- Spouse: Anna Margaret Geissenhainer (m. 1867; death 1893)
- Children: 3
- Parent(s): Elbert Samuel Kip; Elizabeth Goelet Kip
- Relatives: See Goelet family

George Goelet Kip (January 15, 1845 – June 27, 1926) was a New York lawyer, heir and member of the Goelet family during the Gilded Age.

== Early life ==
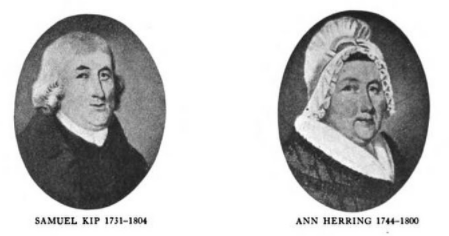
George G. Kip's great-grandparents, Samuel Kip and Anna Herring, who owned the Kips Bay farm at the time of the American Revolution.

Kip was born on January 15, 1845, in New York City. He was the son of Elbert Samuel Kip (1799–1876) and Elizabeth (née Goelet) Kip (1808–1882). Growing up, Kip lived with his parents, his sister Margaret (who died young), and the family's servants in a house overlooking Washington Square in Manhattan. Both of his parents inherited a substantial amount of property and never worked during their lifetimes.

On his father's side Kip was a descendant of Jessé de Forest and Hendrick Hendricksen Kip, founder of the Kip family of Kips Bay, Manhattan. During the American Revolution, his great-grandparents Samuel Kip and Anna Herring owned the famous Kips Bay Mansion, the oldest house in Manhattan until it was taken down in 1851. On his mother's side, Kip was a great-grandson of Peter Goelet, a wealthy New York merchant and progenitor of the Goelet family real estate fortune.

Kip attended Columbia University as an undergraduate, graduating in 1865. While at Columbia, Kip served as the President of the Peithologian Society, a student debating society. He received his LLM from Columbia in 1867.

== Career ==
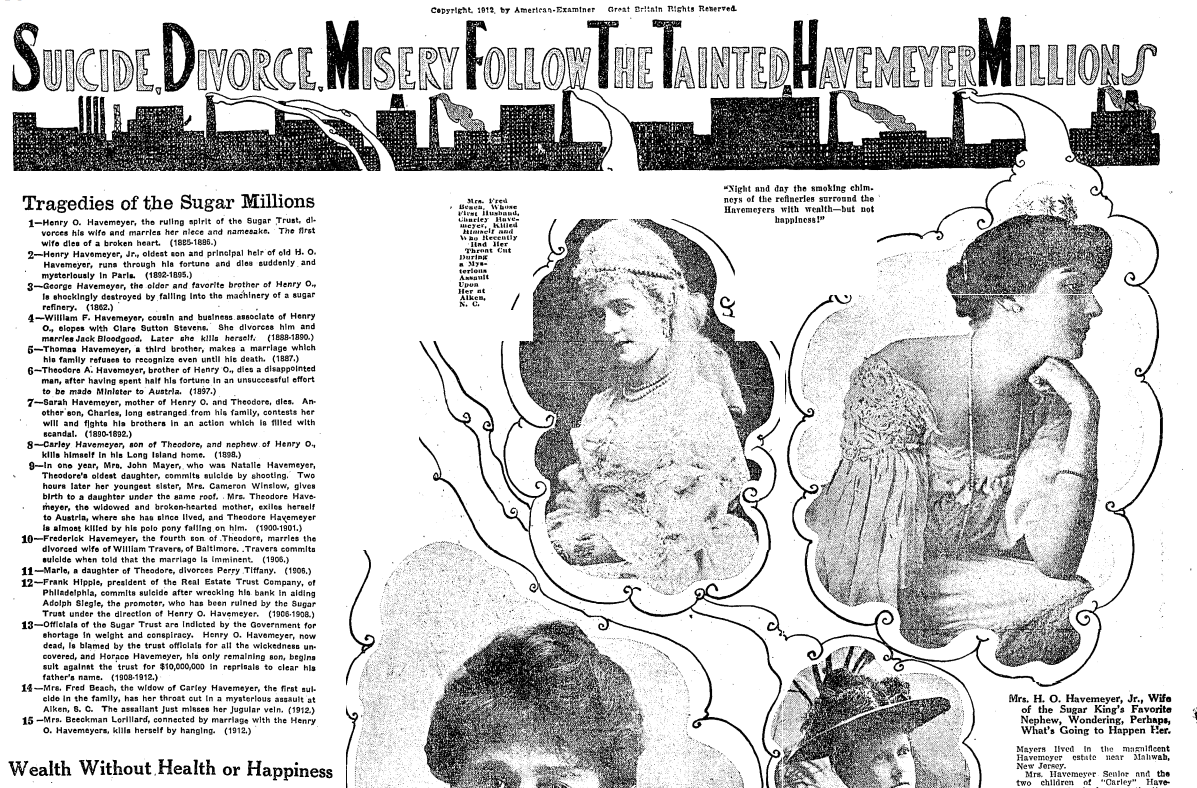
1912 Newspaper Article about the Havemeyer Family, the family of George G. Kip's wife Anna

Kip was a partner in the law firm DeWitt, Lockman and Kip, based at 88 Nassau Street, for a number of years, along with George Gosman DeWitt and John Thomas Lockman. In 1882 he represented his cousins Robert Goelet and Ogden Goelet (builder of Ochre Court and father of Mary Goelet) before the New York Supreme Court in a legal battle that erupted over control of trusts set up by Peter P. Goelet and Jean B. Goelet for their nephews. Kip's firm was known for its work defending the estates of New York's old Dutch families.

In the 1880s, Kip moved his family and servants to Ruremont, an 11-acre country estate on Madison Avenue in Morristown, New Jersey, a street then known as "Millionaires Row." In 1902, the Town and Country Life magazine wrote that Ruremont, “with its smooth lawns and well-ordered gardens and greenhouses,” was “one of the most attractive places in Morristown.”

Kip was a member of the exclusive Holland Society of New York, the Saint Nicholas Society of the City of New York, the University Club of New York and The Metropolitan Club. He also maintained an extensive correspondence with preservationist John Muir, of whom he was a friend and financial supporter.

== Personal life ==
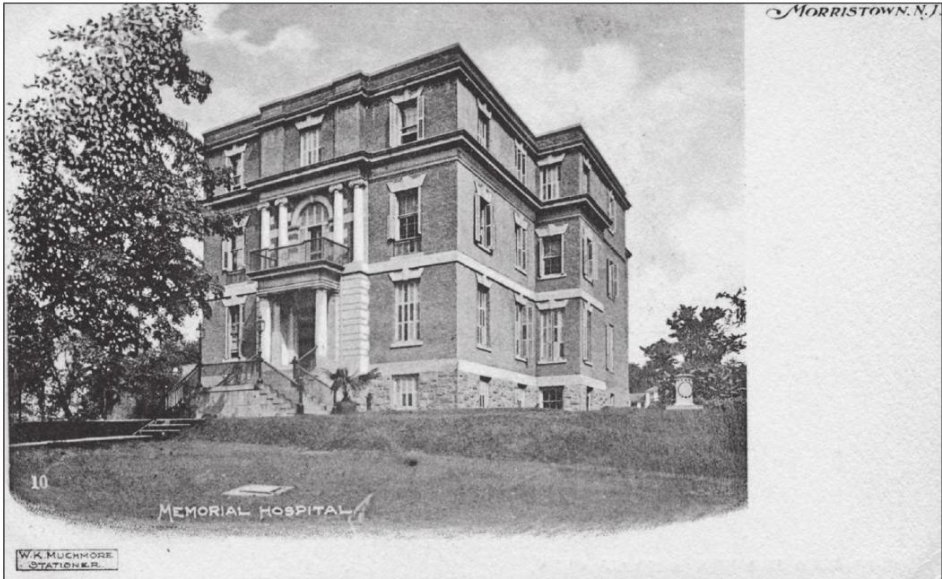
Morristown Memorial Hospital Building donated by Kip

On May 23, 1867, Kip was married to Anna Margaret Geissenhainer (1847–1893) in Bethlehem, Pennsylvania by the Rev. George W. Schumucker. Anna was the daughter of the Rev. Augustus T. Geissenhainer and Amelia (née Havemeyer) Geissenhainer. She was also the niece of three-term New York City mayor William Frederick Havemeyer. (Note: In 1896, Anna's cousins Theodore Havemeyer and Henry Osborne Havemeyer funded the construction of Havemeyer Hall at Columbia University in honor of their father, Frederick Christian Havemeyer. Another one of Anna's Havemeyer cousins was John Isaiah Northrop, the Columbia University professor who blew himself up in his laboratory at the Columbia School of Mines in 1891 and the father of Nobel Prize Laureate John Howard Northrop.) Her mother and uncle were children of William Havemeyer, founder of the sugar refining company that would become the Sugar Trust (later Domino Sugar). Through her father, Anna was also a second cousin of the New Jersey congressman Jacob Augustus Geissenhainer. Together, George and Anna were the parents of three children:

- Charles Augustus Kip (1870–1940), married Marie Gilmour Bryce (1878–1940).
- Elbert Samuel Kip (1874–1950), married Alice Alden Bushnell (1872–1952), a granddaughter of the industrialist and oil trader Daniel Bushnell. Alice's nephew, Joseph Bushnell Ames, was a prolific novelist during the early 20th century, and her first cousin, Mary Warden Harkness, was the wife of Charles W. Harkness. Another one of Alice's nephews, Peter Ashmun Ames, a member of the Cairo Gang, was assassinated by the Irish Republican Army in Dublin on Bloody Sunday while working as an agent for the British MI5.
- Anna Elizabeth Kip (1880–1918), married A. Paul Olmsted (1882–1948), the son of Charles Sanford Olmsted, the Bishop of Colorado.

His wife died suddenly of heart failure on April 5, 1893, and in 1898 Kip funded the construction of the Anna Margaret Home for Convalescents, the main building of the new Morristown Memorial Hospital, in her honor. Kip died at his home in Morristown on June 27, 1926.
