= Peter Goelet =

- Born: January 5, 1727; New York City, Province of New York, British America
- Died: October 11, 1811 (aged 84); New York, United States
- Occupation(s): Merchant, real estate developer
- Spouses: Elizabeth Ratsey (m. 1755; died 1769) Mary Ludlow (m. 1770; died 1773) Elizabeth Farmer (m. 1775, died) Rachel Farmer (m. 1792)
- Children: 12
- Relatives: See Goelet family

Peter Goelet (January 5, 1727 – October 11, 1811) was a merchant and real estate entrepreneur of New York City.

== Early life ==
Peter Goelet was born on January 5, 1727, in New York City. He was the fifth of thirteen children born to Jan "John" Goelet (1694–1753) and Jannetje (née Cannon) Goelet (1698–1778), who married in 1718. Among his siblings was Raphael, Jacobus, Frans, Maria, John, and Catharine Goelet (wife of Peter Theobaldus Curtenius).

He was descended from a family of Huguenots of La Rochelle in France who, due to the Edict of Nantes, escaped in 1621 to Amsterdam. His paternal grandfather, Jacobus Goelet, was ten years old when he arrived in New York in 1676 with his widowed father, François "Francis" Goelet. Francis returned to Amsterdam on business, and left Jacobus in the care of Frederick Philipse (who became 1st Lord of Philipsburg Manor in 1693), but was lost at sea before his return. Peter's father was one of six children born to Jacobus Goelet and Jannetje (née Cossart) Goelet (daughter of Dutch-born Jacques Jacob Cossart). His maternal grandparents were merchant Jan Cannon and Mary (née Le Grand) Cannon.

== Career ==
Goelet was at first in partnership as a hardware merchant with his brother-in-law, Peter Theobaldus Curtenius, but from 1763 his place of business was Hanover Square, at the sign of the Golden Key. After their partnership dissolved, he moved his business to his residence at 113-115 Pearl Street, where he sold musical instruments, brushes, hardware, and cutlery.

In May 1775, he was elected a member of the Committee of One Hundred and the Committee of Correspondence in support of the American patriots. He used his profits from his merchant business, and the Revolutionary War, to buy real estate in Manhattan, later acquiring a wharf and yard on Exchange Slip, and establishing the Goelet family fortune.

In 1799, Goelet wrote to Alexander Hamilton regarding Gen. Philip Schuyler's purchase of lands from Robert Morris as a trustee of the American Iron Company.

== Personal life ==
Coat of Arms of Peter Goelet

In 1755, he married Elizabeth Ratsey (1734–1769) at Trinity Church in New York. Elizabeth was the daughter of another prominent New York merchant. Elizabeth inherited extensive lands around 14th Street. They were the parents of six children (two sons married daughters of wealthy Scottish merchant Thomas Buchanan, at one time a director of the United States Bank):

- Alice Goelet (1756–1793)
- Jannetje Goelet (1758–1840), who married Lt. Colonel Robert Troup of the Continental Army.
- John Goelet (1759–1853), who married Eliza Taylor Buncombe (1766–1840), daughter of Edward Buncombe.
- Peter P. Goelet (1764–1828), who married Almy Buchanan (1768–1848) in 1799.
- Elizabeth Goelet (1766–1856), who married William Cornelius Bucknor.
- Robert Ratsey Goelet (1769–1824), who married Margaret Buchanan.

After his first wife's death in 1769, Goelet remarried to Mary Ludlow (1734–1773), daughter of Henry Ludlow, Esq. of New York, on December 4, 1770. Before Mary's death in 1773, they were the parents of Mary Goelet (1773–1774), who died in infancy.

After the death of his second wife, Goelet remarried for a third time to Elizabeth Farmer, the daughter of Thomas Farmer and Sarah (née Billop) Farmer, who inherited the Bentley estate in Staten Island. Peter and Elizabeth, who married on October 26, 1775, had five children, Sarah, Thomas Billop, Mary, Catherine, and Christopher Billop Goelet. Elizabeth also died and Peter married her sister, Rachel Farmer, on February 1, 1792.

Goelet died in New York on October 11, 1811.

=== Descendants ===
His son, Peter P. Goelet, added to his real estate holdings and had four children, Peter (1800–1879), Jean Buchanan (1802–1882), Hannah Green (1806–1895), who married Capt. Thomas Russell Gerry, USN (a son of U.S. Vice President Elbridge Gerry), and Robert Goelet (1809–1879). Peter and for a time, his sister Hannah lived in a mansion on the northeast corner of Broadway and 19th Street, which grounds were known for peacocks, storks, and other exotic birds. Robert was the father of Robert Goelet and Ogden Goelet, who were both prominent in New York and grew the Goelet wealth further. Peter Goelet's great-grandson George Goelet Kip was also a prominent landowner in Manhattan and a business associate of his cousins Robert and Ogden.
