= Committee of Sixty =

The Committee of Sixty or Committee of Observation was a committee of inspection formed in the City and County of New York (Manhattan, New York City), in 1775, by rebels to enforce the Continental Association, a boycott of British goods enacted by the First Continental Congress. It was the successor to the Committee of Fifty-one, which had originally called for the Congress to be held, and was replaced by the Committee of One Hundred.

== Committee of Fifty-one ==
In response to the news that the port of Boston would be closed under the Boston Port Act, an advertisement was posted at the Coffee-house on Wall-street in New York City, a noted place of resort for shipmasters and merchants, inviting merchants to meet on May 16, 1774 at the Fraunces Tavern "in order to consult on measures proper to be pursued on the present critical and important situation." At that meeting, with Isaac Low as chair, they resolved to nominate a fifty-member committee of correspondence to be submitted to the public, and on May 17 they published a notice calling on the public to meet at the Coffee-house on May 19 at 1:00 pm to approve the committee and appoint others as they may see fit. At the meeting on May 19, Francis Lewis was also nominated and the entire Committee of Fifty-one was confirmed.

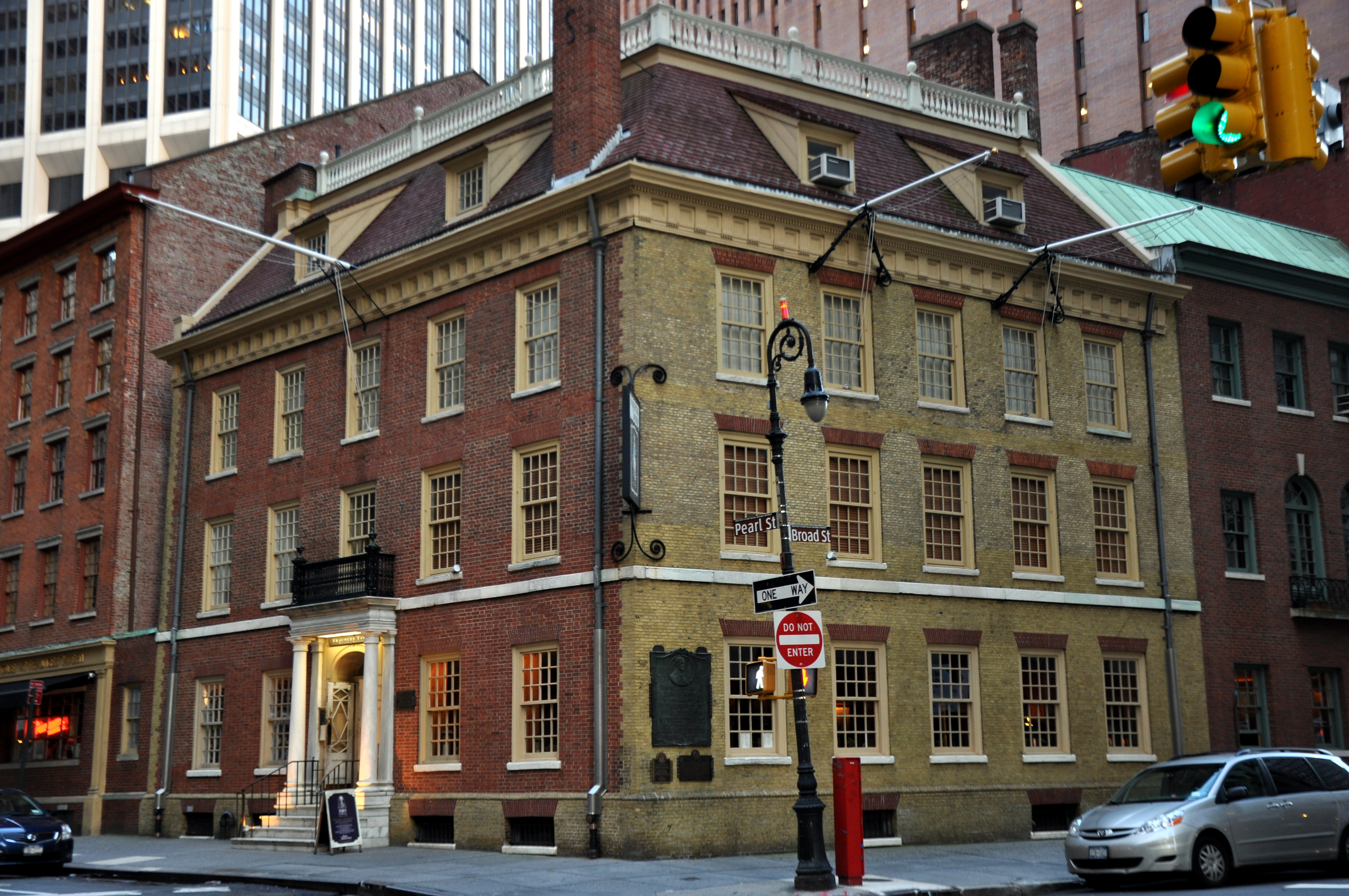
Fraunces Tavern in Lower Manhattan, meeting place of the "Committee of Fifty" on May 16, 1774

On May 23, the committee met at the Coffee-house and appointed Isaac Low as permanent chairman and John Alsop as deputy chairman. The Committee then formed a subcommittee which reported a letter in response to the letters from Boston, calling for a "Congress of Deputies from the Colonies" to be assembled (which became known as the First Continental Congress), which was approved by the committee. On May 30, the Committee formed a subcommittee to write a letter to the supervisors of the counties of New York to exhort them to also form similar committees of correspondence, which letter was adopted at a meeting of the Committee on May 31.

On July 4, 1774, a resolution was approved to appoint five delegates contingent upon their confirmation by the freeholders of the City and County of New York, and request that the other counties also send delegates. Isaac Low, John Alsop, James Duane, Philip Livingston, and John Jay were then appointed, and the public of the City and County was invited to attend City Hall and concur in the appointments on July 7. This caused friction with the more radical Sons of Liberty (Committee of Mechanics) faction, who held the Meeting in the Fields on July 6.

Three counties (Westchester, Dutchess and Albany) acquiesced to the five delegates, as did Ulster County but this was unrecognized by the congress, while three counties (Kings, Suffolk, and Orange) sent delegates of their own, and six counties were unresponsive. Albany County had appointed delegates of its own, but the New York County delegates were ultimately authorized to act in their stead. In Westchester County, meetings were held in the towns of Bedford, Mamaronee, Rye, and Westchester, and on August 22 a general county meeting at White Plains authorized the New York County delegates to act for the county. The action of Dutchess County is not very clear. Henry Wisner and John Haring were appointed on August 16 by the General Meeting of all the Committees of the County of Orange. As told by Joseph Galloway, a delegate from Pennsylvania, the appointment for the Kings County (now Brooklyn) delegate was made thusly: two persons assembled; one was made chairman, the other clerk; and the latter certified to the congress that the former, Simon Boerum, was unanimously chosen for the county of Kings. For Suffolk County, less is known about the appointment of William Floyd. In three meetings held in Ulster County, the New York County delegates were authorized to act for those present, if not the whole county; it's not usually included with Albany, Dutchess, and Westchester because congress received no credentials from that county authorizing the New York County delegates to act for it.

The First Continental Congress met from September 5 to October 26, 1774. Previous to this committee's formation, opposition to the British was organized through the informal leadership of the Sons of Liberty. From late 1774, the Committee exercised effective control of New York City, and declared that Boston was "suffering in defence of the rights of America".

== Committee of Sixty ==
On November 22, 1774 the Committee of Fifty-One and the Committee of Mechanics nominated a committee of inspection that was approved by the freeholders and freemen of the city at City Hall (about 30-40 people showed, according to Lt. Gov. Cadwallader Colden), known variously as the Committee of Sixty and/or the Committee of Observation, to carry the measures of the First Continental Congress into effect, i.e. the Continental Association, pursuant to the 11th resolution of the Congress.

This Committee issued a call to the counties of New York on March 15, 1775 to send delegates to a Provincial Convention in New York City on April 20, to elect delegates to the Second Continental Congress. On April 23, news of the battle of Lexington and Concord arrived. On April 26, Isaac Low called for the dismissal of the Committee of Sixty and the convening of a Provincial Congress, as well as a Committee of One Hundred to perform the function of the Provincial Congress until it was convened. On April 29, 1775 a mass meeting of residents signed a "General Association" whereby they agreed to obey the Continental Congress, the Committee of Sixty, and New York's Provincial Convention.

== Committee of One Hundred ==
The Committee of Sixty was replaced by a more representative Committee of One Hundred on May 1, 1775. By May 4, the city had four companies of volunteers. On May 15, the Continental Congress ordered the construction of a fort at Kings Bridge, the construction of batteries in the Highlands, and the arming and training of a militia.

The Committee of One Hundred still considered itself loyal to the British Crown, but was instead opposed to the laws of the Parliament of Great Britain which they considered unconstitutional because they had no representation in it. The committee wrote to Governor Cadwallader Colden in May, 1775 "that though they are arming with the greatest diligence and industry; it is not with design to oppose, but to strengthen government in the due exercise of constitutional authority". In May, all inhabitants were asked to sign an Association. Anyone who refused to sign were to be called "enemies of this country". Some of the Loyalists were tarred and feathered. The committee disarmed all loyalists within its jurisdiction. The Committee of One Hundred was officially replaced by the New York Provincial Congress which first convened on May 23, 1775, but the committee continued to meet for a while.

== See also ==
- Committee of safety
- Committee of correspondence
- Committee of inspection
