= Edmund Schermerhorn =

American businessman (1815–1891)

Edmund H. Schermerhorn
- Born: Edmund Henry Schermerhorn; December 5, 1815; New York City, New York, U.S.
- Died: October 1, 1891 (aged 75); Newport, Rhode Island, U.S.
- Resting place: Green-Wood Cemetery, Brooklyn
- Relatives: William Colford Schermerhorn (brother); Peter Schermerhorn (grandfather); James I. Jones (uncle); Abraham Schermerhorn (uncle); Caroline Schermerhorn Astor (cousin)

Edmund Henry Schermerhorn (December 5, 1815 – October 1, 1891) was an American businessman of New York's Dutch Schermerhorn family.

== Early life ==
Schermerhorn was born December 5, 1815, and lived in the Schermerhorn family mansion at the corner of Great Jones Street and Lafayette Place in Manhattan. His parents also had a country estate known as "Belmont Farm," overlooking the East River around 84th Street. He was a son of Peter Schermerhorn (1781–1852) and Sarah (née Jones) Schermerhorn (1782–1845). Along with his three brothers: John Jones Schermerhorn (who married a daughter of Mayor Philip Hone), Peter Augustus Schermerhorn (who married Adaline Emily Coster), and the lawyer and philanthropist William Colford Schermerhorn. His father was a prominent merchant and a director of the Bank of New York.

His paternal grandparents were Elizabeth (née Bussing) Schermerhorn and Peter Schermerhorn, a wealthy New York City merchant and land owner known as "Peter the Elder". Among his extended family was uncle Abraham Schermerhorn, the father of Caroline Schermerhorn Astor, who married William Backhouse Astor Jr. and became the leader of "The Four Hundred." On his mother's side, he was the grandson of John Jones and Eleanor (née Colford) Jones of Jones's Wood. His maternal uncle, Gen. James I. Jones, married his paternal cousin, Elizabeth Schermerhorn (Abraham's daughter and Caroline's sister). James and Elizabeth were the parents of Eleanor Colford Jones, who married Augustus Newbold Morris.

== Career ==
Schermerhorn was appointed Engineer in Chief of the State Militia on January 4, 1856. During the U.S. Civil War, Edmund, his brother William, and nephew Henry Augustus Schermerhorn (son of Peter Augustus) all took advantage of the loophole in the Enrollment Act of 1863, which allowed for drafted citizens to opt out of service by either furnishing a suitable substitute to take their place or paying $300, and found a substitute to take his place so he didn't have to fight.

Edmund devoted most of his time and energy to the management of his extensive family holdings. In 1872, Schermerhorn commissioned Detlef Lienau to remodel 67 Greenwich Street, a property acquired by his father in 1823 from Robert Dickey. Lienau removed the hipped roof and added the building's fourth floor.

== Personal life ==
Schermerhorn, who never married, died on October 5, 1891, at his home in Newport. His obituary in The New York Times read: "Edmund H. Schermerhorn died this afternoon at his cottage on Narragansett Avenue, in the seventy-fourth year of his age. He was among the most wealthy of the cottagers and probably the most eccentric. For six or seven years he had lived the life of a recluse, leaving his cottage only in a close carriage, and seeing only his servants and attendants. Before that he spent his Summers in Newport and his Winters in New York."

After a funeral at his Newport residence conducted by Rev. E. H. Porter of the Emmanuel Church, he was buried with his family at Green-Wood Cemetery in Brooklyn. Four years after his death, his estate still listed as one of the highest taxpayers in Newport at $40,500.

=== New York residences ===
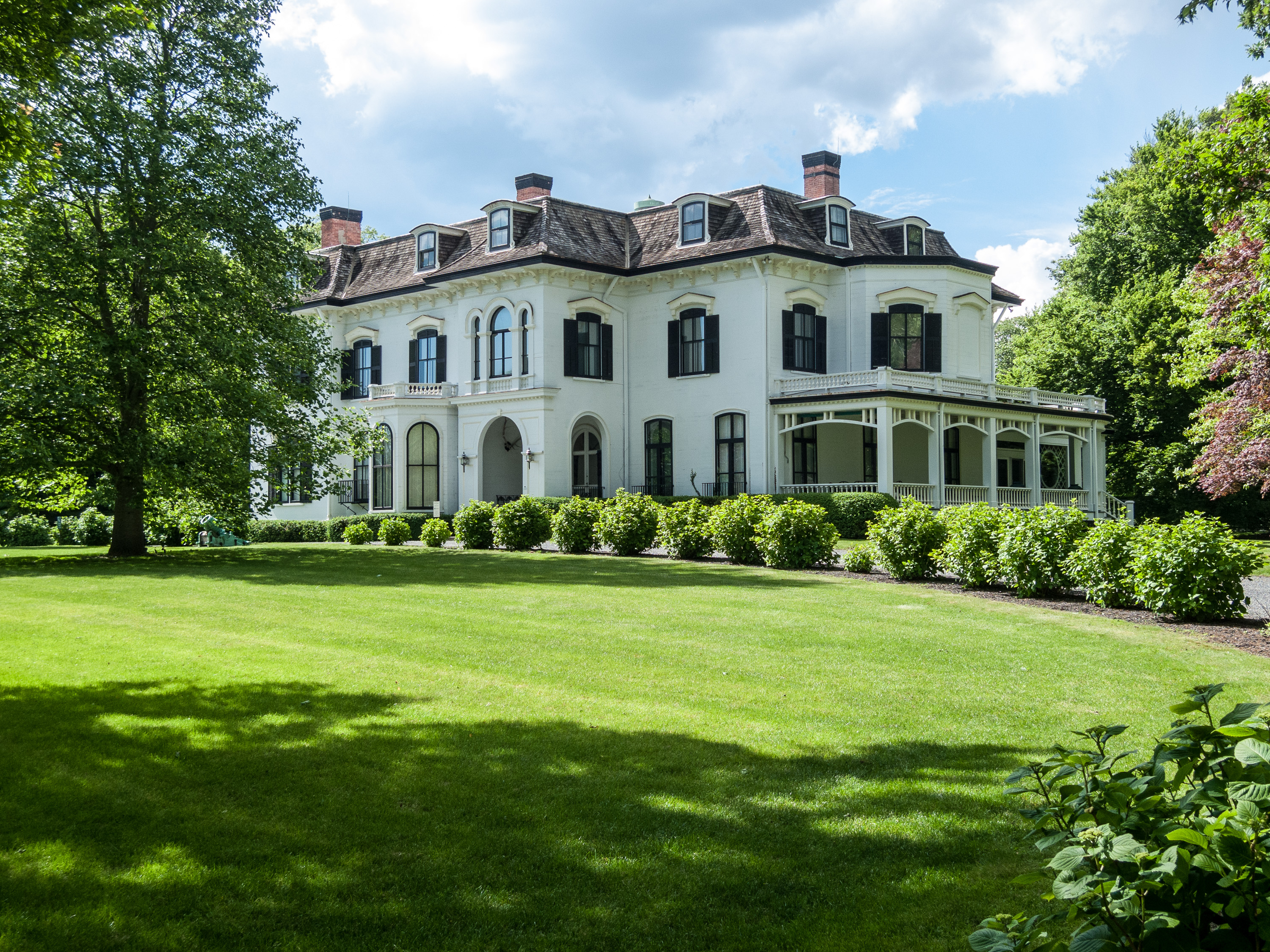
Schermerhorn's Newport estate, today known as Chepstow, June 2017

Edmund continued to live in the free-standing brick and brownstone mansion at 6 Great Jones Street after his parents' deaths along with his brother William and his wife, Ann, a society leader who threw a lavish costume ball at the home in 1854. By 1860, William and his family moved out of the mansion into a new house at 49 West 23rd Street, leaving Edmund alone in the mansion. Schermerhorn entertained in the Great Jones house, including prominent attorney George Templeton Strong who wrote about an afternoon musicale Edmund hosted there. After Edmund eventually moved out of the Great Jones Street mansion, it became a boarding house and then the Law School of Columbia University. In 1877, his brother William had the mansion torn down and hired architect Hardenbergh to design a commercial building on the site, known as The Schermerhorn Building, which remains to this day.

In 1869, fifty-three year old Edmund commissioned Detlef Lienau to build him a large residence at 45-47 West 23rd Street between Fifth and Sixth Avenues, next to his brother William's house which Lienau had also designed. Assisting Lienau on the project was Henry Janeway Hardenbergh, who later designed the Plaza Hotel and The Dakota, when Hardenbergh was just a student. In 1892, when Edmund's home was to be demolished and replaced with a commercial building, The New York Times described his home thusly:

"...it was always a conspicuous place. Its odd exterior marks it as a place to be noticed and remembered. The entrance is so modest, consisting simply of a small door on the street level, as to be almost a disfigurement, suggesting a place intended to be barred against intrusion rather than a way to reach a hospitable mansion. This impression is strengthened by the wide carriage entrance which adjoins the front door, over which an iron curtain has been securely fastened for many years. Another street doorway adjoins the carriage entrance at the east, but that belonged to a separate house in the same property, and it has never been opened for guests. The frontage of fifty feet which is to be cleared for business purposes was intended to provide another family home, but death interfered, and this section--the easterly one with twenty feet of frontage--was never finished except on the outside. The bachelor owner occupied the remaining forty feet of frontage as his home for a few years, when he abandoned it for a home in Newport, where he died a year ago. He never tried to get an income from it in any way, and to all appearances it has stood for years like a closed vault, which, indeed, it resembles more than a home."

A year after his death and less than a quarter of a century after it was built, his brother William, as his executor, had Edmund's New York City residence at 23rd Street torn down and replaced by an eight-story office building for the George C. Flint Furniture Co. with a front of Indiana limestone at 43 West 23rd Street (and later housing the Touro College Graduate School of Education and Psychology). Like the torn down mansion, the designer of the replacement building was H. J. Hardenbergh. After the death of his niece Fanny, his brother's mansion was also torn down and replaced by a commercial building.

=== Newport residence ===
In 1860, Schermerhorn commissioned prominent Rhode Island architect George Champlin Mason Sr. to design him an Italianate-style villa on Narragansett Avenue in Newport, Rhode Island. He willed his Newport villa to his brother William and his eldest daughter, Fanny Schermerhorn Bridgham. In 1911, the estate was acquired by Emily Lorillard (née Morris) Gallatin who renamed the property Chepstow.
