= Schermerhorn (disambiguation) =

Schermerhorn is a town in North Holland.

Schermerhorn may also refer to:

== People ==
- Abraham Schermerhorn (1783–1850), American merchant in New York City
- Abraham M. Schermerhorn (1791–1855), American politician from New York
- Alison Brie Schermerhorn, (born 1982), American actress
- Calvin Schermerhorn (born 1975), American historian
- Caroline Schermerhorn Astor (1830–1908), American socialite married to William Backhouse Astor, Jr.
- Charles Augustus Schermerhorn (1839–1914), American real estate investor and insurance executive
- Edmund Schermerhorn (1815–1891), American heir
- Eric Schermerhorn (born 1961), American guitarist and composer
- John F. Schermerhorn (1786–1851), American minister and missionary
- Kenneth Schermerhorn (1929–2005), American conductor and composer
- Peter Schermerhorn (1749–1826), merchant and ship owner
- Richard E. Schermerhorn (1927–1995), American politician from New York
- Simon J. Schermerhorn (1827–1901), American politician from New York
- Willem Schermerhorn (1894–1977), Dutch prime minister
- William Colford Schermerhorn (1821–1903), American attorney

== Places in New York City ==
- Hoyt–Schermerhorn Streets station, Brooklyn, New York City
- Schermerhorn Building 376–380 Lafayette Street, New York City
- Schermerhorn Hall at Columbia University, New York City
- Schermerhorn Row Block, New York City

== Other uses ==
- Schermerhorn–Drees cabinet, the cabinet of the Netherlands, 1945–1946
- Schermerhorn Symphony Center, a concert hall in Nashville, Tennessee
