= William Colford Schermerhorn =

American lawyer, philanthropist, and patron of the arts

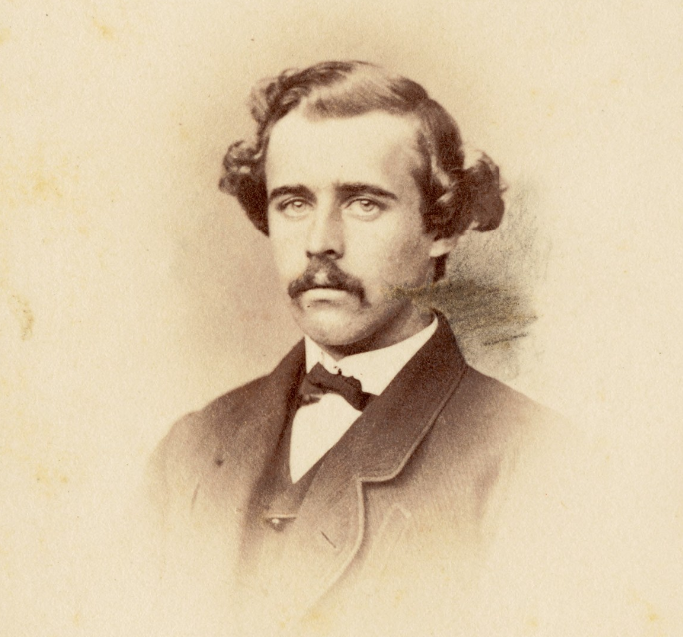
- Photograph of Schermerhorn, c. 1855 – c. 1865
- Born: June 22, 1821; New York City, New York, U.S.
- Died: January 1, 1903 (aged 81); New York City, New York, U.S.
- Resting place: Green-Wood Cemetery, Brooklyn
- Education: Columbia University (BA)
- Spouse: Ann Elliott Huger Cottonet (m. 1845)
- Children: 5
- Relatives: Edmund Schermerhorn (brother); Peter Schermerhorn (grandfather); James I. Jones (uncle); Abraham Schermerhorn (uncle); Caroline Schermerhorn Astor (cousin)

William Colford Schermerhorn (June 22, 1821 – January 1, 1903) was an American lawyer, philanthropist, and patron of the arts.

== Early life ==
Schermerhorn was born in New York City on June 22, 1821. He was the son of Peter Schermerhorn (1781–1852) and Sarah (née Jones) Schermerhorn (1782–1845). Among his siblings was older brothers John Jones Schermerhorn (who married a daughter of Mayor Philip Hone), Peter Augustus Schermerhorn (who married Adaline Emily Coster), and Edmund Schermerhorn.

His paternal grandparents were Elizabeth (née Bussing) Schermerhorn and Peter Schermerhorn, a wealthy New York City merchant and land owner known as "Peter the Elder". Among his extended family was uncle Abraham Schermerhorn, the father of Caroline Schermerhorn Astor, who married William Backhouse Astor Jr. and became the leader of "The Four Hundred." On his mother's side, he was the grandson of John Jones and Eleanor (née Colford) Jones of Jones's Wood, Manhattan. His maternal uncle, Gen. James I. Jones, married his paternal cousin, Elizabeth Schermerhorn (Abraham's daughter and Caroline's sister). James and Elizabeth were the parents of Eleanor Colford Jones, who married Augustus Newbold Morris.

Schermerhorn was educated in private schools in New York before attending Columbia College, where he graduated with honors in 1840 (alongside Robert Lenox Kennedy and Ogden Hoffman Jr.). Later, in 1860, Columbia awarded him an honorary A.M. degree and he was made a trustee of the college.

== Career ==
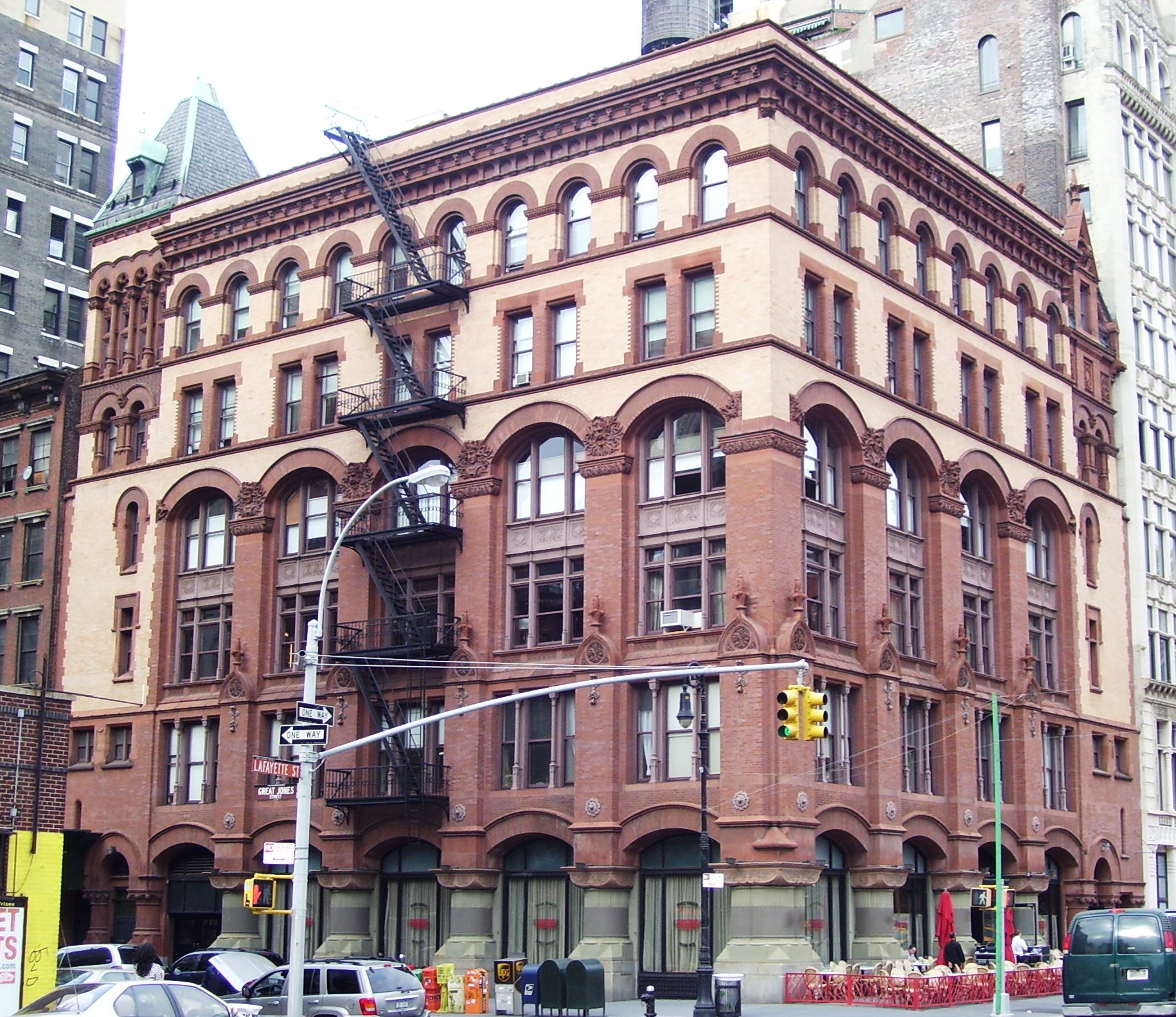
The 1888 Schermerhorn Building

After being admitted to the bar in 1842, he commenced the practice of law, with an office at 41 Liberty Street, where he managed the large Schermerhorn estate. He also served as a long-time trustee of the New York Life Insurance and Trust Company.

Schermerhorn also owned considerable real estate in New York and was "the most notable member of his generation of the family." After they moved away from their Lafayette Street home in 1860, he later decided to tear down the old family mansion and construct the Schermerhorn Building in 1888. The building was designed in the Romanesque Revival style by Henry Janeway Hardenbergh (who also designed the Plaza Hotel and The Dakota).

Schermerhorn devoted his life to public service as a patron of literature, arts and letters. He was a member of the American Museum of Natural History, the Metropolitan Museum of Art, and the American Fine Arts Society. He was a prominent member of the Grace Episcopal Church, serving as senior warden for a number of years. He was also member of the City Club, Metropolitan Club, Knickerbocker Club, Whist Club and the Columbia Alumni Association.

=== Columbia University ===
In 1893, he was elected chairman of the Board of Trustees of Columbia University. In the Spring of 1895, Schermerhorn and University President Seth Low, among others, oversaw the college's move from its old site on 49th Street to its current location in Morningside Heights. To outfit the new campus, Low donated a million dollars for the construction of a Library, and Schermerhorn followed with a $300,000 (equivalent to $11,610,000 today) donation. At the same time, his nephew (and godson), F. Augustus Schermerhorn, offered the Townsend Library of National Records to the university. Schermerhorn Hall, designed by McKim, Mead, and White, to the left of Low Memorial Library (on the Amsterdam Avenue side), along with its twin, Havemeyer Hall, was one of the original buildings on the uptown campus and was devoted to science, with laboratories and lecture rooms for botany, geology and physics.

== Personal life ==
On September 24, 1845, Schermerhorn was married to Ann Elliott Huger Cottonet (1825–1907) at Trinity Church. Her father was the French born Francis Cottenet, and her mother was Frances Caroline "Fannie" Laight, a daughter of Major General Edward William Laight of the New York State militia. Ann was also the aunt of Rawlins Lowndes Cottenet. In her youth, Ann was well known for her beauty, and after her marriage, she became prominent in New York Society. They first lived in the old Schermerhorn residence, on Lafayette Place and 4th Street, which Ann redecorated to resemble Louis XV's Versailles for a French-themed costume ball she gave in 1854 for six hundred New Yorkers, at which the German Cotillion was introduced in America. In 1860, Schermerhorn built the family a large new home at 49 West 23rd Street, which was known for its picture gallery and music rooms and was considered one of the handsomest residences in the city. Together, William and Ann were the parents of:

- Fanny Schermerhorn (1846–1919), who married Samuel W. Bridgham (1842–1915), a grandson of Samuel W. Bridgham, in Paris in 1869.
- Sarah Schermerhorn (1850–1903), who did not marry and had no children.
- Franklin Schermerhorn (b. c. 1855), who died in infancy.
- Simon P. Schermerhorn (b. c. 1857), who died in infancy.
- Annie Cottenet Schermerhorn (1857–1926), who married John Innes Kane (1850–1913), a great-grandson of John Jacob Astor. John was also the brother of DeLancey Astor Kane, Woodbury Kane, S. Nicholson Kane, and Sybil Kent Kane.

Schermerhorn died of pleurisy at his residence on 23rd Street in New York City on January 1, 1903. After a funeral at Grace Church conducted by Rector Dr. William R. Huntington, he was buried at Green-Wood Cemetery. He left his entire estate to members of his family, along with a $30,000 annuity to his widow. After his death, his family sold Schermerhorn's remaining portion land of Jones's Wood for $700,000 (equivalent to $25,083,333 today) to John D. Rockefeller for what became Rockefeller University.
