= Abraham Schermerhorn (disambiguation) =

Abraham Schermerhorn (1783–1850) was a prominent American merchant in New York City.

Abraham Schermerhorn may also refer to:

- Abraham M. Schermerhorn (1791–1855), a member of the U.S. House of Representatives and Mayor of Rochester, New York

== See also ==
- Schermerhorn (disambiguation)
