= Rawlins Lowndes Cottenet =

- Born: November 23, 1866; New York City, U.S.
- Died: March 29, 1951 (aged 84); New York City, U.S.
- Other name: "Bard of the Bulldags"
- Occupations: Florist, clubman
- Board member of: Metropolitan Opera Association
- Parent(s): Edward Laight Cottenet; Marie Huger Lowndes
- Relatives: Francis Cottenet (grandfather)

Rawlins Lowndes Cottenet or Rollie (November 23, 1866 – March 29, 1951) was a prominent socialite, composer, and member of the Metropolitan Opera Association's board of directors for forty-two years.

== Early life ==
Cottenet was born at the family home at Fifth Avenue and 10th Street in New York City, on November 23, 1866. He was the youngest son of six children born to Edward Laight Cottenet (1825–1884) and Marie Huger (née Lowndes) Cottenet (1835–1915). His siblings were Frances, Franklin, Sabina Elliot, Charles Lowndes, and Fannie Laight. His brother Charles, the designer of The Meadows, James Kernochan's house in Hempstead, New York, died in the hunting field of Meadow Brook Club.

His paternal grandparents were Francis Cottenet and Frances (née Laight) Cottenet. His grandfather came to the U.S. from France in 1822 and started an import-export business, Cottenet & Co., in New York. His grandfather built a grand country home, known as Nuits, in Ardsley-on-Hudson, New York. His paternal aunt, Anne E. H. Cottenet (1825–1907), was married to William Colford Schermerhorn (1821–1903), a cousin of Caroline Schermerhorn Astor. Through them, he was the first cousin of Annie Schermerhorn, who married John Innes Kane, in 1878, and Fanny Schermerhorn, who married Samuel Willard Bridgham, in 1869.

His maternal grandfather was Charles Tidyman Lowndes, who founded C.T. Lowndes & Co., an insurance agency in South Carolina. Through his mother, he was a descendant of Thomas Lowndes, a member of the U.S. House of Representatives, and Rawlins Lowndes, who served as the Mayor of Charleston and the President of South Carolina. His grand-uncle, also named Rawlins Lowndes (1801–1877), was married to Gertrude Livingston (1800–1883), the daughter of Maturin Livingston.

== Career ==
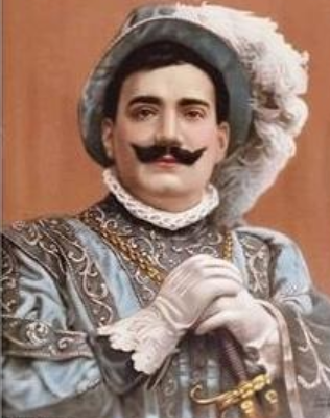
Enrico Caruso in the role of the Duke

In 1893, with his inherited wealth dwindling, he opened a florist shop called "The Rosary" in New York City, which became very successful. William "Willie" Tiffany was a business partner of his before he joined the Rough Riders. Upon Tiffany's death, Cottenet and Henry Worthington Bull served as pallbearers at his funeral in 1898.

The flowers were grown in the nursery of his estate in Old Westbury, which he bought from the estate of Belmont Purdy. The Rosary provided floral arrangements for many prominent weddings, including the wedding of Consuelo Vanderbilt to Charles Spencer-Churchill, 9th Duke of Marlborough, in 1895, and Gertrude Vanderbilt's wedding to Harry Payne Whitney, in 1896. In fact, Cottenet was not only the florist at the Whitney wedding, but an usher to Harry, one of his closest friends.

He provided the flowers for Anne Harriman Sands Rutherfurd's third marriage to William Kissam Vanderbilt in 1903, and was hired to "create evening musicales for the reopening celebration of the Vanderbilt mansion on Fifty-Second Street and Fifth Avenue."

Cottenet sold The Rosary in 1906.

=== Metropolitan Opera ===
In 1902, Cottenet heard Enrico Caruso singing at La Scala, and in November 1903, Caruso debuted as the Duke in Rigoletto at what was then known as the Conried-Metropolitan Opera Company, the precursor to the Metropolitan Opera. Cottenet was also an amateur composer.

From 1908 until his retirement in May 1950, he was a member of Metropolitan Opera Association's board of directors. He played a leading role in the development of singers and was credited with bringing Caruso, Arturo Toscanini, Giulio Gatti-Casazza and Diaghileff in coming to the United States to work. He served alongside Marshall Field (grandson of Marshall Field) and Cornelius Vanderbilt Whitney.

Among his friends were Fritz Kreisler, Josef Hofman, Efrem Zimbalist, and Jascha Heifetz.

=== Military service ===
During World War I, he served as a Lieutenant on the staff of Gen. William M. Wright. He was named an Officer of the Imperial Crown of Italy in 1919.

== Personal life ==
Neither Rawlins nor his sister Fannie married, but together they hosted many parties featuring prominent musicians at their apartment, which was featured in House and Garden magazine in 1922.

Cottonet died at his home, 555 Park Avenue in Manhattan, of bronchial pneumonia in March 1951. His sister died several years later in 1956.

=== Society life ===
Due to his family history and connections, Cottenet was prominent in New York and Newport society. In 1892, he was included in Ward McAllister's "Four Hundred" (along with extended cousin Clement March), purported to be an index of New York's best families, published in The New York Times. Conveniently, 400 was the number of people that could fit into Mrs. Astor's ballroom. He was also listed on the Ulta-fashionable Peerage of America, compiled by Charles Wilber de Lyon Nicholls, in 1904. The Cottenet's had a place in Lenox, Massachusetts that they used in the summers.

Cottenet was a member of the Meadow Brook Polo Club (where he was thrown from a horse in 1899), Knickerbocker Club, and was a founder of the Coffee House at 54 West 45th Street in Manhattan.
