= Clement March =

American soldier and New York City official

- Born: November 21, 1862; New York City, New York, U.S.
- Died: March 23, 1937 (aged 74); Kinderhook, New York, U.S.
- Parent(s): John Pyne March; Mary Livingston Lowndes March

Clement March (November 21, 1862 – March 23, 1937) was an American soldier and New York City official who was prominent in New York society during the Gilded Age.

== Early life ==
March was born at the home of his grandfather, 23 Fifth Avenue, on November 21, 1862. He was the son of John Pyne March, Esq. (1830–1873), a lawyer who attended but did not graduate from Columbia University, and Mary Livingston (née Lowndes) March (1831–1893). His elder brother, who was born in 1856, was Charles March. His mother's estate was valued at $1,000,000 upon her death in 1893.

His paternal grandfather was Charles March, whose ancestors came from England during the seventeenth century and settled in Portsmouth, New Hampshire, before moving to New York. His maternal grandparents were Major Rawlins Lowndes, a descendant of President of South Carolina Rawlins Lowndes (as well as the Middletons, Prestons, Hamptons and other prominent South Carolina families), and Gertrude (née Livingston) Lowndes, the daughter of New York City Recorder Maturin Livingston and granddaughter of New York Governor Morgan Lewis. Through the Lowndes family, he was related to Rawlins Lowndes Cottenet, another prominent member of New York society. Among his maternal aunts were Julia Livingston (née Lowndes) James, Anne (née Lowndes) Chase, Harriet (née Lowndes) Schuyler (the wife of Philip Schuyler).

== Career ==
During the 1904 to 1909 administration of Mayor George B. McClellan Jr. (son of Civil War General George B. McClellan), he served on the New York City Board of Education as well as on the board of managers of the House of Refuge on Randall’s Island (the first juvenile reformatory established in the United States.).

During World War I, March served in the Department of Military Intelligence where he was responsible for the translation of all important editorials in Spanish and Portuguese.

=== Society life ===
In 1892, March was included in Ward McAllister's "Four Hundred", purported to be an index of New York's best families, published in The New York Times. Conveniently, 400 was the number of people that could fit into Mrs. Astor's ballroom. March was considered a "perennial partner at Mrs. Astor's dancing parties."

== Personal life ==
For forty years, March lived in a brick townhouse at 25 North Washington Square. In c. 1925, he moved to Greenland, on Lindenwald Rd. in Kinderhook, New York.

March died at his home in Kinderhook, New York on March 23, 1937, after a "protracted illness." His funeral was held at St. Paul's Episcopal Church in Kinderhook and he was buried in St. James churchyard in Hyde Park, New York.
