= Mrs. William B. Astor House =

Demolished mansion in Manhattan, New York

Coordinates: 40.768078°N 73.970218°W

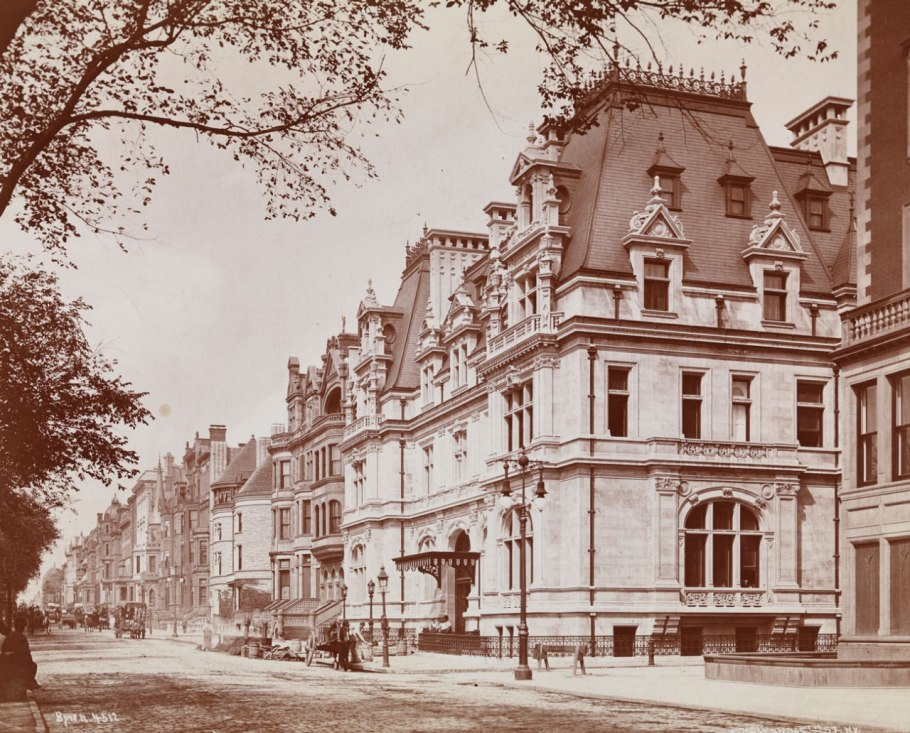
- The Astor mansion

General information
- Architectural style: Renaissance Revival architecture
- Location: Manhattan, New York City
- Opened: 1896
- Demolished: 1926

Design and construction
- Architect: Richard Morris Hunt

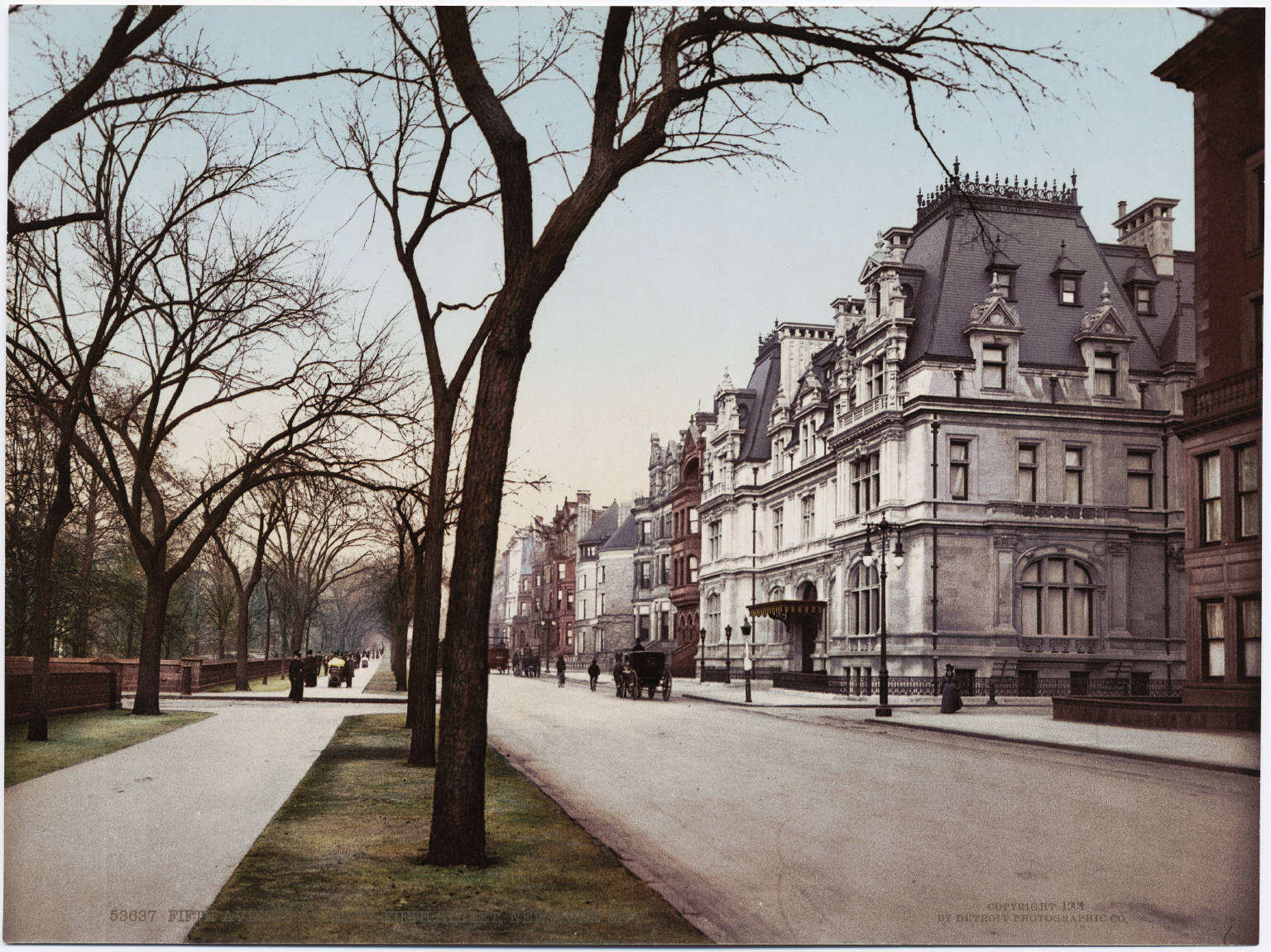
The view along Fifth Avenue

The Mrs. William B. Astor House was a mansion on the Upper East Side of Manhattan, New York City, at 840–841 Fifth Avenue on the northeast corner of 65th Street, completed in 1896 and demolished around 1926.

== History ==
The house was originally built as a double mansion for Caroline Schermerhorn Astor, the widow of real estate heir William Backhouse Astor Jr., and her son John Jacob Astor IV. Construction of this largest Fifth Avenue house started in 1894.

Caroline Astor lived in the northern half of the mansion (841 Fifth Avenue), while her son and his family lived in the southern half (840 Fifth Avenue). After she died in 1908, he converted the double mansion into a single home for his family.

The mansion was designed by Richard Morris Hunt, who used the early French Renaissance architecture from the period Louis XII and Francois I, in imitation of a château in the French Louis XII Style, revival of the Château de Blois.

The house was the setting for many parties and was a New York City attraction. The ballroom could hold 1,200 people, compared with 400 at Astor's previous mansion at 350 Fifth Avenue and 34th Street.

Following John Jacob Astor's death on the RMS Titanic in 1912, per his will, his new wife was forced to give up the home and it was transferred to John’s son, William Vincent Astor. However, William preferred his home on Long Island and sold the property to real estate developer Benjamin Winter Sr. It was demolished around 1926. Today, the temple of the Congregation Emanu-El of New York is located on the site.

== Architecture ==
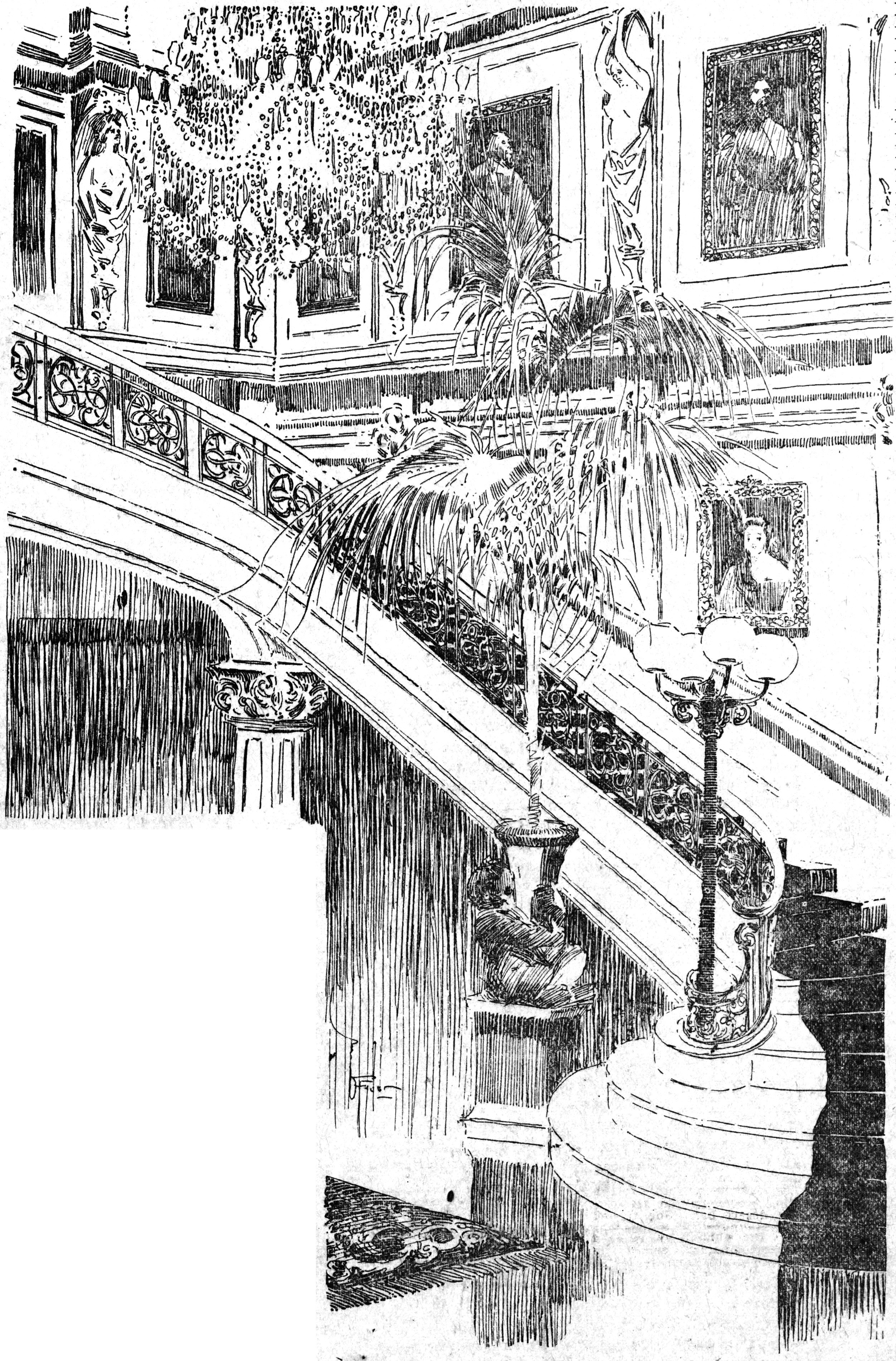
Caroline Astor's marble staircase at 841 Fifth Avenue

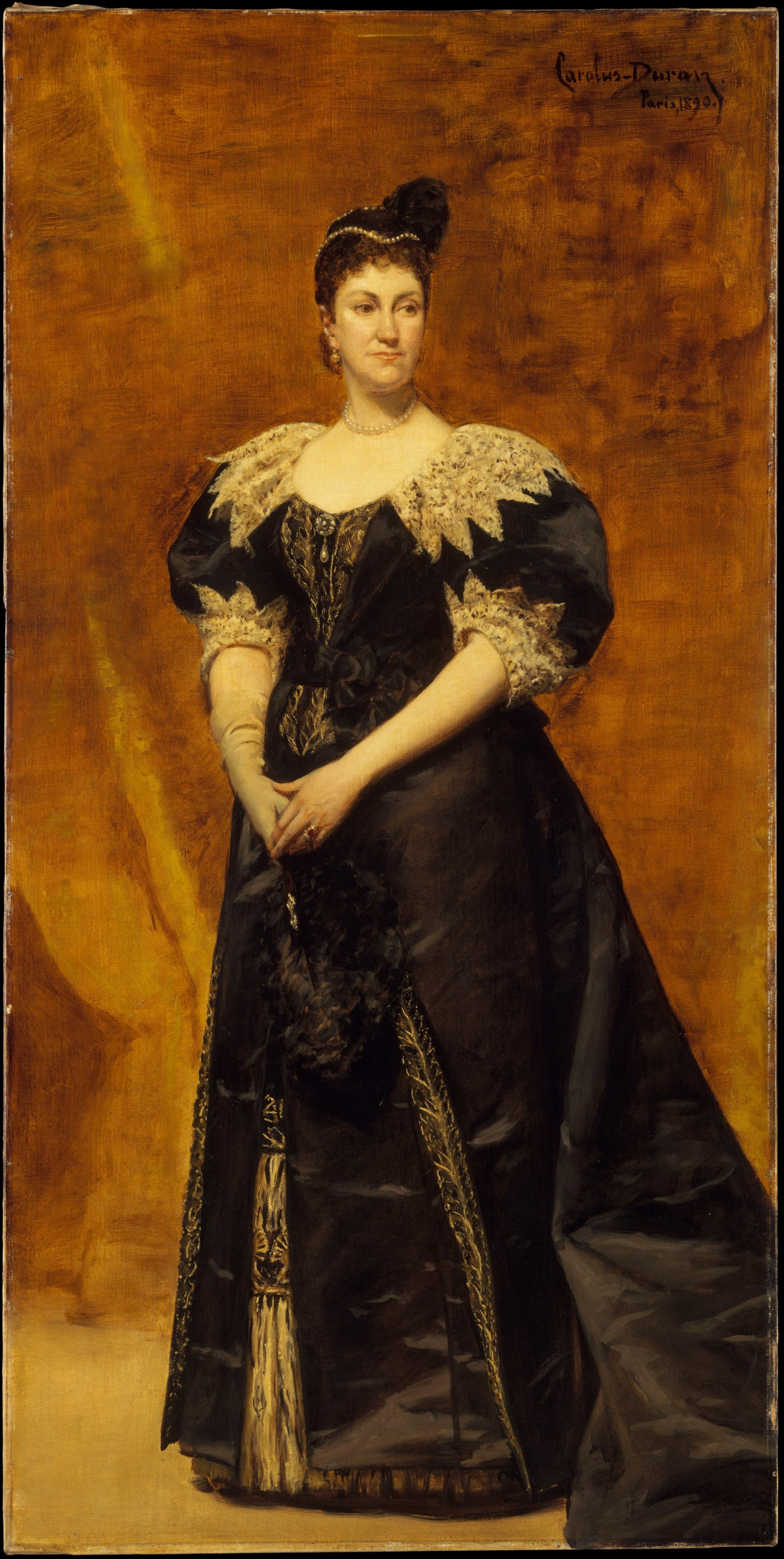
Portrait of Caroline Astor that hung in the house, by Carolus-Duran (1890)

=== Ground floor ===
The principal entrance to the house was through a domed vestibule, from which led a hall lined with busts of Astor's ancestors. This room, in turn, gave access to the marble great hall, from where rose a large cantilevered staircase. From the great hall, guests could enter the Adam style reception room, where they were received, on formal occasions, by their hostess standing beneath her own portrait by Carolus-Duran. At the end of the great hall was the entrance, flanked by two large vases and gold satin curtains, to the ballroom.

From the Great Hall, also led the Drawing Room, the walls of which were adorned with gilt-framed mirrors. The Drawing Room floor was laid with oriental carpets, large game rugs, and several others woven from feathers.

Also, off the Great Hall was the dining room, the black marble walls of which were hung with tapestries depicting hunting scenes. The room's black-and-white marble-tiled floor was covered with polar-bear rugs, all centered on the marble stoned chimney piece, the mantle of which displayed vases. The Dining Room was lit by a large crystal chandelier hung with satin draperies.

From the dining room, was the breakfast room, which contained Astor's tea-cup collection. This room also contained a small table covered with a red-and-white tablecloth and a small oriental vase filled with flowers.

=== Ballroom ===
The ballroom was the largest room of the house, spanning the entire rear of the house and rising four stories to the roof. It doubled as the art gallery; the satin-paneled walls were hung with Astor's famed art collection, while the marble herringbone floors were covered with four massive Oriental rugs and sixteen long narrow Persian rugs, all red. Colorful peacock-feathered woven rugs dotted the floor.

From the ceiling were suspended four large crystal chandeliers, each with several pearl strings linking from one to the other. At one end of the ballroom was a huge marble chimneypiece rising to the ceiling; this was decorated with two sculptures of male caryatids supporting a painted panel of a gala at the Palace of Versailles. At the opposing end, at second floor level, was a minstrels' gallery, where a wall of Chinese screens blocked the musicians' view of the room.

In front of the balcony was Astor's statue of Venus; around this were potted plants and a small marble waterfall. Before the fireplace stood Louis XVI style candelabra. Between the candelabra was a raised dais covered in fur blankets, on top of which was a red satin divan, upon which she sat. In between the divan were two small tables, topped by two marble horse heads. At the centre of the ballroom was placed a round, red velvet ottoman constructed around a large marble urn; matching this, arranged around the room were canapés and chairs.

=== Second floor ===
On the second floor was Astor's bedroom, domed boudoir, dressing room, bathroom, guest suite and closets.

The other floors contained the many guest and servants' rooms.

== See also ==
- List of Gilded Age mansions
- The Four Hundred (Gilded Age)
