= Peter Schermerhorn =

American businessman (1749–1826)

- Born: October 1, 1749; New York City, Province of New York, British America
- Died: January 28, 1826 (aged 76); New York City, New York, U.S.
- Burial place: Green-Wood Cemetery, Brooklyn
- Occupation: Merchant
- Spouse: Elizabeth Bussing (m. 1771; died 1809)
- Children: 6, including Abraham
- Relatives: Caroline Schermerhorn Astor (granddaughter); William Colford Schermerhorn (grandson)

Peter Schermerhorn (October 1, 1749 – January 28, 1826) was an American merchant and landowner in New York City. He was the father of Abraham Schermerhorn and the paternal grandfather of Caroline Schermerhorn Astor.

== Early life ==
Schermerhorn was born in New York City in what was then the Province of New York on October 1, 1749. His parents were Johannes "John" Schermerhorn (1715–1768) and Sarah (née Cannon) Schermerhorn (1721–1762). Among his siblings was brother Simon Schermerhorn (1748–1818), who married Jane Bussing (1750–1826), the older sister of Peter's wife Elizabeth.

His paternal grandparents were Arnout (or Aernout) Schermerhorn and Maria (née Beekman) Schermerhorn (b. 1692) (herself the granddaughter of Wilhelmus Beekman, Governor of the Colony of Swedes, acting Mayor of New York City and founder of the Beekman family in the United States). He descended from Jacob Janse Schermerhorn, who settled in New York from the Netherlands in 1636. His maternal grandfather, John Cannon, was a Huguenot refugee from La Rochelle in France.

== Career ==
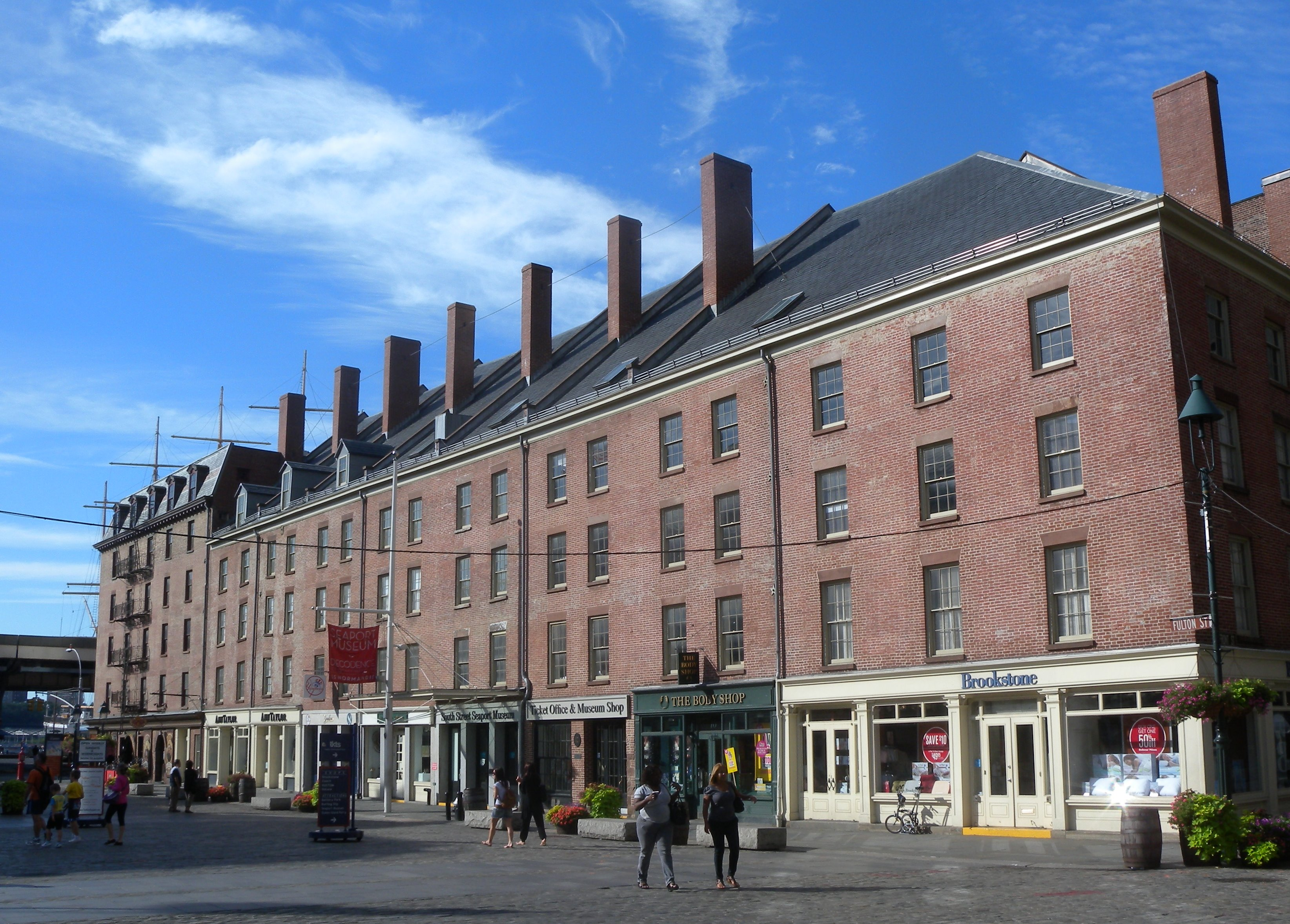
Part of Schermerhorn Row, early 19th-century mercantile buildings

Schermerhorn, like his father and grandfather, was a commander and owner of shipping vessels trading between New York City and Charleston, South Carolina. From 1776 to 1783, during the American Revolutionary War, Schermerhorn and his family lived in Hyde Park, New York to protect their vessels from British seizure. After the war ended, the family returned to New York City, the Schermerhorn family resided at 68 Broadway.

In 1808, Schermerhorn admitted his sons Abraham and Peter to his ship-chandlery firm, which was renamed "Peter Schermerhorn & Sons."

In 1811, Schemerhorn built six Federal style urban counting houses on Fulton Street in Manhattan, today known as the Schermerhorn Row Block. The houses were built to serve the growing South Street Seaport. Peter also served as a governor of New York Hospital.

== Personal life ==
On September 11, 1771, Schemerhorn was married to Elizabeth Bussing (1752–1809), a daughter of Abraham Bussing, a dry goods merchant, and Elizabeth (née Mesier) Bussing. Together, they were the parents of:

- John Peter Schermerhorn (1775–1831), who married to Rebecca Hodgson Stevens (1780–1815), the daughter of Gen. Ebenezer Stevens.
- Peter Schermerhorn Jr. (1781–1852), who married Sarah Jones (1782–1845), sister of Gen James I. Jones.
- Abraham Schermerhorn (1783–1850), who married Helen Van Courtlandt White (1792–1881), the daughter of Henry White and Anne (née Van Cortlandt) White.
- George Schermerhorn (b. 1785).
- Elizabeth Schermerhorn (1787–1857), who married Edward Renshaw Jones (1785–1839).
- Jane Schermerhorn (1792–1886), who married Rev. William Creighton, S.T.D.

Schermerhorn died in New York City on January 28, 1826.

=== Descendants ===
His third son Abraham had nine children, including Augustus Van Courtlandt Schermerhorn (1812–1846), who married Ellen Bayard, daughter of Sen. James A. Bayard Jr.; Elizabeth Schermerhorn (1817–1874), who married General James I. Jones; Anna White Schermerhorn (1818–1886), who married Charles Suydam; Helen Schermerhorn (1820–1893), who married John Treat Irving Jr., a nephew of Washington Irving; Katharine Elida Schermerhorn (1828–1858), who married Benjamin Sumner Welles, a descendant of Colonial Gov. Thomas Welles and Gov. Increase Sumner; and Caroline Webster Schermerhorn (1830–1908), who married William Backhouse Astor Jr., the middle son of William Backhouse Astor Sr.

Through his second son, Peter Schermerhorn Jr., William Colford Schermerhorn is his grandson. Another grandson, John Jones Schermerhorn would marry a daughter of Philip Hone.

=== Legacy ===
In 1795, Schermerhorn and his brother Simon purchased over 150 acres in Gowanus, Brooklyn, including a home built in 1690, that they used as a family summer home. After his death, he left his son Abraham the property which he later sold around 1835 for $600 an acre, (totaling $102,000) and which Green-Wood Cemetery was built on.
