= Augustus Newbold Morris =

American businessman (1838–1906)

- Born: June 3, 1838; Morrisania, New York, U.S.
- Died: September 1, 1906 (aged 68); Ridgefield, Connecticut, U.S.
- Education: Columbia University
- Spouse: Eleanor Colford Jones (m. 1862; died 1906)
- Children: 5
- Parent(s): William Henry Morris; Hannah Cornell Newbold
- Relatives: George Morris (grandson); Newbold Morris (grandson)

Augustus Newbold Morris or A. N. Morris (June 3, 1838 – September 1, 1906) was a prominent American during the Gilded Age in New York City.

== Early life ==
Morris was born on June 3, 1838 to William Henry Morris (1810–1896) and Hannah Cornell Newbold (1816–1842). His paternal grandparents were Helen (née Van Cortlandt) Morris (1768–1812) and James Morris (1764–1827), High Sheriff of New York. His grandfather was a son of Lewis Morris (1726–1798), signor of the Declaration of Independence, from the prominent Colonial-era Morris family of the Morrisania section of the Bronx.

== Career ==
Morris graduated from Columbia College in 1860, and later, Columbia Law School. He was considered a "man of leisure," but worked nevertheless. He was a manager of the Home for Incurables at Fordham, a director of the Zoological Society, and a vice-president of the Plaza Bank. While he did not hold office, he was considered an Independent Democrat.

=== Society life ===
In 1892, Morris and his wife were both included in Ward McAllister's "Four Hundred", purported to be an index of New York's best families, published in The New York Times.

He was a governor, and one of the founders, of the Metropolitan Club, a member of the Union Club of New York, member of the New York Young Republican Club, president of the Suburban Riding and Driving Club, president of the Ridgefield Club, a director of the Coney Island Jockey Club, a director of the National Horse Show Association, a member of the Riding Club, the Automobile Club, and the Delta Phi fraternity.

== Personal life ==
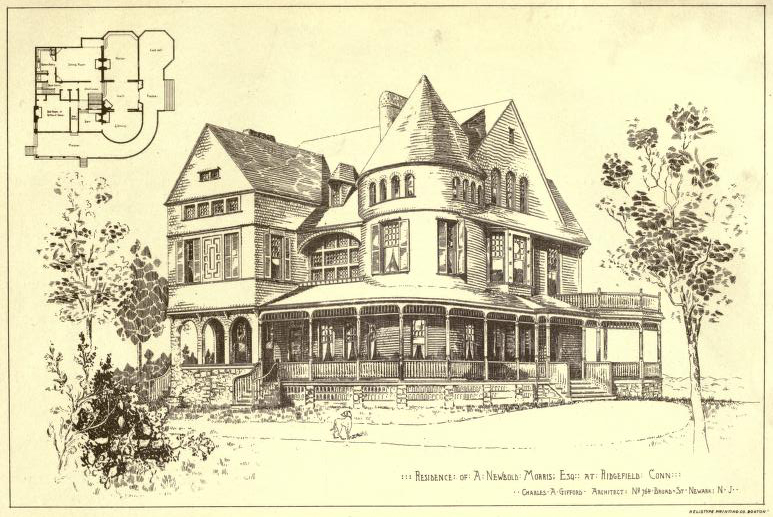
The 1885 Morris Residence in Ridgefield, Connecticut, designed by Charles Alling Gifford.

On December 10, 1862, Morris was married to Eleanor Colford Jones (1841–1906), daughter of General James I. Jones (1786–1858) and Elizabeth (1817–1874), the older sister of Caroline Schermerhorn Astor (1830–1908), also known as "The Mrs. Astor," Mrs. Charles Suydam, and Mrs. John Treat Irving. Her father's country home became Jones's Wood. They had three sons and two daughters. His wife died at their home, 19 East 64th Street, in April 1906, and Morris died shortly thereafter on September 1, 1906, at his country home in Ridgefield, Connecticut.

=== Descendants ===
Through his son Augustus, he was the grandfather of Augustus Newbold Morris (1902–1966), who was a lawyer, president of the New York City Council, and two-time candidate for mayor of New York City, George Lovett Kingsland Morris (1905–1975), a painter who married Suzy Frelinghuysen, and Stephanus "Stephen" Van Cortlandt Morris (1909–1984), a diplomat.
