= Schermerhorn Hall =

Academic building at Columbia University

Coordinates: 40°48′30.81″N 73°57′37.56″W

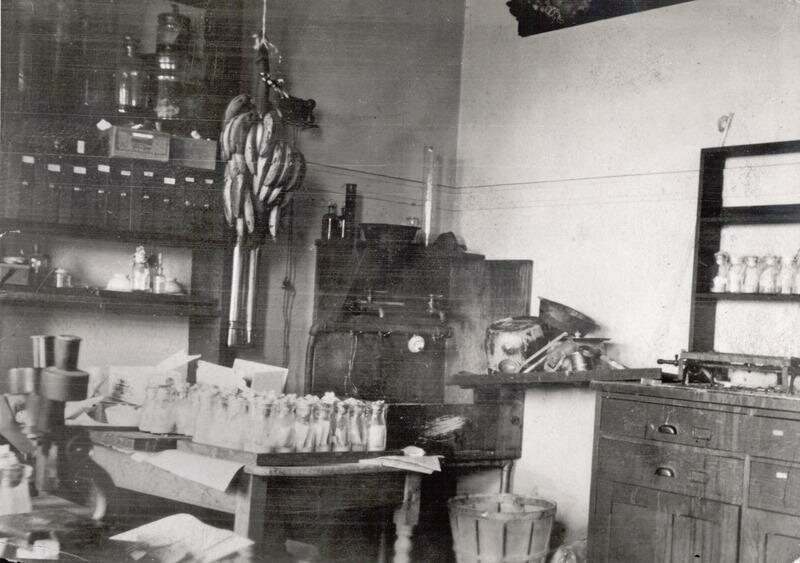
Thomas Hunt Morgan's Fly Room in the 1920s, 613 Schermerhorn Hall

Schermerhorn Hall (Dutch pronunciation: [ˈsxɛrmərˌɦɔr(ə)n]) is an academic building on the Morningside Heights campus of Columbia University located at 1190 Amsterdam Avenue, New York City, United States. Schermerhorn was built in 1897 with a $300,000 gift from alumnus and trustee William Colford Schermerhorn. It was designed by McKim, Mead & White, and was originally intended to house the "natural sciences". During the early 20th century, it was used for studying botany, geology, physics, mechanics, and astronomy. The inscription above the doorway reads, "For the advancement of natural science. Speak to the earth and it shall teach thee." Today, Schermerhorn Hall houses the Departments of Art History and Archeology, Earth and Environmental Science, and Psychology.

The famous Fly Room of evolutionary biologist Thomas Hunt Morgan was located in room 613, where Morgan studied the genetic characteristics of the fruit fly Drosophila melanogaster. His work in Schermerhorn would lead to his discovery of the role of genes in genetic inheritance, which earned him the 1933 Nobel Prize in Physiology or Medicine. During the Manhattan Project, Schermerhorn was used "for early 'pile' research and gaseous diffusion research and development and operation of a barrier production pilot plant."
