= Nuits (Irvington, New York) =

Historic house in New York, United States

- U.S. National Register of Historic Places
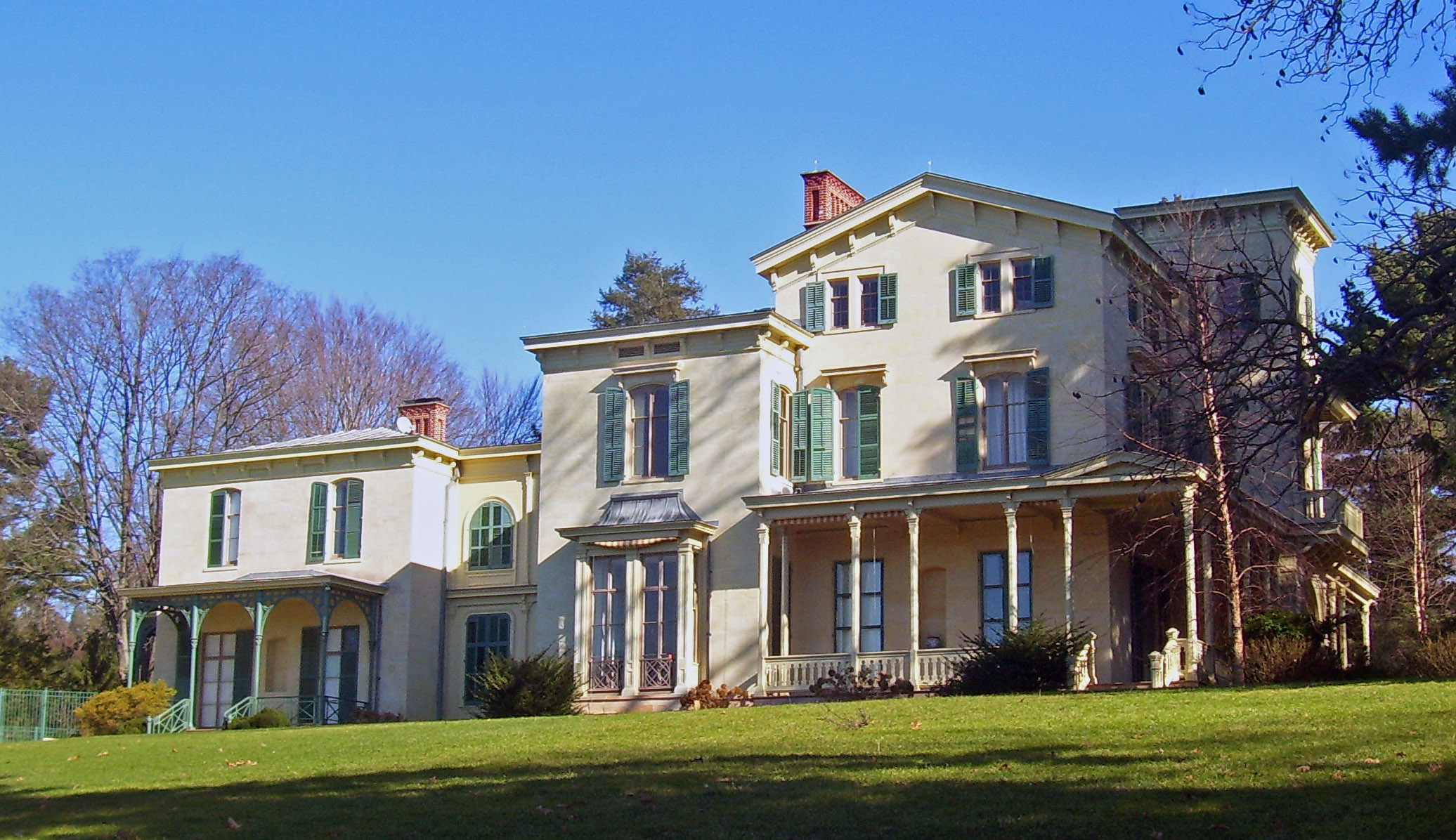
- West elevation, 2009
- Location: Ardsley-on-Hudson, NY
- Nearest city: Yonkers
- Coordinates: 41°01′27″N 73°52′25″W
- Area: 4.5 acres (1.7 ha)
- Built: 1852
- Architect: Detlef Lienau
- Architectural style: Italian villa
- NRHP reference No.: 77000986
- Added to NRHP: April 13, 1977

Nuits, also known as the Cottenet–Brown House, is an Italian villa-style house located in the Ardsley-on-Hudson section of the village of Irvington, New York, United States. It is a stone Italian villa-style house built in the mid-19th century. In 1977 it was listed on the National Register of Historic Places.

It is the only surviving example of the early residential architecture of Detlef Lienau. Built for Francis Cottenet, a wealthy New York merchant, it was later owned and renovated by Cyrus West Field, John Jacob Astor III and Manhattan College. It remains a private residence.

== History ==
Francis Cottenet, the first resident and owner of the property, came to the U.S. from France in 1822 and started an import-export business, Cottenet & Co., in New York. After 30 years, he contracted Detlef Lienau, one of a number of European-born architects working in America, to design a riverside villa for him. It was originally located on 65 acres (26 ha), the sole house between the Albany Post Road (now US 9) and the river in what has since become the Ardsley-on-Hudson section of Irvington.

Lienau insisted on French Caen limestone to be true to the appearance of its Continental models. Cottenet called on him again to remodel and expand the house in the late 1850s, just a few years after moving in. The locally based Lord and Burnham Company built the conservatory. The resulting structure was often pointed out to passengers on steamships going up the Hudson, with the implication that it was the ideally tasteful home of a man of wealth.

After Cottenet's death in 1884, it passed to another wealthy local, Cyrus West Field, who had to sell a year later due to some unexpected financial setbacks. During his brief ownership, he placed in the deed restrictions on the property's future use, banning it from being used for certain purposes, such as industry, education, or sale to "disreputable" individuals. These remain in place, and ensure that it has been used only as a residence ever since.

His buyer was John Jacob Astor III, who lived out the few years remaining in his life on the property. During that time, he managed to spend $100,000 on improvements, and built the stone gateway that still stands at Route 9 (now known as Broadway). His heirs sold the house to Manhattan College, which spent the next few years trying to clear Field's restrictions from the deed and convert the home to institutional use. Failing, the college sold to Amzi Lorenzo Barber, the "Asphalt King", a pioneer in paving as well as other businesses that would become prominent in the coming century. He sold off most of the surrounding acreage, clearing the way for the development of Ardsley-on-Hudson.

Since then, Nuits has been the home of Robert Hewitt, Jr., engineer John Wiley, Gillies Coffee Company owner James Henry Schmelzel, and investment banker Martin W. Dolan. A restoration which took almost 20 years was completed in 2000, and it was extensively renovated from 2000 to 2015.

As of June 2009 the property – which was bought in 2000 for $4.3 million – was being offered for sale for the price of $12.285 million, and in May 2015 was listed for $14.75 million, but by December 2017, the asking price had dropped to $11.5 million. In March 2021, it was again on the market for $6.5 million, and sold for 5.8 million in mid 2023.

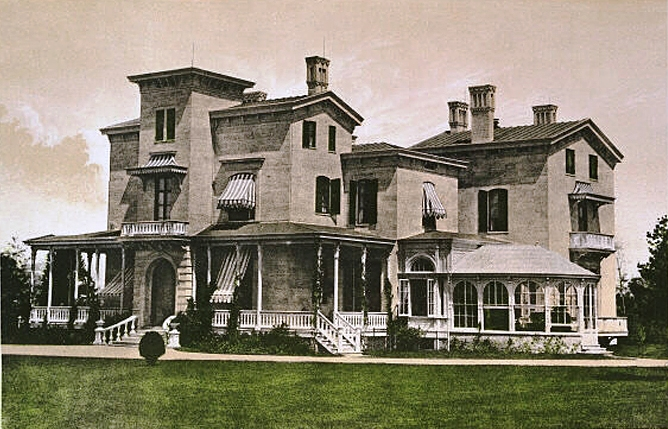
1860 photolithograph showing south profile and east elevation

== Building ==
Nuits is built in a sophisticated interlocking arrangement of cubes built of smooth-faced Caen stone, stones laid so tight that even over a century after it was originally laid it is impossible to put a penknife between them. The roofs are low-pitched with overhanging bracketed eaves.

The arched main entrance is located in the middle of the south elevation, a three-bay facade with central tower and balustraded balcony with hooded window above. It has been compared to the entrance John Notman designed for Princeton University's Nassau Hall after that structure was damaged by an 1855 fire. Verandas run the length of the south side.

On the east the most notable feature is an octagonal, conical-roofed conservatory that was added a few years later, and likewise the north elevation has had a billiards room, now used as a family room, added to it. The west, which overlooks the nearby Hudson River, is unchanged.

Inside, the entrance leads to a central hall that runs the length of the house. To its east is a library with French doors; opposite is the main living room.

According to the NRHP listing, there is only one outbuilding, a caretaker's cottage that was added later, which is considered a contributing resource to the property's historic character. However, a rest estate listing in 2021 included in the property a 1,200-square-foot (110 m^{2}) carriage house with three bedrooms.

According to the real estate listing when the house was put on the market in March 2021, the mansion has 14,296 square feet (1,328.1 m^{2}) of space, and features ten bedrooms – seven of which are master bedroom suites – nine full- and two half-baths, and 12 fireplaces. Some ceilings were 14-foot (4.3 m) high. The house was listed as being situated on 5 acres (2.0 ha) of property.

== See also ==
- National Register of Historic Places listings in southern Westchester County, New York
