= James I. Jones =

American military officer (1786–1858)

- Born: August 25, 1786; New York City, New York, U.S.
- Died: September 3, 1858 (aged 72); Basel, Switzerland
- Resting place: Green-Wood Cemetery, Brooklyn
- Spouse: Elizabeth Schermerhorn (m. 1838)
- Children: 3, including Eleanor

General James I. Jones (August 25, 1786 – September 3, 1858) was an American general who was prominent in New York life in the 1800s.

== Early life ==
Jones was born on August 25, 1786, in New York. He was the third son of John Jones (1755–1806) and Eleanor (née Colford) Jones (1755–1824), who were both of English descent. His elder brother, John Jones Jr., died without issue, and his younger sister, Sarah Jones, was married to Peter Schermerhorn (the uncle to James' eventual wife). James' cousin, Edward Renshaw Jones (the son of merchant Joshua Jones), was married to Elizabeth Schermerhorn (the aunt to James' eventual wife of the same name), and was the grandfather of Edith (née Jones) Wharton and Frederic Rhinelander Jones.

== Career ==
Jones "took an active and efficient interest in the military establishment of New York, in which he held the rank of major general of the third division of infantry." He was previously a Brigadier general with the 59th Brigade of Infantry. He also served as a trustee of the savings bank, the New York Life Insurance and Trust Company, the New York Hospital and was a vestryman of Trinity Church.

He was an ally of Philip Hone (the mayor of New York City from 1826 to 1827 today best known for his extensive diary) in the creation of Washington Square Park.

=== Jones's Wood ===
After his father's death in 1806, the family farm, known as Jones's Wood, was divided into lots among his Jones and his siblings, with James retaining the main house and its lot. James' sister Sarah, who had married the shipowner and merchant Peter Schermerhorn, received the parcel nearest to the city where the Schermerhorns first inhabited a modest villa overlooking the river at the foot of today's 67th Street. James and Peter controlled land beyond their shares as trustees for other family members. Later in life, Jones led the opposition to using his family's lands for the city's main park, thereby "paving the way for the creation of today's Central Park".

== Personal life ==
In 1838, Jones was married to Elizabeth Schermerhorn (1817–1874), a daughter of Abraham Schermerhorn and Helen Van Courtlandt (née White) Schermerhorn of the Van Cortlandt family. Elizabeth's younger sister was Caroline Schermerhorn (also known as the "Mrs. Astor"), who married William Backhouse Astor Jr. of the Astor family. Together, they resided at 5 Washington Place, located at the northeast corner of Washington Place and Mercer Street in New York City, which Jones built in 1842 and which became a "center of society comparable to Mary Mason Jones's home nearby on Broadway". James and Elizabeth were the parents of:

- Eleanor Colford Jones (1841–1906), who was married to Augustus Newbold Morris (1838–1906), a descendant of Declaration of Independence signor Lewis Morris, and who was a manager of the Home for Incurables at Fordham, a director of the Zoological Society, and a vice-president of the Plaza Bank.
- James Henry Jones (1846–1919), who graduated from West Point in 1868 and who did not marry.
- Cordelia Schermerhorn Jones (1849–1920), who married John Steward Jr. (1847–1943).

In 1839, Jones was sculpted by Thomas Crawford, who made numerous contributions to the United States Capitol. His wife's portrait was painted by Irish portrait painter Charles C. Ingham.

Jones died on September 3, 1858, in Basel, Switzerland. His widow Elizabeth died in Lenox, Massachusetts, in August 1874 and was buried alongside him in Green-Wood Cemetery, Brooklyn.

=== Descendants ===
Through his daughter Eleanor, he was the grandfather of Eleanor Colford Morris (1863–1863), who died young; Augustus Newbold Morris (1868–1928) who married Helen Schermerhorn Kingsland (granddaughter of New York City Mayor Ambrose Kingsland); Eva Van Cortlandt Morris (1869–1947), who married Emile McDougall Hawkes William Henry Morris (1871–1871), who also died young; and Lewis Morris (1873–1875), who also died young.
