= Schermerhorn Building =

- Building at 376–380 Lafayette Street
- U.S. National Register of Historic Places
- New York State Register of Historic Places
- New York City Landmark
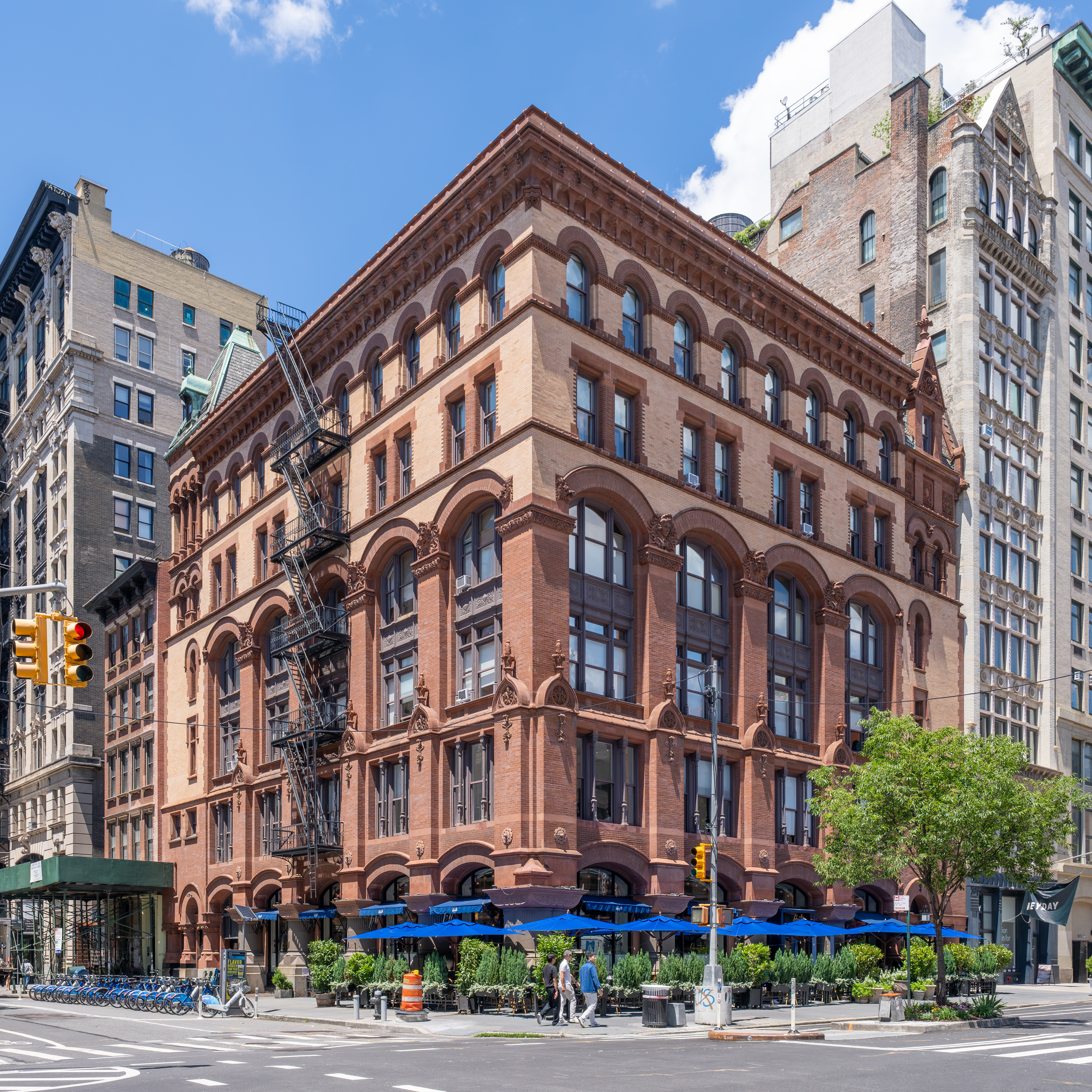

- Location within Lower Manhattan Location within New York Location within the United States
- Location: 376–380 Lafayette Street; Manhattan, New York City
- Coordinates: 40°43′38″N 73°59′41″W
- Built: 1888
- Architect: Hardenbergh, Henry Janeway
- Architectural style: Late Gothic Revival, Richardsonian Romanesque,Romanesque
- NRHP reference No.: 79001600
- NYSRHP No.: 06101.000107
- NYCL No.: 0193

Significant dates
- Added to NRHP: December 28, 1979
- Designated NYSRHP: June 23, 1980
- Designated NYCL: May 17, 1966

The Schermerhorn Building is a historic structure at 376–380 Lafayette Street, on the northwest corner with Great Jones Street, in the NoHo neighborhood of Manhattan in New York City. It was built in 1888–1889 by William C. Schermerhorn on the site of the Schermerhorn mansion, and rented by him to a boys' clothing manufacturer. The Romanesque Revival loft building was designed by Henry Hardenbergh, architect of the Plaza Hotel and The Dakota. The building is constructed of brownstone, sandstone, terra-cotta and wood, and has dwarf columns made of marble.

The building has been a New York City Landmark since 1966, and was added to the National Register of Historic Places on December 28, 1979.

== See also ==
- National Register of Historic Places listings in Manhattan below 14th Street
- List of New York City Designated Landmarks in Manhattan below 14th Street
