= Philip Hone =

American politician and businessman

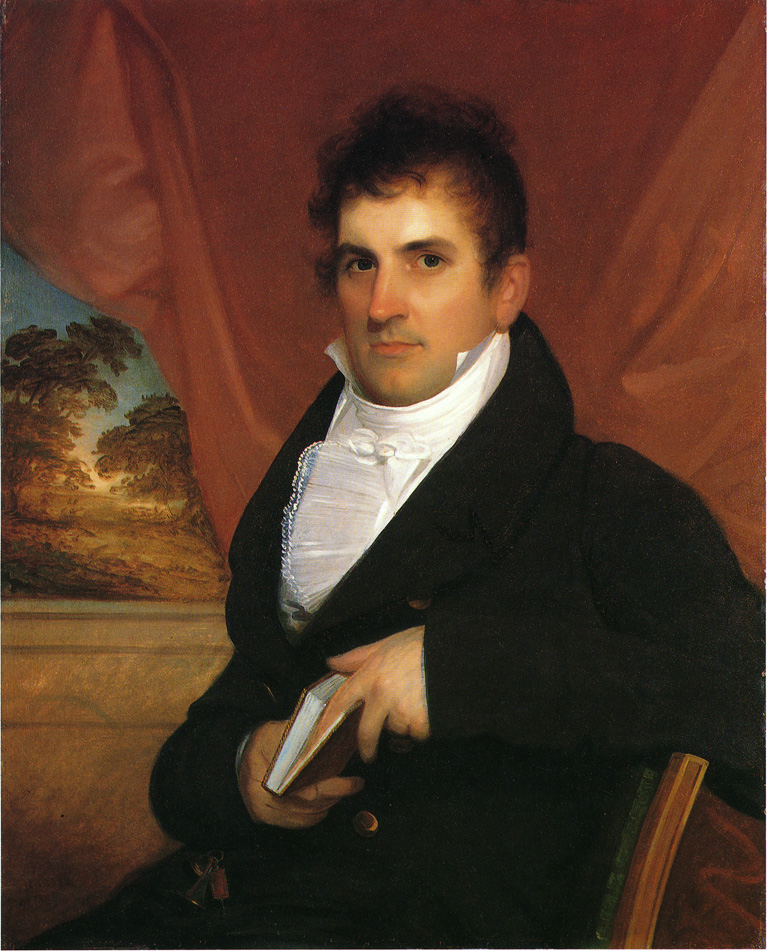
- Philip Hone, oil on canvas, John Wesley Jarvis, 1809. DeYoung Museum

58th Mayor of New York City
- In office 1826–1827
- Preceded by: William Paulding, Jr.
- Succeeded by: William Paulding, Jr.

Personal details
- Born: October 25, 1780 New York, New York, U.S.
- Died: May 5, 1851 (aged 70) New York, New York, U.S.
- Party: Federalist; Whig
- Spouse: Catharine Dunscomb
- Profession: Auctioneer, merchant, corporate president

Philip Hone (October 25, 1780 – May 5, 1851) was Mayor of New York City from 1826 to 1827. He was most notable for a detailed diary he kept from 1828 until the time of his death in 1851, which is said to be the most extensive and detailed history on the first half of 19th-century America.

== Early life ==
Hone was born in New York City on October 25, 1780. He was the son of Philip Hone (1743–1798), a German immigrant carpenter, and Esther (née Bourdet) Hone (1742–1798).

== Career ==
Hone first began working in the auction business, which made him wealthy. He was also a successful merchant and a founder of the Mercantile Library Association and he was the first president of the Delaware and Hudson Canal Company in 1825 and 1826.

He became very prominent in New York society and was friends with most of the political, artistic and scientific leaders of his day. Most notable among them were: Washington Irving, Samuel Morse, Daniel Webster, John Jacob Astor and U.S. Presidents John Quincy Adams and Martin Van Buren.

Hone's diary records not only his society engagements and the major events and spectacles in the city in the first half of the century, but also his view of a changing city: his disapproval of Andrew Jackson; the disconcerting effects of the city's constant construction; and his utter disgust with most Irish immigrants.

In 1827, he was elected into the National Academy of Design as an Honorary Academician. Hone lived in an elegant town house at 235 Broadway, opposite City Hall Park. The site was later one of those purchased by F. W. Woolworth for construction of the Woolworth Building.

=== Political career ===
Originally a Federalist, he was active as a member of the party's New York City committee and served as its secretary. In 1824, he was elected as an assistant alderman from the city's 3rd Ward, and in 1825 he was an unsuccessful candidate for alderman. He was elected mayor in 1826 and served one term. He later became active in the Whig Party.

During the Zachary Taylor administration, he served as Naval Officer of the Port of New York.

== Personal life ==
Hone was married to Catharine Dunscomb (1778–1850), the daughter of Daniel and Margaret Dunscomb. Catherine's sister, Margaret Bradford Dunscomb, was married to Robert Swartwout, the military officer, merchant, alderman, and Navy agent. Together, they were the parents of:

- John Philip (1812-1885)
- Mary S. (1814–1840), who in 1832 married John Jones Schermerhorn (1806–1876), a son of Peter Schermerhorn, brother of William Colford Schermerhorn, and grandson of Peter Schermerhorn.
- Robert Swartwout (1815–1898), who married Eliza Rodman Russell, a daughter of merchant Charles Handy Russell.
- Catherine (1819-1894), who married Richard Milford Blatchford (1798-1875) a U.S. Minister to the State of the Church, Member of the New York Assembly, and cousin of Richard M. Blatchford.

Hone died in New York City on May 5, 1851. He was buried at Saint Mark's Church in-the-Bowery.

=== Legacy ===
Honesdale, Pennsylvania, is named in honor of Philip Hone, as is Hone Avenue in the Bronx.

Political offices
Preceded by William Paulding Jr.	Mayor of New York City; 1826–1827	Succeeded by William Paulding Jr.
