= Abraham Schermerhorn =

American businessman and socialite

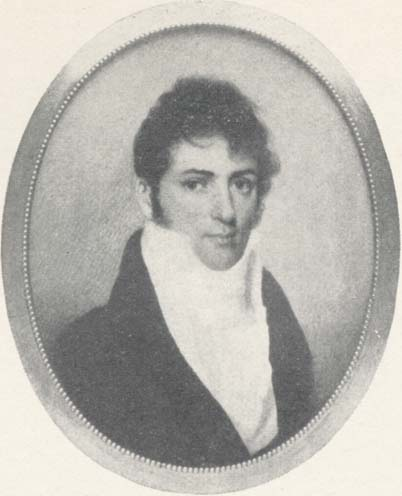
- Born: April 9, 1783; Hyde Park, New York, U.S.
- Died: February 3, 1850 (aged 66); New York City, U.S.
- Burial place: Green-Wood Cemetery, Brooklyn, New York, U.S.
- Occupation: Merchant
- Spouse: Helen Van Courtlandt White (m. 1809)
- Children: 9, including Caroline
- Parent(s): Peter Schermerhorn; Elizabeth Bussing
- Relatives: Van Cortlandt family (by marriage)

Abraham Schermerhorn (April 9, 1783 – February 3, 1850) was an American merchant in New York City, who was also prominent in social affairs. He was the father of Caroline Schermerhorn Astor, who married William Backhouse Astor Jr. of the Astor family.

== Early life ==
Schermerhorn was born on April 9, 1783, in Hyde Park, New York, and baptized in New York City shortly thereafter. He was the third son of merchant Peter Schermerhorn (1749–1826) and Elizabeth (née Bussing) Schermerhorn (1752–1809), who married in 1771. His brother, John P. Schermerhorn was married to Rebecca Stevens, the daughter of Ebenezer Stevens, and his sister, Jane Schermerhorn, was married to William Creighton.

His paternal grandparents were John Schermerhorn (1715–1768) and Sarah (née Cannon) Schermerhorn (1721–1762). Abraham's father Peter was the grandson of Maria Beekman (b. 1692) (herself the granddaughter of Wilhelmus Beekman, Governor of the Colony of Swedes, Acting Mayor of New York City and founder of the Beekman family in the United States). His maternal grandparents were Abraham Bussing, a dry goods merchant, and Elizabeth (née Mesier) Bussing. He was descended from Jacob Janse Schermerhorn, who settled in New York from the Netherlands in 1636.

== Career ==
Schermerhorn's father, like his grandfather and great-grandfather, was a commander and owner of shipping vessels trading between New York City and Charleston, South Carolina. From 1776 to 1783, during the American Revolutionary War, Schermerhorn and his family lived in Hyde Park, New York, to protect their vessels from British seizure. After the war ended, the family returned to New York City.

In 1808, Schermerhorn was admitted to his father's ship-chandlery firm, along with his brother Peter, which was renamed "Peter Schermerhorn & Sons."

In 1810, Schermerhorn and his brother Peter formed a new firm of "Schermerhorn & Co." while still retaining a connection with Peter Schermerhorn & Sons. Two more new companies were later formed, which he became involved with, including "Schermerhorn, Willis & Co." which was located at 53 South Street in New York City.

After his father's death, he inherited 160 acres in Gowanus, Brooklyn which he later sold around 1835 for $600 an acre, (totaling $102,000) and on which Green-Wood Cemetery was built.

Upon the birth of his youngest child, Caroline, in 1830, he was forty-seven years old and estimated to be worth over $500,000 (equivalent to $15,117,000 in 2025).

== Personal life ==
On September 12, 1809, Schermerhorn was married to Helen Van Courtlandt White (1792–1881). Helen, a very good friend of William Backhouse Astor Sr., was a daughter of Henry White (1763–1822) and Anne (née Van Cortlandt) White (1766–1814) of the Van Cortlandt family and a granddaughter of Augustus Van Cortlandt, a prominent Loyalist during the War who fled to England, where he died not long after. Together, they were the parents of nine children, including:

- Henry White Schermerhorn (1810–1811), who died young.
- Augustus Van Courtlandt Schermerhorn (1812–1846), who married Ellen Bayard (1827–1845), daughter of Sen. James A. Bayard Jr., in 1844.
- Archibald Bruce Schermerhorn (1814–1862), who did not marry.
- Elizabeth Schermerhorn (1817–1874), who married General James I. Jones (1786–1858).
- Anna White Schermerhorn (1818–1886), who married Charles Suydam (1818–1882), son of Ferdinand Suydam and Eliza Bartow Suydam.
- Helen Schermerhorn (1820–1893), who married John Treat Irving Jr. (1812–1906), a nephew of Washington Irving.
- Katharine Elida Schermerhorn (1828–1858), who married Benjamin Sumner Welles (1823–1904), a descendant of Colonial Governor Thomas Welles and Governor Increase Sumner.
- Caroline Webster Schermerhorn (1830–1908), who married William Backhouse Astor Jr. (1829–1892), the middle son of William Backhouse Astor Sr.

On February 6, 1829, his wife gave a fancy dress ball at their home, 1 Greenwich Street in New York. They lived there until about 1840, when they moved to 36 Bond Street, where he lived until his death. He was a pew-holder at Grace Church and was a member of the Union Club.

Schermerhorn died in Brooklyn, New York, on February 3, 1850. He was buried in Green-Wood Cemetery in Brooklyn. His widow died in 1881 in the 90th year of her life. Her funeral was held at Grace Church at the corner of Broadway and East 10th Street.

=== Descendants ===
Through his daughter Elizabeth, he was a grandfather of Eleanor Colford Jones (1841–1906), who was married to Augustus Newbold Morris (1838–1906), a descendant of Declaration of Independence signer Lewis Morris, and who was a manager of the Home for Incurables at Fordham, a director of the Zoological Society, and a vice-president of the Plaza Bank.

Through his daughter Anna, he was a grandfather of Charles Schermerhorn Suydam (1850–1887), Walter Lispenard Suydam (1854–1830), and Helen Suydam (1858–1919), who in 1883 married Robert Fulton Cutting (1852–1934) (brother of William Bayard Cutting).

Through his daughter Helen, he was a grandfather of John Treat Irving III (1841–1936), Cortlandt Irving (1844–1915), a lawyer, Helen Cordelia Irving (1846–1929), Frances Rogers Irving (1849–1912), Edward Irving (1854–1880), and Marion Harwood Irving (1860–1877).

Through his daughter Katharine, he was a grandfather of Benjamin Sumner Welles Jr. (1857–1935) and great-grandfather of Benjamin Sumner Welles III (1892–1961), the United States Ambassador to Cuba and United States Under Secretary of State during Franklin D. Roosevelt's administration.

Through his daughter Caroline, he was a grandfather of Emily Astor (1854–1881), who married James John Van Alen (1848–1923), a sportsman/politician, Helen Schermerhorn Astor (1855–1893), who married James Roosevelt Roosevelt (1854–1927), a diplomat and the elder half-brother of President Franklin Delano Roosevelt, Charlotte Augusta Astor (1858–1920), who married James Coleman Drayton and, later, George Ogilvy Haig, Caroline Schermerhorn "Carrie" Astor (1861–1948), who married Marshall Orme Wilson (brother of banker Richard Thornton Wilson Jr. and socialite Grace Wilson Vanderbilt), and John Jacob Astor IV (1864–1912), who married Ava Lowle Willing (1868–1958) and, later, married socialite Madeleine Talmage Force (1893–1940), before perishing aboard the Titanic in 1912.

=== Legacy ===
Schermerhorn Street in Brooklyn, and the New York City Subway's Hoyt–Schermerhorn Streets stop that serves Schermerhorn Street, was named in honor of Abraham and his brother Peter.
