= Jones's Wood =

Former location in Manhattan, New York City

Jones's Wood was a block of farmland on the island of Manhattan overlooking the East River. The site was formerly occupied by the wealthy Schermerhorn and Jones families. Today, the site of Jones's Wood is part of Lenox Hill, in the present-day Upper East Side of New York City.

== History ==
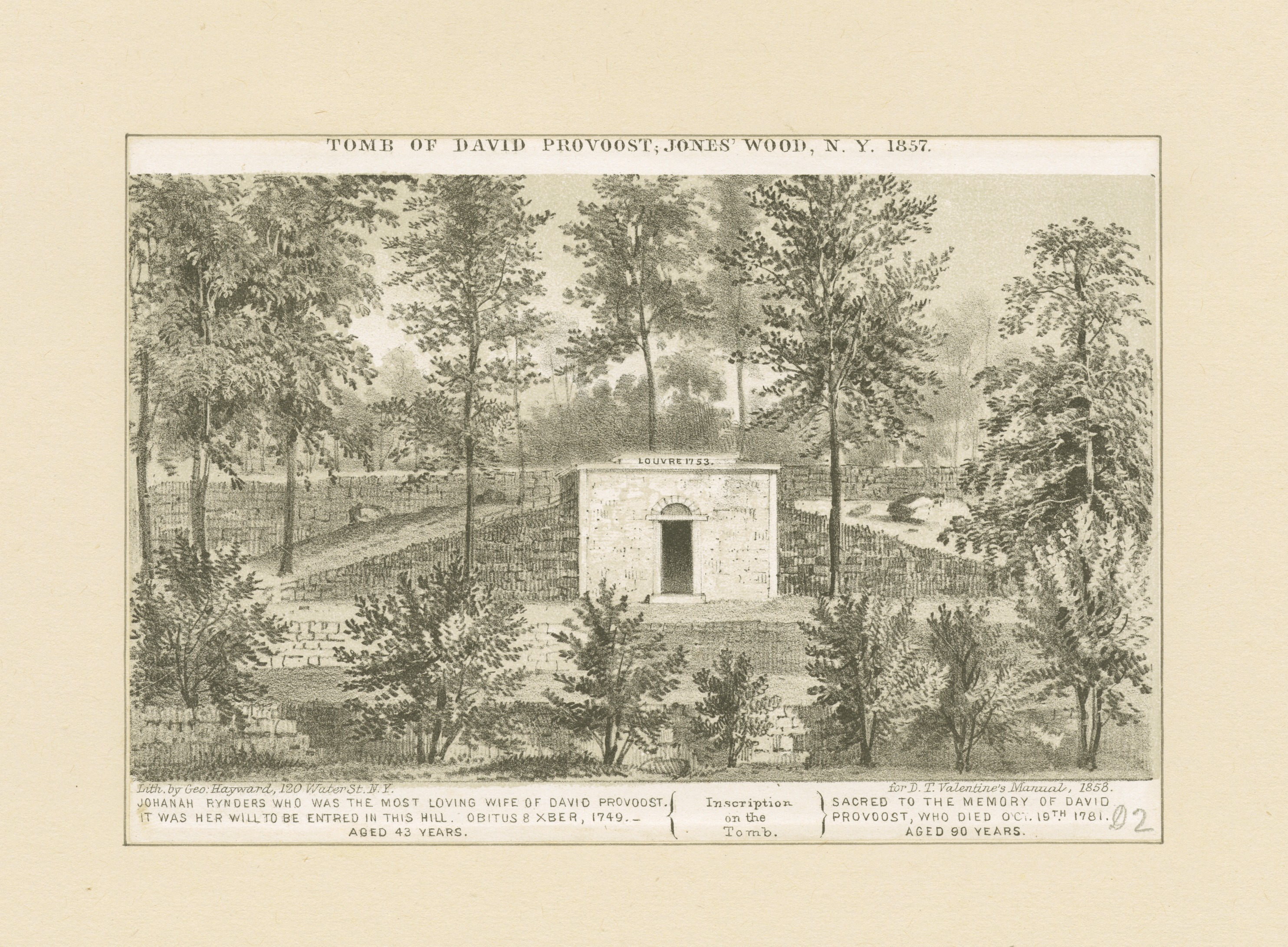
Tomb of David Provoost (1857)

The farm of 132 acres (53 ha), known by its 19th-century owners as the "Louvre Farm", extended from the Old Boston Post Road (approximating the course of Third Avenue) to the river and from present-day 66th Street to 75th Street. It was purchased from the heirs of David Provoost, the great-grandson of David Provoost. It was bought by the successful innkeeper and merchant John Jones, to provide himself a country seat near New York. The Provoost house, which Jones made his seat, stood near the foot of today's 67th Street. After his death the farm was divided into lots among his children. His son James retained the house and its lot. His daughter Sarah, who had married the shipowner and merchant Peter Schermerhorn on April 5, 1804, received Division 1, nearest to the city. On that southeast portion of his father-in-law's property, Peter Schermerhorn, soon after his marriage, had first inhabited the modest villa overlooking the river at the foot of today's 67th Street.

=== 19th century ===
In 1818, Peter Schermerhorn purchased the adjoining property to the south from the heirs of John Hardenbrook's widow Ann, and adding it to his wife's share of the Jones property—from which it was separated by Schermerhorn Lane leading to the Hardenbrook burial vault overlooking the river at 66th Street—named his place Belmont Farm. They at once moved into the handsomer Hardenbrook house looking onto the river at the foot of East 64th Street; there he remained, his wife having died on April 28, 1845. The frame house survived into the age of photography, as late as 1911. It survived an 1894 fire that swept Jones's Wood almost clear and remained while the first building of The Rockefeller Institute for Medical Research, now Rockefeller University, was erected to its south. The block of riverfront property now occupied by Rockefeller University is the largest remaining piece of Jones's Wood. The house was razed after 1903.

==== Bills to acquire as park ====
In 1850 Jones's Wood became the subject of suggestions for setting aside a large public park, which was eventually to result in the creation of Central Park. The first choice for the park's site was the wooded Jones/Schermerhorn estate on the East River. Intermittent editorials in Horace Greeley's New York Tribune and William Cullen Bryant's Post had offered rosy images of rural Jones's Wood. State senator James Beekman, who had a share in the grand Federal-style Beekman house between today's 63rd and 64th Streets that abutted the modest Hardenbrook-Schermerhorn villa, lobbied the city aldermen in 1850. A resolution was duly passed in 1851 to acquire the Jones's Wood property, which, the New York Herald said, "would form a kind of Hyde Park for New York".

When the Joneses and Schermerhorns proved reluctant to part with the property, Beekman introduced a bill into the state Senate to authorize the city to appropriate the land by eminent domain. Beekman's bill passed unanimously on June 18, 1851; it passed the Assembly as well, and the governor signed it into law on July 11. The proposal for paying for the improvements through a general assessment met stiff opposition, since half of the cost of Jones's Wood would be paid for through property assessments paid by all uptown property owners, including those who lived as far away as Harlem. Residents of Manhattan's West Side also objected for a different reason: it would be too far away for them to reach, compared to a centrally located park. Andrew Jackson Downing, one of the first American landscape designers and a strong advocate for Central Park stated that he would prefer a park of at least 500 acres (200 ha) at any location from 39th Street to the Harlem River. In any case, the Jones and Schemerhorn heirs subsequently brought a lawsuit and successfully obtained an injunction to block the acquisition, and the bill was later invalidated as unconstitutional.

The clamorous arguments fought in the newspapers over a city park then shifted to proposals for the modern day Central Park. Another suggestion was to enlarge the existing Battery Park, a move endorsed by most of the public but opposed by wealthy merchants. As a compromise, New York City's aldermen also voted to expand Battery Park to 24 acres (9.7 ha). Even as the coalition to build Central Park grew, supporters of Jones's Wood Park continued to advocate for the site's acquisition, though there were still disputes even within this group. Landowner James Crumbie wanted the southern border to be set at 66th Street so that his property would directly abut the park, while the Schermerhorns wanted the southern border two blocks north at 68th Street so their land would not be taken. State senator Edwin Morgan introduced another bill to acquire Jones's Wood in 1852, but the bill died after Morgan shifted his support to the Central Park plan.

As support for Central Park increased, advocates for Jones's Wood Park, such as nearby landowner James Hogg and the then-incipient New York Times, claimed that Central Park's supporters were motivated by property speculation. Central Park had a wider coalition of support than Jones's Wood Park did. This was partially because of the former's central location, and partially because the site of Central Park was inhabited by a low-income community called Seneca Village, which, Central Park's supporters claimed, needed to be redeveloped. Supporters of Jones's Wood Park continued to lobby for their site, using increasingly misleading tactics to do so. During the 1853 session of the New York State Legislature, Beekman convinced both state senators and assemblymen to reconsider the Jones's Wood bill, and then bribed a court clerk to prevent media from reporting on the vote. Hogg held interviews with several newspapers to ensure media support for Jones's Wood Park, though there was considerable prejudice from newspapers on both sides of the debate. These papers created petitions to support each position, and the petitions each gained at least 20,000 signatures, but ten percent of these were said to have been falsified. The general public was mostly apathetic to the dispute as long as the result was a large city park.

The dispute peaked in mid-1853 when Beekman and Morgan presented competing bills that respectively advocated for Jones's Wood and Central Park. Unlike the 1851 act, Beekman's amended bill would not take property assessments into consideration, which was seen as a move to retain support from neighboring landowners. Both bills ultimately passed, but after the passage of the Jones's Wood bill, Beekman amended it so that the city was obligated to take the land for Jones's Wood rather than merely creating a commission to examine the feasibility of doing so. The Schermerhorns and Jones sued to stop the bill from taking effect, and New York Supreme Court judge James I. Roosevelt invalidated the second Jones's Wood bill in January 1854, to the consternation of Beekman and other Jones's Wood supporters.

==== Jones's Wood Hotel ====
Peter Schermerhorn died on June 23, 1852, and during the next decade the Jones and Schermerhorn cousins soon discovered that though they had retained possession of their landscaped estate, the pressures of the city's inexorable northward growth soon hemmed them on two sides. Casual pilferage of fruit from their orchards and the presence of German beer gardens along the Post Road at the gates of their shaded country lane encouraged them to lease a portion of the land for a commercial picnic ground and popular resort hotel, the Jones's Wood Hotel; the hotel extended the old Provoost house, adding a dance pavilion, shooting range and facilities for other sports. Jones's Wood became the resort of working-class New Yorkers in the 1860s and 70s, who disembarked from excursion steamers and arrived by the horsecars and then by the Second Avenue Railroad, to enjoy beer, athletics, patriotic orations and rowdy entertainments that were banned by the prim regulations of the city's new Central Park.

Valentine Mager, the proprietor, pointedly advertised in The New York Times on April 25, 1858, that his grounds (enlarged by additional leases from Joneses and Schermerhorns) were "on the whole, the only place on the Island where a person can enjoy or make himself comfortable." Here the Caledonian Society repaired for Highland games, and the daredevil Charles Blondin performed, who "sought out perilous localities, eligible for his performance, in various parts of the Republic; and, among other famous spots, Jones's Wood—a sort of wild and romantic Vauxhall or Cremorne, on the banks of the Hudson," George Linnaeus Banks (Blondin: his life and performances, 1862, p. 42) had it, slightly misplacing the riverside site. Thomas Francis Meagher's address to the "Monster Irish Festival" at Jones's Wood on August 29, 1861, was memorable enough for excerpts to be printed among inspiring exemplars of oratory in Beadle's Dime Patriotic Speaker (1863, p. 55).

The northern section of the Louvre Farm, as the families still termed it, from 69th to 75th Streets, was divided into lots in 1855, advertised to the public as part of the "beautiful property so well known as Jones's Wood" and sold for residential development.

The year 1873 marked the last of the old Wood, as trees were being felled to allow for construction. Several proprietors succeeded to the leases of the amusement park, and John F. Schultheis, who had purchased some Schermerhorn lots outright, erected his "Colisseum" about 1874. It occupied the full frontage on Avenue A (now York Avenue) between 68th and 69th Streets, providing an entrance to Jones's Wood, and extended over most of the ground towards the river. It had seating for 14,000 spectators. To the north, Schultheis established a second picnic ground, which he called "Washington Park." Below the bluff, right on the river's edge, a single-story Greek Revival structure behind a colonnade, alleged by a New York Times journalist to have been a riverfront chapel erected by the Schermerhorns for Sunday services for their neighbors along the river, was rented as a bathing house by the Pastime Athletic Club in 1877; they remained there for twenty years, while Schultheis gradually raised their annual rent from $180 to $1250, then decamped for 90th Street and the East River.

"Jones's Wood, the general and inclusive term for the neighborhood, was razed by fire in 1894", Hopper Striker Mott recorded in 1917. "At break of day on May 16th the East River bluffs from 67th to 71st Street were practically swept of buildings". The fire covered 11 acres (4.5 ha). Fifty horses perished in the stables, and the "Silver King" fire engine was overtaken by flames and incinerated. The Jones house, occupied by John F. Schultheis, Jr, was burnt, but the Schemerhorn house, standing in the path of 67th Street, was spared. On the site now stand several institutions: Weill Cornell Medical Center and the Hospital for Special Surgery.

=== 20th century ===
In 1903 John D. Rockefeller purchased the remaining block of the Schermerhorn farm, which had already been subdivided into about 110 lots, preparatory to sale, and extended from 64th Street to 67th Street, and from Avenue A to the newly plotted "Exterior Street", for $700,000. 65th Street and 66th Street had never been cut through the property and were de-mapped. The projected Exterior Street along the river was subsumed into today's FDR Drive. This is the site today of Rockefeller University.

By 1911, "The Schermerhorn country place at Jones Wood, where until recently also there was a Schermerhorn residence, is now the site of model tenements. The real estate holdings of the family rank about third in the scale of those having ownership for two centuries," stated Town & Country on May 26, 1911, exaggerating by about a century. The name of Jones's Wood was retained in Jones Wood Gardens, an ultra-exclusive private garden established in 1920 at 65th and 66th Streets between Third and Lexington Avenues. The garden only had twelve keys, and was meant for the residents of 157-167 East 65th Street and 154-166 East 66th Street, a group of thirteen row houses built by Edward Shepard Hewitt in 1920.
