= Caroline Schermerhorn Astor =

American socialite (1830–1908)

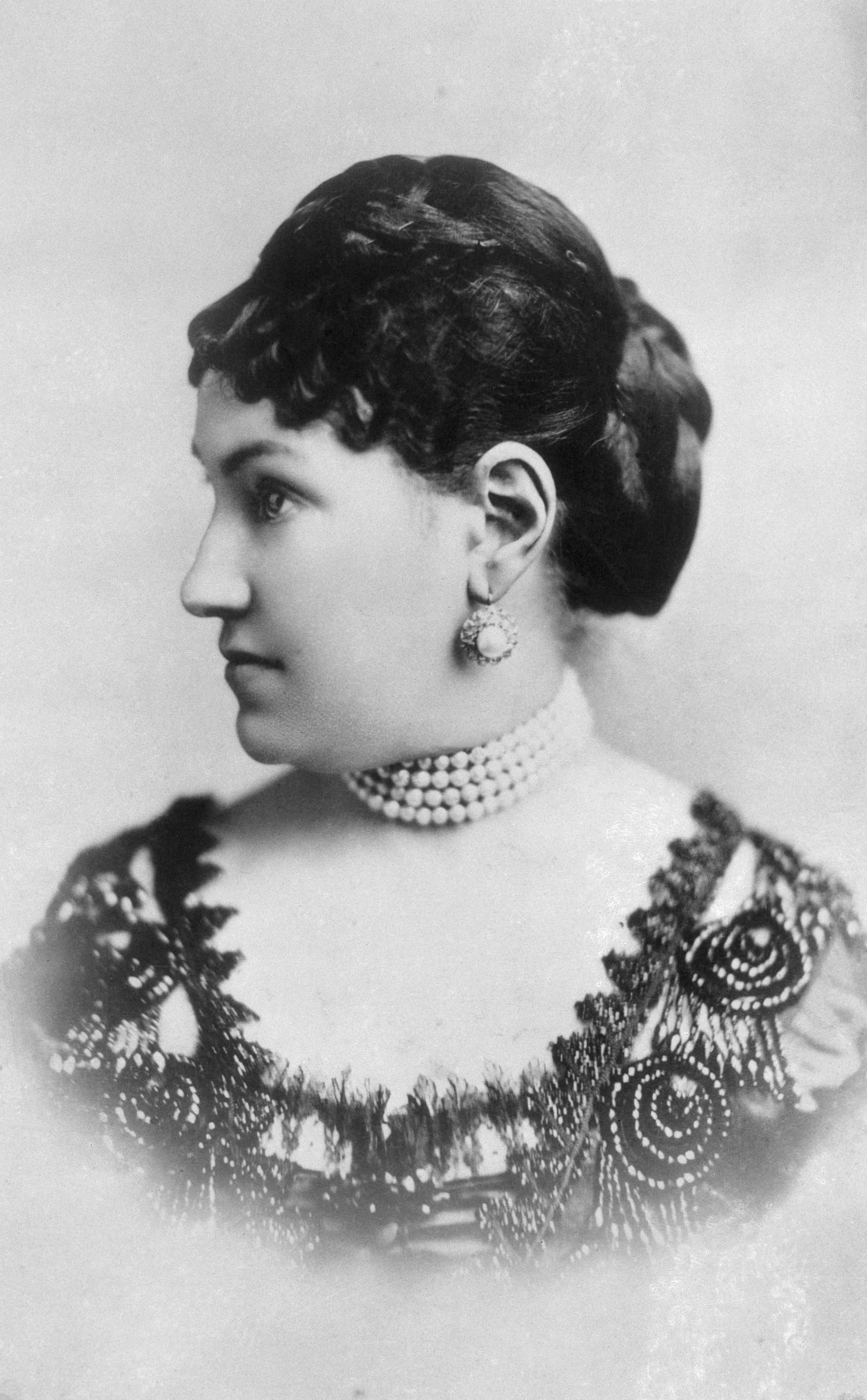
- An illustration of Astor, c. 1853–1860
- Born: Caroline Webster Schermerhorn; September 22, 1830; New York City, United States
- Died: October 30, 1908 (aged 78); New York City, United States
- Burial place: Trinity Church Cemetery
- Known for: self-proclaimed "the Mrs. Astor", matriarch of the American Astors, leader of The Four Hundred
- Spouse: William Backhouse Astor Jr. (m. 1853; died 1892)
- Children: 5, including Charlotte, Carrie, and John
- Parents: Abraham Schermerhorn; Helen Van Courtlandt White
- Relatives: Astor family

Caroline Webster "Lina" Schermerhorn Astor (September 22, 1830 – October 30, 1908) was an American socialite who led the Four Hundred, high society of New York City in the Gilded Age. Referred to later in life as "the Mrs. Astor" or simply "Mrs. Astor", she was the wife of yachtsman William Backhouse Astor Jr. They had five children, including Colonel John Jacob Astor IV, who perished on the RMS Titanic. Through her marriage, she was a member of the Astor family and matriarch of the American Astors.

== Early life ==
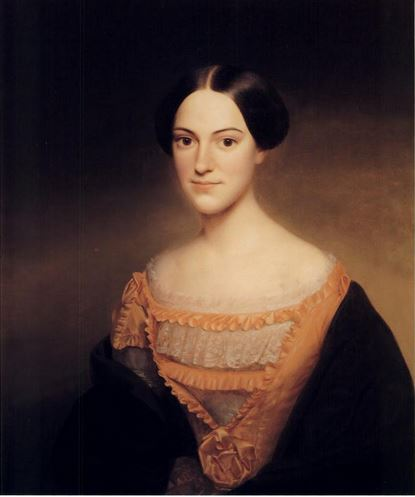
Portrait of Caroline Webster Schermerhorn in 1860

Caroline Webster Schermerhorn, called "Lina", was born on September 22, 1830, into a wealthy family who were part of New York City's Dutch aristocracy, descendants of the city's original settlers. Her father, Abraham Schermerhorn (1783–1850), and the extended Schermerhorn family were engaged in shipping. At the time of Lina's birth, Abraham was worth half a million dollars (equivalent to $15.12 million in 2025). Her mother was Helen Van Cortlandt (née White) Schermerhorn (1792–1881). Lina was the couple's ninth child. Her older sister Elizabeth married General James I. Jones, who owned a vast farm in upper Manhattan called Jones's Wood.

Her maternal grandparents were Henry White Jr. and Anne (née Van Cortlandt) White of the Van Cortlandt family while her paternal grandparents were Peter Schermerhorn and Elizabeth (née Bussing) Schermerhorn. Among her extended Schermerhorn family was first cousin William Colford Schermerhorn, the father of Annie Schermerhorn Kane, wife of John Innes Kane (a great-grandson of John Jacob Astor).

At the time of her birth, her family lived at 1 Greenwich Street, near the Bowling Green, but the population growth and increasing urbanization of lower Manhattan in the 1830s led her family to move farther north to 36 Bond Street, near the fashionable Lafayette Place, which had been developed by her future husband's paternal grandfather, fur-trader John Jacob Astor. Young Lina was educated at a school run by Mrs. Bensee, a French emigrée. There, she learned to speak French fluently.

== Marriage and family ==
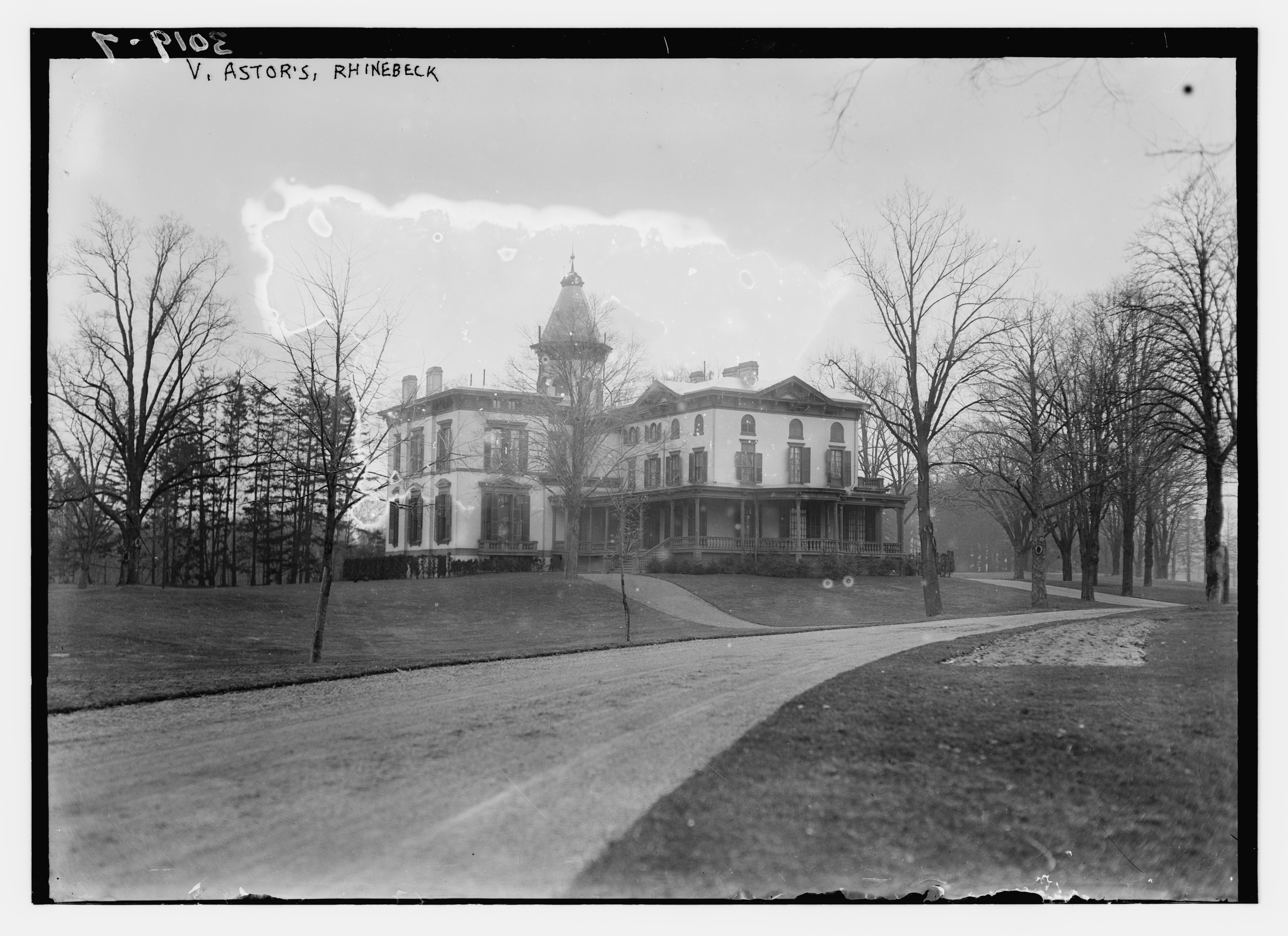
Ferncliff, the Astor family's country estate in Rhinebeck, New York

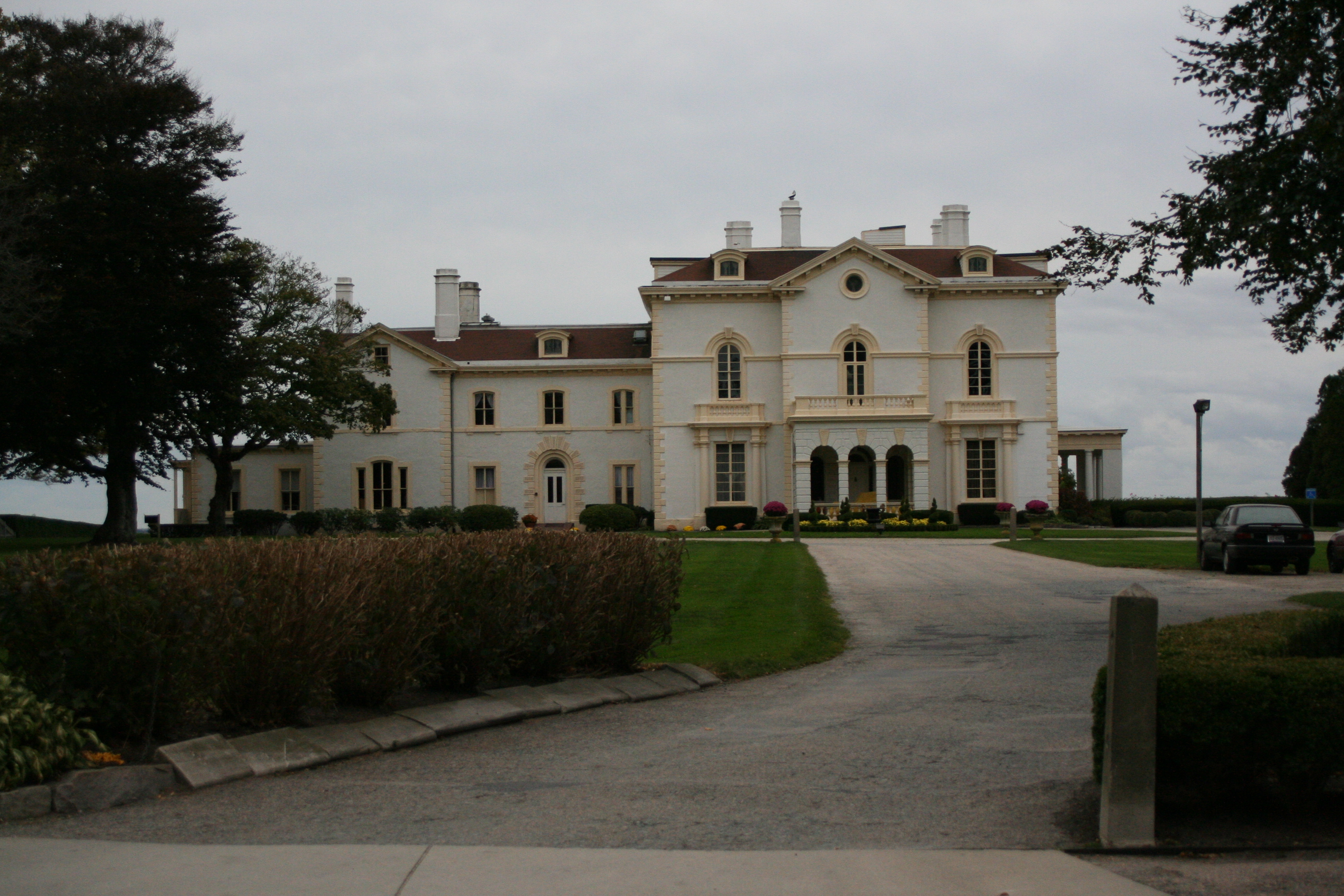
Beechwood, the Astors' summer home in Newport, Rhode Island

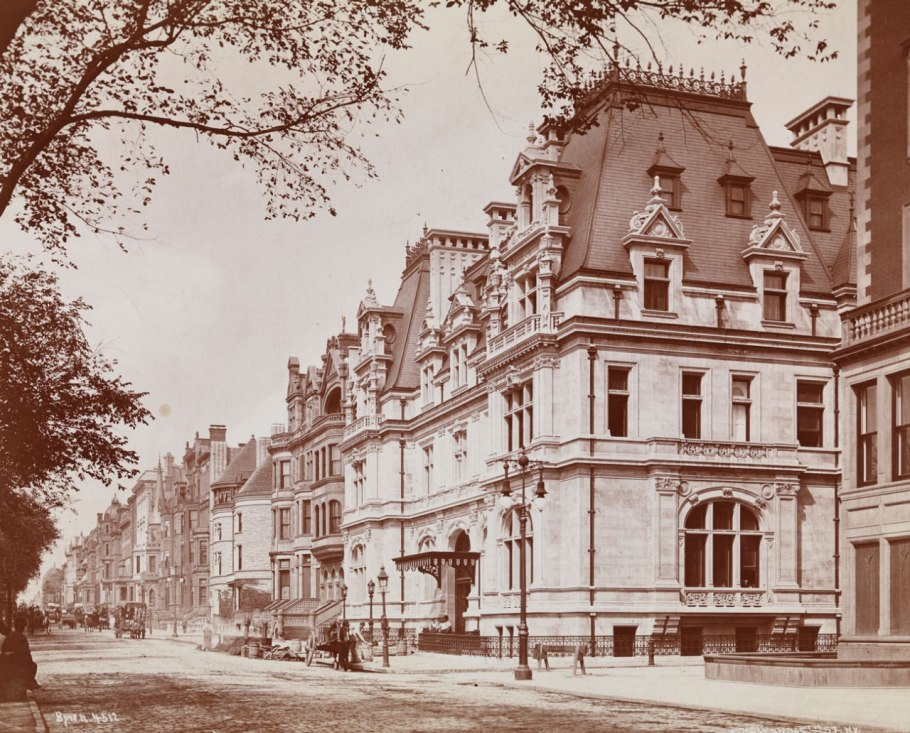
841 Fifth Ave. in Manhattan in 1895

On September 23, 1853, she married William Backhouse Astor Jr. (1829–1892) at Trinity Church. Her husband was the middle son of real estate businessman William Backhouse Astor Sr. of the Astor family and Margaret Alida Rebecca Armstrong. His paternal grandfather was John Jacob Astor and his maternal grandparents were Senator John Armstrong Jr. and Alida (née Livingston) Armstrong, daughter of Robert Livingston of the Livingston family.

Her husband's family had made a fortune initially through the fur trade, then opium trade, and later through investing in New York City real estate. Despite the wealth of the Astor family, Lina had the superior pedigree as a member of an old Knickerbocker (original 1600s Dutch settlers of Manhattan) family.

Together, they had five children:

- Emily Astor (1854–1881), who married James John Van Alen (1848–1923), a sportsman/politician, and had three children.
- Helen Schermerhorn Astor (1855–1893), who married James Roosevelt "Rosy" Roosevelt (1854–1927), a diplomat and the elder half-brother of future President Franklin Delano Roosevelt, and had two children.
- Charlotte Augusta Astor (1858–1920), who married James Coleman Drayton and had four children. She later married George Ogilvy Haig.
- Caroline Schermerhorn "Carrie" Astor (1861–1948), who married Marshall Orme Wilson, the brother of banker Richard Thornton Wilson, Jr. and socialite Grace Graham Wilson, in 1884 and had two sons.
- John Jacob "Jack" Astor IV (1864–1912), who married Ava Lowle Willing (1868–1958), a socialite, and had two children, later married socialite Madeleine Talmage Force (1893–1940), sister of real estate businesswoman/socialite Katherine Emmons Force, and had one son, John Jacob Astor VI, born after John Jacob Astor IV died in the Titanic sinking.

== Socialite ==
Although popularly imagined as wholly preoccupied with "high society", for the first several decades of her married life, Lina Astor was principally occupied with raising her five children and running her household, as was typical of women of her class in mid-19th-century New York City. Due to an inheritance from her parents, Lina had her own money, thus she was far less dependent on her husband than most American women of the time.

In 1862, she and her husband built a four-bay townhouse in the newly fashionable brownstone style at 350 Fifth Avenue, the present site of the Empire State Building. The home was next door to her husband's elder brother, John Jacob Astor III; the two families were next-door neighbors for 28 years, although the Astor brothers' wives did not get along. The Astors also maintained a grand "summer cottage" in Newport, Rhode Island, called Beechwood, which had a ballroom large enough to fit "The 400" – the most fashionable New York socialites of the day. It also neighbored his brother's family, who lived at Beaulieu.

Lina Astor was also a devout Episcopalian who maintained strong ties to New York’s Trinity Church. She and William Astor were married there in 1853 and remained active parishioners throughout their lives.

=== The Gatekeeper ===
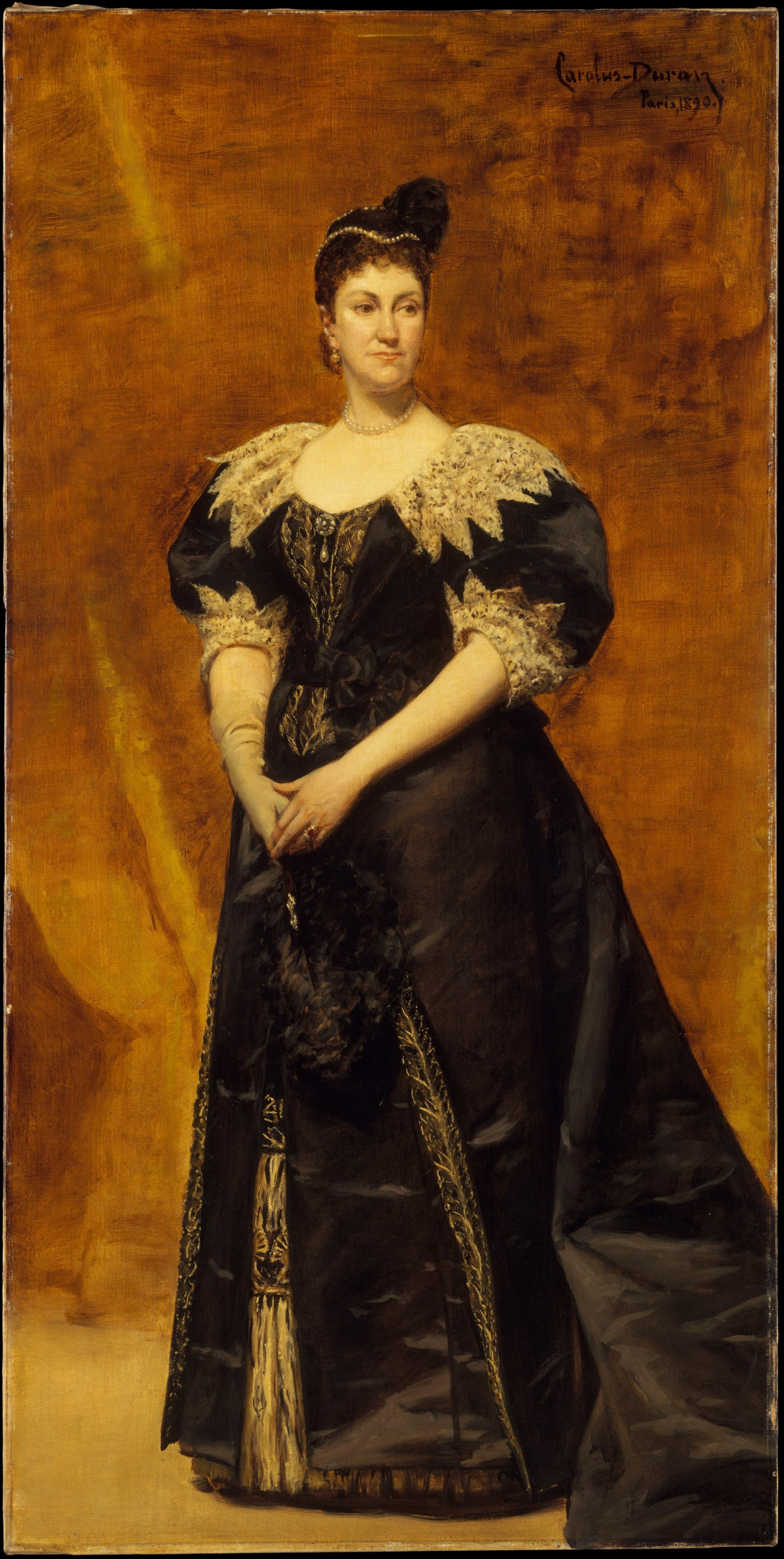
Portrait of Mrs. William Astor by Carolus-Duran, 1890, painted in Paris and now held by the Metropolitan Museum of Art. This painting was placed prominently in Mrs. Astor's house; she would stand in front of it when receiving guests for receptions.

In the decades following the Civil War, the population of New York City grew almost exponentially, and immigrants and wealthy arrivistes from the Midwest began challenging the dominance of the old New York Establishment. Aided by the social arbiter Ward McAllister, whose first cousin, Samuel Cutler Ward, had married into the Astor family, Lina attempted to codify proper behavior and etiquette, as well as determine who was acceptable among the arrivistes for an increasingly heterogeneous city. They were the champions of old money and tradition.

McAllister, who referred to Astor as the "Mystic Rose", stated that amongst the vastly rich families of Gilded Age New York, there were only 400 people who could be counted as members of Fashionable Society - a number he arrived at based on the capacity of Mrs. Astor's New York City ballroom. Her husband's lack of interest in the social whirl did not inhibit but, rather, fueled her burgeoning social activities, which increased in intensity as her children grew older.

Lina was the foremost authority on the "Aristocracy" of New York in the late nineteenth century. She held ornate and elaborate parties for herself and other members of the elite New York socialite crowd. No one was permitted to attend these gatherings without an official calling card from her. Lina's social groups were dominated by strong-willed "aristocratic" women. These social gatherings were dependent on overly conspicuous luxury and publicity. More so than the gatherings themselves, importance was highly placed upon the group as the upper-crust of New York's elite. She and her ladies therefore represented the "Aristocratic," or the Old Money, whereas the newly wealthy Vanderbilt family would establish a new wave of New Money.

=== Relationship with the Vanderbilts ===
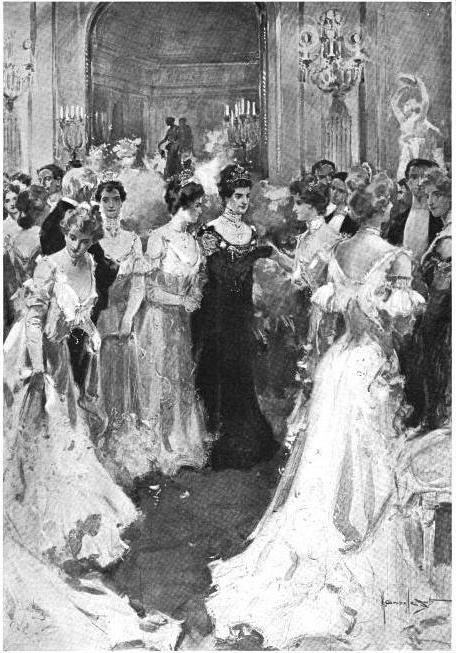
Caroline Schermerhorn Astor and her guests at a New York City ball in 1902

The Vanderbilts, as members of socialite New York through the copious amounts of money that the family had earned rather than inherited, represented a type of wealth that was abhorrent to Astor and her group. Lina Astor found railroad money distasteful. For this reason, she was reluctant to call upon the Vanderbilt girls. In 1883, however, Astor was forced to formally acknowledge the wealthy socialite Alva Erskine Smith, first wife of horse breeder/railroad manager William Kissam Vanderbilt, thereby providing the Vanderbilts, the greatest "new" fortune in New York, entrance into the highest rungs of society.

An oft-repeated New York legend has it that Alva Vanderbilt had planned an elaborate costume ball for her housewarming, with entertainments given by young society figures, but at the last minute notified young Caroline Astor (Lina's youngest daughter) that she could not participate, because Astor had never formally called on Vanderbilt. Also likely, Astor had noted the rising social profile of the Vanderbilt family, led by Alva and Willie and, viewing them as useful allies in her efforts to keep New York society exclusive, had called formally on the Vanderbilts prior to Alva's lavish ball which Astor herself attended. The Vanderbilts were subsequently invited to Astor's annual ball, a formal acknowledgement of their full acceptance into the upper echelon of New York society.

=== Use of "Mrs. Astor" ===
Until 1887, Lina Astor had been formally known as "Mrs. William Astor", but with John Jacob Astor III's wife Charlotte Augusta Gibbes's death that year, she shortened her formal title to "Mrs. Astor", as she was then the senior Mrs. Astor, the only remaining one in her generation. Charlotte's son, William Waldorf Astor, felt that his own wife, Mary "Mamie" Dahlgren Paul, should be "the Mrs. Astor." With the death of John Jacob Astor III in 1890, William Waldorf Astor had inherited his father's share of the Astor holdings and, titularly, became the head of the Astor family. In his mind, this made Mamie "the Mrs. Astor." However, Mamie was eighteen years younger than Lina and lacked Lina's social power. His further attempts at challenging Lina's preeminence in New York society, however, were thwarted, and he soon moved with his family to England, where he later became a viscount.

=== Waldorf-Astoria Hotel ===
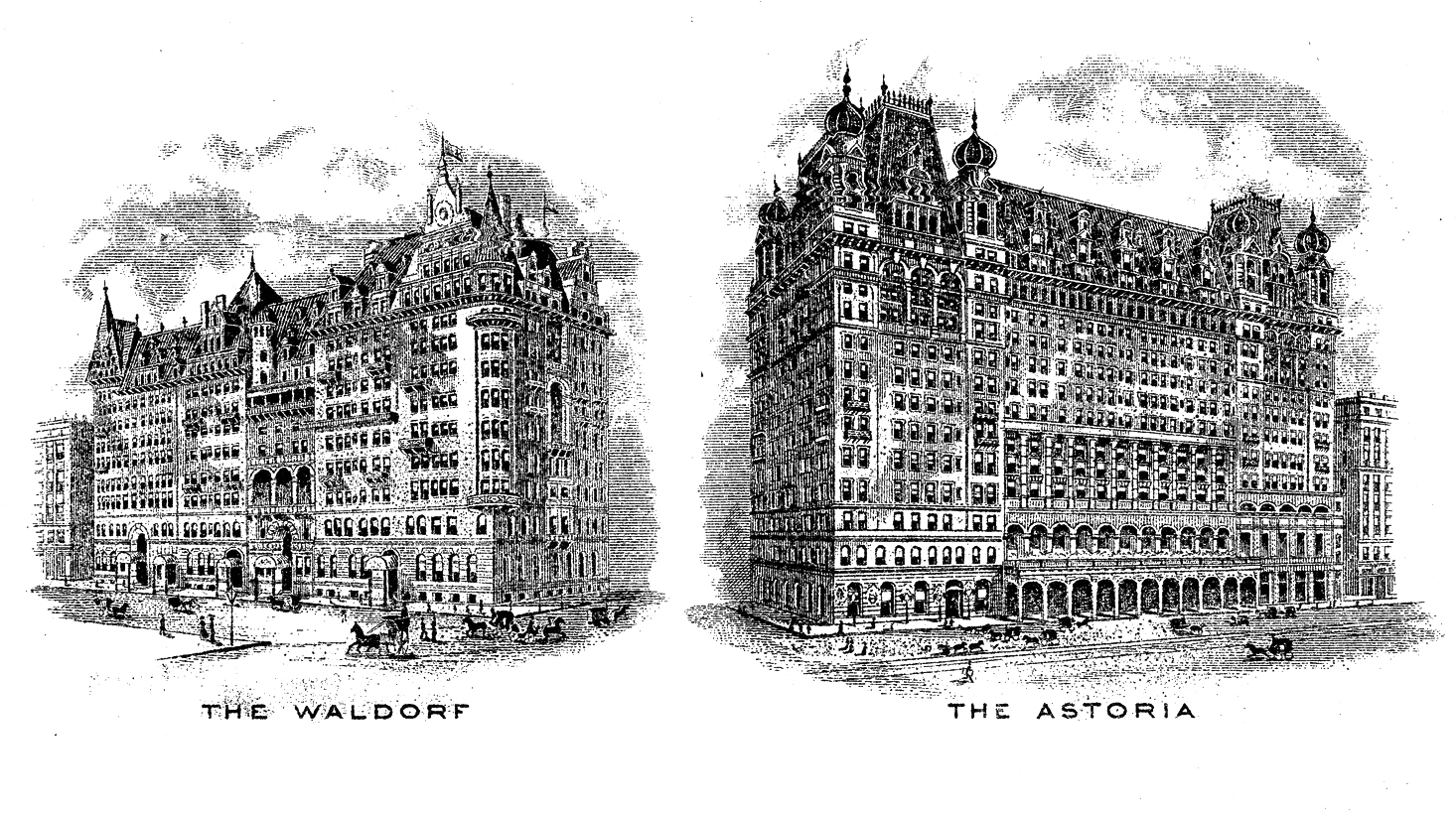
Engraved vignettes of the original hotels, c. 1915

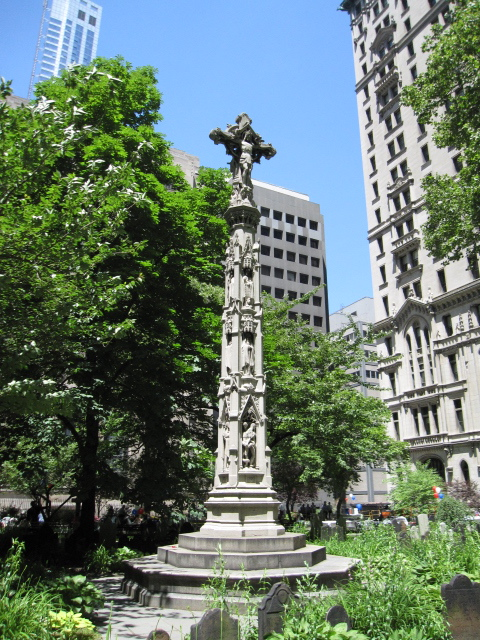
Astor arranged for a cenotaph at Trinity Church cemetery

In retaliation for his aunt's intransigence, William Waldorf Astor had his father's house torn down and replaced by the first Waldorf Hotel. The hotel was specifically designed to overshadow Mrs. Astor's mansion, which was right next door, in an attempt to overshadow her status with it. The Waldorf Hotel was thirteen stories tall and was built in the form of a German Renaissance chateau: it thus not only overshadowed Lina, but all other structures in the neighborhood as well. Mrs. Astor famously stated about the hotel, "There's a glorified tavern next door."

Until the opulence of the Waldorf Hotel revolutionized how New York socialized publicly, polite society did not gather in public places, especially hotels. Unwilling to live next door to New York's latest sensation and public draw, Mrs. Astor and her son, Jack, first contemplated tearing down her house and replacing it with livery stables. Eventually she and Jack tore down their house and erected another hotel at its site, the Astoria, and soon the two hotels merged and became the original Waldorf-Astoria Hotel. Astor consequently built a double mansion, one of the largest ever built in New York, for her and her son, with Mrs. Astor occupying the northern residence, 841 Fifth Avenue and her son occupying the southern half, 840 Fifth Avenue.

The Astors' Fifth Avenue home and the original Waldorf-Astoria Hotel were both eventually torn down in 1927 and 1928 to make way for Temple Emanu-El and the Empire State Building, respectively.

== Death ==
By the time she moved into her new house facing Central Park, at the corner of 65th Street, Mrs. Astor's husband had died, and she lived with her son and his family. Spending her last several years suffering from periodic dementia, she died at age 78 on October 30, 1908, and was interred in the Trinity Church Cemetery in upper Manhattan. In 1914, her youngest daughter Carrie commissioned the prominent Astor Cross in the churchyard as a memorial.

Following Mrs. Astor's death, it reportedly took three women to fill her role in New York Society: Marion Graves Anthon Fish, the wife of Stuyvesant Fish, Theresa Fair Oelrichs, the wife of Hermann Oelrichs, and Alva Belmont, by then the wife of Oliver Belmont.

Mrs. Astor has been portrayed by Donna Murphy in the HBO drama The Gilded Age.
