= Wiggins (surname) =

Wiggins is a surname. Notable people with the surname include:

- Aaron Wiggins (born 1999), American basketball player
- Alan Wiggins (1958–1991), American baseball player
- Alan Wiggins Jr. (born 1985), American basketball player
- Alphea Wiggins, Barbadian politician
- Andrew Wiggins (born 1995), Canadian basketball player, son of Mitchell Wiggins
- Bayley Wiggins (born 1994), New Zealand cricketer
- Bernice Love Wiggins (1897–1936), Texas poet
- Bradley Wiggins (born 1980), British cyclist, son of Gary Wiggins
- Brice Wiggins, American attorney and politician.
- Candice Wiggins (born 1987), American basketball player, daughter of Alan Wiggins
- Carson Wiggins (born 2005), American baseball player
- Charles E. Wiggins (1927–2000), U.S. Representative from California, and later a United States federal judge
- Chris Wiggins, Canadian actor
- David Wiggins, British philosopher
- David Wiggins (judge) (born 1951), American jurist
- D'Wayne Wiggins (1961–2025), American singer, guitarist, and record producer
- Ezekiel Stone Wiggins, Canadian author, Ottawa Prophet
- Gary Wiggins, Australian cyclist
- Gerald Wiggins, American jazz pianist and organist
- Graham Wiggins, American musician
- Guy C. Wiggins (1883–1962), American painter
- Ira Loren Wiggins (1899–1987), American botanist
- James "Boodle It" Wiggins, American blues singer and musician
- James Wiggins (disambiguation), multiple people
- Jaxon Wiggins (born 2001), American baseball player
- Jermaine Wiggins, American football player
- Joe Wiggins, (1909–1982), English professional football player
- John & Audrey Wiggins, American Country music duo
- Joseph Wiggins (1832–1905), English mariner
- Keith Wiggins, British motor racing team owner
- Kim Douglas Wiggins, American sculptor
- Laura Slade Wiggins, American television and film actress and musician
- Marianne Wiggins, American novelist and former wife of Salman Rushdie
- Mary Wiggins (1904-1974), American composer, educator and organist
- Mike Wiggins, American businessman and politician
- Mitchell Wiggins (1959–2024), American basketball player
- Randy Wiggins, American politician
- Stephen Wiggins, American applied mathematician
- Thomas "Blind Tom" Wiggins (1849–1908), American pianist
- Wiley Wiggins, American actor

== See also ==
- Justice Wiggins (disambiguation)
- Senator Wiggins (disambiguation)
- Wiggin
