= Metropolitan Club (New York City) =

Social club in New York City

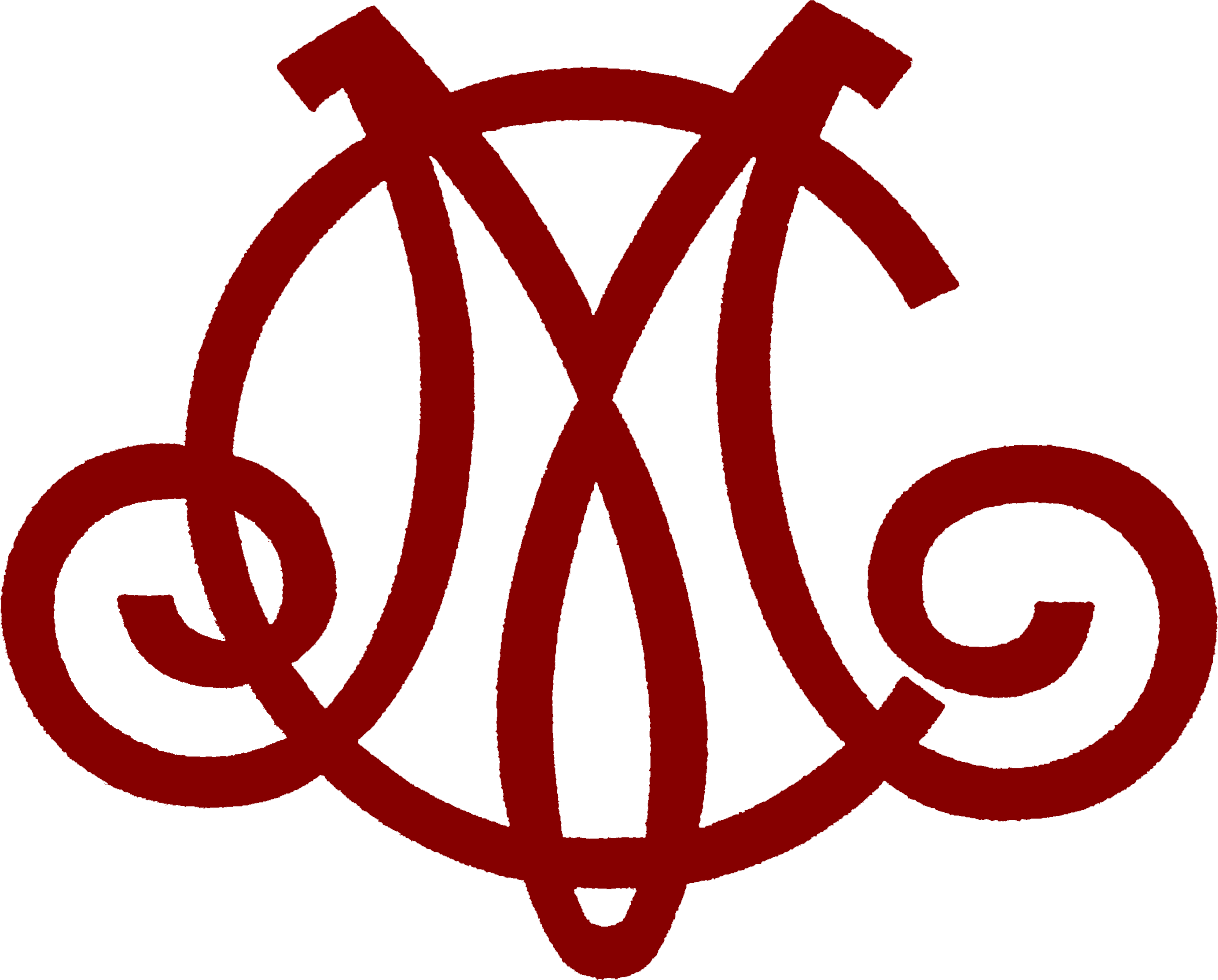

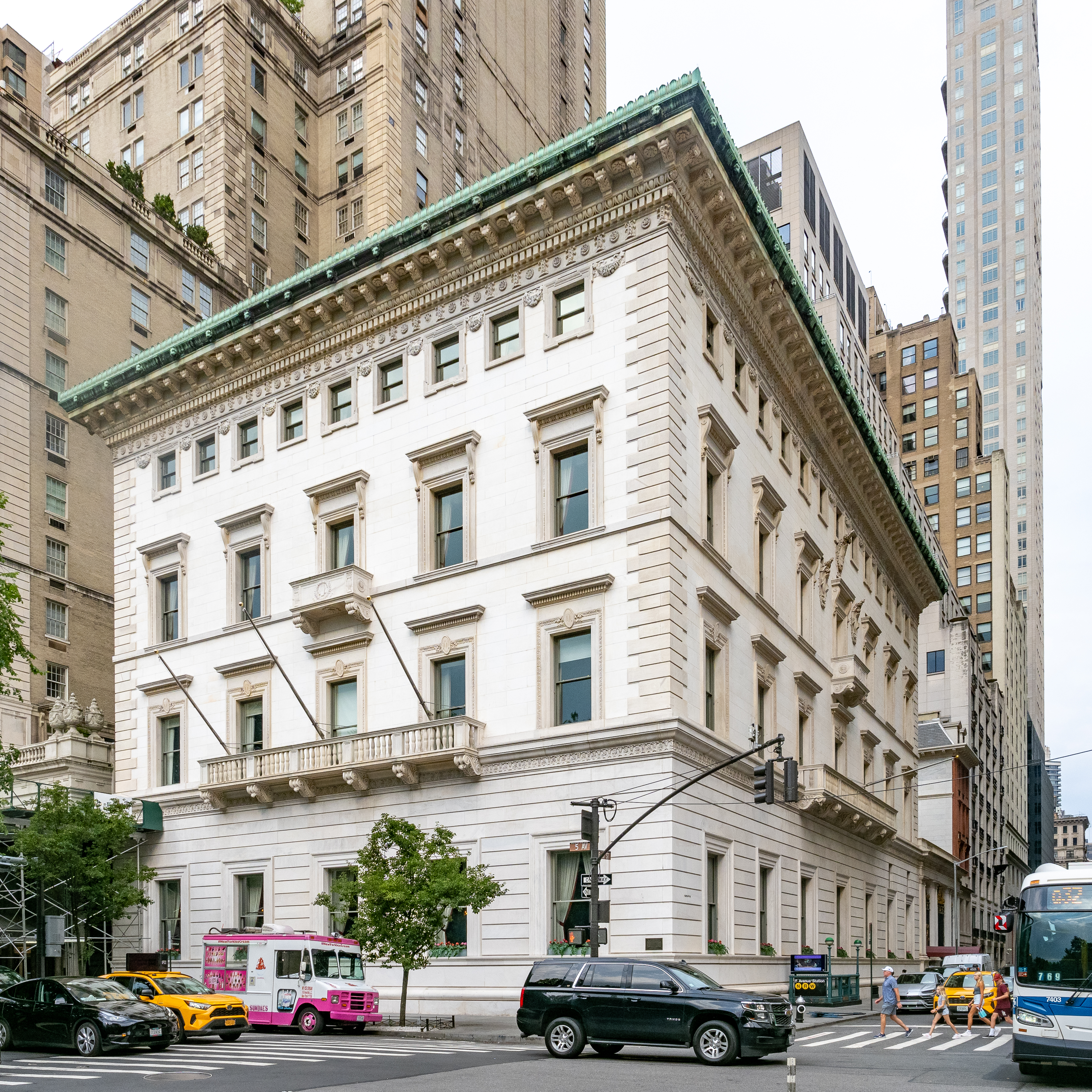
- The clubhouse's Fifth Avenue facade
- Formation: 1891; 135 years ago
- Type: Private social club
- Location(s): 1 East 60th Street Manhattan, New York, U.S.
- Website: metropolitanclubnyc.org
- 40°45′54″N 73°58′20″W

History
- Built: 1891–1894

Site notes
- Architect(s): McKim, Mead & White (original building), Ogden Codman Jr. (expansion)
- Architectural style: Italian Renaissance Revival style

New York City Landmark
- Designated: September 11, 1979
- Reference no.: 1020

The Metropolitan Club is a private social club on the Upper East Side of Manhattan in New York City, New York. It was founded as a gentlemen's club in March 1891 by a group of wealthy New Yorkers led by the financier John Pierpont Morgan. The clubhouse at Fifth Avenue and 60th Street was designed by McKim, Mead & White and is a New York City designated landmark. The club is controlled by a 25-member board of governors. Initially, only men could become members, though women were given membership privileges in the mid-20th century. Like other Gilded Age social clubs, the Metropolitan Club functioned largely as a meeting place for the wealthy, hosting events such as luncheons, dinners, debutante balls, and business meetings. Over the years, the club's membership has included bankers, industrialists, doctors, lawyers, and CEOs, including several members each from the Goelet, Roosevelt, Vanderbilt, and Whitney families.

Morgan and 24 other wealthy men founded the club after two prominent men were denied membership at the Union Club of the City of New York. Work on the clubhouse began that May, and the club had attracted 1,000 members when the building was completed in February 1894. In its first few decades, the club hosted a variety of high-society events but also experienced financial shortfalls. The club acquired a neighboring house in 1912, and its membership increased to a high of 1,436 by the late 1920s. With the onset of the Great Depression and World War II, half the members had left by 1945, when the club narrowly avoided bankruptcy. The Metropolitan modernized its clubhouse over the next decades. To raise money, the club contemplated erecting a tower in the 1970s and again in the 1980s, but both proposals were unsuccessful. A penthouse with a dining room was completed in 2007.

The clubhouse consists of three structures surrounding a courtyard. Stanford White of McKim, Mead & White designed the main clubhouse and a northern annex in the Italian Renaissance Revival style, while the easternmost structure was designed by Ogden Codman Jr. The original structures have a marble facade with relatively little ornamentation. By contrast, the clubhouse's interiors were designed as ornate spaces with various murals and carvings. The first story includes the Great Hall and lounges, while club rooms, dining rooms, and bedrooms were on the upper stories.

== History ==
In the late 19th century, New York City contained many private social clubs, which were largely based on British social clubs. At the end of the 19th century, many upscale residences were being developed along Fifth Avenue, particularly north of 59th Street. Many of the city's wealthiest residents thus began moving uptown along Fifth Avenue.

One of the city's most prominent clubs in the late 19th century was the Union Club of the City of New York, founded in 1836. The Union Club was restricted to 1,000 members, resulting in a long waiting list and several offshoot clubs. Each prospective member's application had to be sponsored by an existing member and reviewed by the Union Club's board of governors. By the 1870s, the board of governors frequently blackballed, or rejected, several prominent figures' membership applications on spurious grounds. Local newspapers published the names of blackballed applicants, resulting in humiliation for both the applicant and their sponsor. The Union Club blackballed two high-profile applicants in 1890: Erie Railroad president John King, who was sponsored by J. P. Morgan, and physician William Seward Webb, who was sponsored by William K. Vanderbilt.

=== 1890s ===
==== Establishment ====
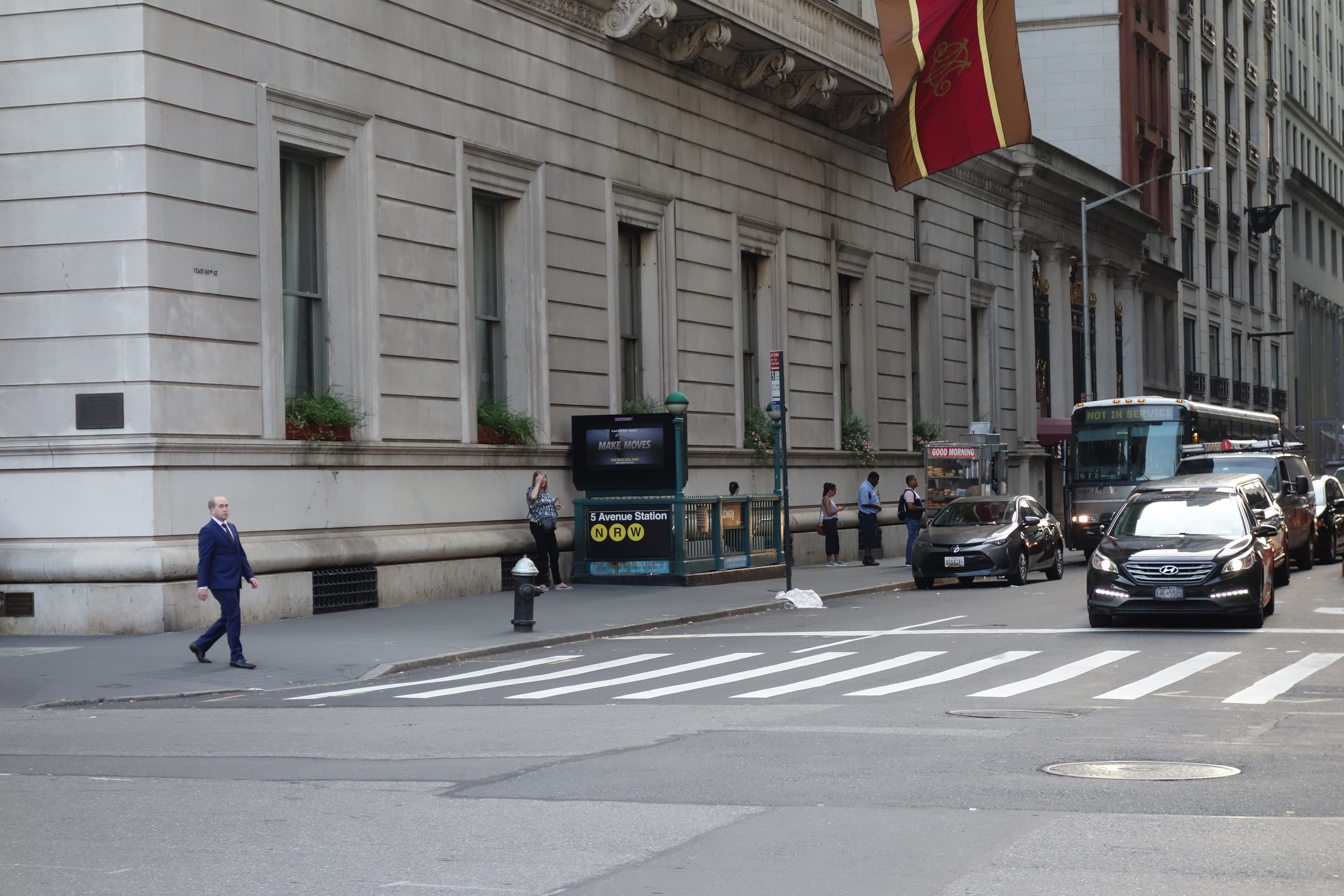
The clubhouse's lower stories

Morgan decided to form the Metropolitan Club after the Union Club failed to accept King and Webb. He was soon joined by other displeased members of the Union Club, including members of the Goelet, Iselin, Roosevelt, and Vanderbilt families. Morgan's friend William Watts Sherman drafted a constitution for a new club and invited 25 Gilded Age moguls to serve as co-founders. Sherman and many of the invitees attended a dinner at the Knickerbocker Club on February 20, 1891, to discuss the formation of Morgan's club. The founders next had to decide on a name, and they considered names such as "Millionaires' Club", "Park Club", and "the Spectators". The Metropolitan Club was formed on March 7, 1891. J. P. Morgan was elected as the club's first president, and the founders planned to invite 1,200 resident members (who lived in the New York City area) and 500 non-resident members (who lived further out). Annual dues were set at $100 for resident members and $50 for non-resident members, in addition to a flat initiation fee of $300.

When the new Metropolitan was founded, there was another Metropolitan Club two blocks south at Fifth Avenue and 58th Street, which exclusively served the city's Jewish community. Sherman claimed that the new Metropolitan's organizers did not know about the older club on 58th Street. Ultimately, the older club gave up its name, though the reason for this is unclear. The new Metropolitan Club was originally nicknamed the Millionaires' Club, as most of its earliest members were millionaires. The new club's members opened a temporary office at the Madison Square Bank Building, at the intersection of Fifth Avenue, 23rd Street, and Broadway. They sent out invitations to 1,000 wealthy New Yorkers, nearly half of whom had responded by April. Membership lagged after the club had signed on 650 members. There were fears that the club would not be profitable because of its location, which at the time was still far removed from Manhattan's commercial center.

The founders wished to build a clubhouse near Central Park, which would both serve the uptown crowd and be larger than the Union Club's existing building. The club began planning a clubhouse on a site at Fifth Avenue and 60th Street. The Hamersley family had owned the site since 1853, and the land was vacant by the 1890s. Three of the Metropolitan's members—Robert Goelet, Adrian Iselin Jr., and Samuel D. Babcock—obtained an option to buy seven of Hamersley's land lots. The site was next to the under-construction Elbridge T. Gerry Mansion on 61st Street and several other clubs including the New York Athletic Club, Liederkranz, Arion Society, and Seventh Regiment Veteran's Club were nearby. The board of governors settled on a parcel measuring 100 by 200 feet (30 by 61 m) after initially contemplating a smaller site. The Metropolitan obtained the site at 60th Street in May 1891 paying $480,000. (Note: Some sources cite the purchase price as $420,000.) The club offered $100,000 in cash and taking a mortgage loan of $380,000 from the Hamersley estate's trustees. Each of the club's 25 founders pledged $5,000, and they also planned to charge 1,200 members a $300 initiation fee, to pay for the site.

==== Construction ====
The club selected the architectural firm of McKim, Mead & White to design its clubhouse, and the architects, Charles McKim and Stanford White, became charter members of the club. Excavations commenced that May, and John D. Crimmins began digging up the site. McKim, Mead & White spent the next several months drawing up plans for the clubhouse, adjusting the plans to fit the club's demands. By that September, the club had 700 members, although it had not yet decided on a design for the building. Goelet submitted preliminary plans for the clubhouse to the city's building department the same month. Although there was a tentative agreement on the interior design, the board of governors and the architects continued to discuss the facade's design, including the location of the main entrance. After several alterations to the plans, the club approved a final design in February 1892. The structure was intended to be much larger than other clubs' quarters, including those of the Knickerbocker, Union, and Manhattan clubs. The Real Estate Record predicted that the structure "will undoubtedly be a noteworthy addition to the club houses of the city", while The New York Times predicted that the clubhouse would "place the Metropolitan at the very head of the club procession".

McKim, Mead & White hired David H. King Jr. as the general contractor, and Morgan was heavily involved with many aspects of the design, including such minute details as the carpets. Work was delayed in mid-1892 when laborers went on strike. The new clubhouse was almost complete by early 1893. By then, the influx of new members had slowed dramatically, and existing members' annual dues could not adequately fund the club's operations. The club's members took out two mortgage loans from the Bowery Savings Bank that year for a combined $1.6 million. The Union Club contemplated merging with the Metropolitan in mid-1893, but the Union's members ultimately voted against a merger. Additional labor strikes delayed the building's construction further, and the final architectural details were not added until February 1894. The clubhouse ultimately cost $1 million, excluding furnishings and decorations. Including these additional costs, the club spent a total of $1,777,480 on its clubhouse.

==== Opening and early years ====
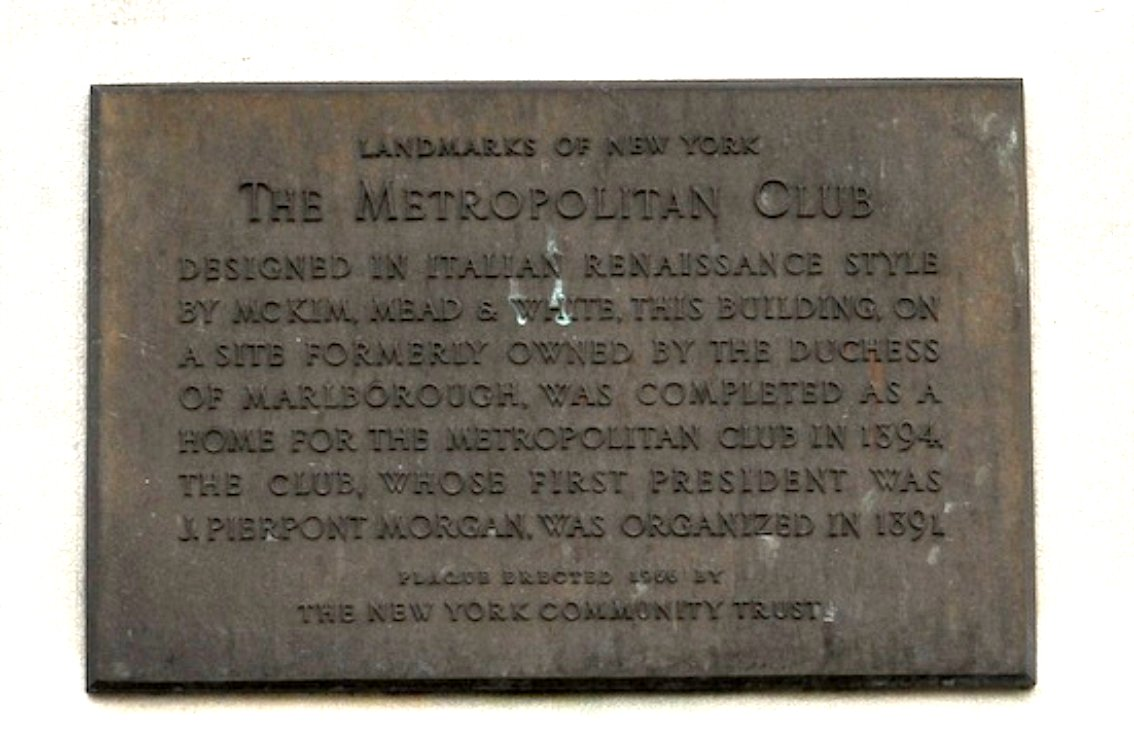
Historical plaque outside the club

The Metropolitan initially planned to raise money through initiation fees and by renting out the bedrooms in the clubhouse's attic. By early February 1894, the club had 1,000 members; contrary to the club's common nickname, Millionaires' Club, not all of the members were millionaires. The first official event at the clubhouse took place February 20, 1894, when the board of governors ate dinner in the strangers' dining room. The Metropolitan hosted a public preview of the clubhouse at the end of February 1894, and the clubhouse officially opened two days later on March 1. Several thousand people attended its first reception. The club's finance and building committee disbanded in April 1894 with a surplus of $122,519.

Two months after the clubhouse had opened, the New York Evening World wrote that many of the club's existing members shunned the clubhouse; for example, the dining room rarely had more than eight people, even though it could seat a thousand. The club's executive committee had hired several staff members by the end of 1894, including a chef from France. The Metropolitan also arranged hansom cab service, telephone service, and newspaper subscriptions for its members. The little-used bowling alley and one of the wine rooms were converted into bicycle storage rooms. The club had 1,030 members by the following year, including influential industrialists, politicians, and financiers, as well as members of well-off families. Members often hosted lavish dinners at the clubhouse, and events were often hosted in the northern wing.

Despite the club's large membership, it recorded a net deficit in 1895 and 1896. The club's board of governors initially did not want to impose an additional fee on its members. The Calumet Club unsuccessfully proposed merging with the Metropolitan Club, and there was also a failed proposal to merge with the Union Club. During 1897 and 1898, the club did record a net profit but only because of contributions from the governors. The Metropolitan recorded increasing profits from the bar and restaurant by 1898, and it also relaxed its rules for non-members. The next year, the board of governors contemplated charging each member $50 to cover the increasing deficits. Existing members were not visiting the clubhouse frequently because they were attending events elsewhere.

=== 1900s and 1910s ===
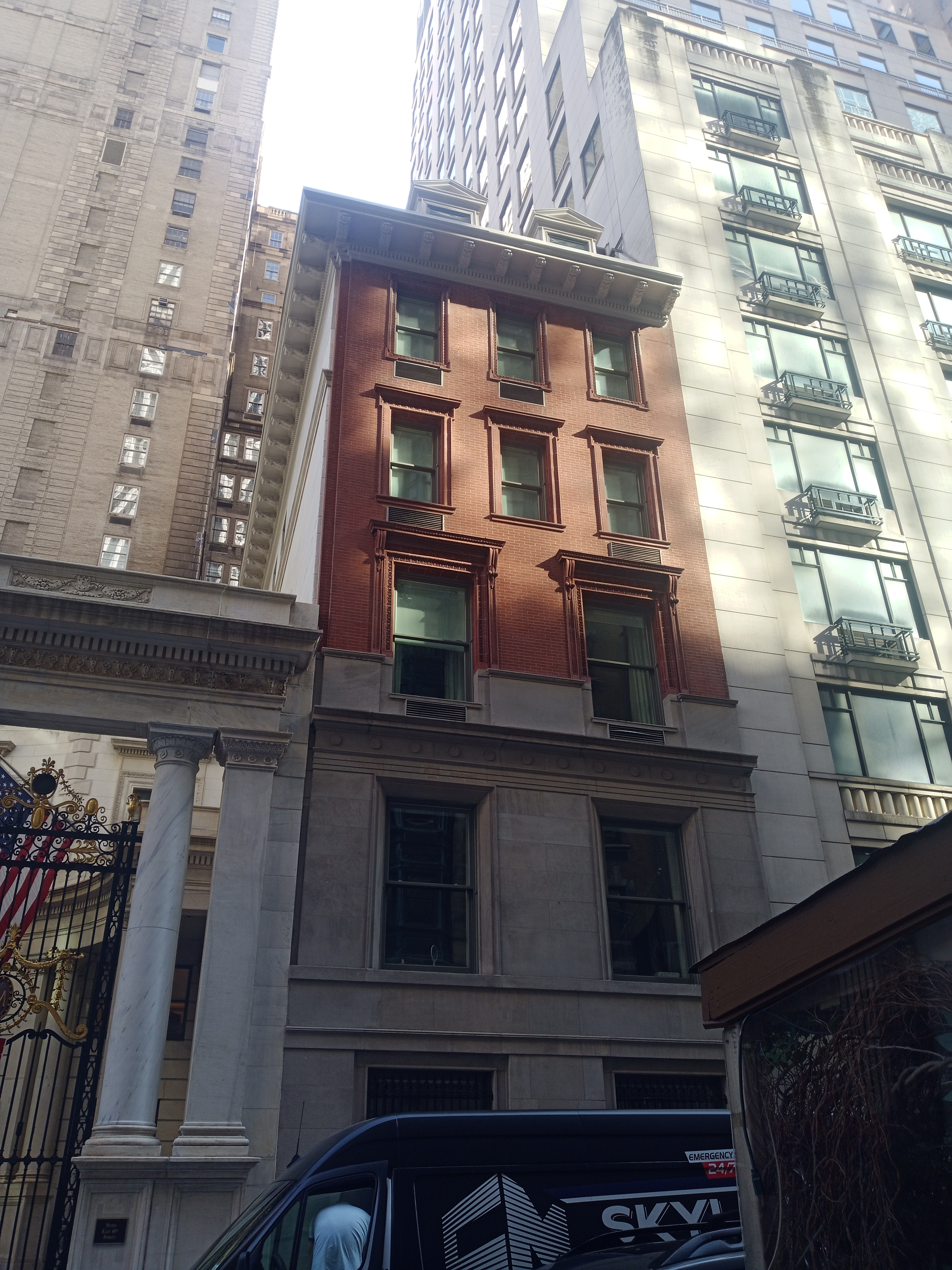
The house at 11 East 60th Street, redesigned in 1912 as an annex to the original clubhouse

The club was still operating at a deficit in 1900, prompting the governors to increase the annual dues. At the time, the club had 1,062 members as well as 22 people on its waiting list. Morgan resigned as the club's first president that February and was replaced by Levi P. Morton, although Morgan remained a member of the club. After the Metropolitan Club allowed Union Club members to begin drinking at its bar in 1902, daily revenue from the bar increased tenfold, from $12.50 to $135. The club had 1,200 to 1,300 members by the middle of the decade, of which about 1,000 were resident members. Its roof garden was also popular during the summertime. John McGowan, who owned the neighboring building at 11 East 60th Street, offered to sell the building to the club in 1905, but he withdrew his offer after the Metropolitan presented a counter-offer that was 30% less. The club continued to lose money, and the board of governors levied additional fees on existing members to cover the shortfall. The board of governors ultimately voted in early 1907 to increase the annual dues. The next year, the board of governors voted to commission portraits of each president in the clubhouse.

The club's only surviving original trustee, Charles Lanier, agreed in 1909 to transfer ownership of the clubhouse to a new board of trustees. Morton remained the club's president until November 1911, when Frank K. Sturgis took over as the Metropolitan's third president. The Metropolitan bought the house at 11 East 60th Street from McGowan the same month. J.P. Morgan & Co. provided $165,000 to finance the club's acquisition of 11 East 60th Street, and the club hired Ogden Codman Jr. to renovate that house. Codman expanded the clubhouse into 11 East 60th Street's rear yard, and he removed that building's entrance stoop. In addition, the club borrowed $25,000 at the end of 1912 to pay for additional events at the clubhouse. Simultaneously, the Brooklyn Rapid Transit Company (BRT) was planning to build a New York City Subway station at Fifth Avenue–59th Street, next to the clubhouse. The Metropolitan's members initially opposed a subway entrance next to the clubhouse but ultimately agreed to give the BRT an easement to build the subway entrance. The subway station opened in 1919.

Meanwhile, the onset of World War I barely affected membership numbers. From the beginning of 1914 to the end of 1919, membership declined by just one, to 1,370. The club waived annual fees for members who fought in the war. The Metropolitan's board of governors voted in 1917 to endorse the war effort, and the club simplified its menu the same year, citing wartime shortages. By 1918, there were 125 Metropolitan Club members fighting in World War I. Ultimately, six club members died in the war, and a plaque was installed on the main floor to honor them. The board of governors voted in 1919 to impose a one-time assessment of $50 on existing members and to increase annual dues. The latter increase was postponed after 82 members signed a petition protesting the increases. After Prohibition in the United States began that year, banning the sale of alcoholic beverages in the U.S., the club's executive committee began allowing members to bring their own drinks, charging a service fee for each drink. In addition, the club added lockers for alcoholic beverages.

=== 1920s and 1930s ===
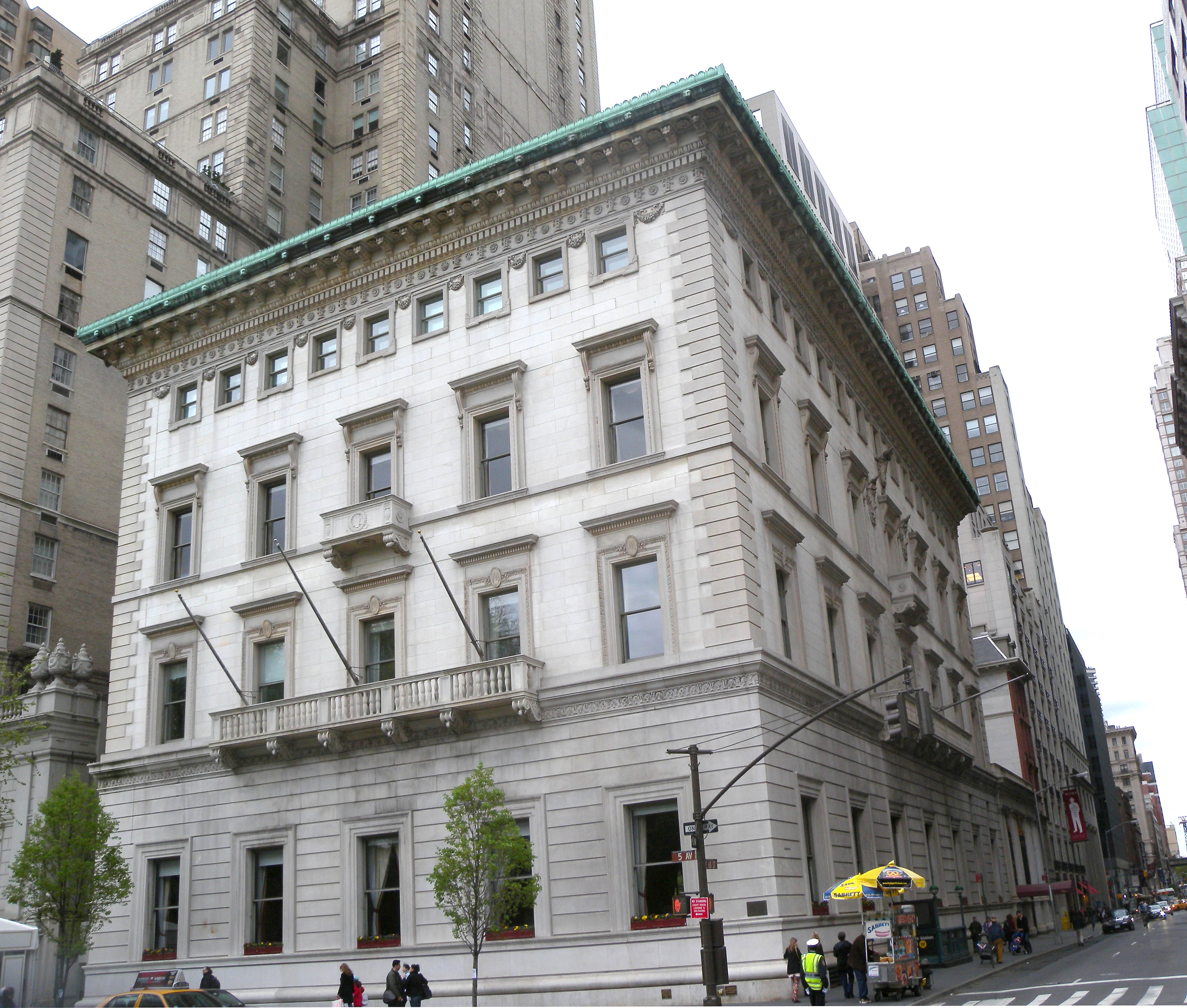
The facade as seen from Grand Army Plaza

The board of governors voted in 1921 to charge each member another $100 to cover the club's budget shortfalls. At the time, the clubhouse was valued at $2.2 million for tax purposes. After a failed attempt to increase membership fees in 1922, the board appointed a committee to discuss proposals for the club's future. One such proposal called for the Metropolitan to merge with the Union Club, though this idea was rejected. Meanwhile, the club's revenue and membership declined, since it was no longer allowed to sell drinks. By the beginning of 1923, the club had 1,199 members, and its restaurant was losing thousands of dollars. After months of deliberation, the committee proposed that the club begin allowing foreign members, add a gymnasium and bedrooms, renovate the squash court, and allow members to smoke in the dining room. The club finally succeeded in raising membership fees in 1923. This allowed the club to earn a small profit in 1924 and repay the clubhouse's mortgage the next year. The Mutual Life Insurance Company of New York also lent the club $1.5 million in 1925.

Sturgis resigned as the Metropolitan's president in 1926, and the club appointed Newbold Morris as its fourth president after a months-long search. The next year, the clubhouse was slightly damaged in a fire. The operators of the neighboring Hotel Pierre offered to buy the clubhouse, but the club's board rejected the offer. Morris died in 1928, two and a half years after he became the club's president, and was succeeded by George Emlen Roosevelt. Even as the surrounding buildings were being demolished and replaced by high-rises, the club's membership reached a maximum of 1,436 in 1929. However, the onset of the Great Depression that year prompted large numbers of members to resign, as many members had lost their wealth in the Wall Street Crash of 1929. The club's board voted in 1933 to borrow $200,000; by then, the club was recording a $50,000 annual deficit, and real-estate taxes had tripled compared to before World War I. With the repeal of Prohibition that year, the club applied to the New York state government for a liquor license. The southern ground-level lounge was converted into a bar, and the club also began allowing women to eat dinner in the main clubhouse.

Roosevelt resigned in January 1934, and Ambrose D. Henry became the club's sixth president, although he served in this role for less than a year. At the time, the club had 934 members. That February, the club's financial difficulties prompted the board of governors to consider merging with "some club of similar standing", although the rest of the members rejected the plan. The club's board also contemplated issuing bonds or levying an assessment on members, and it ultimately asked each member to contribute $50. Later the same year, the board suspended initiation fees until it could attract at least 250 more members. William A. Barber became the Metropolitan's seventh president in 1935, and membership had increased to 1,120 within a year. The club offered memberships to widows, and it admitted dozens of members of the defunct Calumet Club.

=== 1940s and 1950s ===
The club celebrated its 50th anniversary in 1941 with a dinner at the Everglades Club in Florida. At the time, the club had five surviving charter members, who had joined when the club was formed. By the next year, membership had reached a nadir of 710, about half of the level recorded in 1929. Amid the onset of World War II, the club recorded a $265,000 loss between 1942 and 1944. Parts of the clubhouse were converted to bedrooms for soldiers, and the club waived membership fees for members who fought in the war. The club also began allowing women into its great hall and the third-floor dining room in 1944, and the women's dining rooms in the north annex were closed. Guernsey Curran took over as the club's eighth president that March, and the club owed over $58,000 in unpaid real-estate taxes by the end of the year. In addition, the club's mortgage loan from Mutual Life was about to mature, but the Metropolitan had not paid interest on the loan in several years.

By late 1944, Mutual Life was threatening to auction off the clubhouse if the club could not pay off the mortgage loan. The board of governors considered several plans to reorganize the club in early 1945, including selling the clubhouse. The members contemplated acquiring Gladys Szechenyi's house at 1 East 67th Street, but they ultimately decided to keep the clubhouse and raise money to pay off debts, renovate the clubhouse, and provide capital for the club. Curran, who had been advocating to sell the clubhouse, resigned as the club's president in March 1945, and several of his allies also resigned their membership. Curran's successor, Lee Warren James, devised a plan to pay off Mutual Life. That May, the Metropolitan announced that it would sell $1.8 million in bonds to pay for upgrades to the clubhouse, thus narrowly avoiding bankruptcy. Due to slower-than-expected bond sales, the club also raised the annual dues the next year.

The club began to modernize its building in the 1940s, replacing its hydraulic elevators, electrical systems, and furniture. The club continued to experience financial issues, and James had to refinance the club's loan in 1947 because of lower-than-expected bond sales. James stepped down as the club's president in 1951, and he was succeeded by George W. Whitaker, the club's 10th president. The Metropolitan began leasing out space to external organizations in 1955, when the Warner-Lambert Pharmaceutical Company leased the ground floor of the north wing. Thomas A. O'Hara became the Metropolitan's 11th president in 1956 following Whitaker's resignation. O'Hara resigned after one year, and James again led the club until 1958, when Cornelius J. Reid became the 13th president.

=== 1960s and 1970s ===
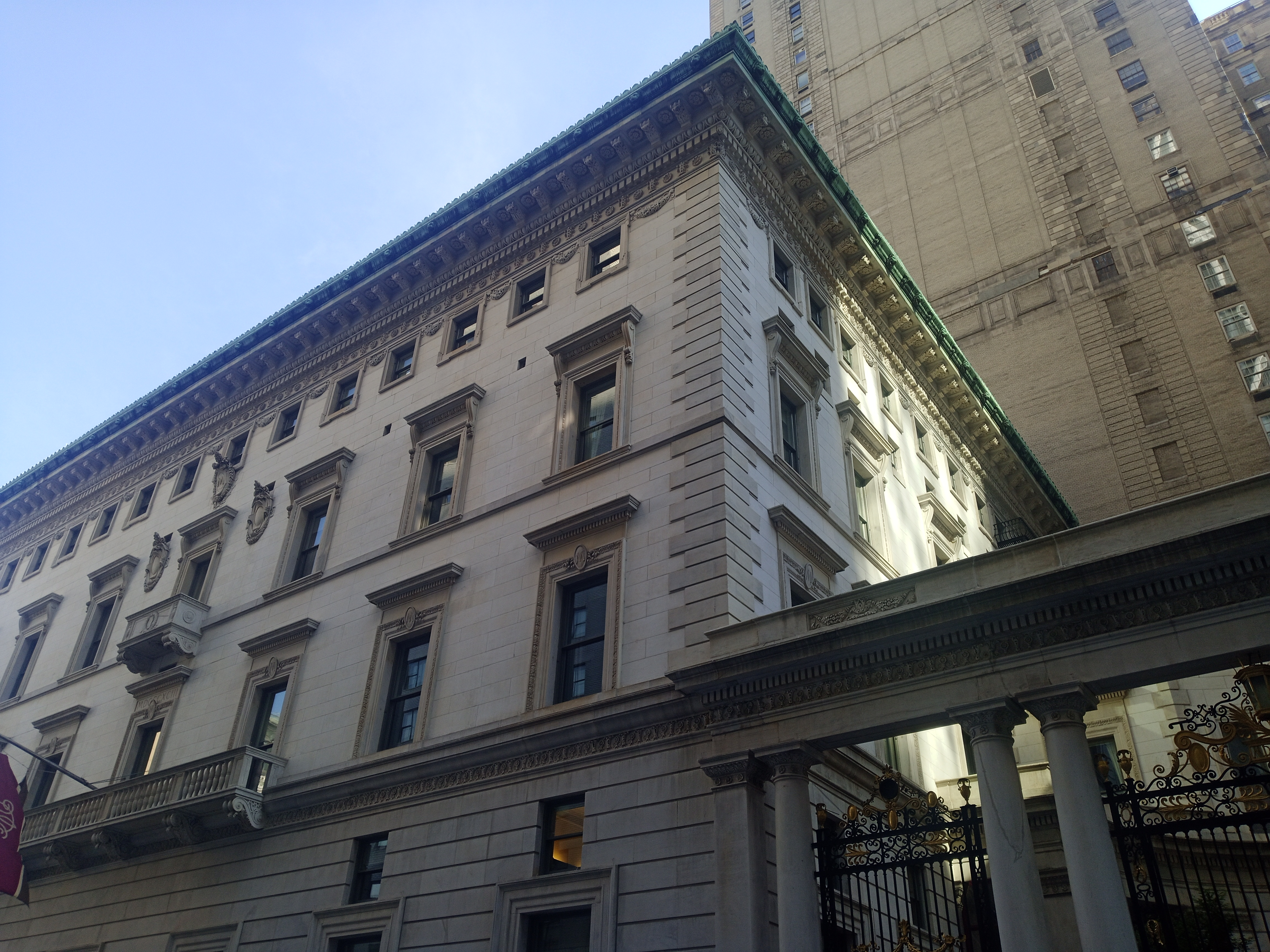
The clubhouse viewed from 60th Street

Richard H. West took over as the club's 14th president in 1960 after Reid resigned. By then, the New York Daily News reported that the Metropolitan's members were on average 65 years old. The city and national governments began charging taxes on the Metropolitan's membership dues in 1961, though the federal tax was repealed four years later. The next year, the club's board voted to retain control over the building, amid proposals to replace the clubhouse with a tower or sell it to the Russian government for use as a consulate. To pay for further improvements to the building, the club began asking its members in 1962 to contribute between $24 and $120 a year. Over the next two decades, the club earned $42,000 to $118,771 per year from these contributions. Individual donors provided funds for various restoration projects, which were usually small in scope and did not involve the entire clubhouse. The Metropolitan discussed the possibility of merging with, or cross-honoring the memberships of, the Lotos, Manhattan, and Houston clubs during the early 1960s; none of these proposals passed.

The club began renovating the clubhouse's facade in September 1965. The next year, the kitchen was moved from the third mezzanine to the third floor for $226,000, and additional bedrooms were built. After West's resignation in 1966, Spruille Braden became the club's 15th president that year. The club added a sauna in 1968, and the Great Hall's marble was cleaned that year. The main bar was renovated in early 1969, with funds from anonymous donors. The library's windows were replaced in 1970, and the club built 44 bedrooms in the third mezzanine the next year. Another donor also contributed $100,000 to pay off the club's debt.

To raise money, the club raised annual dues significantly, from $300 in 1965 to $900 by 1972; this resulted in a steep decline in membership. More than a hundred members resigned between 1970 and 1972 alone, when dues were raised by 60%; as a consequence, income from dues increased 30%. By the mid-1970s, the Metropolitan had only 434 regular members, although this count did not include junior, non-resident, or guest members. Braden stepped down as the president in 1973 and was replaced by Peter Hilton, who died a year later. The Canadian Club of New York became a Metropolitan Club affiliate in 1974 and moved into the Metropolitan's clubhouse, occupying the former ladies' dining rooms. The Metropolitan also established membership classes for members of the Canadian Club and for women. By then, few people visited the clubhouse during the evening; the partnership with the Canadian Club helped the Metropolitan pay off taxes and other expenses.

Alger B. Chapman was appointed as the Metropolitan's 17th president in 1974, serving for three years; he was replaced by Harold B. Hamilton in 1977. The club considered demolishing its courtyard in the 1970s and replacing it with a 30-story hotel designed by Kohn Pedersen Fox; the hotel would use air rights from the existing clubhouse. At the time, it was one of several high-profile sites in New York City that were being considered for redevelopment. Subsequently, the New York City Landmarks Preservation Commission (LPC) hosted hearings in 1978 to discuss whether the Metropolitan clubhouse should be preserved as an official city landmark. The LPC granted the designation on September 11, 1979.

=== 1980s and 1990s ===
The Great Hall's stained-glass windows were restored in 1980 for $6,000. By the next year, the club had 484 life members and regular members; including limited-membership categories, the club had 2,367 total members. The membership, once composed of white men, included numerous women and South Americans. After Hamilton died in 1982, William Dawes Miller became the club's 19th president in 1984 and began replacing the club's management team. The Metropolitan implemented stricter financial safeguards after discovering that large amounts of food and drink could not be accounted for. To raise money for the clubhouse's maintenance, the Metropolitan created the One East Sixtieth Street Historical Foundation, a tax-exempt nonprofit organization, in 1985. Each member was asked to donate $120 annually to the foundation, and by 1985 the foundation was earning $150,000 a year for the clubhouse's upkeep. Due to changes in U.S. federal tax law, large donors to the foundation received substantial tax benefits.

Another proposal for a tower above the Metropolitan Club was announced in 1986, after the club encountered further financial and maintenance issues. The club wanted to sell the clubhouse's air rights to the Park Tower Realty Corporation for $17 million, and Park Tower hired James Stewart Polshek Partners to design a 37-to-39-story structure using these air rights. The tower would have been built above the original clubhouse's annex and northeastern corner, and it would have had 50 apartments. Although the project's supporters claimed the tower would include space for organizations and raise money for the club, local groups and preservationists objected to the plan on aesthetic grounds. The proposal needed approval from the LPC, but the agency rejected the proposed tower in late 1987, saying that the plan would negatively affect the clubhouse's structural integrity. After the tower was canceled, the Metropolitan Club started cleaning the clubhouse's facade in 1988 for more than $1 million. Frank Matero was hired to repaint the exterior and repair holes on the facade. Douglas Brandrup became the Metropolitan's 21st president in 1989, and the facade renovation was completed the next year.

By 1990, the Metropolitan had 2,200 members, including 100 women. Workers also renovated the interiors starting in the late 1980s. The project included connecting the ladies' dining room to the rest of the clubhouse; restoring the murals; and renovating the bedrooms. Several rooms on the first and second floors were rebuilt between 1990 and 1992 as well. Though the Canadian and Metropolitan clubs ended their partnership in 1993, many of the Canadian Club's members became full members of the Metropolitan. In the mid-1990s, the American Academy in Rome leased space in the eastern annex and in the rear wing. The firm of Byrns, Kendall & Schieferdecker was hired to renovate that space. During the late 1990s, the Metropolitan also renovated the second- and third-story rooms, re-gilded some window frames, replaced the elevators, and installed air-conditioning systems. Acheson Thornton Doyle was hired to restore the bedrooms.

=== 2000s to present ===
The Metropolitan Club began renovating the Great Hall in 1999, though the project was not completed for twelve years. The 60th Street sidewalk and one of the entrance colonnade's columns were rebuilt in 2000 after club members discovered damage there. In addition, the club began planning a rooftop dining area on the clubhouse's sixth floor, also designed by Acheson Thornton Doyle. Because the building was a city landmark, the club had to obtain permission from the LPC and local community groups. Starting in 2005, workers constructed a new kitchen and food-preparation area above the alley, and they rebuilt the roof to accommodate the new spaces. Workers also upgraded the existing clubhouse to bring it in line with modern building codes; for instance, the club widened the building's original staircases. The project experienced delays and budget overruns after workers discovered damage on the roof. The new main dining room on the roof opened in 2007, and food sales at the clubhouse doubled after the penthouse dining room was completed.

The Metropolitan continued to be dominated by older members. By 2010, the median age of members was 62, and one-tenth of members were 46 or younger. The club's main entrance gate was reinstalled in 2012 after being removed for renovation, and a business center opened at the club the next year. After Brandrup resigned as the club's president in 2013, Robert Strang took over. In 2023, the Metropolitan Club sued the neighboring Hotel Pierre, claiming that the hotel's operators had caused $450,000 worth of damage to the clubhouse during a renovation of the hotel. The club's members claimed that debris from the hotel had been falling onto the clubhouse for four years. In 2026, the club sold some development rights from the clubhouse's site to Extell Development for $40 million.

== Clubhouse ==
The site has a frontage of 100 feet (30 m) on Fifth Avenue and 200 feet (61 m) on 60th Street, at the northeast corner of these two streets. It faces Central Park and Grand Army Plaza to the west, the Pierre hotel to the north, and the Park Cinq building and the Sherry-Netherland hotel to the south. Stanford White of McKim, Mead & White designed the original building in the Italian Renaissance style. White also designed custom-made torchères on the sidewalk outside the clubhouse. The design of the clubhouse may have been patterned after various Italian palazzi, as well as palazzo-style English clubhouses. The east wing, erected in 1912, was designed by Ogden Codman Jr.

=== Exterior ===
==== Form ====
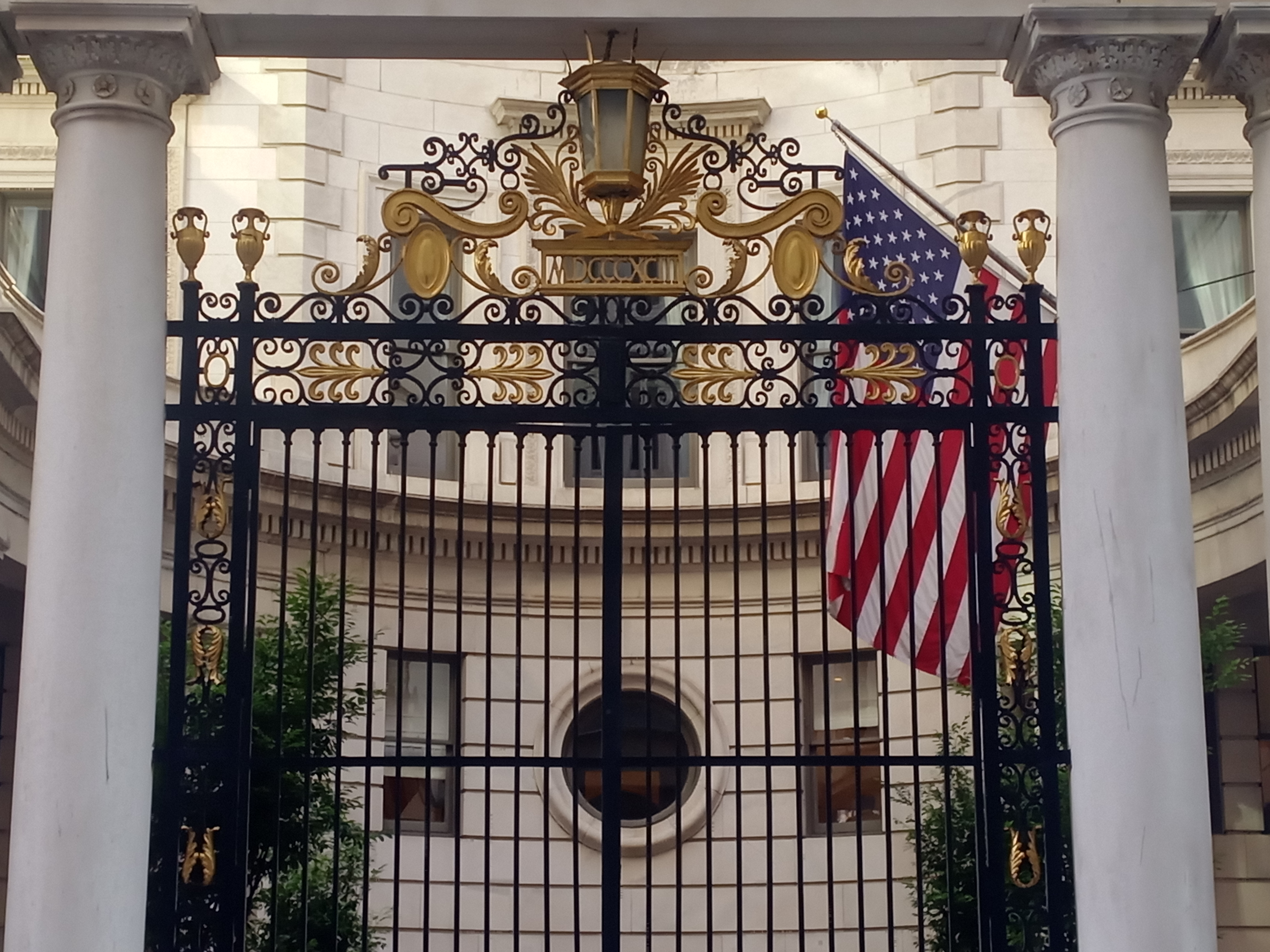
Entrance to the courtyard

The original clubhouse measures 142 by 90 feet (43 by 27 m), with the longer dimension on 60th Street, (Note: This has also been cited as 150 by 90 feet (46 by 27 m).) and has a rear wing measuring 55 by 40 feet (17 by 12 m). Though the original building is a four-story structure, it rises 104 feet (32 m) above street level. This is because each story has an average ceiling height of 25 feet (7.6 m), twice as high as normal buildings. The main entrance was placed on 60th Street, allowing the club to place its rooms along the entire Fifth Avenue frontage, facing Central Park. There is a penthouse with a dining room above the original building.

There is a courtyard to the east of the original building, which measures 55 by 60 feet (17 by 18 m) across. Behind the courtyard is the rear wing or women's annex, which rises two stories above ground. To the east of the original building is the east wing, which was built as a five-story bachelor apartment building before Codman redesigned it as a six-story dormitory. The clubhouse borders a 10-foot-wide (3.0 m) alleyway to the north, which is used as a service entrance. There was originally a lawn, hedges, and columns in front of the Fifth Avenue facade, which were demolished when Fifth Avenue was widened.

The eastern courtyard is placed behind a three-bay-wide colonnade with a central carriageway flanked by two pedestrian entrances. This colonnade is 34 feet (10 m) tall and consists of pairs of marble columns supporting an entablature. There was originally a third column in front of each pair, but they were removed when 60th Street was widened in 1922. The western and eastern ends of the colonnade are supported by square piers. Between each set of columns are wrought-iron gates designed by John Williams, a former employee of Tiffany & Co.

The design of the courtyard may have been inspired by a similar courtyard that McKim, Mead & White designed for the Villard Houses. The clubhouse's main entrance is on the western side of the courtyard, while the entrance to the rear wing is on the eastern side. These entrances are accessed by sidewalks on either side of the courtyard. There is a circular driveway in the courtyard, which originally allowed vehicles to drop passengers off at the clubhouse's porte-cochère. As designed, the central carriageway measured 16 feet (4.9 m) wide and 25 feet (7.6 m) tall, while the pedestrian entrances measured 8 feet (2.4 m) wide and 20 feet (6.1 m) tall. The ground story of the rear wing includes a niche, providing space for carriages within the courtyard to turn around.

==== Facade ====
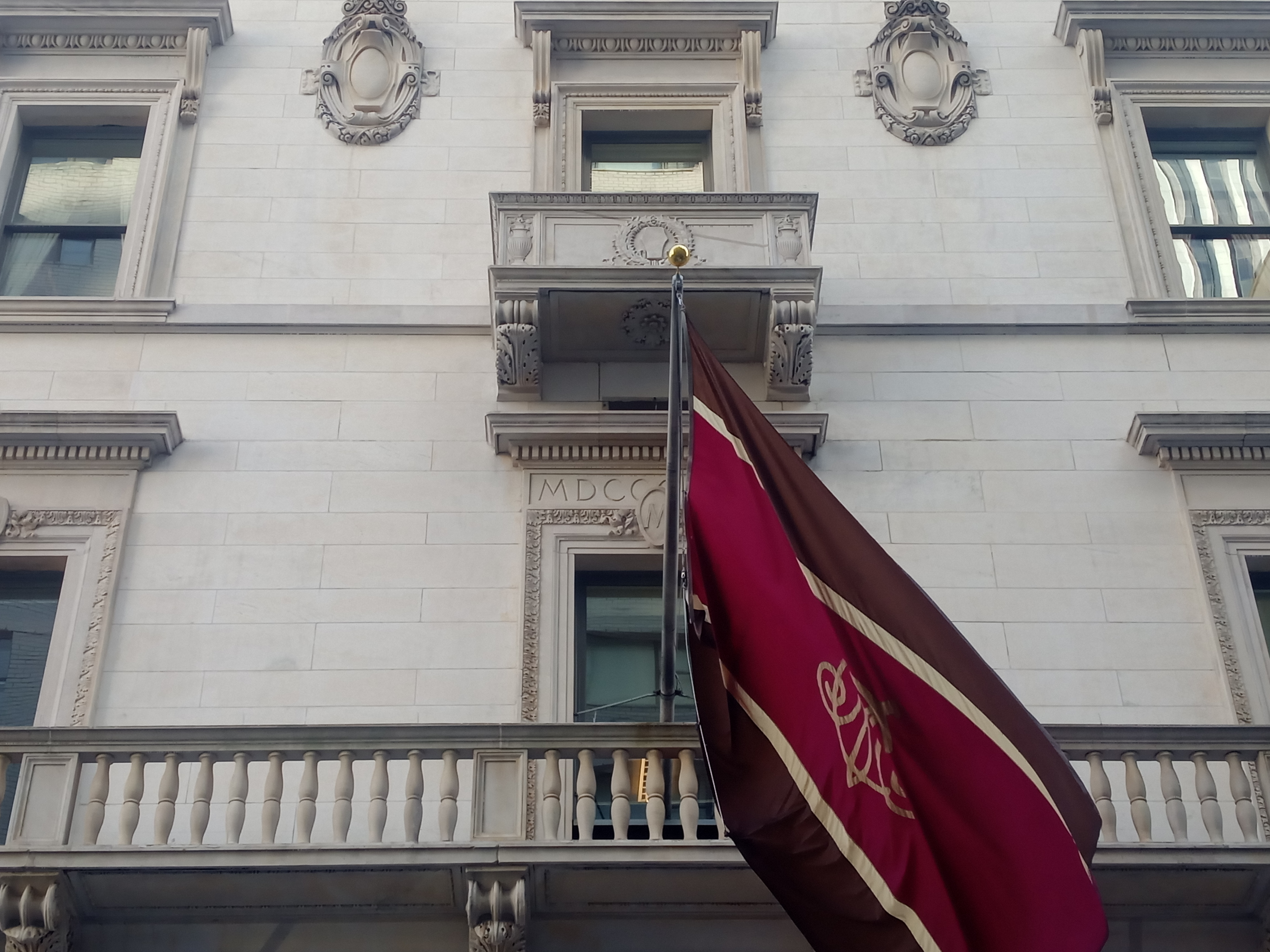
The center bays of the 60th Street facade at the 2nd and 3rd stories

The building was supposed to have been built out of white brick with marble trim, but these plans were subsequently changed so the clubhouse would be made entirely out of marble. At the time, some of the private houses on the same block were designed in the same style and made of the same material. The facade is mostly made of Vermont marble, while the ground story, trim, cornice, and balconies are made of Tuckahoe marble. The two types of marble weathered at different rates, and so the entire facade was repainted in a uniform color in 1965. The primary elevation of the Metropolitan clubhouse's facade faces south toward 60th Street and is divided vertically into seven bays, while the Fifth Avenue elevation is narrower, with five bays. Unlike contemporary clubhouses, the facade does not use any circular or arched motifs. Instead, horizontal courses and balconies are used to emphasize the horizontal lines on the facade. The exterior details are similar to those used in the now-demolished Marble Row three blocks south.

The facade's ground, or first, story is rusticated. The windows on the first story are larger than those above. A string course runs horizontally above the first floor, at the same level as the top of the courtyard's colonnade. The upper stories are composed of stone blocks with tight joints. At each corner of the facade above the first story are vertical bands of quoins.

The second and third stories have more ornate frames than the first-story windows and have egg-and-dart moldings. The second-story window frames have medallions bearing the letter M, and there is a three-bay-wide balcony at the second story on both the western and southern elevations. Above the central second-story window on 60th Street, Roman numerals spelling out the year 1892 are carved into the lintel. The third-story windows have similar windows to the second story, except the panels above the windows are plain. The balcony on the third story is one bay wide on both the western and southern elevations. The third-story windows are ornamented with wreaths flanked by hydria. There are also smaller windows for the first mezzanine and third mezzanine levels on the eastern elevation.

The fourth-story windows are much smaller than those on the other stories; they are square, exuding an attic-like effect. There are nine windows on the western elevation and 13 windows on the southern elevation, each decorated by festoons with fruit motifs. The cornice itself is 10 feet (3.0 m) high and protrudes 6 feet (1.8 m). The cornice is made of marble and copper, with modillions, dentils, and egg-and-dart moldings. The copper sections of the cornice were designed by Jackson Architectural Iron Works. There are 70 lion head motifs on the roof.

=== Interior ===
The clubhouse's interiors were designed as ornate spaces, in contrast to the relatively plain exterior; the rooms are designed in several architectural styles. Cherry, mahogany, and oak wood were used for the interiors, along with iron handrails and bronze lighting sconces. Numidian marble was used for the vestibules and main rooms, while the ceilings were painted in multiple colors. Several rooms had paneled woodwork on the walls and English-oak beams on the ceilings. Initially, the clubhouse used gas lights and an alternating current electrical system, which was replaced with a direct current system in the 1940s. In addition, the building originally had a hydraulic elevator, which was replaced with a cable-hauled elevator.

The French decorator Gilbert Cuel was hired to design the primary rooms in a French Baroque style, with relief panels and ceiling murals. Edward E. Simmons was hired to design the ceiling of the Metropolitan's library, and V. J. Hedden & Sons designed the interior woodwork. The Herter Brothers, F. Beck and Co., and C. R. Yandell & Co. also designed parts of the interior. One real-estate magazine described the interior spaces as "the loudest work of art [...] ever presented to an astonished American public". The historian Mosette Broderick described the clubhouse's interiors as having similar details to those in the Villard Houses.

==== First story and Great Hall ====
The building is entered through two vestibules with Guastavino tile ceiling vaults. The vestibule leads to the Great Hall, which extends through the second story and is variously cited as being 40 or 45 feet (12 or 14 m) high. At the Great Hall's north end is a double staircase to the second floor, which is made of marble with iron handrails. The Great Hall is decorated in the Italian Renaissance style with a palette of dark red and gold. The Great Hall has marble columns and walls, in addition to a marble floor with a checkerboard pattern. The hall has blue marble pillars with gilded-bronze capitals, which supported a coffered carved-wood ceiling decorated in red, gold, and blue. The space also has ornate decorative reliefs and white-marble doorways and mantelpiece. The hall is illuminated by five stained-glass windows on its northern end.

There were a lobby, office, and waiting room to the left (south) of the vestibule and a hat room to the right (north) of the Great Hall. There are also two lounges adjoining the main hall to the south and west. These spaces are decorated in the Louis XIV and Louis XV styles, with paintings, reliefs, upholstery, and red carpets. The main lounge measures 40 by 85 feet (12 by 26 m). The main lounge's ceiling is decorated with three paintings designed by Cuel, while the walls have reliefs of Renaissance figures. The smaller south lounge measures about 30 by 55 feet (9.1 by 16.8 m). Above these rooms was the Strangers' Wing, a mezzanine with a dining room and reception room for non-members; this was accessed by a separate entrance next to the main entrance vestibule. In 1990, a ladies' lounge was built next to the main entrance. The modern-day clubhouse has three primary spaces: the Great Hall, the West Lounge, and the Main Bar in the former south lounge.

Within the north wing, the ground story had a Louis XV–style dining room for ladies, which had a greenish-yellow color palette. The ladies' dining room was originally inaccessible from the rest of the clubhouse, but a passageway between them was completed in the early 1990s. Since 2013, the former ladies' dining room has served as a business center. A mezzanine floor above the ladies' dining room contained four smaller dining rooms decorated in differing color palettes. A staircase led to the mezzanine of the north wing, and a set of dressing rooms led off one of the staircase landings. In the basement are a bowling alley; rooms for the committees, board of directors, and stewards; storage space; and engine and boiler rooms.

==== Second story ====
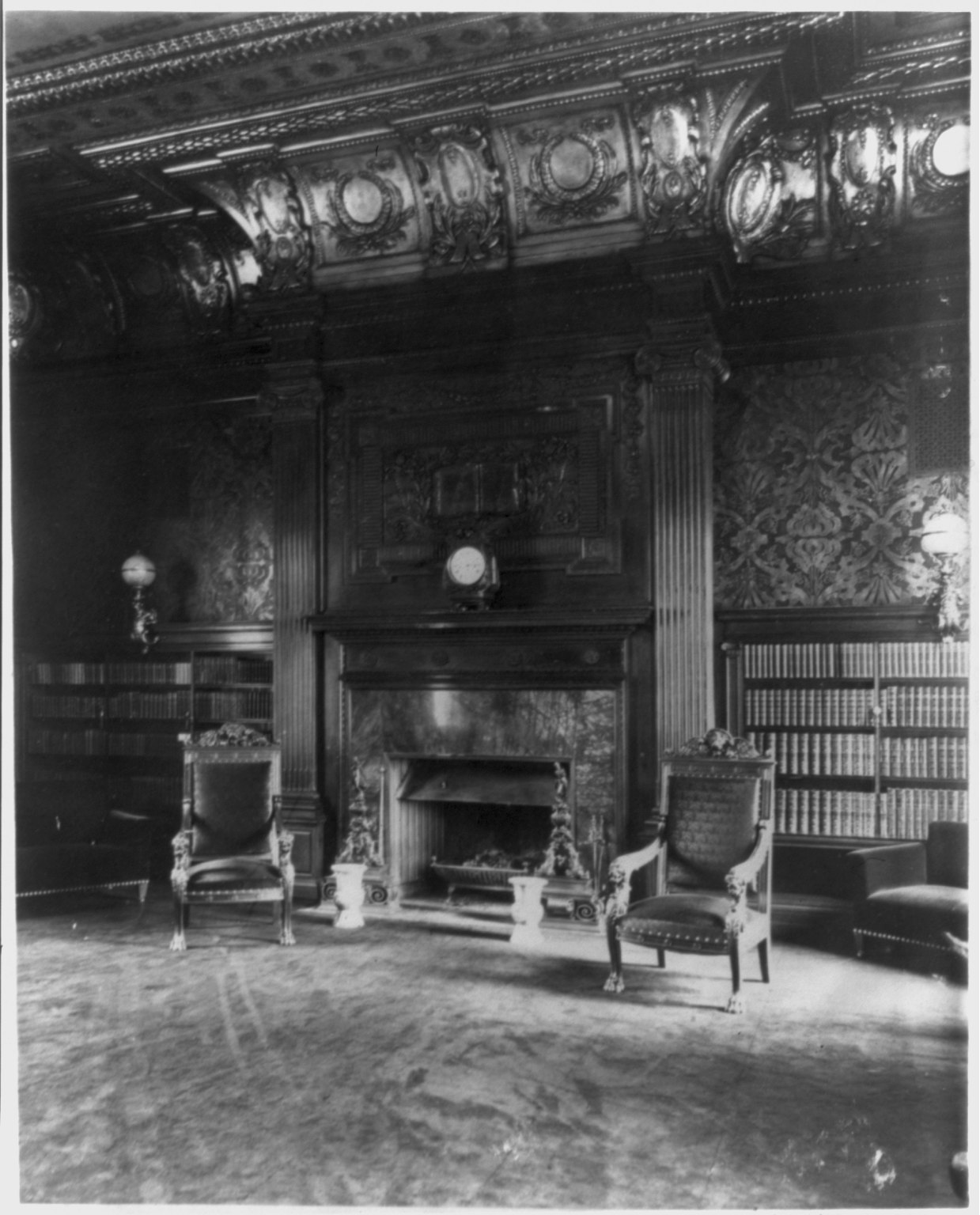
Interior of the library c. 1895

The club rooms were on the upper stories. As built, the second floor had a lounge at the southwest corner and a billiards room at the southeast corner, both of which measured about 30 by 60 feet (9.1 by 18.3 m). These spaces are known as the Governors' Room and L. W. James Room, respectively. The second floor also contained a writing room, two more card rooms, and a second billiards room. The second-floor rooms open onto a balcony surrounding the upper portion of the Great Hall.

On the rear wing's second floor is the library, which has a curved wall facing the courtyard. This library has oak bookcases along the lower half of the walls, while the upper half is covered with brown-and-gold leather. At the center of the ceiling is a long, oval skylight with pale yellow, pink, and white panels. The skylight is surrounded by a gilded coved ceiling with escutcheons, as well as irregularly shaped light-blue panels with Cupid motifs, both designed by Edward Simmons. There is also a fireplace, topped by a relief of an open book. The library had various local, national, and international newspapers when the clubhouse opened.

==== Third story ====
The rooms on the third floor were intended for "reading and correspondence". The third floor had a dining room, a breakfast room, a smoking room, three private dining rooms, an anteroom, and service rooms. A barrel-vaulted hall led to the dining rooms. The main dining room to the west was decorated in the Louis XIV style, with walls painted in a white, pink, and yellow palette. The paneling on the main dining room's walls contained reliefs with depictions of Cupid, fruits, and other decorations, while the cornice was decorated with gilded console brackets and trophy motifs. There were also painted white-and-gold reliefs on the ceiling. The smaller dining rooms were decorated in the First Empire style and were predominantly painted red.

The third-floor rooms were originally labeled A through E but were named for Metropolitan Club leaders in the 1950s. As of 2024, the main dining room is known as the Presidents' Ballroom, while the private dining rooms to the east have been combined into the J. P. Morgan Room. Two additional rooms to the south, originally the breakfast and smoking rooms, are known as the L. P. Morton and F. K. Sturgis rooms. The original main dining room is generally open only for special events.

==== Bedroom spaces and top stories ====
There were servants' bedrooms on a mezzanine above the private dining rooms. The attic ceilings were the lowest in the entire clubhouse. This story contained 22, 26, or 35 bedroom suites for members, each with a bathroom. On the roof were servant spaces such as a kitchen, laundry, pantry, and dining room. There was also a roof garden with an awning, which was open during the summer months. A dumbwaiter connected the kitchen with the dining spaces below. Additional bedrooms on the third mezzanine were built in 1971. These bedrooms originally had metal doorways and dropped ceilings, which were removed in the 1990s. A main dining room, with terraces surrounding it, is located on the roof.

=== Architectural commentary ===
When the clubhouse opened, one writer for Stone magazine said the Metropolitan Club's building "afforded an agreeable contrast" to the variety of commercial and residential buildings nearby. Vogue magazine wrote that "no more beautiful example of architecture is to be seen in New York". By contrast, The Art Amateur magazine disdained the clubhouse, saying that the design was bland but not vulgar and that the entrance hall and stairway were unwelcoming. A critic for Architectural Record magazine thought the attic windows detracted from the design and that the cornice was too thick. The New York Times wrote that the layout of the clubhouse's interior was "simple and intelligible" and likened the building to a grand palace. Scientific American Building Edition regarded the interior as successful though it described the Great Hall as cold and severe compared with the other rooms.

When Stanford White died in 1906, The New York Times called the clubhouse "the handsomest and most complete clubhouse in the world". The Times wrote in 1945 that "the exterior and interior design are outstanding examples of Mr. White's genius". Town and Country wrote in 1973 that "other clubs envy its classic courtyard, ubiquitous marble, and dazzling double staircase". Two years later, Brendan Gill wrote that the clubhouse had been developed when White was "at his grandest and most self-confident". A critic for Newsday wrote in 1990 that the clubhouse was "a splendid palace, fit for kings of industry". In a 1994 book about New York City's architecture, the writer Donald Reynolds stated that "the lines of the building are clean and fine and the proportions monumental".

== Membership and governance ==
=== Board of governors ===
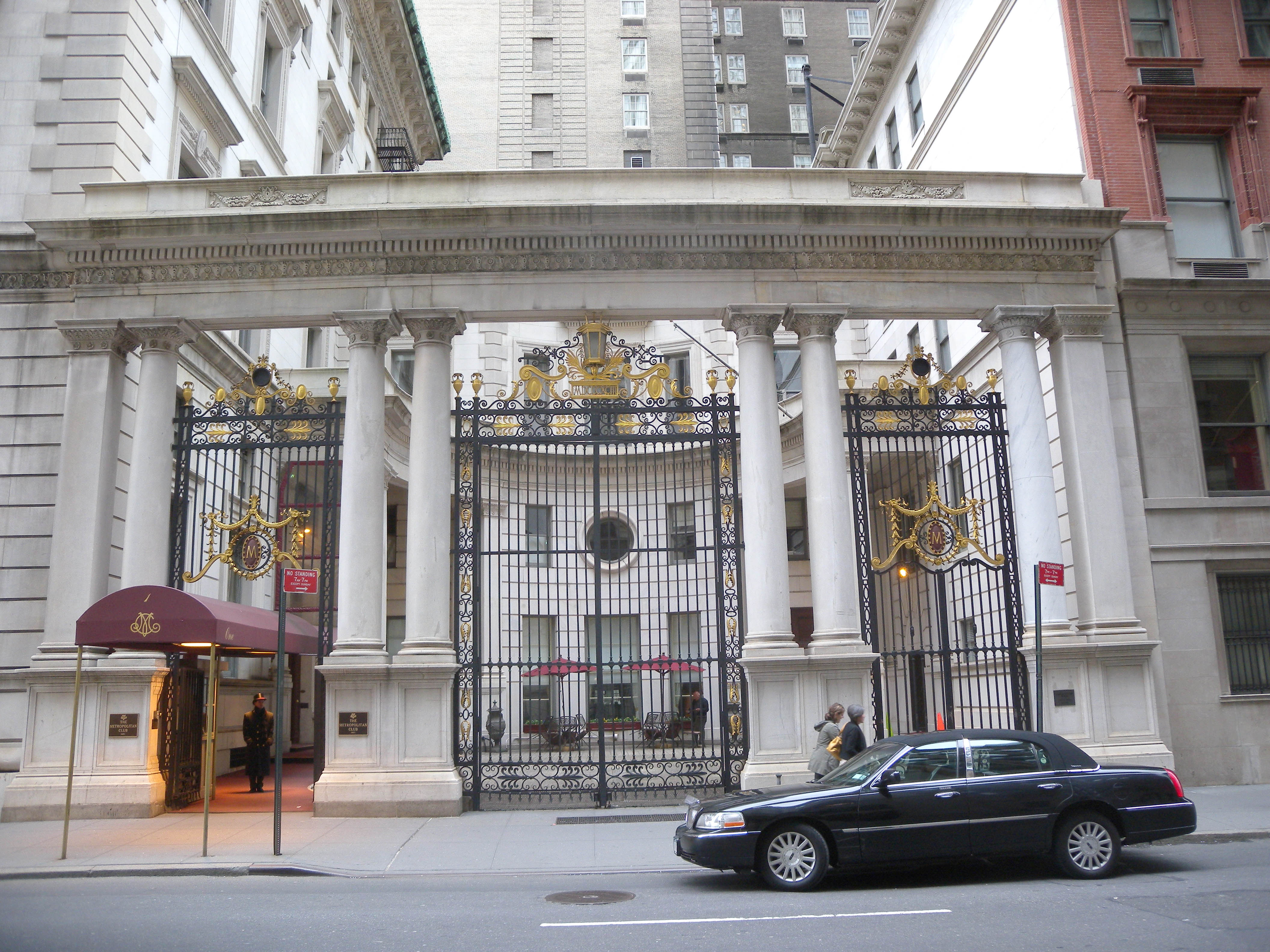
Entrance on East 60th Street

When the Metropolitan Club was founded, it was controlled by a board of governors. At least nine of the 25 governors had to be present at any meeting to approve rule changes. A five-member executive committee controlled day-to-day operations, meeting every week to discuss topics such as staff firing and hiring, supplies, and prices. The club's flag originally included the initials MC in red and blue, placed on a white background.

=== Members and guests ===
All members have to pay an initiation fee plus annual dues; resident members paid higher dues than non-resident members. When the club was formed, potential members had to be at least 21 years old, and the Metropolitan Club's board of governors had to vote on whether to accept a prospective member. Members could be "blackballed", or rejected, if at least one-ninth of the governors voted against them. The club's bylaws also permitted the board of governors to request that resident members pay additional annual dues. The club's membership book includes the original constitution, and each member must sign the membership book when they join. The original bylaws allowed servicemembers to pay half the usual dues; this privilege was extended to clergy members in 1940. Since 1989, prospective members can be nominated only by existing members. Any potential member under age 35 is classified as a junior member and does not pay initiation fees. Membership is restricted to 750 resident and 750 non-resident members.

Initially, only men could be members, and they had to send a letter of inquiry to be considered for membership. The club began allowing widows to become members in 1935, and it also introduced the Annual Lady Guest Privilege by the 1960s, which had to be re-approved every year. Any woman could become a member starting in 1974, and members of affiliated clubs could receive resident associate and non-resident associate memberships. In its early years, the Metropolitan also offered temporary membership privileges to members of other clubs and groups; these privileges usually lasted no longer than three months. For instance, the Metropolitan's board allowed members of the Knickerbocker, University, and Union clubs to use the clubhouse while these clubs were developing their own buildings. Certain prominent public figures could also be designated as honorary life guests starting in 1959. In addition, members who had been part of the club for more than 50 years could also qualify for a special title starting in 1963.

Many members were also affiliated with other clubs. For example, nine of the Metropolitan Club's founders were part of the Coaching Club of New York, and the Coaching Club's springtime parades started at the Metropolitan clubhouse beginning in the 1890s. Seven Metropolitan Club members founded the United Hunts Racing Association at the clubhouse in 1905, and 38 guests founded the India House at the Metropolitan in 1914. In addition, the clubhouse hosted meetings for other clubs such as the Maplewood Institute Association, the Hobby Club, and the Indoor Polo Association. Metropolitan Club members also established their own mini-clubs within the clubhouse, including a dinner club and a group named the "Busybodies' Associates".

==== Member amenities ====
The club provided several amenities for its members. For example, there were originally horse-drawn carriages traveling from the clubhouse to the intersection of Sixth Avenue and 53rd Street, where club members could transfer to elevated trains. The executive committee also arranged with the New York Cab Company and with a cab operator to provide hansom cab service to club members. For a fee, members could park their bicycles in the clubhouse.

There is a fitness center in the basement for male members, while female members have to use other health clubs nearby. The club's dining room functions as a members-only restaurant, and a wine committee has selected drinks for the club since 1995. In addition to the business center, there are phone systems and fax machines throughout the clubhouse. In addition, the Metropolitan has reciprocal agreements with other clubs worldwide, such as the Jockey Club and California Club; members of the Metropolitan receive benefits from these clubs and vice versa. The club also hosts cocktail parties for new members each year, and it gives commemorative pins to people who have been members for at least 25 or 50 years.

When the clubhouse opened in 1894, the bedrooms in the attic were rented out at different rates depending on the size of the room. The club's bylaws initially dictated that each apartment have no more than two bedrooms and one bathroom. Two valets staffed the bedrooms. Some of these rooms were rented out for long periods of time; for example, the magnate Henry E. Huntington lived in a pair of rooms for several years while he was curating the Huntington Library collection. Originally, women were allowed into the bedrooms only if they were married to existing members. By the 21st century, the bedrooms were regularly fully booked, and they were also renovated every few years. Members of clubs with reciprocal agreements were also allowed to use the bedrooms.

==== House rules ====
The Metropolitan's original house rules banned women and non-members from the main clubhouse. At the time, very few men's social clubs in New York City allowed women to enter their clubhouses, and a commentator for The New York Sun believed that the mere presence of women "is likely to bring about changes" to other clubs. Female visitors were originally banned from the main clubhouse, although they were allowed into the two-story rear wing, which male members could enter only if accompanied by a woman. These privileges only applied to women who were living with members. Male non-members could use the strangers' wing for up to one week and could be invited to the strangers' dining room as frequently as once per week. Non-members were also allowed into the north wing by 1898, and the club began allowing non-members into the great hall and the dining rooms in 1944. As late as the 1970s, one member alleged that his membership had been revoked when he invited a black person as a guest.

Smoking was banned in most parts of the clubhouse; as smoking became more socially acceptable, this restriction was gradually repealed until, by 1925, smoking was allowed everywhere except for the rear wing. The Metropolitan Club maintains a dress code as part of its house rules. Men are required to wear jackets and ties, while women are required to wear dresses, pantsuits, or skirts. The dress code also prohibits informal clothing such as T-shirts, jeans, and shorts. Cellphones and laptops have also been banned in most rooms. The club's business center is exempted from the dress code and electronics ban. In addition, the dress code is relaxed for certain events at the clubhouse.

The club's board of governors has expelled or reprimanded members who have violated house rules. In the club's early years, the board most frequently penalized members who had not paid their debts or who had been caught falsifying checks.

== Activities ==
Like other Gilded Age social clubs, the Metropolitan Club functioned largely as a meeting place for the wealthy. During January and February of each year, members of high society tended to congregate in New York City, and the club hosted several high-society events. Meetings, receptions, and luncheons took place in the northern annex and in the strangers' dining room, and there were business dinners as well. In its early years, the clubhouse also hosted "ladies' days", where women were allowed to enter member-only portions of the clubhouse, as well as dances hosted by members' wives. In addition, the club hosted Grand National Sweepstakes Dinner on the night before the Grand National, and it presented lectures on Sunday afternoons during the 1930s. The clubhouse has held many business events; for example, several club members formed the U.S. Steel corporation at one such meeting in 1901.

During the mid-20th century, the club marketed the clubhouse as a venue for events such as debutante balls. The women's committee began organizing events at the club in 1963, and the committee hosted its first debutante ball in 1965 or 1966. The Metropolitan's debutante balls are open only to relatives of members, so each ball usually features four to eight women, compared to public balls with up to 75 debutantes. Other events hosted during the late 20th century included the Doric Debutante Cotillion and monthly dinner dances. By the 21st century, heads of state, diplomats, celebrities, businesspeople, and other high-profile figures were often invited to events at the club. Most of the largest events took place toward the end of each year. The club's annual events include Christmas celebrations, formal balls, golf tournaments, and game dinners.

No images of the club's first social gatherings exist, as the club banned photographs of the clubhouse's interiors. The club continued to prohibit journalists and onlookers during the early 21st century. As such, the club does not host fashion shows, and it rarely hosts political events and movie premiere parties.

The billiards rooms and card rooms were some of the clubhouse's most popular spaces for entertainment, and the club had committees for games such as billiards, bridge, gin rummy, and backgammon. Members also frequently participated in other pastimes, such as bowling and bicycling. The club continues to host billiards and bridge games in the 21st century.

== Notable members ==
=== Founders ===
The club had 25 founders. Some were members of families who had long dominated New York City society, while others were lawyers, art patrons, and bankers. Nearly all of the club's original members were Episcopalians with English or Dutch ancestry. Notable founders include:

- Samuel D. Babcock, banker
- John Lambert Cadwalader, lawyer
- Robert Goelet, real estate developer
- Ogden Goelet, real estate developer
- George G. Haven, Jr., businessman
- Adrian Iselin Jr., banker
- Charles D. Lanier, railroad executive
- J. P. Morgan, financier, banker, philanthropist, art collector, and the club's founder and first president
- Augustus Newbold Morris, socialite
- James A. Roosevelt, merchant
- Cornelius Vanderbilt II, industrialist, philanthropist
- William Kissam Vanderbilt, horse breeder
- J. M. Waterbury, businessman and polo player
- George P. Wetmore, politician
- William Collins Whitney, United States Secretary of the Navy and financier
- Egerton Leigh Winthrop, lawyer

=== Other notable members ===
The club's members have long included people in high-paying professions, such as bankers, industrialists, doctors, lawyers, and CEOs. By the 21st century, the club's members also included those in the technology industry. Although the club did not have any black members as late as the 1990s, its membership has become more ethnically diverse over time. Due to conflict-of-interest laws, active U.S. servicemembers and diplomats cannot become members, though retired diplomats and servicemembers have been allowed to join.

- Alexander Agassiz, scientist and engineer
- George E. Allen, lawyer
- Nelson W. Aldrich, banker
- Winthrop W. Aldrich, banker
- John Jacob Astor IV, businessman
- John Jacob Astor VI, businessman
- William Waldorf Astor, businessman and politician
- Hugh D. Auchincloss Sr., merchant and businessman
- George Fisher Baker, financier
- James Gordon Bennett Jr., publisher
- Edward Julius Berwind, industrialist
- Spruille Braden, diplomat and businessman
- Nicholas Murray Butler, educator
- John Catsimatidis, businessman
- Clark M. Clifford, U.S. Defense Secretary
- William Ellis Corey, businessman
- Arthur Vining Davis, businessman
- Chauncey Depew, politician
- Clarence Dillon, banker
- Frank Nelson Doubleday, publisher
- Alexis I. du Pont Bayard, lawyer and politician
- Henry Francis du Pont, collector
- Pierre S. du Pont, businessman
- T. Coleman du Pont, engineer and politician
- Frederick H. Ecker, businessman
- Lincoln Ellsworth, explorer
- Thomas B. Ferguson, diplomat
- Marshall Field, businessman
- Hamilton Fish, politician
- Frederick T. Frelinghuysen, politician
- Henry Clay Frick, businessman
- David H. Greer, rector
- E. H. Harriman, financier
- W. Averell Harriman, businessman and politician
- Theodore Havemeyer, industrialist
- John Hay, diplomat
- Charles M. Hays, industrialist
- Henry Lee Higginson, businessman
- Conrad Hilton, businessman
- Henry E. Huntington, businessman
- George Pratt Ingersoll, lawyer and ambassidor
- Samuel Insull, businessman
- Arthur Curtiss James, financier
- John Innes Kane, scientist
- David H. King Jr., contractor
- George Goelet Kip, lawyer
- Samuel Henry Kress, businessman
- Thomas W. Lamont, banker
- Edward Eugene Loomis, railroad executive
- Seth Low, politician
- Daniel K. Ludwig, businessman
- Clarence Mackay, financier
- Robert Maclay, merchant, business executive, and civic activist
- Manton Marble, journalist
- Frederick Townsend Martin, writer and advocate
- Joseph A. Martino, businessman
- Ward McAllister, socialite
- Cyrus McCormick, inventor and businessman
- Joseph V. McKee, politician
- Charles Follen McKim, architect
- Andrew Mellon, businessman
- Richard B. Mellon, businessman
- William Dawes Miller, engineer
- Charles E. Mitchell, banker
- Dwight Morrow, banker
- Levi P. Morton, politician
- Robert Moses, urban planner
- Thomas Newbold, politician
- Floyd Odlum, businessman
- Charles May Oelrichs, broker and clubman
- Hermann Oelrichs, businessman
- Olav V, king of Norway
- Edwin B. Parker, lawyer and public official
- George Browne Post, architect
- Percy Rivington Pyne II, financier
- John J. Raskob, businessman
- Whitelaw Reid, journalist and diplomat
- Gordon Rentschler, banker
- Elihu Root, lawyer and statesman
- Clendenin J. Ryan, businessman
- Thomas Fortune Ryan, businessman
- Augustus Saint-Gaudens, sculptor
- Charles M. Schwab, businessman
- William E. Simon, U.S. Treasury Secretary
- Alfred P. Sloan, businessman
- James Stillman, banker
- Benjamin Strong Jr., banker
- William L. Strong, politician
- Frank K. Sturgis, banker
- Charles H. Tenney, merchant and banker
- Louis Comfort Tiffany, designer
- Frank Vanderlip, banker
- Marilyn vos Savant, writer, World's Highest IQ in Guinness Book of Records
- Thomas J. Watson, businessman
- Grover Whalen, politician
- Stanford White, architect
- William Payne Whitney, businessman
- Charles A. Whittier, military general
- Albert H. Wiggin, banker
- James T. Woodward, banker

In addition, various non-members have been named as honorary life guests, including military personnel and heads of state. These have included Harold Alexander, William R. Anderson, Edward L. Beach Jr., Winston Churchill, Garrison H. Davidson, Frederick H. Ecker, Frederik IX, Alfred M. Gruenther, Ingrid of Sweden, Douglas MacArthur, Richard C. Patterson Jr., Arthur W. Radford, and Albert C. Wedemeyer. Former U.S. presidents Herbert Hoover, Dwight D. Eisenhower, Richard Nixon, Gerald Ford, and Ronald Reagan were also given life memberships.

Over the years, several prospective members have been rejected. For example, U.S. Senator Edward O. Wolcott was reportedly rejected in 1894 because club members did not like that he advocated for silver coinage, and church rector William S. Rainsford was also rejected that year. The financier Charles Yerkes was also reportedly rejected from the club.

== See also ==
- List of New York City Designated Landmarks in Manhattan from 59th to 110th Streets
- List of traditional gentlemen's clubs in the United States
