= Wiggin =

Wiggin is a surname, and may refer to

- Albert H. Wiggin (1868–1951), American banker
- Alfred J. Wiggin (1823–1883), American artist
- Andrew Wiggin (judge) (1671–1756), American colonial period judge
- Bill Wiggin (born 1966), British politician
- Sir Charles Wiggin (1922–1977), British diplomat, ambassador to Spain
- Charles Wiggin (rower) (born 1950), British rower
- Evelyn Prescott Wiggin (1900–1964), American mathematician and university professor
- Frances Turgeon Wiggin (1891–1985), American author and composer
- Sir Henry Wiggin (1824–1905), British metals manufacturer and politician
- James Henry Wiggin (1836–1900), American Unitarian minister and editor
- Sir Jerry Wiggin (Alfred William Wiggin, 1937–2015), British Conservative Party politician
- Kate Douglas Wiggin (1856–1923), American children's author
- Maurice Wiggin, English journalist
- Paul Wiggin (1934–2025), American football player
- Samuel Adams Wiggin (1832–1899), American poet and secretary to Presidents Johnson and Grant
- Thomas Wiggin (1592–1667), early governor in New Hampshire
- Tom Wiggin (born 1955), American actor, writer and entrepreneur
- Wiggin baronets

Fictional characters from the Ender's Game series:

- Ender Wiggin
- John Paul Wiggin
- Peter Wiggin
- Theresa Wiggin
- Valentine Wiggin

== See also ==
- Wiggins (surname)
