= Wiggins =

Wiggins may refer to:

== Places ==
- Wiggins, Alabama, United States, an unincorporated community
- Wiggins, Colorado, United States, a statutory town
- Wiggins, Leake County, Mississippi, United States, an unincorporated community
- Wiggins, Stone County, Mississippi, United States, a city and county seat
- Wiggins, Durban, a black residential area in central Durban, KwaZulu-Natal, South Africa
- 4099 Wiggins, an asteroid

== Other uses ==
- Bradley Wiggins, a British cyclist
- Wiggins (surname), a list of people
- Mrs. Wiggins, a character played by Carol Burnett in comedy sketches
- Wiggins (Sherlock Holmes character)
- Wiggins, a character in Wiggins in Storyland, a 1994 educational computer game
- Wiggins Airways, an American cargo airline
- Team Wiggins Le Col, a British cycling team

== See also ==
- Wiggins Formation, a geologic formation in Wyoming, United States
- Wiggins Hill, a hamlet in Warwickshire, England
- Wiggins v. Smith, a 2003 United States Supreme Court case
- Wiggin, a surname
