= William Dawes (disambiguation) =

William Dawes (1745–1799) was an American notable for his actions in the American Revolution.

William Dawes may also refer to:

- Sir William Dawes, 3rd Baronet (1671–1724), Bishop of Chester and Archbishop of York
- William Dawes (British Marines officer) (1762–1836), British Marines officer, pioneer in New South Wales, governor of Sierra Leone, astronomer, and abolitionist
- William Rutter Dawes (1799–1868), British astronomer
- William Dawes (abolitionist), American abolitionist and fund raiser for Oberlin College in 1840
- William Bower Dawes (1807–1869), South Australian politician

== See also ==
- William Dawe, author
- William Dawes Miller, engineer
