= Senator Wiggins =

Senator Wiggins may refer to:

- Brice Wiggins (born 1971), Mississippi State Senate
- Harry Wiggins (1932–2004), Missouri State Senate
- Pat Wiggins (1940–2013), California State Senate
