= James Henry Wiggin =

Unitarian minister

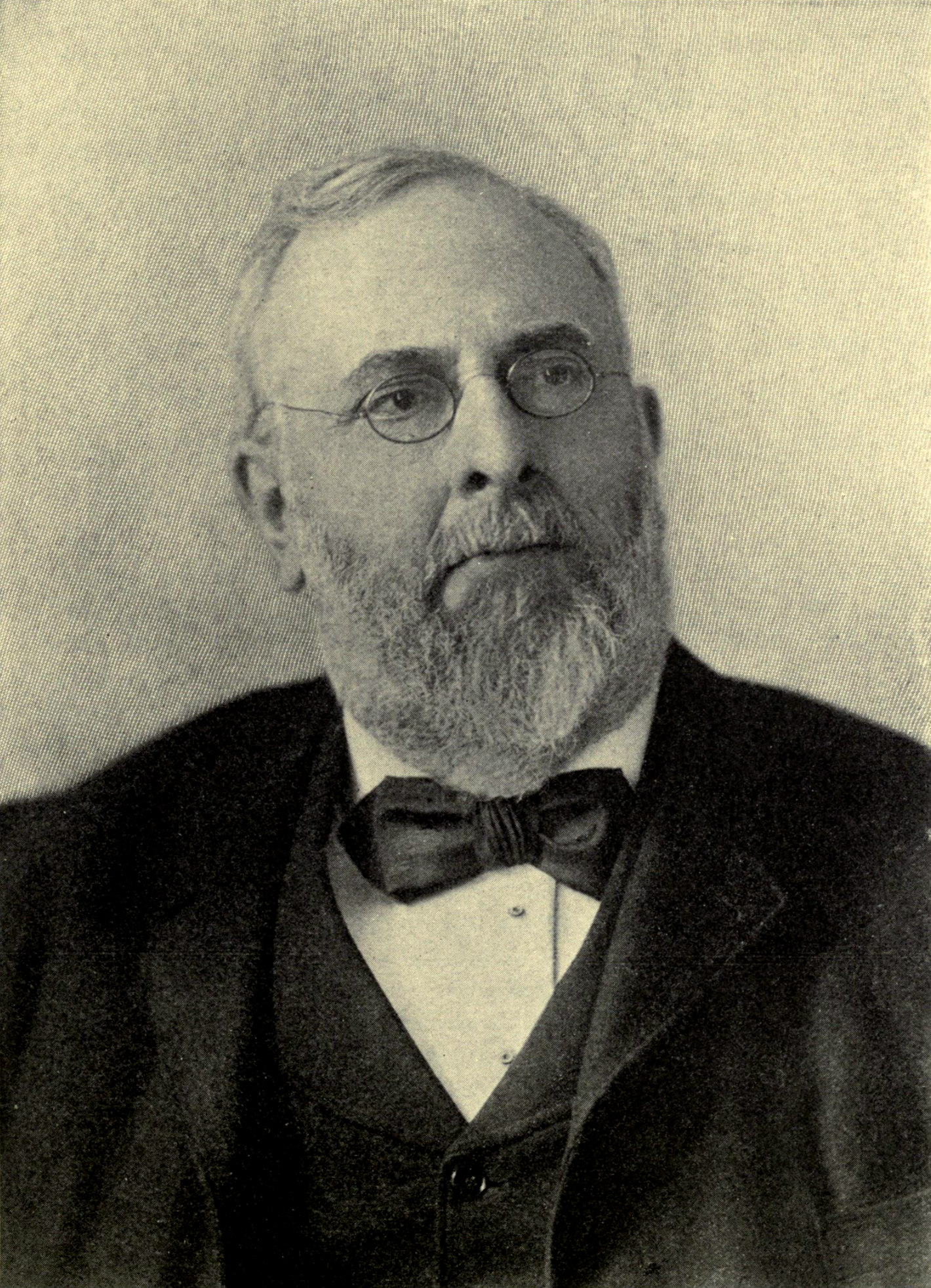
- Born: May 14, 1836; Boston
- Died: Nov 3, 1900 (aged 64); Roxbury, Mass.

James Henry Wiggin (May 14, 1836 - November 3, 1900) was a Unitarian minister. He also worked as an editor and proofreader.

== Biography ==
Wiggin studied at Dwight Grammar School and Tufts College, and was well traveled in Europe, the Middle East, and Asia, he graduated in 1861 from Meadville Theological School, becoming a Unitarian minister in 1862. After serving a number of pulpits in Massachusetts for a few years he left the ministry, "believing that his radical opinions did not justify a longer continuance in his chosen work" (although there may have been financial reasons as well), and chose a career in writing and editing, which included editing for the Liberal Christian. He often worked with his friend John Wilson of University Press as a proofreader, and was well known in Boston literary circles.

Wilson at the time was the publisher for Mary Baker Eddy's book Science and Health, and introduced Wiggin to Eddy as a possible literary advisor to help her as she rewrote the book while at the same time teaching at the Massachusetts Metaphysical College and serving as pastor for the Church of Christ, Scientist. Eddy also wanted Wiggin to proofread her book as a result of criticism that it was hard to understand. She once wrote him to "never change my meaning, only bring it out."[sic.] However, Eddy ended up not using many of his revisions, or taking them out in later editions, such as the "trendy references to Eastern religions" as author Gillian Gill called them. He helped her prepare the index which appeared for the first time in the sixteenth edition, but was removed in later editions, and helped prepare the book for the printers. Wiggin also worked as an editor of The Christian Science Journal on and off from 1886 to 1889. He wrote articles in volumes three and four of the Journal under the pseudonym "Phare Pleigh" during that time; many of them defending Christian Science from attacks from various clergymen. He issued a pamphlet called Christian Science and the Bible in response to one clergyman in California.

He never became a member of the religion however, and began to be privately critical of Christian Science around 1891, around the time when Eddy severed their business relationship, although she remained in occasional friendly contact with him. Gill writes that it is likely he was embarrassed at being let go of by a woman at a time when it was rare for men to work under women in the first place, and was upset at being seen as an "intellectual advisor, rather than a copy editor" whose advice was so often ignored. He remained very respectful towards her in public however, even after leaving her employment.

At some point, probably after Wiggin had left Eddy's employ, rumors began to appear that he was a "ghostwriter" for Eddy, but Gill argues this was a "willful misrepresentation of the truth." Livingston Wright, a friend of Wiggin's, was likely the source of the rumors, which were extremely popular with critics of Eddy. After Wiggin's death, Wright published his claims in the New York World, which was running articles attacking Eddy at the time. William B. Reid, Wilson's clerk and a close friend of Wiggin, who was intimately involved in the printing of the editions which Wright claimed Wiggin had written, called the accusations "a lie." William Dana Orcutt, who was also involved in the printing of those editions, said "It would have been impossible for any of [the pages] to be in Mr. Wiggin's handwriting or of his authorship without having it apparent to everyone in the proofreading department." He said farther that he remembers Wiggin complaining to him on many occasions of "the difficulty he had in trying to persuade Mrs. Eddy to accept his suggestions, and he seemed to be somewhat chagrined by that fact," and that in his years of knowing Wiggin there was never "the slightest suggestion on his part that he was entitled to any credit beyond faithful service to an author in assisting her to keep the manuscript consistent and clear."

== Family ==
In 1864, Wiggin married Laura Emma Newman of Brattleboro, Vermont. They had two sons: Albert H. Wiggin, a noted banker; and Langley Wiggin.
