= Samuel Adams Wiggin =

American poet

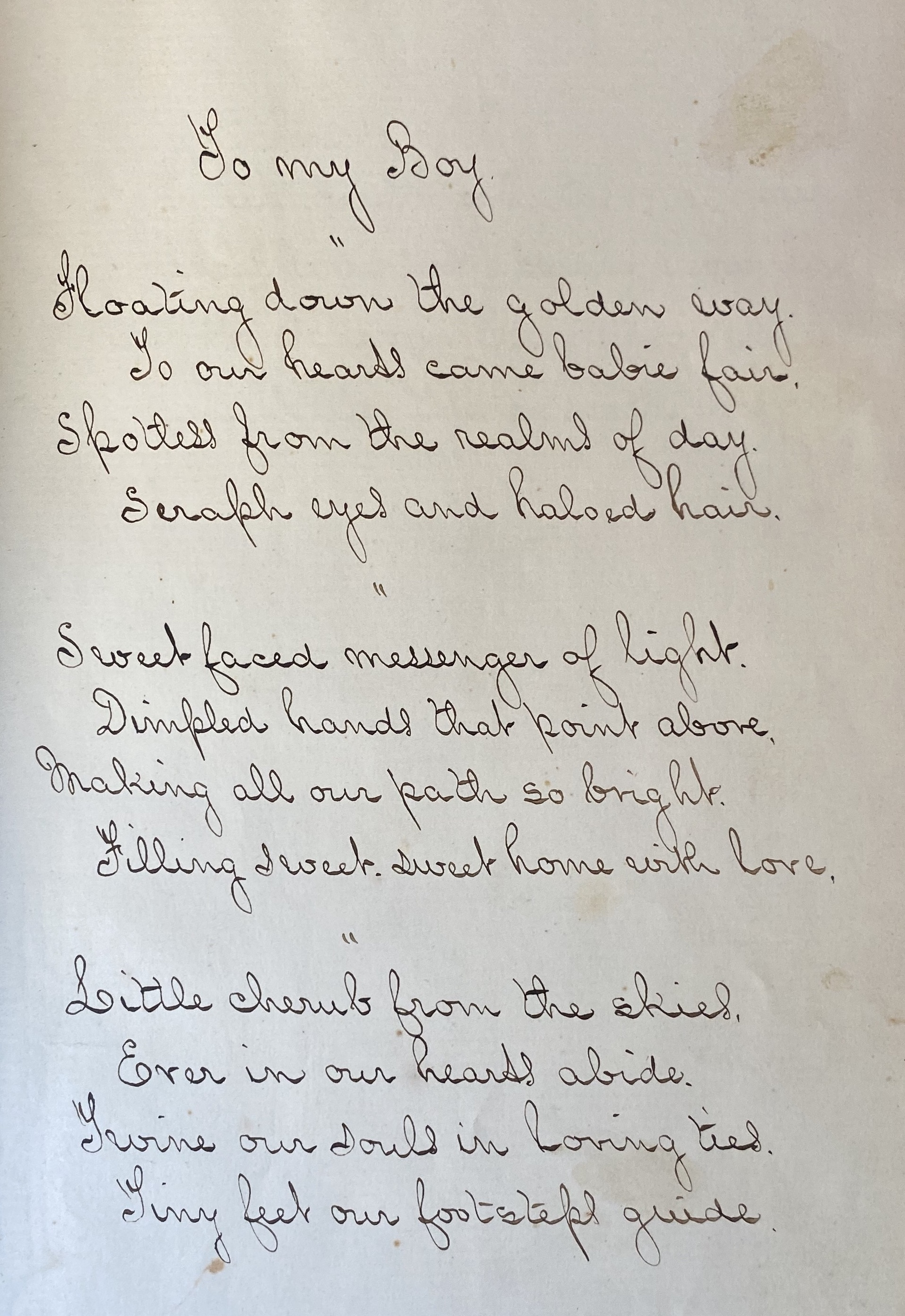
Manuscript original of "To My Boy"

Samuel Adams Wiggin (1832–1899) was an American poet, born in Portsmouth, New Hampshire, on May 27, 1832.

Wiggin pursued a military career until Vice President Andrew Johnson became president after the assassination of Abraham Lincoln in 1865. He was then appointed executive clerk or private secretary to President Johnson, a position which he held for eight years and three months.

He died on July 15, 1899, at his home, named Fernwood, in Washington, DC, following a fall down a flight of stairs.

== Poetry ==
Many of his poems were published in newspapers of the day and were written in Poets' Corner in the White House. His published work has over 200 poems, including a satirical piece against Darwin's On the Origin of Species. Other subjects include patriotism, the Rebellion (civil war), slavery, religious matters and various family members.
