= Justice Wiggins =

Justice Wiggins may refer to:

- David Wiggins (jurist) Justice of the Iowa Supreme Court
- Charles K. Wiggins Justice of the Washington Supreme Court
