= Joseph A. Martino =

Joseph A. Martino (circa 1900–1983) was an American businessperson and administrator.

== Early life ==
Martino was born in New York. He studied and graduated from Columbia University and Pace University in 1922.

== Career ==
Martino joined NL Industries in 1916 and became the president in 1947.

In 1958, he appointed a commissioner of the Port Authority by Nelson Rockefeller.

As a philanthropist, in the 1950s and 1960s, he funded the construction of Lincoln Center campus. Fordham Building is named in his honor.

== Awards and recognition ==
- Insignis Medal (1963)
