= Brice Wiggins =

American politician

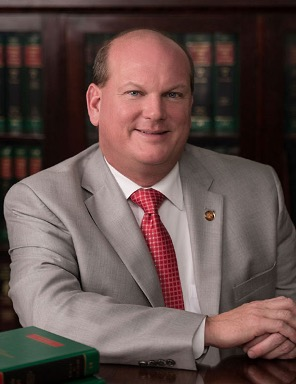
- Brice Wiggins

Member of the Mississippi State Senate from the 52nd district
- Incumbent
- Assumed office January 3, 2012
- Preceded by: T.O. "Tommy" Moffatt

Personal details
- Born: August 8, 1971 (age 54) Irving, Texas, U.S.
- Party: Republican
- Education: Pascagoula High School
- Alma mater: Tulane University (BS); Mississippi College (JD)
- Occupation: Lawyer, politician
- Website: https://bricewiggins.net/

Christopher "Brice" Wiggins is an American lawyer and politician. He serves as a Republican member of the Mississippi State Senate representing Mississippi's District 52, which includes the cities of Pascagoula and Ocean Springs.

== Early life ==
Brice Wiggins was born on August 8, 1971, in Irving, Texas. His father, Dr. Chris Wiggins, works as an orthopedic surgeon in and served as Legislative Doctor of the Day at the Mississippi State Capitol in 2014. He is the great-grandson of Ed Wiggins, mayor of Pascagoula in the 1950s.

Wiggins was educated at Pascagoula High School and was drum major of the high school band his senior year. He graduated in 1989 with distinction.

He graduated from Tulane University in 1993 with a degree in history. He received a Juris Doctor degree from the Mississippi College School of Law in 1998. In law school, he was a senator in the law student bar association, a member of Phi Alpha Delta, and a court appointed special advocate.

== Career ==
=== Attorney ===
Wiggins works as an attorney. From 2021 to late 2024, he was a partner at Taggart, Rimes & Wiggins, PLLC, in Pascagoula, and prior to that, managed his own firm from 2011 to 2021.

He served as Assistant District Attorney in Jackson County, Mississippi for seven years prior to becoming a state senator in 2011. Before that, he worked as a youth court prosecutor.

=== Senator ===
Wiggins has served as a Republican member of the Mississippi State Senate since 2012, representing District 52, encompassing southern Jackson County and includes Pascagoula, Gautier, and Ocean Springs. As early as January 2012, he proposed a bill to prevent criminals convicted of manslaughter from being released early. After completing his first term, Wiggins ran unopposed in 2015. Tate Reeves named him Chairman of the first ever Senate Medicaid Committee, overseeing policy for one of the state’s largest budget items. In addition to serving on Appropriations, Education, and other committees, Wiggins serves as Vice-Chairman of the Senate Public Health Committee, one of the largest committees in the Senate. In a rare occurrence as a freshman legislator, Wiggins served as Chairman of the Senate Ports and Marine Resources Committee during his first term.

In his time in the Senate, Wiggins has authored and passed legislation strengthening Mississippi’s child abuse laws, including the “Lonnie Smith Act” which strengthened Mississippi’s child abuse laws, “Katie’s Law” allowing for the collection of DNA after arrest on violent felonies, increasing GPS monitoring of sex offenders, and increasing funding for prosecution of child abuse cases and handling the 2013 Criminal Justice Reform Act which strengthened laws against violent offenders, led to criminal justice reform throughout the state and is projected to save Mississippi taxpayers $210 million in correction costs.

Wiggins has been the lead author of two transformative pieces of legislation, the 2013 Early Learning Collaborative Act which established Mississippi’s first ever early education program. That program currently has 18 locations throughout the state and has transformed Mississippi from having no early childhood education programs to being in the top 5 in the United States.

As Chairman of Ports and Marine Resources and a freshman legislator, Brice secured $10 million for the expansion of the Port of Pascagoula.

In the wake of indictments of key Department of Marine Resources (DMR) officials, Wiggins has also authored and passed into law the DMR Accountability and Transparency Act in the wake of indictments of key DMR officials. Furthering his commitment to good government practices, Wiggins authored and passed, with the help Tate Reeves, legislation opening up the meetings of the state’s community hospitals and requiring them to be more transparent with their activities and documents.

Wiggins currently serves as Chairman of Judiciary A, a committee overseeing all manner of legal issues in the state and served as Chairman of Judiciary B in 2020 overseeing criminal law and criminal justice reform.

== Political positions ==
Wiggins is a leading advocate on education, government transparency, criminal justice reform, criminal prosecution issues and appropriations.

Following the BP Oil Spill, Wiggins fought to ensure federal and state dollars remained on the Gulf Coast. He was a lead Senate negotiator, as well as a lead appropriator, on the law creating the Gulf Coast Restoration Fund to direct hundreds of millions of dollars to the Gulf Coast and currently serves on the Governor’s Gulf Coast Advisory Committee for RESTORE Act funds.

Wiggins fights for several political positions, including:

- Cutting taxes and balancing the budget
- The importance of early education
- Economic recovery and resiliency
- Supporting law enforcement and fighting for impactful criminal justice reform
- Sustainable use of the environment and natural resources
- Promoting transparency and combating corruption
- Election reform
- Protecting the rights of the unborn
- Foreign policy
- Servant leadership
- Withdrawing from Afghanistan
- Supporting economic development
- Defending the Second Amendment
- Promoting public service to young people
- Increasing Mississippi's relevance
- Rightsizing the government and electing stronger congressional leadership
- Fighting the expansion of Obamacare
- Immigration
- Protecting and honoring veterans

== Personal life ==
Wiggins is married with two children. They reside in Pascagoula, Mississippi. He is Methodist.
