= Old Pascagoula High School =

- U.S. National Register of Historic Places
- Mississippi Landmark
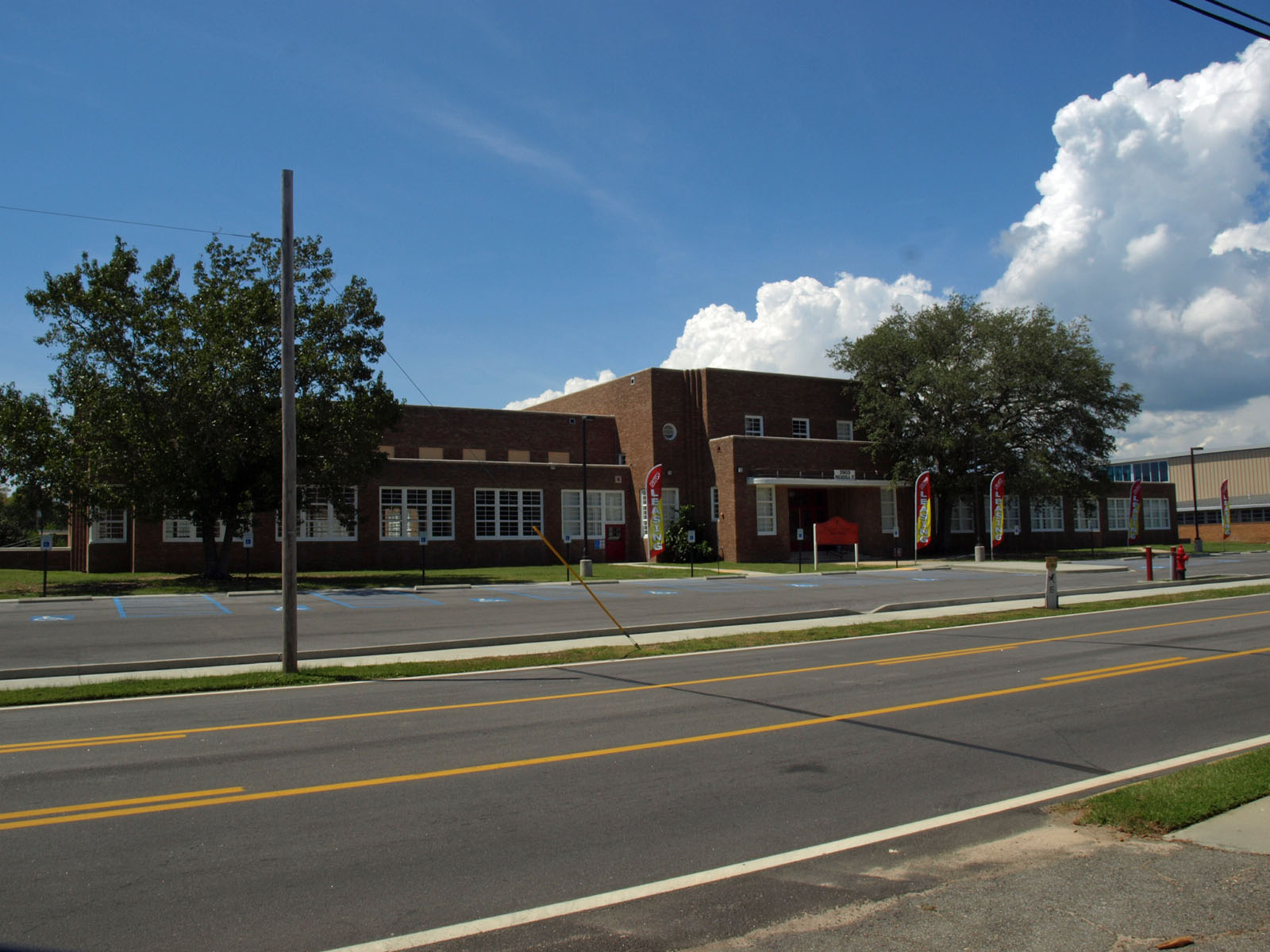
- Old Pascagoula High School in 2012

- Location within Mississippi Location within the United States
- Location: 2903 Pascagoula St., Pascagoula, Mississippi
- Coordinates: 30°21′45″N 88°33′23″W
- Architect: Smith and Olschner; Newton and Schmoll
- Architectural style: Moderne
- NRHP reference No.: 00000330
- USMS No.: 059-PAS-0167.1-NR-ML

Significant dates
- Added to NRHP: April 6, 2000
- Designated USMS: July 15, 1999

The Old Pascagoula High School is a building in Pascagoula, Jackson County, Mississippi. It opened in January 1939 and closed in June 1997.

Designed by the Gulfport architectural firm of Smith & Olschner, the High School was hailed as the "most modern and complete high school unit in the state." Housed within the Art Moderne–style building's 1-foot-thick (0.30 m) walls were; 2 auditoriums, a science laboratory, a large library, a music department, a cafeteria, and business and homemaking classrooms. The school, with a final cost of $150,000, was constructed with funding from the Public Works Administration, a Depression-era federal program that was responsible for thousands of public buildings during the 1930s.

Currently vacant, the City of Pascagoula wished to demolish the building and send it the way of the similarly styled Pascagoula South Elementary school. Residents of Pascagoula fought this action and saved the structure from the wrecking ball.

It was listed on the National Register of Historic Places in 2000.

The Old Pascagoula High School was placed on the 10 most endangered historic places in 2005 by the Mississippi Heritage Trust.

As of 2012, the two larger buildings at the Old Pascagoula High School have been renovated into apartments known as Bayside Village Senior Apartments. The larger auditorium (at seating capacity for 755) within the main building is to be restored and may be used for functions by the nearby new high school.
