= William Dana Orcutt =

American designer, historian and author (1870–1953)

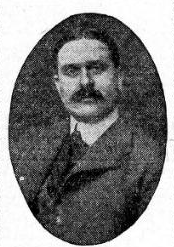
- Portrait of William Dana Orcutt published in the Minneapolis Journal, April 9, 1904
- Born: West Lebanon, New Hampshire
- Died: Boston
- Occupations: Book designer, author

William Dana Orcutt (1870–1953) was an American book designer, typeface designer, historian, and author.

== Biography ==
=== Career ===
William Dana Orcutt was an important book and typeface designer in Boston, an important printing and bookmaking center, in the late nineteenth and early twentieth century. Orcutt graduated from Harvard University in 1892, and subsequently worked for John Wilson, proprietor of The University Press of Cambridge, Massachusetts (a forerunner of the Harvard University Press). Through his role at the University Press, Orcutt made contact with prominent authors such as Mary Baker Eddy, whose books he continued to publish throughout her career. Along with several other important designers and printers such as Daniel Berkeley Updike and Bruce Rogers, Orcutt helped found the Boston Society of Printers in 1905. Orcutt was elected the first president of the Society, an organization inspired by the principles of the Arts and Crafts movement.

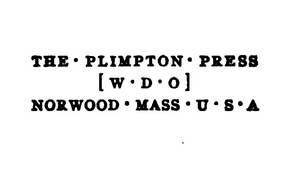
Includes William Dana Orcutt's initials as the book designer for the press

In 1910, Orcutt left the University Press to join The Plimpton Press in Norwood, Massachusetts. During Orcutt's tenure at the press, he worked to change the nature of printing "from a contracting to a manufacturing business", believing that this "rais[ed] the quality of the so-called 'trade' volumes". The Plimpton Press centralized the three divisions of bookmaking - typesetting, printing, and binding. Based on his experience at The University Press and his reputation as a designer and printer, Orcutt was personally sought out by authors to print their works. For example, the Victorian nutritionist and dietician Horace Fletcher bequeathed Orcutt his library so that Orcutt would publish Fletcher's manuscripts.

Orcutt also published several works of his own on writing, book making and book arts and remained active in professional societies related to printing and typography. A self-described "bookman", Orcutt wrote, reviewed, and translated for a variety of publications based in the Boston area including The Atlantic Monthly, The Christian Science Monitor, and The Boston Globe. In an important review article first published in a special issue of the International Studio magazine and then republished in 1914 in a book-length collection, Orcutt surveyed the recent history of "The Art of the Book in America". He praised work by important designers and printers such as Updike, Rogers, and Theodore Low De Vinne. In Orcutt's account, American printing had reached a pinnacle of excellence during the 1860s but had fallen into decline—technically and artistically—until a revival of interest spurred by the work of William Morris in the 1890s.

=== Personal life ===
Orcutt was an Episcopalian. He lived in Boston and on Cape Cod, and his family was well known in the New England area.

== Typefaces ==
Typefaces designed by Orcutt include Humanistic, which was cast for the University Press in Cambridge, Massachusetts by the American Type Founders Company, French Round Face, and Suburban French.

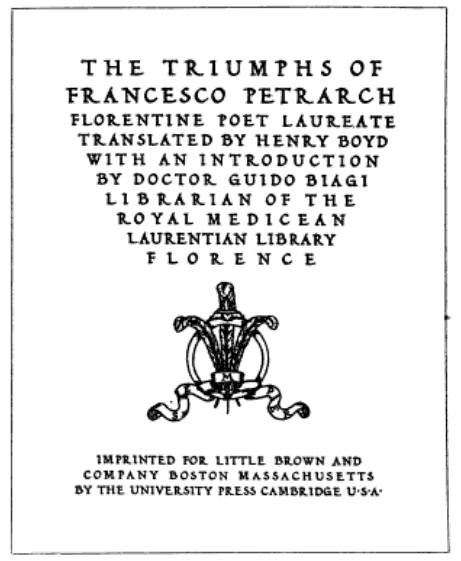
Title page of the Triumphs of Francesco Petrarch set in Humanistic typeface

The Humanistic typeface was probably Orcutt's most important creation. The typeface is based on a 15th-century manuscript of the Aeneid attributed to the notable Humanistic scribe Antonio Sinibaldi held at the Laurentian Library in Florence. Orcutt traveled to Italy to study typographic history and developed a friendship with Guido Biagi, Director of the Laurentian Library, who directed his interest to Renaissance Italian lettering. A special limited printing of a book on Petrarch, titled The triumphs of Francesco Petrarch, Florentine poet laureate, published in 1906, served as the occasion to commission and create this typeface. Charles Eliot Norton, Professor of Art History at Harvard and expert on Italian art and literature, reviewed designs of the typeface and later praised "the attractive freedom and unusual grace in its lines, derived immediately from the manuscript model but adapted to the necessary rigid requirements of print".

The Triumphs was a painstaking work of historical reconstruction and fine typesetting, including ink prepared exactly according to the methods of 15th-century Italian scribes. Orcutt reflected on the process of creating this typeface in his 1926 work In quest of the perfect book. Orcutt's Humanistic was adapted by the British foundry Stephenson Blake as Bologna in 1946, which in turn became American Type Founders' Verona (with lining figures) in 1951.

== Books (partial list) ==
Orcutt authored books in a variety of genres ranging from novels to historical fiction, biography, and writing advice.

- The Writer's Desk Book: Being a Reference Volume Upon Questions of ... Frederick A. StokesCompany. 1912.
- Burrows of Michigan and the Republican Party: A Biography and a History. Longmans, Green and Co. 1917.
- The manual of linotype typography, prepared to aid users and producers of printing in securing greater unity and real beauty in the printed page;. Brooklyn, N.Y.: Mergenthaler linotype Co. 1923.
- In quest of the perfect book : reminiscences & reflections of a bookman. Boston: Little Brown & Co. 1926.
- The Kingdom of Books. Boston: Little Brown & Co. 1927.
- The magic of the book; more reminiscences and adventures of a bookman. Boston: Little, Brown & Co. 1930.
- Celebrities off parade; pen-and-ink portrait sketches. New York & Chicago: Willett, Clark and Co. 1935.
- From my library walls; a kaleidoscope of memories. New York; Toronto: Longmans, Green and Co., inc. 1945.
- Mary Baker Eddy and her books. Boston: Christian Science Pub. Society. 1950.
