= James Wiggins =

James or Jim Wiggins may refer to:

- James Wiggins (American football), American football player
- James Russell Wiggins (1903–2000), American editor and ambassador
- James "Boodle It" Wiggins, American blues singer and musician
- Jim Wiggins (actor) (1922–1999), English TV actor
- James Wiggin Coe (1909–c. 1946), American naval officer
