= William Dawes Miller =

American engineer (c. 1918 – 1993)

William Dawes Miller (c. 1918 – April 9, 1993) was an American engineer. He was also a director of the Pioneer Fund and President of the Metropolitan Club in Manhattan.

He graduated from Carnegie Institute of Technology. Miller was an engineer and operations officer at Oak Ridge National Laboratory for the United States Atomic Energy Commission (Manhattan Project). Later he was chief engineer at Continental Copper & Steel on the Texas Towers radar project. He went on to be President and CEO of Consolidated Aluminum, and later a senior vice president at The Anaconda Company.

He died of a heart attack in Palm Beach, Florida.
