= Albert H. Wiggin =

American banker

Albert Henry Wiggin
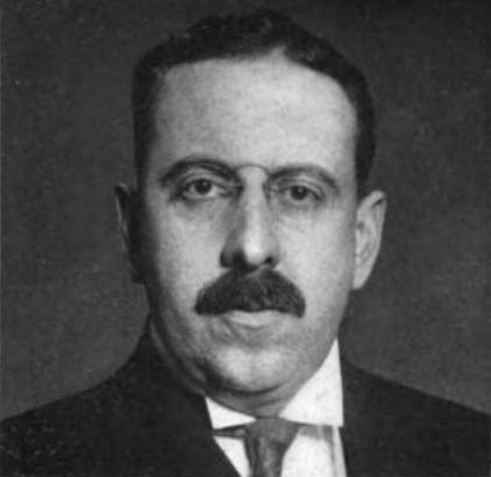
- Wiggin circa 1913
- Born: February 21, 1868; Medfield, Massachusetts, U.S.
- Died: May 21, 1951 (aged 83); Greenwich, Connecticut, U.S.

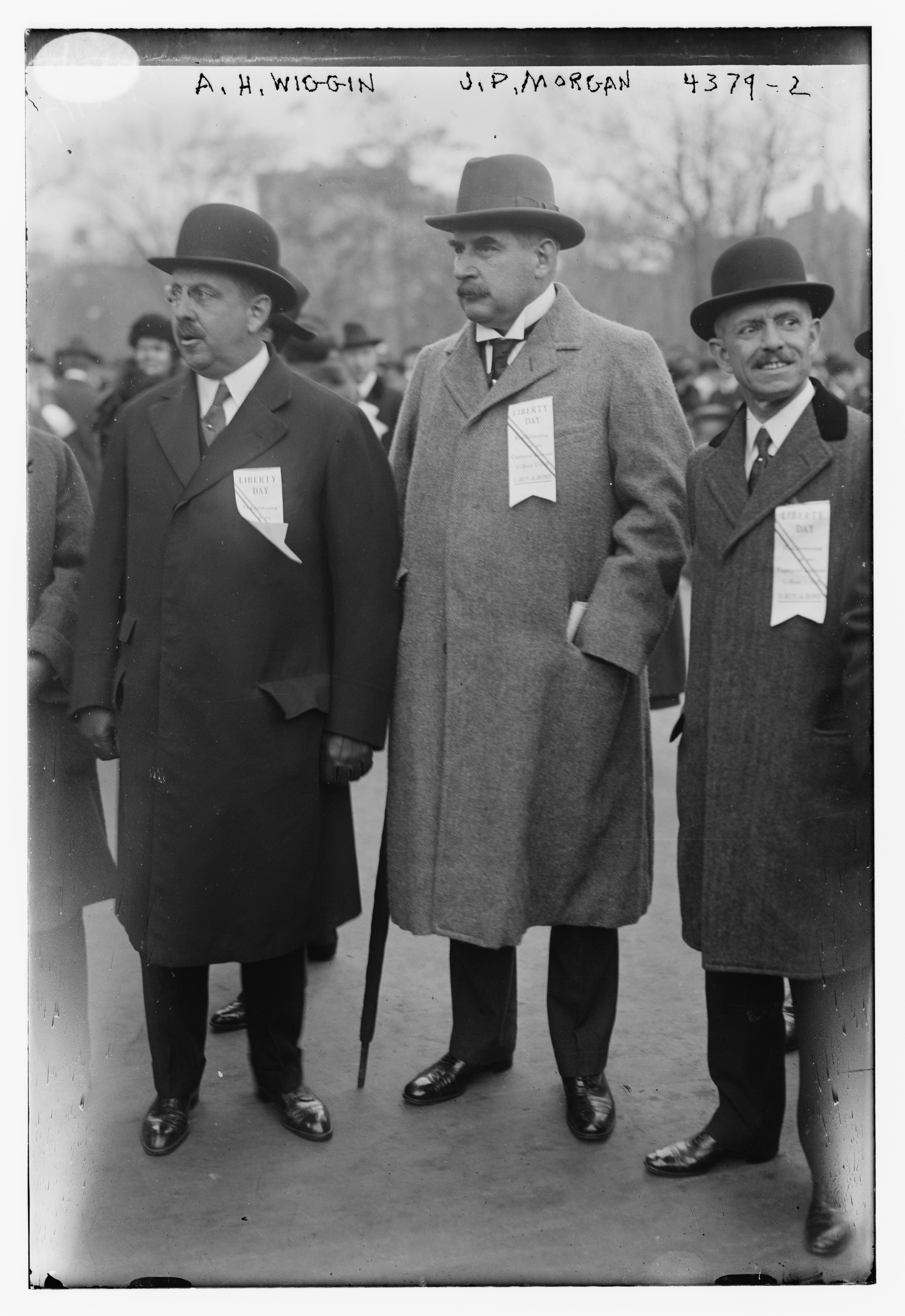
Wiggin and J.P. Morgan, Jr. in 1917 in Manhattan at a war bond parade

Albert Henry Wiggin (February 21, 1868 – May 21, 1951) was an American banker. General Electric's Owen D. Young once described him as "the most colorful and attractive figure in the commercial banking world" of his time. Wiggin was a Director of the Federal Reserve Bank of New York 1932–33. Wiggin was also the only member of the Federal Reserve Bank to have a law written precisely against his actions, the "Wiggin Provision", when Albert was forced to "resign in disgrace after it was revealed that he had been short-selling his own bank’s stock"

== Biography ==
Born in the town of Medfield, Massachusetts, Albert Wiggin was the son of a Unitarian minister, James Henry Wiggin, and Laura Newton. He had a brother, Langley Wiggin.

Wiggin graduated from English High School of Boston in 1885 and went on to work for .B Moors & Company as a runner. Eight months later, he worked as a bookkeeper for another Boston bank run by his uncle called the National Bank of the Commonwealth. At the age of twenty-three, he worked his way up towards an assistant for a national bank examiner in Boston. In 1892 he married Jessie Duncan Hayden with whom he had two daughters. In 1894 he became the assistant cashier of the Third National Bank of Boston.

Beginning in 1911, he started assembling a collection of art prints, drawings, watercolors, and books. Among the French, British, and American works of art on paper that Wiggin acquired were prints by Henri Fantin-Latour, Francisco Goya, Honoré Daumier, George Bellows, Henri de Toulouse-Lautrec, Thomas Rowlandson, Jean-Louis Forain, Alphonse Legros, and many others. In 1941 he donated his collection of several thousand pieces to the Boston Public Library. Other works from his assemblage can be found at the New York Public Library and the Baltimore Museum of Art. He was made a lifetime member of the board of MIT's Charles Hayden Memorial Library.

For Middlebury College in Middlebury, Vermont, he endowed the Albert Henry Wiggin Memorial Scholarship Fund plus he and his wife formed the Albert H. and Jessie D. Wiggin Foundation which gave grants to institutions such as the United Hospital Fund and the Department of Medicine at Columbia University. In 1939, he and his wife donated $250,000 to acquire land and build the Boys Club of Greenwich.

=== Banking career ===
Wiggin went to New York in June 1899 to become vice president of the prestigious National Park Bank. He also was vice president of two small Manhattan institutions, the Mutual Bank and the Mount Morris Bank. By his early thirties, Wiggin was already a vice president at National Park Bank in New York City. He gained recognition as one of the up-and-coming in the Wall Street banking community for his role in organizing Bankers Trust. In 1904 the quiet, reserved Wiggin became the youngest ever vice president at the prestigious Chase National Bank and in 1911 succeeded Henry W. Cannon as president.

Wiggin had an integral role in creating commercial and industrial accounts that ultimately gained Chase's revenue. He also invited other important businessmen from other big companies to see if they wanted to become Chase directors. Chase's deposits had an immediate effect as they soared from $91 million at the end of 1910 to $2.074 billion twenty years later. Capital and surplus soon followed by increasing from $13 million to $358 million. The amount of Shareholders Chase had gone from twenty in 1904; to 2,189 in 1921; to 50,510 in 1929, and even reached 89,000 by 1933.

Under Albert Wiggin, Chase National Bank entered a period of rapid growth, spurred by the acquisition of several New York financial institutions and the creation of a securities division that made his bank second only to National City Bank. In 1917, Wiggin was made Chairman of the bank and served on the board of directors of more than fifty major American corporations. He was responsible for bringing in members of the Rockefeller family as investors in Chase National Bank. By 1918, Wiggin made Chase the fourth largest bank in the United States.

Wiggin became an important player on the world financial stage and in 1923 opened a Chase National Bank representative office in London, England which began lending directly to governments and businesses throughout Europe. Wiggin also developed other foreign banking corporations in places such as Paris, Rome, Panama City and Berlin. Wiggin was a staunch proponent of free trade, albeit under certain restrictions. He was a signatory to the 1926 international round robin declaration by over 100 of the world's most powerful financiers that called upon European nations to remove their tariff barriers to international trade.

=== Great Depression ===
On Black Thursday of the Wall Street crash of 1929, Albert Wiggin joined with other senior Wall Street bankers in an attempt to save the collapsing stock market. On behalf of Chase National Bank, Wiggin, along with other bankers, committed substantial funds for an investment pool. They had Richard Whitney, vice president of the New York Stock Exchange, go onto the floor of the Exchange and with great fanfare purchase large blocks of shares in major U.S. corporations at prices above the current market. The action halted the slide that day and returned stability to the market. While the market slide continued on Monday, Wiggin was lauded as a hero for his actions.

However, what later came out in the Pecora Commission investigation into the Wall Street crash was that, beginning in September 1929, Wiggin had begun selling short his personal shares in Chase National Bank at the same time he was committing his bank's money to buying. He shorted over 42,000 shares, earning him over $4 million. His earnings, moreover, were tax-free, since he used a Canadian shell company to buy the stocks. Wiggin was not alone; other executives in powerful positions had done the same thing. The committee counsel, Ferdinand Pecora, said of Wiggins, "In the entire investigation, it is doubtful if there was another instance of a corporate executive who so thoroughly and successfully used his official and fiduciary position for private profit" (Pecora, p. 161). As a result of all the controversy, the "Wiggin Provision" was promptly named after him which prevented company directors from selling short on their own stocks and making a profit from their own company's demise.

As head of one of America's most important banks, Wiggin was consulted by the Hoover Administration for suggestions on how to deal with the Great Depression. Wiggin opposed the Smoot-Hawley Tariff Act of 1930 and according to the Ludwig von Mises Institute, "One of the best counsels on the depression was set forth in an annual report by Albert H. Wiggin, chairman of the board of the Chase National Bank, in January 1931." In 1949 Wiggin sold his 24 percent interest in American Express, stipulating that it would not be broken up or wind up owned by Chase. Although Wiggin never did anything illegal, he eventually retired under pressure from the bank after 30 plus years of successful banking.

Albert Wiggin died on May 21, 1951, at the age of 83, at his summer home, Field Point Park in Greenwich, Connecticut, after a prolonged illness.

Business positions
Preceded by A. Barton Hepburn	Chase CEO; 1917–1930	Succeeded by Winthrop W. Aldrich
