= Delafield =

== Places in the United States ==
- Delafield, Illinois, an unincorporated community
- Delafield, Wisconsin, a city
- Delafield (town), Wisconsin
- Delafield Township, Jackson County, Minnesota

== People ==
- E. M. Delafield (1890–1943), British writer of the 1930s and 1940s
- Edward Delafield (1794–1875), American physician, father of Francis Delafield and brother to Richard Delafield
- Edward Coleman Delafield (1878–1976), American banker and soldier, president of the Bank of America
- Edward Henry Delafield (1880–1955), American politician and landowner
- Francis Delafield (1841–1915), American physician
- Joseph Delafield (1790–1875), American officer in the War of 1812, lawyer and diplomat
- Richard Delafield (1798–1873), Union Army major general during the American Civil War
- Rufus King Delafield (1802–1874), American banker and manufacturer
- Violetta White Delafield (1875–1949), American botanist, mycologist, scientific illustrator and horticulturist

== See also ==
- R. F. Delderfield (1912–1972), English novelist and dramatist
