= Mary Ann Delafield DuBois =

American sculptor and philanthropist (1813–188)

- Born: Mary Ann Delafield; November 6, 1813; London, England
- Died: October 27, 1888 (aged 74)
- Education: Litchfield Female Academy
- Spouse: Cornelius DuBois (m. 1832; died 1882)
- Children: 10
- Relatives: Eugene Floyd DuBois (grandson)

Mary Ann Delafield DuBois (November 6, 1813 – October 27, 1888) was an American sculptor and philanthropist. In 1854 she was co-founder of New York Nursery and Child's Hospital, and was the hospital's director.

== Early life ==
Mary Ann Delafield was born in London on November 6, 1813. She was the daughter of an English mother, Mary (née Roberts) Delafield, and American father, John Delafield (1786–1853), a banker who was in England during the War of 1812. After her mother died in 1819, Mary Ann moved to New York City, where her father remarried to Harriet Wadsworth Tallmadge (1797–1856), a daughter of U.S. Representative Benjamin Tallmadge. Among her younger half-siblings were Tallmadge Delafield and Mary Floyd Delafield.

Among her extended family were uncles Dr. Edward Delafield, Civil War Gen. Richard Delafield, lawyer Joseph Delafield, and banker Rufus King Delafield. Her first cousin was Dr. Francis Delafield, who was the father of Edward Henry Delafield, a Connecticut politician.

She attended the Litchfield Female Academy in 1825.

== Career ==
During the Panic of 1837, DuBois persuaded her father-in-law to open an empty warehouse to accommodate men left homeless by the economic downturn. In 1854 she and a doctor's wife, Anna R. Emmet, founded the Nursery and Child's Hospital, which focused on the needs of poor women and their small children. The hospital fostered foundlings, offered daycare and wet nurses for the babies of working women, and was the first hospital in New York City to admit infants under two years of age. DuBois and Emmet ran the hospital with personal funds and energetic fundraising among her friends and in the wider community, including charity balls, until she successfully lobbied the New York state legislature for support. Her uncle, Edward Delafield, was the first president of the hospital's medical board, and a consulting physician there. She was an active hospital director; in 1870, DuBois fired pediatrician Abraham Jacobi from the hospital, when he published a letter critical of the hospital's policies. DuBois's hospital eventually merged with larger medical programs, and is now considered part of the New York Presbyterian Hospital/Weill Cornell Medical Center.

Despite the demands of her philanthropic efforts, a large household, and health issues (or perhaps because of her otherwise demanding life), DuBois pursued sculpture as a serious amateur. She was a member of the Brooklyn Art Association. She made miniature cameos, sometimes taught art classes, and was elected to the National Academy of Design. She was a friend of sculptor Edward Augustus Brackett.

== Personal life ==
In 1832, Mary Ann Delafield was married to Cornelius DuBois (1810–1882), a lawyer and tobacco merchant. Together, they had ten children, born between 1833 and 1852; four of whom died in infancy.

Her husband died in 1882, and Mary Ann died roughly six years later in 1888, aged 75 years, of complications related to diabetes. She is interred at the New York Marble Cemetery.

=== Descendants ===
Mary Ann was a grandmother of physiologist Eugene Floyd DuBois (1882–1959). Another grandson, Delafield Dubois, was the husband of author Theodora McCormick Du Bois.
