= Julia Livingston Delafield (1837–1914) =

American philanthropist

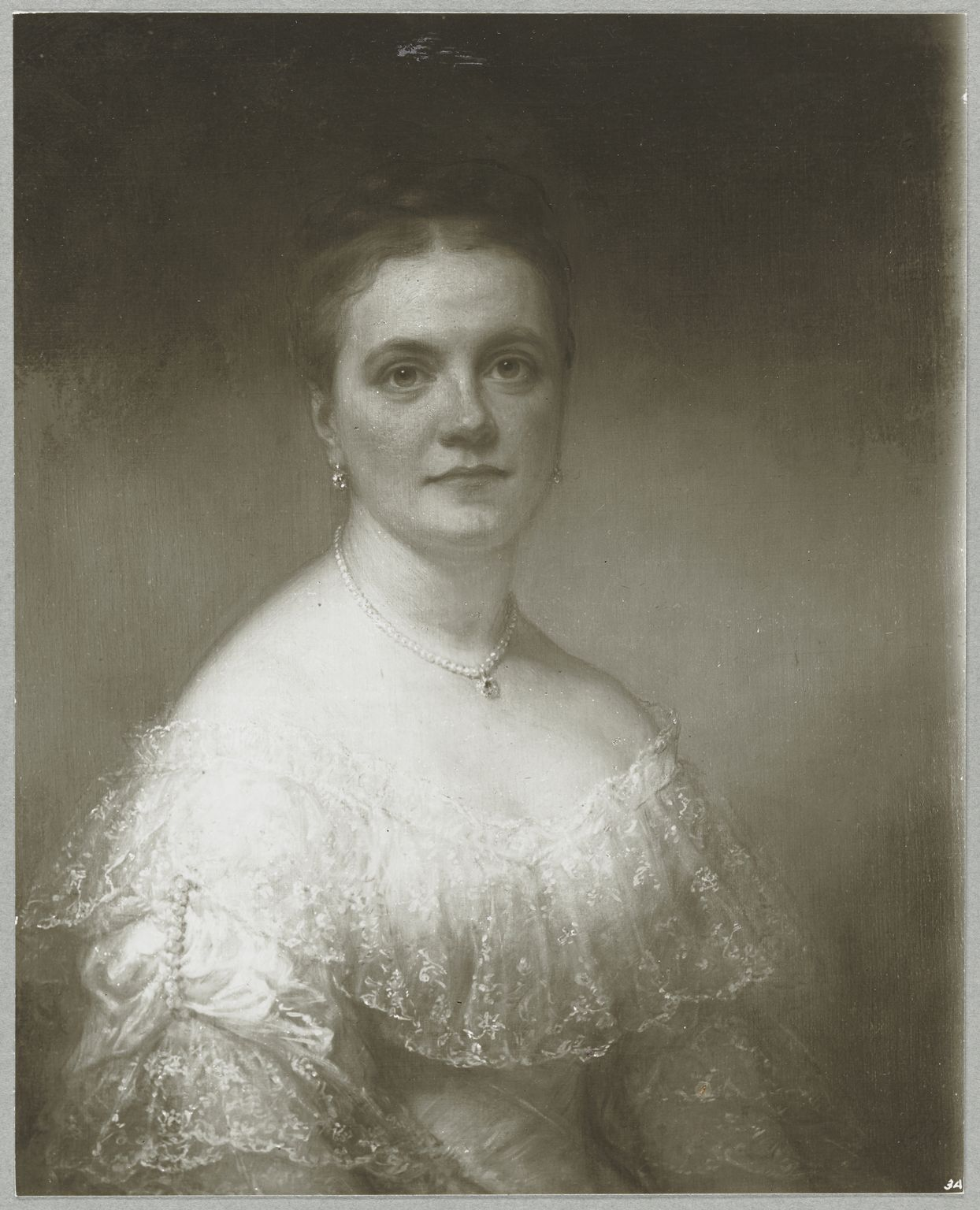
- 1873 portrait of Delafield by Daniel Huntington

Historian for the Colonial Dames of America

Personal details
- Born: September 10, 1837 New York City, New York, U.S.
- Died: November 10, 1914 (aged 77) Fieldston, The Bronx, New York City, New York, U.S.
- Parent(s): Joseph Delafield; Julia Livingston
- Occupation: philanthropist, historian, clubwoman

Julia Livingston Delafield (September 10, 1837 – November 10, 1914) was an American philanthropist, historian, and clubwoman. A relative of the prominent Livingston family, she grew up in high society New York and was active in various charitable causes including the Children's Aid Society. Delafield was a member of the Colonial Dames of America and served as the organization's historian.

== Early life and family ==
Delafield was born on September 10, 1837 in at her grandfather's house, 72 Leonard Street, in Tribeca, Manhattan, New York City to Major Joseph Delafield and Julia Livingston. Through her father, she was a direct descendent of John Delafield, who emigrated to the America from London in 1783 to carry the provisional peace treaty between Britain and the United States. She was also a descendent of Edward I and Margaret of France. Through her mother, a member of the prominent Livingston family, she was a descendant of Francis Lewis, a Founding Father of the United States, and William Livingston, 4th Lord Livingston. Her maternal grandfather, Maturin Livingston, was the Recorder of New York City and her maternal grandmother, Margaret Lewis, was the daughter of New York Governor Morgan Lewis. Delafield grew up at Fieldston, her family's estate in The Bronx.

== Adult life ==
Delafield was active in charitable causes throughout her life and was particularly devoted to the Pike School of the Children's Aid Society.

She was a member of the Colonial Dames of America. Delafield served as the Historian for the Colonial Dames of America. In 1904, she wrote a history of the founding of the Colonial Dames.

Delafield was painted by portraitist Daniel Huntington in 1873.

== Death ==
She died in 1914 at Fieldston, which was then owned by her brother, Maturin Livingston Delafield.
