= Lud Kramer =

11th Secretary of State of Washington

11th Secretary of State of Washington
- In office January 13, 1965 – January 15, 1975
- Governor: Daniel J. Evans
- Preceded by: Victor A. Meyers
- Succeeded by: Bruce Chapman

Personal details
- Born: Albert Ludlow Kramer III; June 10, 1932 Manhattan, New York, U.S.
- Died: April 9, 2004 (aged 71) Liberty Lake, Washington, U.S.
- Party: Republican
- Relations: Edward C. Delafield (grandfather); Robert L. Gerry III (cousin)
- Children: 4
- Parent(s): Albert Ludlow Kramer Jr. Mary Delafield
- Education: Brooks School

Military service
- Allegiance: United States
- Branch/service: United States Air Force
- Rank: Sergeant

Albert Ludlow "Lud" Kramer III (June 10, 1932 – April 9, 2004) was an American politician who served as a member of the Seattle City Council and as the 11th Secretary of State of Washington.

== Early life ==
Kramer was born in New York City on June 10, 1932, into a prominent and wealthy family. He was the son of Manhattan poloist and yachtsman, Albert Ludlow Kramer Jr. (1907–1971) and Mary (née Delafield) Kramer, who married in June 1931. In 1935, his parents divorced and his father remarried to Melva Peshmalyan Colt (daughter of Byron Peshmalyan and widow of Roswell C. Colt) in December 1939. In April 1940, they also divorced and his father married Brenda Fiske, a daughter of Archibald F. C. Fiske, in 1940. His family had a home in New York City and an estate designed by Peabody, Wilson & Brown in Old Westbury on Long Island known as Picket Farm (demolished after a fire destroyed the home in 1977).

His paternal grandparents were Margaretta Stockton (née Beasley) Delafield and the former president of the Bank of America Edward Coleman Delafield of Riverdale (a grandson of Joseph Delafield and descendant of Margret (née Lewis) Livingston and Maturin Livingston). His paternal grandparents were Anna (née Bement) Kramer and the industrialist, banker and lawyer Albert Ludlow Kramer, who served as vice president of the Equitable Trust Company. After his grandmother's death in 1931, his grandfather married Anna's cousin, Alice (née Bishop), in 1932. Together, Albert and Alice authored many books, including The Life in the Vine, The Unlocked Door, and I Bring You Joy. His paternal aunt, Martha Leighton Kramer, was the wife of Robert Livingston Gerry Jr. and mother of petroleum executive Robert L. Gerry III.

He graduated from Brooks School in Andover, Massachusetts.

== Career ==
After attending the Brooks School, Kramer served in the U.S. Air Force as a Sergeant. In 1955, he moved to Tacoma, Washington, where he worked in the banking industry.

=== Political career ===
In 1961, Kramer moved to Seattle with his family and was elected to the Seattle City Council at the age of 29. In 1964, he became the youngest Secretary of State in Washington State history on the Republican ticket. He served for three terms. His major initiatives dealt with migrant housing, election law reform, lowering the voting age from 21 to 18, and various social justice programs for minorities. In 1969, Kramer chaired the Washington State Commission on the Cause and Prevention of Civil Disorder. The "Kramer Commission" examined issues of racial discrimination in housing and the justice system.

In 1974, Kramer ran to represent the Third District in Southwest Washington in the U.S. House of Representatives, but lost the race to Democrat Don Bonker, whom Kramer beat in the race for Washington Secretary of State in 1972.

=== Later life ===
After his unsuccessful bid for U.S. Congress, Kramer resigned in the middle of his third term as secretary of state in 1975 to create the Ludlow Foundation. The purpose of the Ludlow Foundation was to provide small grants to lower-income people and non-profit organizations.

== Personal life ==
Kramer married his wife Patricia. They were married for 17 years and divorced for 17 years then got remarried. They had two daughters and two sons:

- Mary Kramer, Vice-President of the Ludlow Foundation who married Dr.Kenji Higuchi.
- William "Bill" Kramer, president of the Ludlow Foundation.
- Ann Kramer, who married David Vey, Treasurer of the Ludlow Foundation.
- John Kramer, Secretary of the Ludlow Foundation.

Kramer died at his home at Liberty Lake, Washington, on April 9, 2004, from lung cancer.

Political offices
Preceded by Vic Meyers	Secretary of State of Washington; 1964–1975	Succeeded by Bruce Chapman
