= Fieldston =

Fieldston may refer to:

- Fieldston, a neighborhood in the Bronx, New York.
- The Ethical Culture Fieldston School, a private school in the Bronx neighborhood.
