= Edward Coleman Delafield =

American banker

- Born: July 10, 1878; Westhampton, New York, U.S.
- Died: April 21, 1976 (aged 97); Sarasota, Florida, U.S.
- Education: Princeton University
- Parent(s): Maturin Livingston Delafield; Mary Coleman Livingston Delafield
- Relatives: Joseph Delafield (grandfather); Lud Kramer (grandson)

Edward Coleman Delafield (July 10, 1878 – April 21, 1976) was an American banker and soldier who served as president of the Bank of America.

== Early life ==
Delafield was born on July 10, 1878, in Westhampton, New York. He was a son of Maturin Livingston Delafield (1836–1917) and Mary Coleman (née Livingston) Delafield (1847–1922). Among his siblings were Maturin Livingston Delafield Jr., Joseph Livingston Delafield, John Ross Delafield) (husband of Violetta White Delafield), Julia Livingston (née Delafield) Longfellow, Mary Livingston (née Delafield) Finch, Harriet Coleman (née Delafield) Carter, and Eugene Livingston Delafield.

His paternal grandparents were Maj. Joseph Delafield and Julia (née Livingston) Delafield. Her maternal grandparents were Eugene Augustus Livingston and Harriet (née Coleman) Livingston.

Delafield graduated from Princeton University in 1899.

== Career ==
After his graduation from Princeton, Delafield went into banking and in 1914 was made vice president of the Franklin Trust Company, followed by president two years later. In 1920, the institution merged with the Bank of America. In 1930, Bank of America sold the charter for its California affiliate and name to the Bank of Italy, which had merged with the smaller Bank of America, Los Angeles in 1928, under founder Amadeo P. Giannini. In 1931, Delafield's remaining trust company merged with the City Bank Farmers Trust Company.

In 1937, he became a founding senior partner in Delafield & Delafield, the investment counselling and New York Stock Exchange member stock brokerage firm. He turned management over to other family members, but returned in 1968 before officially retiring in 1970.

=== Philanthropy ===
From 1946 to 1968 Delafield was the Treasurer and a member of the board of trustees of Memorial Hospital for the Treatment of Cancer and Allied Diseases later known as the Sloan-Kettering Institute.

In 1965, Delafield donated a 13-acre property in Riverdale, known as Fieldston Hill, to Columbia University, which renamed it the Delafield Botanical Garden at Columbia University. The parcel was part of an original 256 acres (104 ha) estate purchased by his grandfather, Maj. Joseph Delafield, in 1829 and known as "Fieldston" (after a family seat in Ireland), on the Hudson River, between the southern part of Yonkers and the Spuyten Duyvil.

== Personal life ==
Delafield was twice married. In 1900, he married Margaretta Stockton Beasley (1878–1952). At the wedding, his brother, Joseph L. Delafield, was the best man, and ushers were his brother, J. Ross Delafield, his wife's cousin Percy Rivington Pyne II, Alexander M. Hadden, Princeton tennis star Mercer Beasley, III and Robert Southard. She was the niece of Moses Taylor Pyne, a grandson of Moses Taylor and of a family long associated with National City Bank. Before their divorce, Margaretta and Edward were the parents of:

- Maturin Livingston Delafield (1901–1945), a stockbroker who married Mary Pierce Lyon (1901–1986) in 1924. After his death, she married John S. Williams in 1947.
- Margaretta Stocton "Rita" Delafield (1904–1990), who married William Bergh Kip III (1905–1973) in 1926.
- Mary Delafield (1912–1993), who married Albert Ludlow Kramer Jr. (1907–1971) in June 1931. They divorced in 1935.

In 1928, he remarried to Clelia C. Benjamin (1903–1995). Clelia, a college friend of his daughter Margaretta, was the daughter of Baroness Rachele Maria Carolina "Carina" (née de Saint Seigne) Benjamin of Florence and Walter Romeyn Benjamin, publisher of The Collector, a journal of autographs and history. Clelia's sister Mary was married to Harold Gould Henderson, her grandfather was Park Benjamin Sr. and her uncle was Park Benjamin Jr.

Delafield died at his home in Sarasota, Florida on April 21, 1976.

=== Descendants ===
Through his son Maturin, he was a grandfather of Mary Lyon (née Delafield) Hoddick (1931–2005) and Maturin Livingston Delafield (1933–2007).

Through his daughter Mary, he was a grandfather Albert Ludlow Kramer III, the Secretary of State of Washington from 1965 to 1975.
