= Rufus King Delafield =

American banker and manufacturer

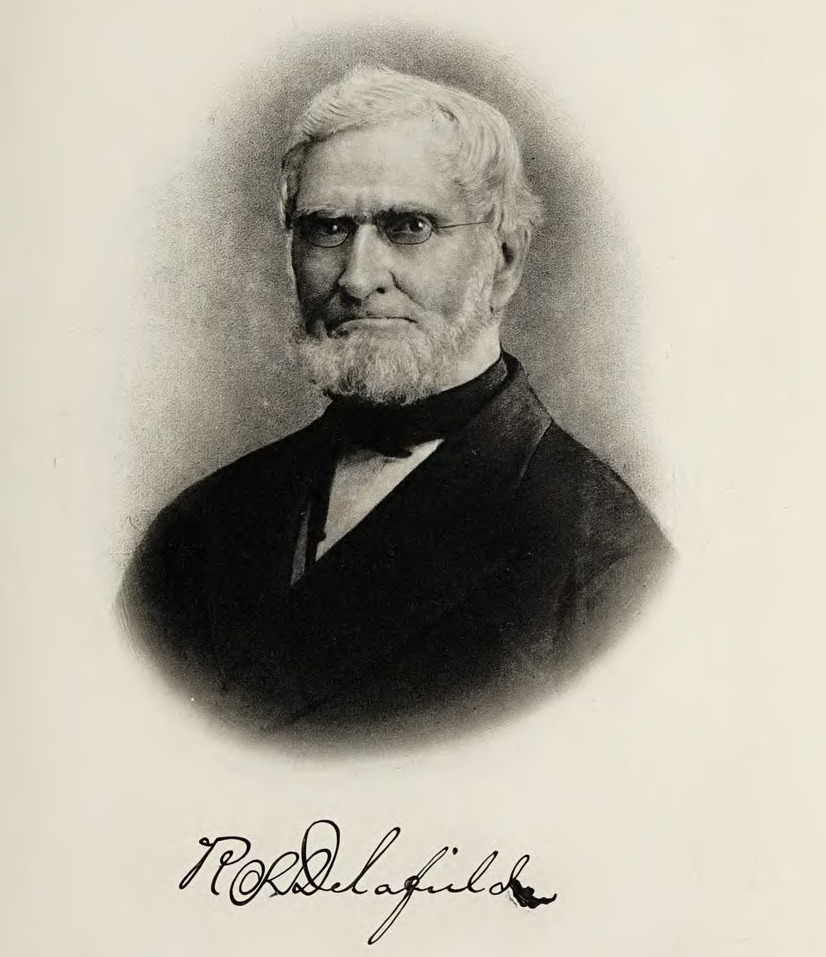
- Born: November 18, 1802; New York City, New York, U.S.
- Died: February 6, 1874 (aged 71); New York City, New York, U.S.
- Resting place: Green-Wood Cemetery
- Spouse: Eliza Bard (m. 1836)
- Children: 7
- Parent(s): Anne Hallett Delafield; John Delafield
- Relatives: Richard Delafield (brother); Edward Delafield (brother); Joseph Delafield (brother); Francis Delafield (nephew)

Rufus King Delafield (November 18, 1802 – February 6, 1874) was an American banker and manufacturer.

== Early life ==
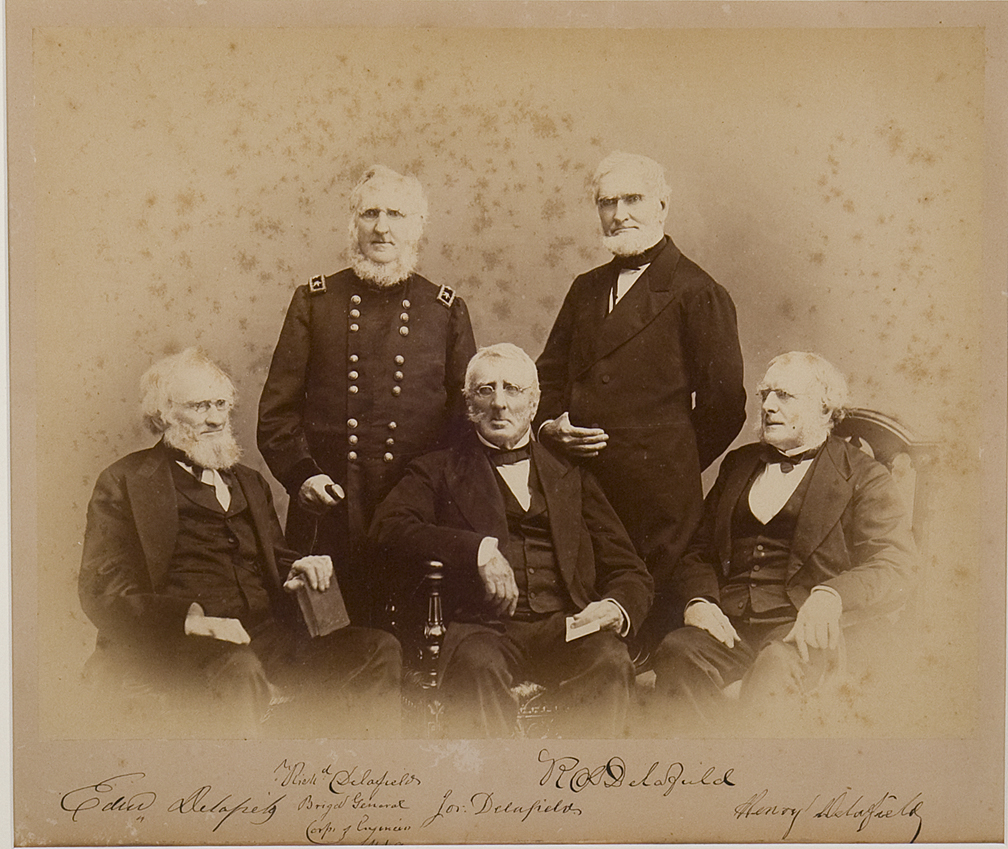
Photograph of members of the Delafield family, c. 1870.

Delafield was born at his father's residence, 16 Wall Street in New York City, on November 18, 1802, and named after Rufus King, the first U.S. Senator from New York who was then serving as the U.S. Minister to the United Kingdom. His godfather was Alexander Hamilton. He was the youngest of nine sons and four daughters born to Anne (née Hallett) Delafield (1766–1839) and John Delafield (1748–1824), a merchant who emigrated to New York from England in 1788 and was a founder and director of the Mutual Insurance Company, becoming one of the wealthiest men in the country. His father's summer residence, built in 1791 on the East River opposite Blackwell's Island, was known as" Sunswick" and was one of the largest and best appointed private houses near New York City. Among his siblings were older brothers John Delafield, (Note: John Delafield (1786–1853) first married Mary Roberts (parents of Mary Ann Delafield DuBois). After her death, he married Harriet Wadsworth Tallmadge (1797–1856), daughter of Delafield's uncle U.S. Representative Benjamin Tallmadge (from his first marriage to Mary Floyd).) Joseph Delafield, (Note: Joseph Delafield (1790–1875) was married to Julia Livingston (1801–1882), daughter of Recorder of New York City Maturin Livingston.) Henry Delafield, (Note: Henry Delafield (1792–1875) was married to Mary Parish Monson (1838–1870), a daughter of Judge L. Monson of Delaware County.) William Delafield, Maj. Gen. Richard Delafield, and Dr. Edward Delafield. His younger sister, Susan Maria Delafield, was married to Henry Parish. Rufus, his father, and his four brothers were painted by Morton H. Bly. The painting is currently owned by the New York Genealogical and Biographical Society.

His maternal grandparents were Joseph Hallett and Elizabeth (née Hazard) Hallett and his aunt, Mary Hallett, was the second wife of U.S. Representative Benjamin Tallmadge. His paternal grandparents were John Delafield and Martha (née Dell) Delafield, a daughter of John Dell of Aylesbury in Buckinghamshire, England. His nephew, Dr. Francis Delafield, was married to Katherine Van Rensselaer, and was the father of Connecticut representative Edward Henry Delafield.

== Career ==
After an education in New York, Delafield engaged in "mercantile business" and served as an officer of the Phenix Bank from 1823 to 1835, and actuary and secretary of the Farmers' Loan and Trust Company (which later became Citibank) from 1835 to 1852. He also served as a trustee of the State Agricultural College of New York.

After his banking career, he was the founder and president of the Delafield & Baxter Hydraulic Cement Company, located at the High Falls at Rondout Creek, which was previously Ogden & Delafield. Delafield & Baxter, which was headquartered at 54 Pine Street, produced Rosendale cement and their mill was driven by water-power and consisted of "three crackers, and four run of four and half feet stone" and three quarries. His son Henry Parish Delafield was the secretary of the firm, and after his death, his eldest son Edward assumed the presidency of Delafield & Baxter.

== Personal life ==
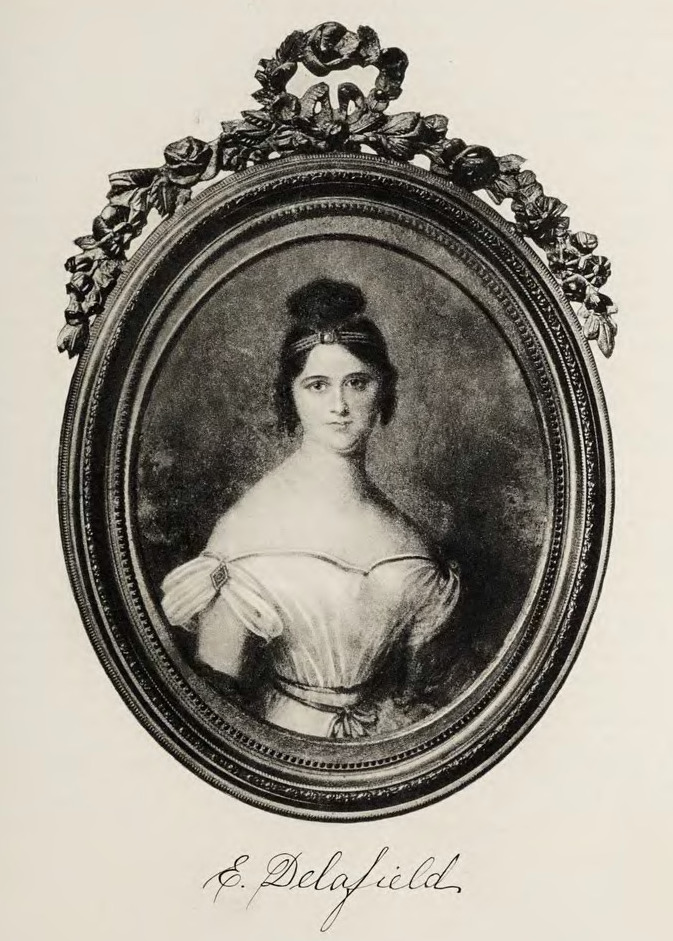
Eliza Bard Delafield

On November 8, 1836, Delafield was married to Eliza Bard (1813–1902) of Hyde Park, New York. Eliza was the daughter of Catherine (née Cruger) Bard and William Bard, founder and first president of the New York Life Insurance and Trust Company. Among her siblings were Anne Bard (wife of Edward Prime), Susan Bard (wife of Ferdinand Sands), and John Bard (founder of Bard College with his wife, Margaret Taylor Johnston, sister of John Taylor Johnston, founder of the Metropolitan Museum of Art). Together, they were the parents of seven children:

- Edward Delafield (1837–1884), a member of the New York Stock Exchange who married Elizabeth Remsen Schuchardt, daughter of Frederick Schuchardt (nephew of Frederick Gebhard), in 1861.
- William Bard Delafield (1838–1863), who died unmarried in Staten Island.
- Rufus King Delafield Jr. (1840–1861), who died unmarried of typhoid fever during the U.S. Civil War.
- Henry Parish Delafield (1842–1904), who married Elizabeth Blake Moran, daughter of Daniel E. Moran, in 1883. He married Marguerite Marie Dewey in 1896.
- Bertram DeNully Delafield (1844–1865), who died unmarried of an "accidental gunshot wound while hunting" in Freeborn, Minnesota.
- Catherine Cruger Delafield (1847–1926), who married John Tonnelé Hall (1831–1895) in 1871. Hall's brother, Valentine Hall Jr., was the maternal grandfather of First Lady Eleanor Roosevelt.
- Richard Delafield (1853–1930), who married widow Clara (née Foster) Carey (1845–1909), sister of Frederic de Peyster Foster and Giraud Foster, in 1879. After her death, he married Edith Pauline Fesser (1872–1925) in 1913. He founded the firm of Delafield & Company, of New York, Chicago, and San Francisco. (Note: Delafield & Company was founded in 1880 as the Delafield, Morgan, Kissel & Co. and primarily traded California and Pacific slope products.)

Like his father and brothers, Delafield established a country seat for himself, Rufus' being in New Brighton, Staten Island, where he brought the residence "to the highest state of cultivation." Today, the former Delafield estate in the Livingston neighborhood, is home to the Staten Island Cricket Club.

Delafield died on February 6, 1874, at 253 Park Avenue in New York City, the residence of his son-in-law, John T. Hall. After a funeral at Trinity Church, he was buried at the family mausoleum at Green-Wood Cemetery in Brooklyn.

=== Descendants ===
Through his eldest son Edward, he was the grandfather of Rufus Delafield (1863–c. 1925), who married Elizabeth Breeze Morse (daughter of Sidney Morse) in 1886; and Massachusetts legislator Frederick Schuchardt Delafield (1865–1935), who married Anne Oakley Brooks (1872–1941) (daughter of Frederick W. Brooks) in 1894.

Through his daughter Catherine, he was the grandfather of Elsie Bard Hall (1873–1932), who did not marry; Suzette Tonnelé Hall (1875–1929), who married Bryce Metcalf in 1905; and Katharine Cruger Delafield Hall (1879–1920), who married W. S. Groesbeck Fowler (grandson of William S. Groesbeck) in 1910.
