= Joseph Delafield =

American soldier, lawyer and diplomat (1790–1875)

Major Joseph Delafield
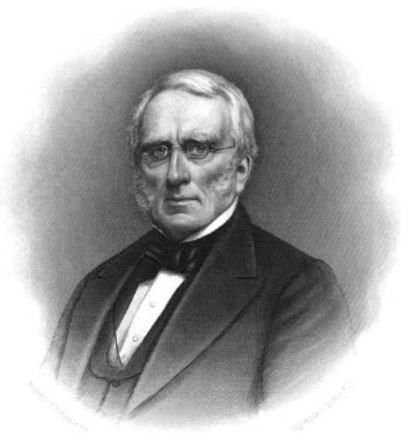
- Born: August 22, 1790; New York City, U.S.
- Died: February 12, 1875 (aged 84); New York City, U.S.
- Resting place: Green-Wood Cemetery
- Education: Yale College
- Spouse: Julia Livingston (m. 1833)
- Children: 4 (including Julia)
- Parent(s): John Delafield; Anne Hallett
- Relatives: Richard Delafield (brother); Edward Delafield (brother); Rufus King Delafield (brother); Francis Delafield (nephew); Edward C. Delafield (grandson)

Joseph Delafield (August 22, 1790 – February 12, 1875) was an American soldier, lawyer and diplomat.

== Early life ==
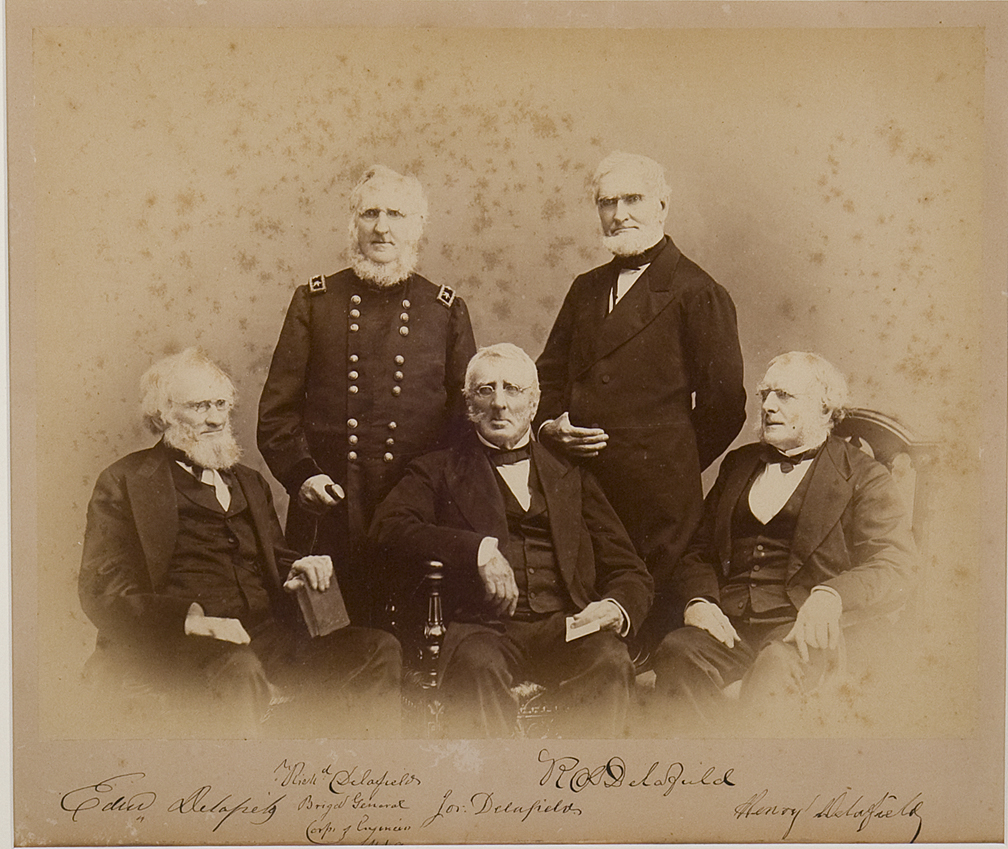
Photograph of members of the Delafield family, c. 1870

Delafield was born in New York City on August 22, 1790. He was the second oldest of the surviving sons and four daughters born to Anne (née Hallett) Delafield (1766–1839) and John Delafield (1748–1824), a merchant who emigrated to New York from England in 1788 and was a founder and director of the Mutual Insurance Company, becoming one of the wealthiest men in the country. His father's summer residence, built in 1791 on the East River opposite Blackwell's Island, was known as" Sunswick" (later known as Ravenswood) and was one of the largest and best appointed private houses around New York. Among his many siblings were brothers John Delafield, (Note: John Delafield (1786–1853) first married Mary Roberts (parents of Mary Ann Delafield DuBois). After her death, he married Harriet Wadsworth Tallmadge (1797–1856), daughter of Delafield's uncle U.S. Representative Benjamin Tallmadge (from his first marriage to Mary Floyd).) Henry Delafield, (Note: Henry Delafield (1792–1875) was married to Mary Parish Monson (1838–1870), a daughter of Judge L. Monson of Delaware County.) William Delafield, Maj. Gen. Richard Delafield, Dr. Edward Delafield, and Rufus King Delafield. (Note: Rufus King Delafield (1802–1874) was married to Eliza Bard (1813–1902), daughter of William Bard and sister of John Bard.) His younger sister, Susan Maria Delafield, was married to Henry Parish. Joseph, his father, and four of his brothers were painted by Morton H. Bly, which is today owned by the New York Genealogical and Biographical Society.

His maternal grandparents were Joseph Hallett and Elizabeth (née Hazard) Hallett and his aunt, Mary Hallett, was the second wife of U.S. Representative Benjamin Tallmadge. His paternal grandparents were John Delafield and Martha (née Dell) Delafield, a daughter of John Dell of Aylesbury in Buckinghamshire, England. His nephew, Dr. Francis Delafield, was married to Katherine Van Rensselaer, and was the father of Connecticut representative Edward Henry Delafield.

After preliminary education from the Rev. Smith on Pine Street in New York, Delafield prepared for college at a school in Stamford, Connecticut, along with Herman LeRoy, William Wilkes and William Backhouse Astor Sr.

== Career ==
After graduating from Yale College in 1808, Delafield studied law with the former Attorney General of New York, Josiah Ogden Hoffman, and was admitted to practice in the Supreme Court of New York on October 29, 1811.

In 1810, he was appointed lieutenant in the 5th regiment, New York State Militia. On February 2, 1812, he was promoted to captain and when the War of 1812 broke out, he raised a full company of volunteers. By the end of 1812, he was commissioned as a captain in Hawkins' Regiment, and promoted to major of the 46th Infantry on April 15, 1814, and resigned at the close of the war.

In 1817, he attached to the commission under the Treaty of Ghent for setting off the northern-western boundary of the United States. On January 1, 1821, he was appointed a full U.S. Agent under the 6th and 7th Articles, serving until June 1828. He was responsible for establishing the line between St. Regis on the St. Lawrence River and the Lake of the Woods.

During his travels north, he began to form his collection of minerals that was considered one of the best in private hands in the country for many years. Delafield was a member of many scientific associations, both in the United States and in Europe. From 1827 to 1866, when he declined a re-election, he served as president of the New York Lyceum of Natural History where he was a member for fifty-two years.

== Personal life ==
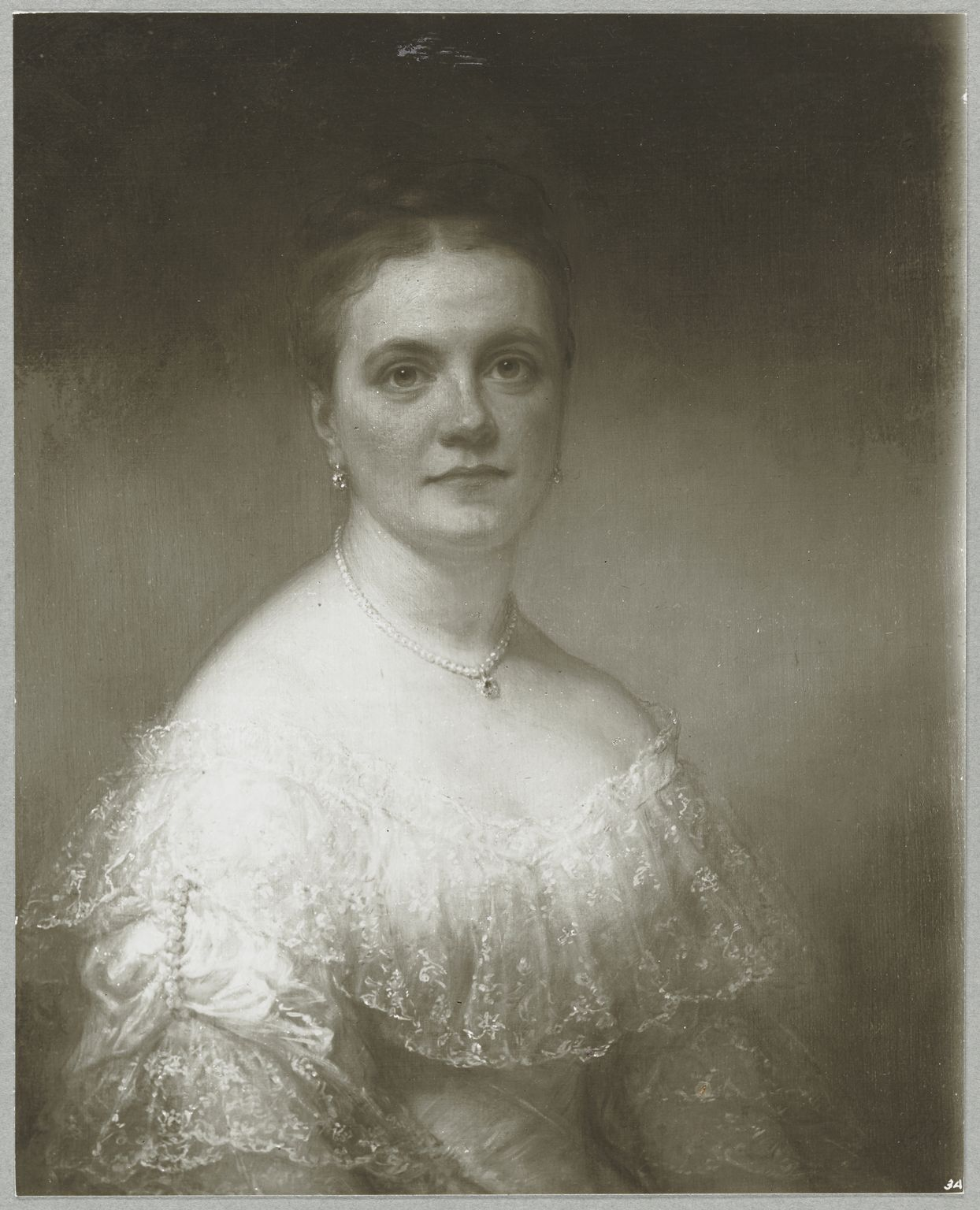
Julia Livingston Delafield, portrait by Daniel Huntington

On December 12, 1833, Delafield was married to Julia Livingston (1801–1882). His wife was a daughter of Margret (née Lewis) Livingston and Maturin Livingston, twice the Recorder of New York City. Her uncle was Speaker Peter R. Livingston and her paternal grandparents were Robert James Livingston and Susanna (née Smith) Livingston (sister of Chief Justice William Smith and daughter of Judge William Smith). Julia's mother was the only daughter and sole heiress of Gov. Morgan Lewis and Gertrude (née Livingston) Lewis. Together, they were the parents of four children:

- Lewis Livingston Delafield (1834–1883), who married Emily Prime (1840–1909), a granddaughter of banker Nathaniel Prime.
- Maturin Livingston Delafield (1836–1917), who married Mary Coleman Livingston (1847–1922), a daughter of Eugene Augustus Livingston.
- Julia Livingston Delafield (1837–1914), who did not marry.
- Joseph Delafield Jr. (1839–1848), who died young.

In 1829, he purchased around 256 acres (104 ha) of land to build a country seat, known as "Fieldston" (after a family seat in Ireland), on the Hudson River, between the southern part of Yonkers and the Spuyten Duyvil, where he built a lime kiln in 1830, providing him with a large income for several years. In 1965, Delafield's grandson, Edward Coleman Delafield, donated the remaining 13-acre remnant in Riverdale, known as Fieldston Hill, to Columbia University, which renamed it the Delafield Botanical Garden at Columbia University.

Delafield died of acute pneumonia on February 12, 1875, at 475 Fifth Avenue, his home in New York City.

=== Descendants ===
Through his son Lewis, he was the grandfather of Lewis Livingston Delafield Jr. (1863–1944), Robert Hare Delafield (1864–1906), and Frederick Prime Delafield (1868–1924).

Through his son Maturin, he was the grandfather of Maturin Livingston Delafield Jr. (1869–1929), Joseph Livingston Delafield (1871–1922), John Ross Delafield (1874–1964) (husband of Violetta White Delafield), Julia Livingston (née Delafield) Longfellow (1875–1963), Edward Coleman Delafield (1877–1976), Mary Livingston (née Delafield) Finch (1878–1961), Harriet Coleman (née Delafield) Carter (1880–1953), and Eugene Livingston Delafield (1882–1930).
