= New York Infant Asylum =

Orphanage in New York City, US (1865–1910)

The New York Infant Asylum was a New York City institution that provided care for abandoned children and obstetrical services for unwed or indigent mothers from 1865 to 1910.

== History ==
=== Establishment and mission ===
The New York Infant Asylum was established in 1865 and initially located at 106th Street in New York City. The asylum was created to care for foundlings and abandoned children, providing them with shelter and basic needs. In 1871, the asylum expanded its mission to include a lying-in department and childcare training for mothers and moved to 24 Clinton Place.

=== Services and objectives ===
The primary objective of the New York Infant Asylum was to provide a safe and nurturing environment for unwanted children until they could be placed in homes. Additionally, the asylum offered obstetrical care to unwed or indigent women, emphasising the importance of both mother and child care. The asylum's policies allowed unwed mothers to receive care during their first pregnancy but not for subsequent pregnancies, reflecting the moral standards of the time.

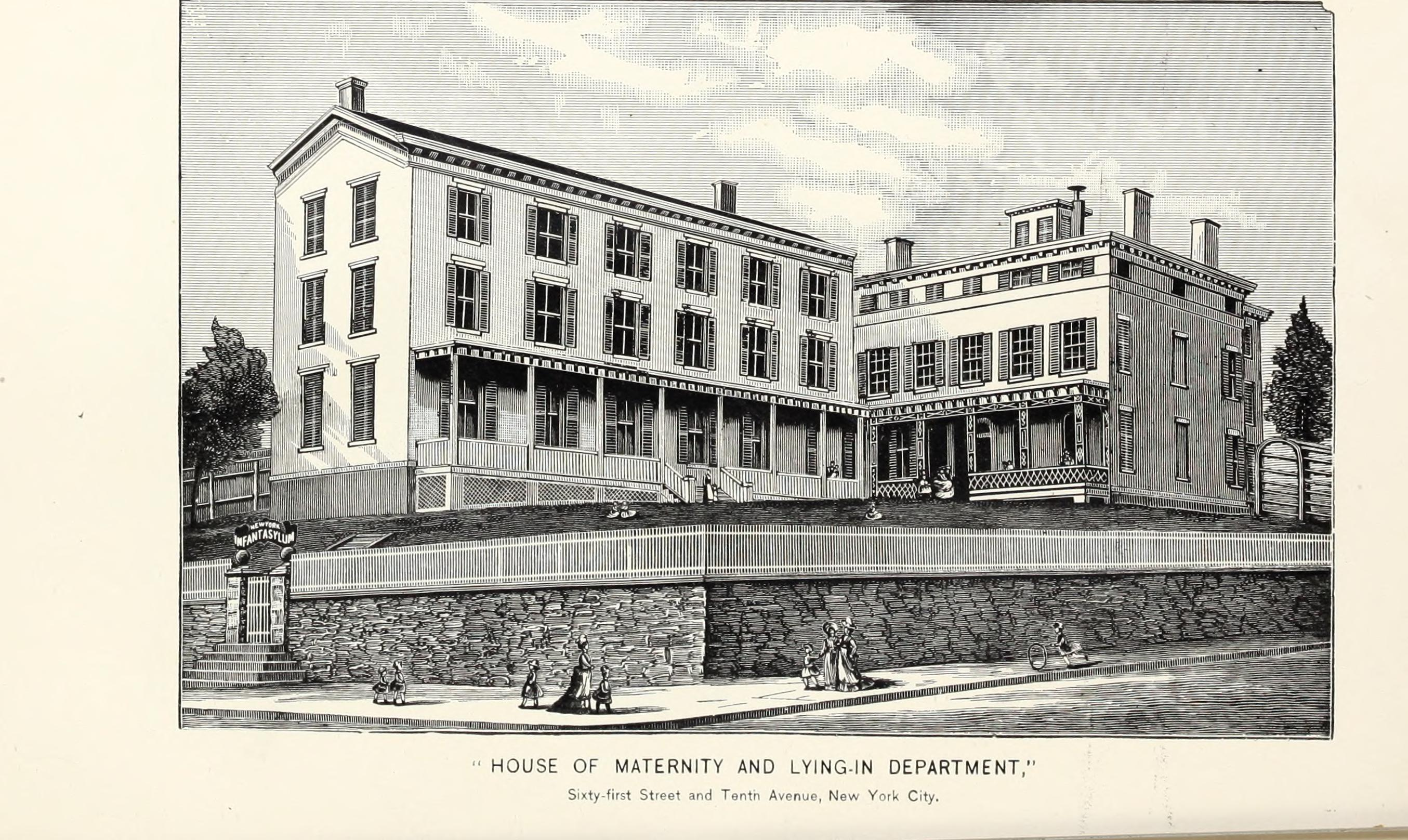
Facility at 61st St and 10th (Amsterdam) Ave

=== Expansion and locations ===
By 1873, the asylum had relocated most of its operations to a larger facility at 61st Street and Amsterdam Avenue. A House of Reception remained downtown until at least 1900. The asylum also opened its first country branch in Flushing in 1872, which operated until 1881, followed by a second branch in Mount Vernon in 1878.

In 1897, there were approximately 200 children living at the Mount Vernon branch.

=== Mergers and evolution ===
In 1899, the New York Asylum for Lying-In Women merged into the New York Infant Asylum's lying-in department. This consolidation aimed to streamline and enhance the obstetrical services provided. In 1900, the institution purchased the building at 139 Second Ave previously occupied by the Old Marlon Street Maternity Hospital.

In 1910, the New York Infant Asylum combined with the Nursery and Child's Hospital to form the New York Nursery and Child's Hospital. This institution eventually became part of the New York-Hospital-Cornell Medical Center in 1934, now known as NewYork-Presbyterian Hospital/Weill Cornell Medical Center.

== Impact and significance ==
The New York Infant Asylum played a crucial role in addressing the needs of abandoned and illegitimate children, as well as providing vital medical care to unwed mothers during a period when such support was scarce. Its evolution and mergers reflect the changing landscape of child and maternal care in New York City.
