= New York Nursery and Child's Hospital =

Hospital in Manhattan, US, 1854–1934

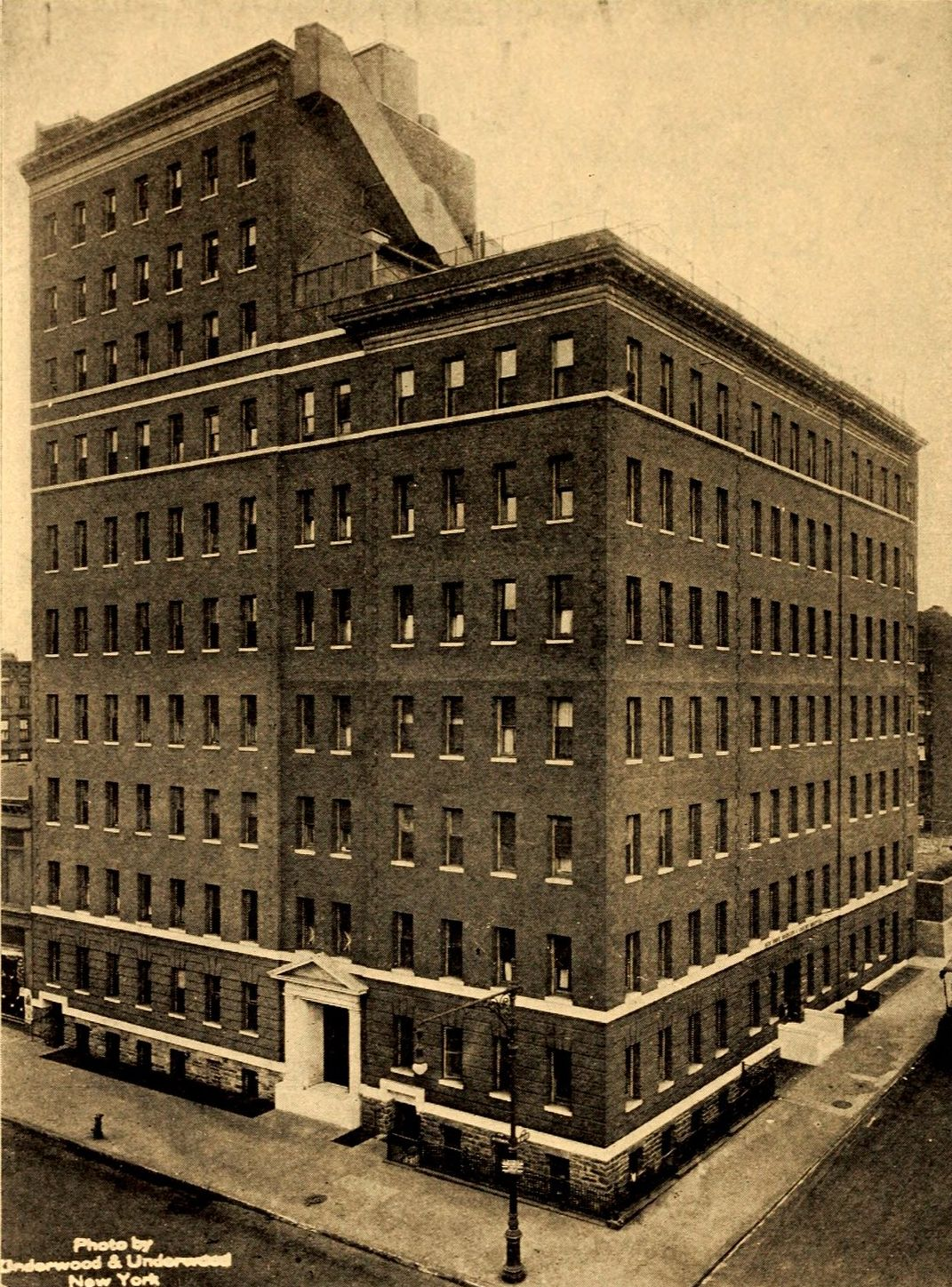
- Main building at West 61st Street and Amsterdam Avenue, circa 1924.

Geography
- Location: New York City, New York, United States

History
- Former names: The Nursery for the Children of Poor Women; Nursery and Child's Hospital
- Constructed
- Opened: 1854 (172 years ago)
- Closed: 1934 (92 years ago)
- Demolished

Links
- Lists: Hospitals in New York State

New York Nursery and Child's Hospital was an obstetrics and pediatrics hospital founded on May 2, 1854, by Mary Ann Delafield DuBois and Ana R. Emmit in New York City, United States.

Initially, the hospital served as a foundling home and provided care for New York's working women and their children. It was a pioneer in treating infants under the age of two.

== History ==
Forerunners to the hospital included the Marion Street Maternity Hospital, which was organized in 1823 and then incorporated in 1827 as "The New York Female Asylum for Lying-In Women". Its stated mission was:

To furnish comfortable conditions and skillful attendance to respectable married women who require an asylum during the period of their confinement, and also to supply competent medical care to deserving married women at their homes under similar circumstances.

In 1854, a hospital was founded under the name The Nursery for the Children of Poor Women by DuBois and Emmit. It provided care for the children of wet nurses while they were at work. Later, its scope was broadened and it became known as the Nursery and Child's Hospital. DuBois served as its director for more than thirty years.

In 1899, the New York Infant Asylum consolidated with the Marion Street Maternity Hospital. Those combined institutions were then joined with the Nursery and Child's Hospital to become the New York Nursery and Child's Hospital in 1910. According to an annual report, its work consisted of:

1. A Lying-in Hospital;
2. A Hospital for sick children;
3. A Boarding-out Department, supplanting the nursery in the Building. The foundling children are placed in suitable homes and their general welfare supervised by visitors from the hospital;
4. An Outside Obstetrical Department, continuing the work begun by the Old Marion Street Maternity Hospital. Physicians connected with the staff are sent to the homes of those who apply for aid;
5. The training of nursery maids, who, after a systematic course in the care of young children, are open to employment in private families.
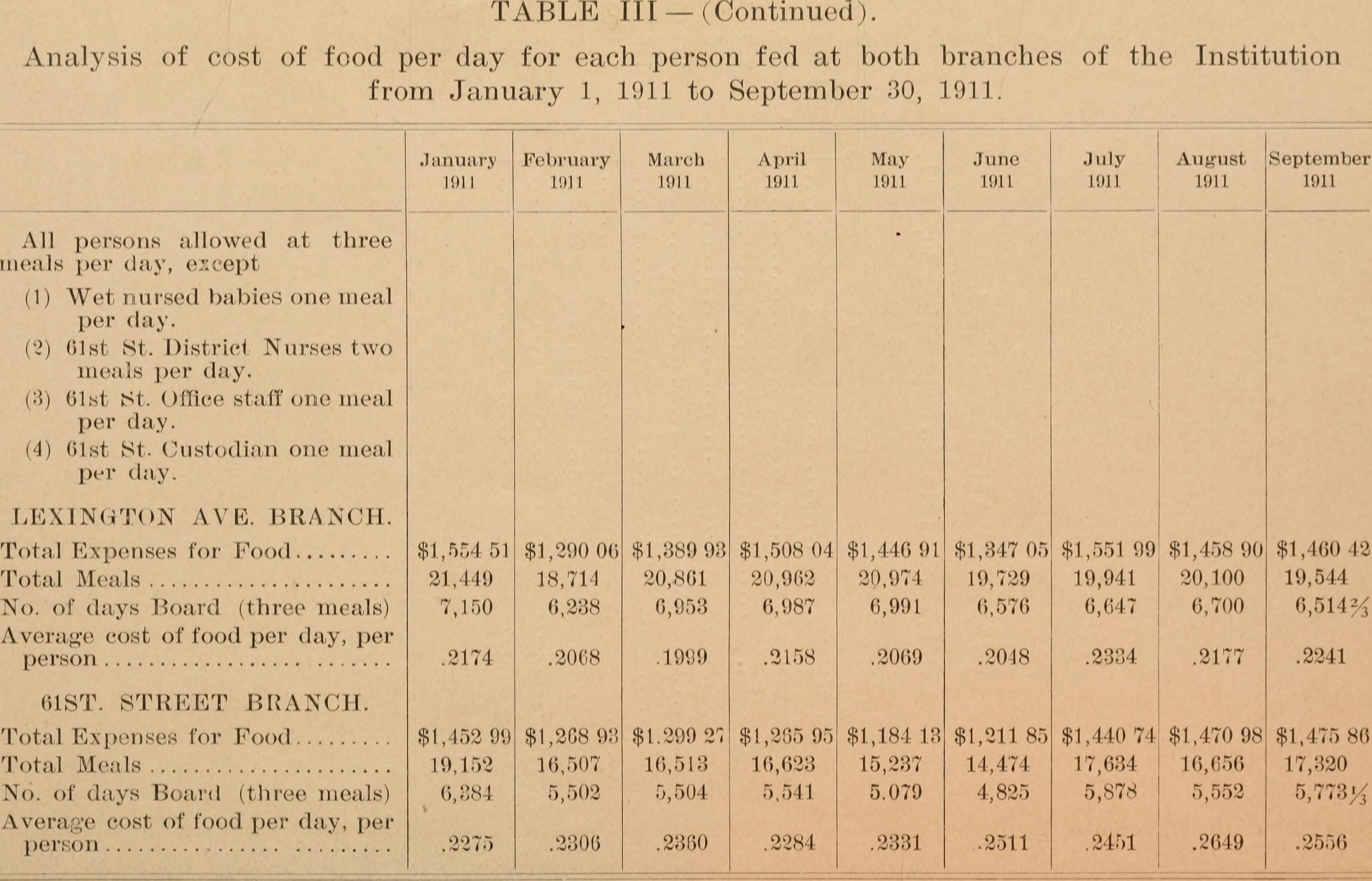
Table from the hospital's Annual Report (1910) showing cost per day to feed its staff.

During the 1930s, the hospital was in financial trouble and on November 21, 1934, it was absorbed by the New York Hospital-Cornell Medical Center. Its specialty departments were discontinued and their services were taken on by other New York City institutions. The hospital's foster home became the New York Child's Foster Home Service.

== See also ==
- List of children's hospitals
- List of hospitals in Manhattan
