= John Kearny Rodgers =

American surgeon

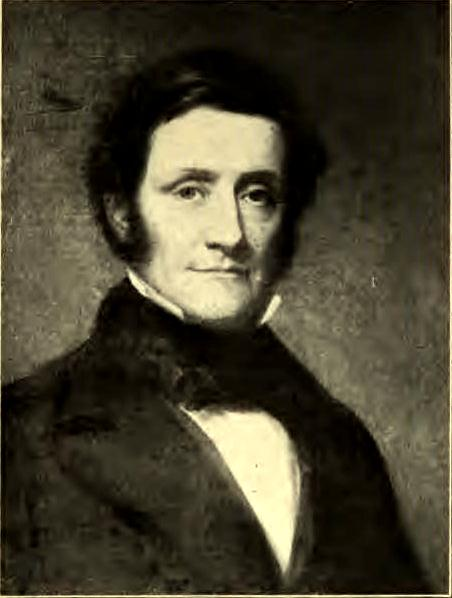
- Portrait of Rodgers, c. 1840
- Born: October 18, 1793; New York City, New York, U.S.
- Died: November 9, 1851 (aged 58); New York City, New York, U.S.
- Occupation: Surgeon
- Known for: Founding the New York Eye Infirmary

John Kearny Rodgers (October 18, 1793 – November 9, 1851) was an American surgeon who was known for his skill in both ophthalmic and vascular surgery. He was the co-founder (with Edward Delafield) of the New York Eye Infirmary and a Fellow and Trustee of the New York College of Physicians and Surgeons.

== Life and career ==
Rodgers was born in New York City in 1794, the elder son of John Richardson Bayard Rodgers and Susannah Ravaud Kearny. His father was a physician who served as a surgeon in the Revolutionary Army and was later a professor at the New York College of Physicians and Surgeons. His paternal grandfather, John Rodgers, was the pastor of the First Presbyterian Church in Manhattan for many years. Rodgers's younger brother, Ravaud Kearney Rodgers (1796–1879), also became a Presbyterian minister. Rodgers studied as an undergraduate at Princeton College, followed by medical studies at the New York College of Physicians and Surgeons and training with Wright Post, a prominent New York surgeon. After graduating from the College of Physicians and Surgeons in 1816, he and his fellow student there, Edward Delafield, went to London for further training. Both of them focused on ophthalmology, which they studied at Moorfields Eye Hospital (then called the London Dispensary for Curing Diseases of the Eye and Ear).

In 1818, shortly after his return to New York, Rodgers was appointed as a demonstrator in the anatomy department of the College of Physicians and Surgeons and also went into private practice. In 1820, he and Delafield founded the New York Eye Infirmary which provided free eye care to the poor of New York City. For the first two years, the two young doctors financed the infirmary themselves. Rodgers continued to serve as the infirmary's surgeon for many years. In 1822, he was also appointed as surgeon to the New York Hospital, a position he held until his death in 1851. In a biographical sketch read before the New York Academy of Medicine on October 6, 1852, Edward Delafield noted that in the course of his career, Rodgers had also been a consulting surgeon to the New York Lying-In Asylum, the Institution for the Blind, and the Emigrants' Hospital. He was also an honorary member of the New York Pathological Society and a former president of the New York County Medical Society and vice-president of the Academy of Medicine.

Rodgers had married Mary Ridgely Nicholson in 1823. The couple had two sons and four daughters before her death from tuberculosis. He married Emily Hosack, the youngest daughter of David Hosack, in November 1846 and had two more daughters. Five years after their marriage, Rodgers died from liver inflammation followed by peritonitis. He was attended by several physicians during his month-long illness, with serious disagreements between them as to the appropriateness of his treatment and the ultimate cause of his death. Shortly afterwards, one of the physicians, Alexander Eddy Hosack (who was also Rodgers's brother-in-law), wrote a treatise on his death, "History of the Case of the Late John Kearney Rodgers, M.D: Addressed to the Profession", in which he criticised the treatments used by the other physicians.
