= Eugene Floyd DuBois =

American physician and teacher (1882–1959)

Eugene Floyd DuBois (June 4, 1882 in West New Brighton– February 12, 1959) was an American physician and teacher, remembered for his work on the physiology of fever and heat production. His grandmother Mary Ann Delafield DuBois founded a hospital in New York City in 1854.

He graduated from Harvard College and in 1906 from the Columbia College of Physicians and Surgeons. He and Rebeckah Rutter were married in 1910. While also teaching at Cornell Medical College, he was medical director of the Russell Sage Institute of Pathology from 1911 until he retired.

During World War II, DuBois was a captain in the United States Naval Reserve, where he taught gas warfare training and defense, aviation medicine, and deep diving and submarine ventilation. Before the advent of nuclear powered submarines, DuBois spent 96 hours submerged, the record for the time.

DuBois mapped out basal metabolism for aging men, which he published in 1916. The Aub-DuBois table is still in use today.

He was most proud of the concept, worked out with David P. Barr, that the body can give off as much heat with a cool skin as with warm skin.

DuBois thought his "chief contribution was popularizing the simple, fundamental principles of metabolism in disease so that they eventually found their way into the textbooks and habits of thought."

DuBois was elected to the American Academy of Arts and Sciences in 1931, the United States National Academy of Sciences in 1933, and the American Philosophical Society in 1940.
