= Virginia Blood =

American politician (1908–1987)

- Blood c. 1940

Member of the Connecticut House of Representatives from Darien
- In office 1941–1945 Serving with Thomas O'Connor
- Preceded by: Thomas O'Connor; Elizabeth P. Renshaw
- Succeeded by: Thomas O'Connor; Edward Henry Delafield

Personal details
- Born: November 5, 1908 Madison, New Jersey, U.S.
- Died: September 17, 1987 (aged 78) Stamford, Connecticut, U.S.
- Party: Republican

Virginia L. Blood (November 5, 1908 – September 17, 1987) was an American politician who served in the Connecticut House of Representatives from 1941 to 1945, representing the town of Darien as a Republican.

== Personal life ==
Blood was born on November 5, 1908, in Madison, New Jersey, to George and Julia Blood. She later moved to Darien, Connecticut.

== Career ==
A Republican, Blood was first elected to the Connecticut House of Representatives in 1940, and she served two terms representing the town of Darien alongside fellow Republican Thomas O'Connor. Blood did not run for reelection in 1944. She was a member of U.S. Congresswoman Clare Boothe Luce's staff in the 1940s.

Blood volunteered with the Committee for Economic Development, and in the 1950s, she worked as a volunteer guide for the Federal Civil Defense Administration. Later, she worked for 25 years as a public relations and program consultant for the nonprofit organization March of Dimes. She retired in 1982.

== Death ==
Blood died on September 17, 1987, at Stamford Hospital in Stamford, Connecticut. She was 78.
