= John Delafield =

English-American merchant and socialite (1748–1824)

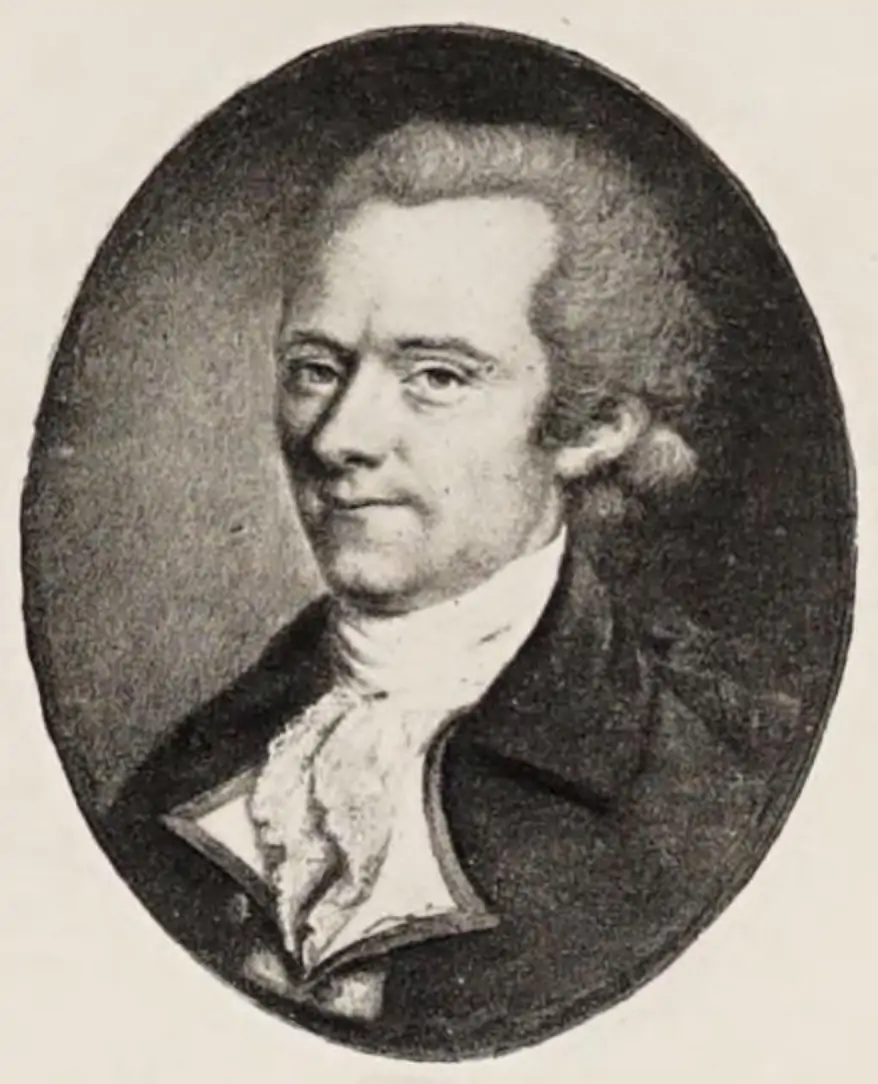
- Delafield, c. 1780–1800
- Born: March 16, 1748; Cripplegate, Middlesex, England
- Died: July 3, 1824 (aged 76); New York City, New York, U.S.
- Occupation: Merchant
- Spouse: Ann Hallett
- Children: Joseph Delafield; Richard Delafield; Edward Delafield; Rufus King Delafield
- Relatives: Thomas Arnold (nephew)

John Delafield (March 16, 1748 – July 3, 1824) was an English-American merchant and financier, notable for delivering the Treaty of Paris (the treaty resulting in the conclusion of the Revolutionary War) to New York in 1783.

== Early life ==
Delafield was born in England on March 16, 1748, in Cripplegate, London. He was the son of John Delafield (1714–1763), an affluent cheese merchant, and Martha (née Dell) Delafield (1719–1761). Among his siblings were Joseph Delafield, Martha Delafield (wife of William Arnold and mother of Dr. Thomas Arnold), and William Unsworth Delafield (who died in West Bengal, India in 1771), among others.

His paternal grandparents were John Delafield and Sarah (née Goodwin) Delafield. His maternal grandparents were John Dell and Susannah (née Farnborough) Dell.

== Career ==
Delafield was among the first Englishmen to settle in America as the Revolutionary War came to a close. Arriving in New York City in the spring of 1783, while it was still under British control, he brought with him the first copy of the provisional treaty of peace between the United States and Great Britain.

He was said to have arrived with significant wealth, holding the title of “Count of the Holy Roman Empire” by descent, and by the turn of the century, had become one of New York's wealthiest individuals, earning the title "one of the fathers of Wall Street." His mansion, located across the East River from New York City, was a grand estate where he lived with his wife, Ann Hallett—herself from a notable Revolutionary family—and their eleven children. He was an original director of the Mutual Insurance Company of New York, established by Alexander Hamilton in 1787, and later became president of the United Insurance Company.

== Personal life ==
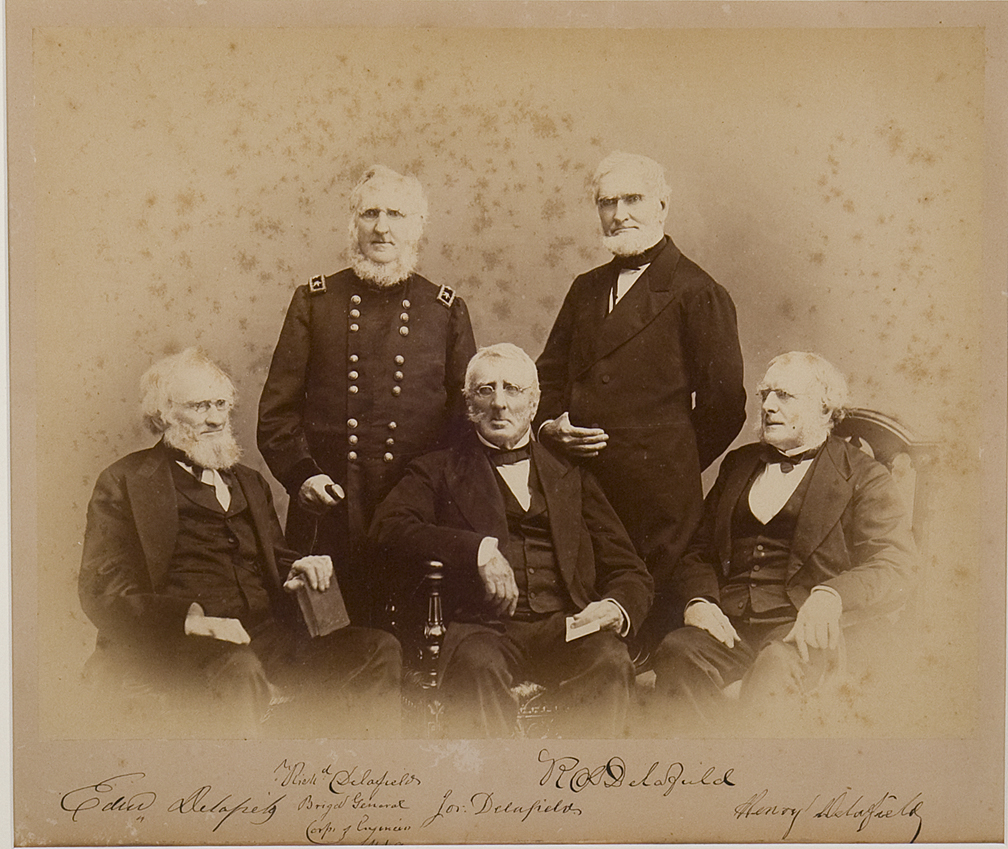
Photograph of members of his family, c. 1870

Delafield was married to Ann Hallett (1766–1839), a daughter of Joseph Hallett III and Elizabeth (née Hazard) Hallett. Among her siblings was Maria Hallett, the second wife of U.S. Representative Benjamin Tallmadge. Together, they lived at 16 Wall Street in New York City, and were the parents of eleven children, including:

- John Delafield III (1786–1853), who married Harriet Wadsworth Tallmadge, a daughter of his uncle, Benjamin Tallmadge, from his first marriage to Mary Floyd (a daughter of signer William Floyd).
- Joseph Delafield (1790–1875), who married Julia Livingston, a daughter of Maturin Livingston and Margaret Lewis Livingston (only daughter and heiress of Gov. Morgan Lewis).
- William Delafield (1792–1853), a merchant.
- Henry Delafield (1792–1875), a merchant who married Mary (née Parish) Monson, a daughter of Penn Parish and widow of Judge Levinus Monson, in 1865.
- Edward Delafield (1794–1875), a doctor who married Elinor Elizabeth Elwyn, a daughter of Thomas Elwyn. After her death in 1834, he married Julia Floyd, a daughter of Nicoll Floyd (and granddaughter of William Floyd).
- Richard Delafield (1798–1873), who married Harriet Baldwin Covington, a daughter of Gen. Elijah Moorman Covington, in 1833.
- Rufus King Delafield (1802–1874), who married Eliza Bard, the daughter of William Bard, in 1836.
- Susan Maria Delafield (1805–1861), who married merchant Henry Parish, a son of Jacob Parish and brother to Daniel Parish.

His summer residence, on 140-acres, built in 1791 on the East River opposite Blackwell's Island, was known as" Sunswick" and was one of the largest and best appointed private houses near New York.

He died on July 3, 1824, at the age of 76.
