= Edward Delafield =

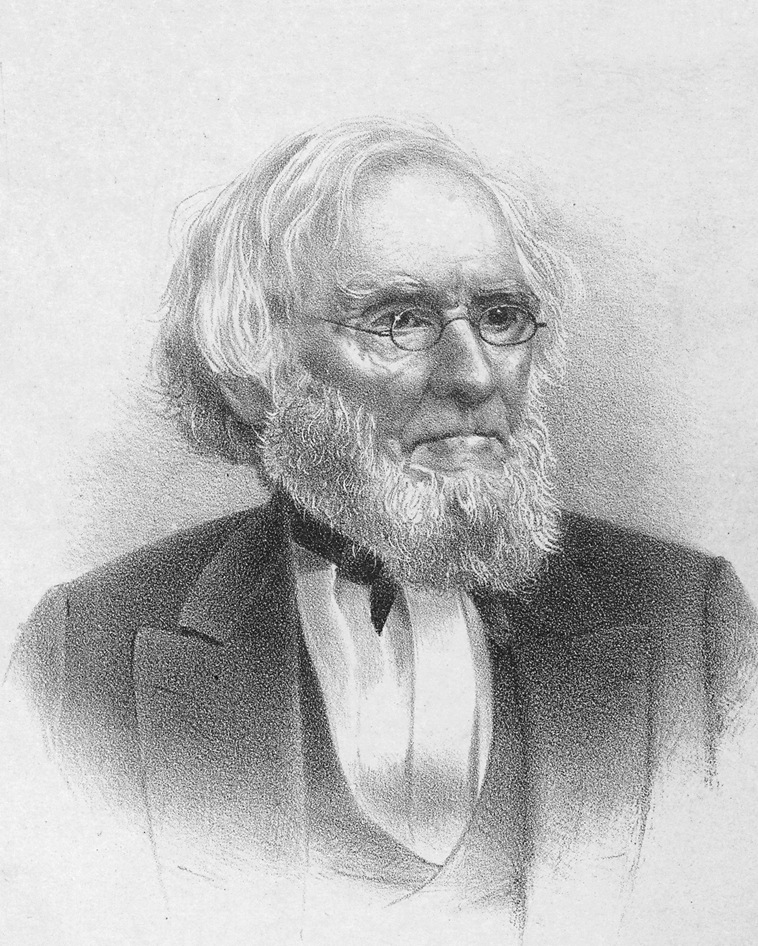
- Born: May 7, 1794; New York City, US
- Died: February 13, 1875 (aged 80); New York City, US
- Education: Yale University; New York College of Physicians and Surgeons
- Occupation: Physician
- Known for: Founding the New York Eye Infirmary
- Spouses: Eleanor Langdon Elwyn (m. 1821; died 1834) Julia Floyd (m. 1839)
- Children: Francis Delafield
- Relatives: Richard Delafield (brother); Joseph Delafield (brother); Rufus King Delafield (brother)

Edward Delafield (May 7, 1794 – February 13, 1875) was an American medical doctor, primarily known as an ophthalmologist, but also for his work in obstetrics and gynaecology. He was the co-founder (with John Kearney Rodgers) of the New York Eye Infirmary and the first president of the American Ophthalmological Society. From 1858 until his death he was the president of the College of Physicians and Surgeons in New York City. His son, Francis Delafield, also became a prominent physician.

Edward Delafield is buried at the Delafield Family Mausoleum

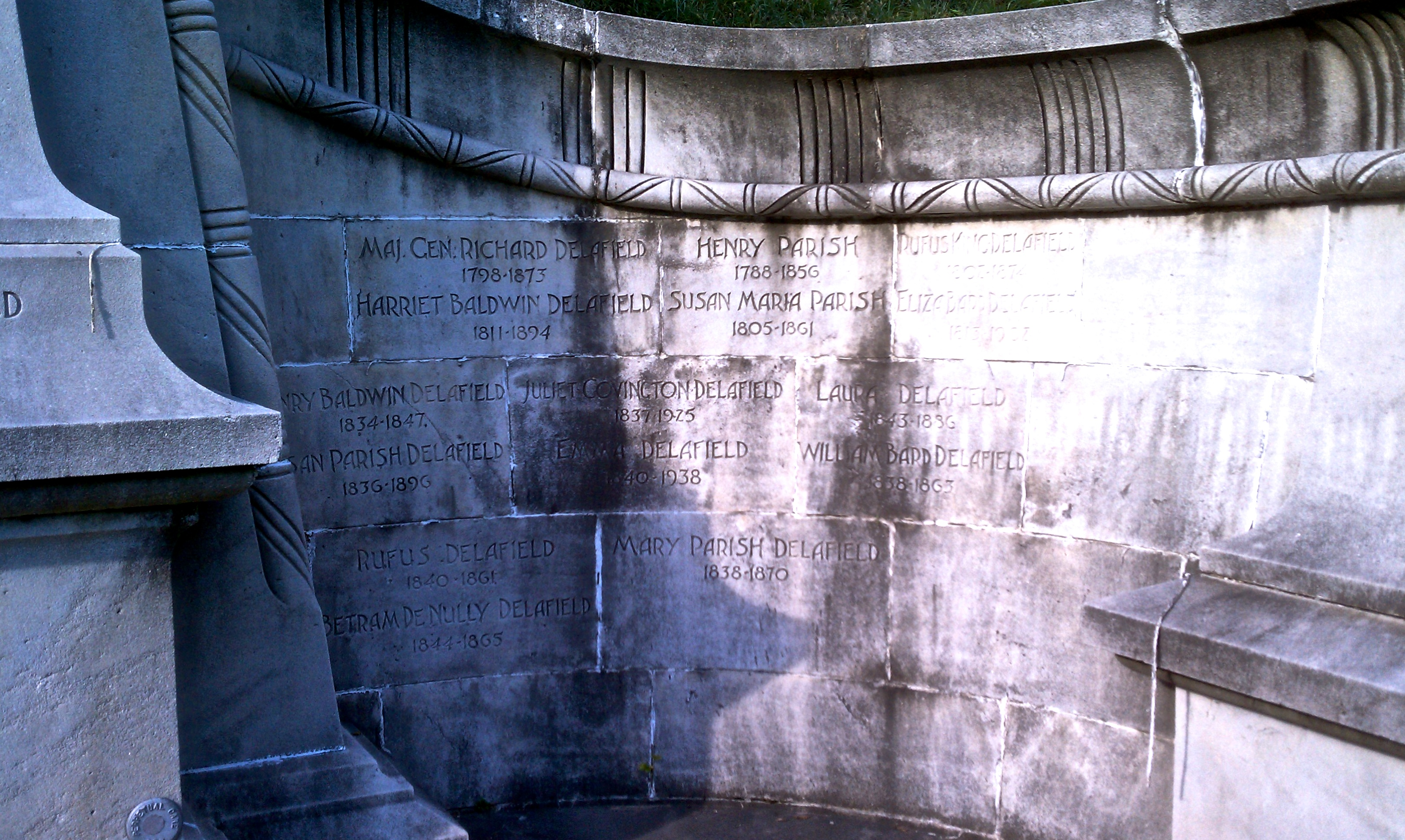
Delafield Family Mausoleum Inscriptions

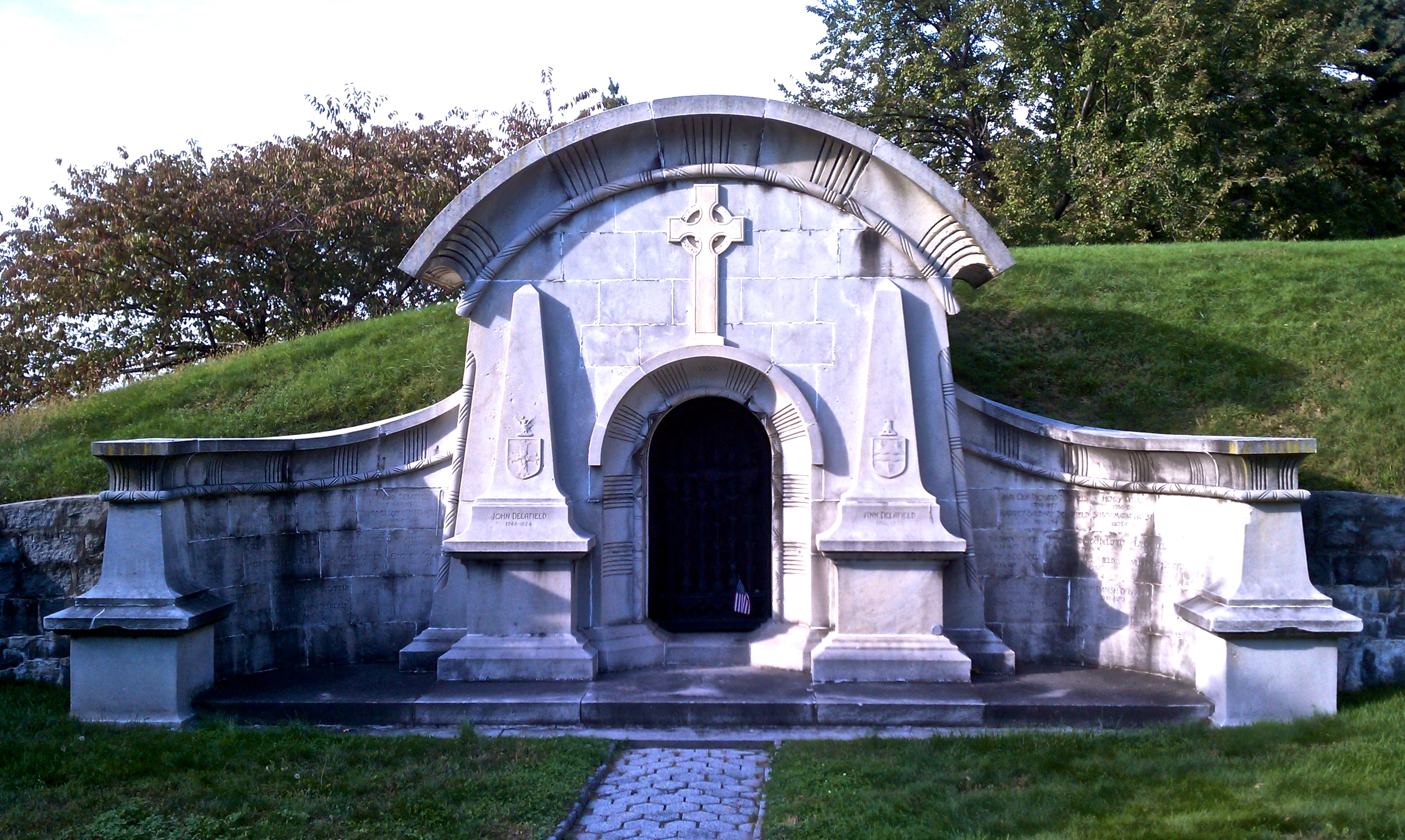
Delafield Family Mausoleum(close)

== Early life ==
Delafield was born in New York City, one of the 14 children to John Delafield and Anne (née Hallett) Delafield. His father emigrated to New York from England in 1788 and made a fortune as a merchant. Among his siblings were brothers Joseph Delafield, Maj. Gen. Richard Delafield and Rufus King Delafield.

=== Education and War of 1812 ===
Delafield was educated at Union Hall Academy before entering Yale University, where he graduated with a Bachelor of Arts in 1812. He then studied medicine at the New York College of Physicians and Surgeons while simultaneously training under a prominent New York surgeon, Samuel Borrowe.

His medical studies were interrupted by the War of 1812. He and his brothers Henry, William, and Joseph joined the "Iron Grays", a private infantry company formed in 1814 and charged with protecting New York City from the perceived (but unrealized) threat of a British invasion. Delafield served as the company's surgeon and as a surgeon in the New York company of the Sea Fencibles Battalion.

Delafield graduated from the College of Physicians and Surgeons in 1816. His inaugural dissertation on tuberculosis was written under the guidance of Samuel Borrowe. Later that year, he and his fellow student at the college, John Kearney Rodgers, went to London for further training. They studied under Astley Paston Cooper and John Abernethy at St Thomas's Hospital and St. Bartholomew's Hospital but focused primarily on ophthalmology, which they studied at Moorfields Eye Hospital (then called the London Dispensary for Curing Diseases of the Eye and Ear). Delafield also spent some months studying in Paris hospitals. His meticulous handwritten and indexed notes of the lectures he attended, primarily those of Abernethy and Paston, consist of over 3000 pages and are preserved in the New York Academy of Medicine.

== Career ==
After his return to New York in 1818, Delafield went into private practice. In 1820, he and Rodgers founded the New York Eye Infirmary which provided free eye care to the poor of New York City. For the first two years, the two young doctors financed the infirmary themselves. Delafield remained the infirmary's attending surgeon until 1850, and consulting surgeon until 1870. In the early 1820s, he went into partnership with his former mentor Samuel Borrowe in what was to become a large and lucrative private practice. In 1825 the first American edition of Benjamin Travers's A Synopsis of Diseases of the Eye and their Treatment was published with additions and extensive notes by Delafield. The following year he was appointed Professor of obstetrics and diseases of women and children at the College of Physicians and Surgeons. In 1834, he was also appointed attending physician to the New York Hospital. However, in 1838 he gave up these two positions due to the increasing pressure of work at his private practice.

In subsequent years Delafield went on to hold many prominent positions in the medical establishment of New York. In 1842 he became the founding president of the Society for the Relief of Widows and Orphans of Medical Men and in 1847 was a founding fellow of the New York Academy of Medicine. He was the first President of the Medical Board of the Nursery and Child's Hospital founded by his niece, Mary Ann Delafield DuBois, in 1854 and served as its consulting physician for the rest of his life. In 1858 he was appointed senior consulting physician at St. Luke's Hospital (now Mount Sinai Morningside) and president of the College of Physicians and Surgeons, a position he held until his death. He was one of the founders of the American Ophthalmological Society, the oldest specialty medical society in the United States, and became its first president in 1864. He also served as senior consulting physician of the Woman's Hospital and president of the Roosevelt Hospital (now Mount Sinai West).

== Personal life ==
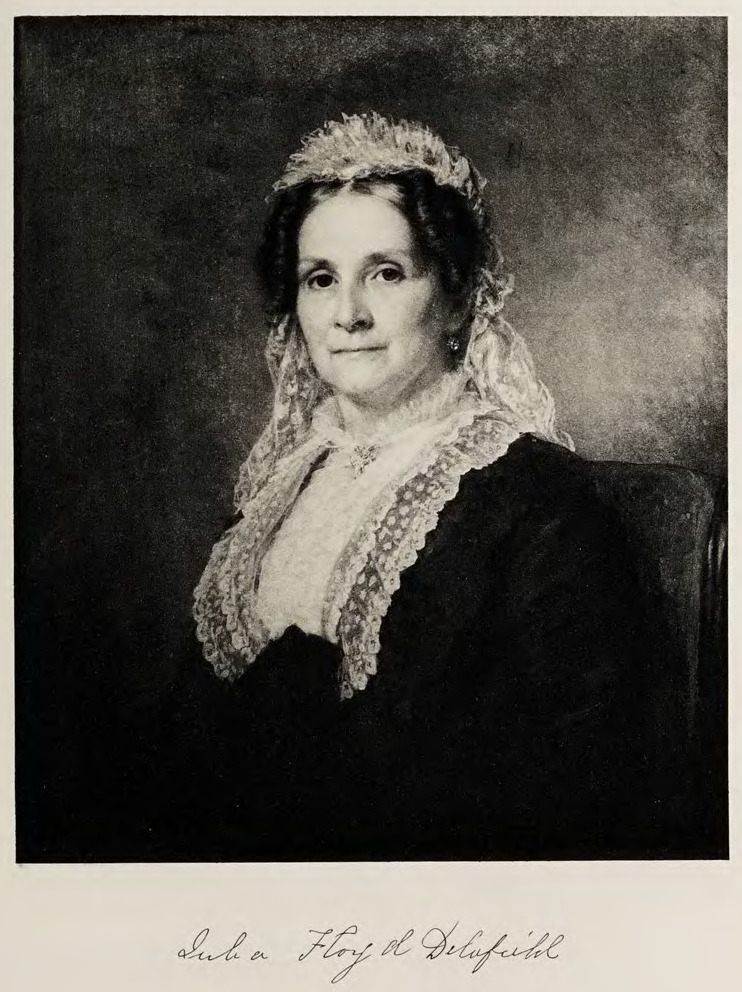
Julia Floyd Delafield

Delafield was married twice. In 1821 he married Eleanor Elizabeth Langdon Elwyn (1799–1834), the granddaughter of New Hampshire's second Governor, John Langdon. Eleanor died from tuberculosis in 1834. All of the six children from that marriage eventually died from the same disease.

His second wife was Julia Floyd (1808–1879), the granddaughter of William Floyd. They married in 1839 and had five children, including:

- Francis Delafield (1841–1915), the physician and pathologist
- Augustus Floyd Delafield
- Emma Delafield

In 1859, Dr. Edward Delafield and his second wife Julia Floyd bought their initial 50 acres of land in Darien, Connecticut for $6,000. Construction on their summer house "Felsenhof" was completed in 1861. They continued to buy neighboring plots around the main house and eventually amassed 165 acres on Scott's cove. Edward Delafield died at his home in New York City in 1875 at the age of 80. He was buried in Green-Wood Cemetery with the last two of his surviving brothers, Joseph and Henry, following a joint funeral at Trinity Church in New York City. All three brothers died within three days of each other. Julia died in 1879 at "Felsenhof", the family's summer home in Darien, Connecticut.
