= Levinus Monson =

American judge

Levinus Monson (May 5, 1792 - September 23, 1859) was an American jurist. He served on the Supreme Court of New York.

== Early life ==
Monson was the son of Joshua and Sarah (Booth) Munson, and was born in Hamden, Connecticut, May 5, 1791 or 1792.

== Education and career ==
Monson enrolled at Yale University in 1809 and graduated in 1811. He studied law with Samuel Sherwood, in Delhi, New York. After his admission to the bar in 1815, he removed to Hobart, New York, where he resided until his death, excepting a short period while he was a resident of Newburgh, New York. He was for many years a Judge of the New York Court of Common Pleas, in Delaware County, New York, and on the death of Judge Morehouse of Cooperstown, New York, he was in 1850 appointed to fill the vacancy on the bench of the Supreme Court of New York.

== Personal life ==
On March 23, 1936 Monson married Mary Parish, and they had four daughters. He died in Hobart, New York on September 23, 1859, aged 68. His widow died May 3, 1883, in New York City.

This article incorporates public domain material from the Yale Obituary Record.
