= Richard Delafield =

Union Army general (1798–1873)

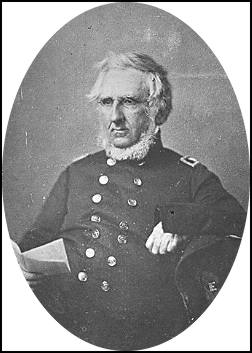
- Richard Delafield by Mathew Brady
- Born: September 1, 1798; New York City, New York, U.S.
- Died: November 5, 1873 (aged 75); Washington, D.C., U.S.
- Burial place: Green-Wood Cemetery Brooklyn, New York
- Spouse: Harriet Baldwin
- Children: 6
- Relatives: Edward Delafield (brother); Rufus King Delafield (brother); Joseph Delafield (brother)
- Military career
- Allegiance: United States of America; Union
- Branch: United States Army; Union Army
- Service years: 1818–1866
- Rank: Brigadier General; Brevet Major General
- Commands: Superintendent of the United States Military Academy United States Army Corps of Engineers
- Conflicts: Crimean War (observer); American Civil War

Richard Delafield (September 1, 1798 – November 5, 1873) was a United States Army officer for 52 years. He served as superintendent of the United States Military Academy for a total of 12 years. At the start of the American Civil War, then Colonel Delafield helped equip and send volunteers from New York to the Union Army. He also was in command of defenses around New York Harbor from 1861 to April 1864. On April 22, 1864, he was promoted to brigadier general in the Regular Army of the United States and Chief of Engineers. On March 8, 1866, President Andrew Johnson nominated Delafield for appointment to the grade of brevet major general in the Regular Army, to rank from March 13, 1865, and the United States Senate confirmed the appointment on May 4, 1866, reconfirmed due to a technicality on July 14, 1866. He retired from the US Army on August 8, 1866. He later served on two commissions relating to improvements to Boston Harbor and to lighthouses. He also served as a regent of the Smithsonian Institution.

== Early life ==
Richard Delafield was born in New York City on September 1, 1798. He was one of the 14 children of John Delafield and Anne (née Hallett) Delafield. His father had emigrated to New York from England in 1788 and made a fortune as a merchant. Edward Delafield, a prominent American physician, Joseph Delafield, a lawyer and diplomat, and Rufus King Delafield, a banker and manufacturer, were among his brothers.

He was the first graduate of the United States Military Academy to receive a merit class standing, ranking first in the class of 1818. During his time at West Point he also became the first cadet teacher detailed as acting assistant professor of mathematics in 1815.

Commissioned as a second lieutenant in the Corps of Engineers, he served as topographical draftsman for the American Boundary Commission, along with his brother Joseph Delafield. The commission established the northern boundary between the United States and Canada under the Treaty of Ghent.

== Military career ==
Delafield served as assistant engineer in the construction of Hampton Roads defenses from 1819 to 1824 and was in charge of fortifications and surveys in the Mississippi River delta area in 1824–1832. While superintendent of repair work on the Cumberland Road east of the Ohio River, he designed and built Dunlap's Creek Bridge in Brownsville, Pennsylvania, the first cast-iron tubular-arch bridge in the United States. Commissioned a major of engineers in July 1838, he was appointed superintendent of the Military Academy after the fire of 1838 and served till 1845. He designed the new buildings and the new cadet uniform that first displayed the castle insignia. He superintended the construction of coast defenses for New York Harbor from 1846 to 1855.

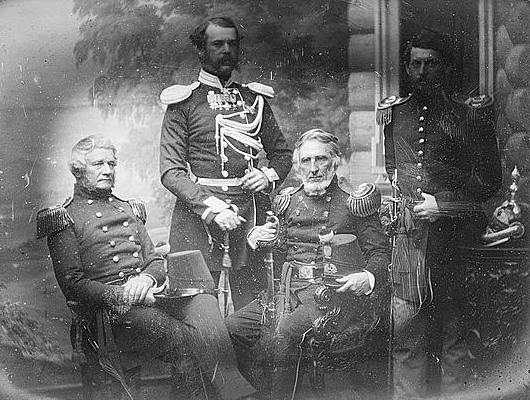
The Delafield Commission in Russia (possibly St. Petersburg). Left to right: Alfred Mordecai, Lt. Colonel Obrescoff (Russian escort), Richard Delafield, and George B. McClellan

In the beginning of 1855, Delafield was appointed by the Secretary of War, Jefferson Davis a head of the board of officers, later called The Delafield Commission, and sent to Europe to study the European military. The board included Captain George B. McClellan and Major Alfred Mordecai. They inspected the state of the military in Great Britain, Germany, the Austrian Empire, France, Belgium, and Russia, and served as military observers during the Crimean War. After his return in April 1856, Delafield submitted a report which was later published as a book by Congress, Report on the Art of War in Europe in 1854, 1855, and 1856. The book was suppressed during the American Civil War due to fears that it would be instructive to Confederate engineers as it contained multiple drawings and descriptions of military fortifications.

Delafield served as superintendent of the Military Academy again in 1856–1861. In January 1861, he was succeeded by Captain Pierre G. T. Beauregard, who was dismissed shortly after Beauregard's home state of Louisiana seceded from the Union, and Delafield returned as superintendent serving until March 1, 1861. In the beginning of the Civil War he advised the governor of New York Edwin D. Morgan during the volunteer force creation. Then, in 1861–1864, he was put in charge of New York Harbor defenses, including Governors Island and Fort at Sandy Hook. On May 19, 1864, he was commissioned a brigadier-general after replacing Joseph Gilbert Totten, who had died, as the Chief of Engineers, United States Army Corps of Engineers, on April 22, 1864. He stayed in charge of the Bureau of Engineers of the War Department until his retirement on August 8, 1866. On March 8, 1866, President Andrew Johnson nominated Delafield for appointment to the grade of brevet major general in the Regular Army of the United States, to rank from March 13, 1865, and the United States Senate confirmed the appointment on May 4, 1866, and reconfirmed it due to a technicality on July 14, 1866.

== Later life ==
After retirement Delafield served as a regent of the Smithsonian Institution and a member of the Lighthouse Board. He died in Washington, D.C., on November 5, 1873. The Secretary of War ordered that 13 guns be fired in his memory at West Point. He is buried at Green-Wood Cemetery in Brooklyn, New York.

== Family ==
Delafield's first wife Helen Summers, whom he married in 1824, died four months into the marriage. In 1833 he married Harriet Baldwin Covington (1811–1894), with whom he had eight children, among them:

- Henry Baldwin Delafield (1834–1847)
- Susan Parish Delafield (1836–1896)
- Juliet Covington Delafield (1837–1925)
- Emma Delafield (1840–1938)
- Laura Delafield (1843–1886)
- Albert Delafield (1846–1920), who married Julia Floyd (1846–1929), granddaughter of U.S. Representative William Floyd
Delafield Family Mausoleum

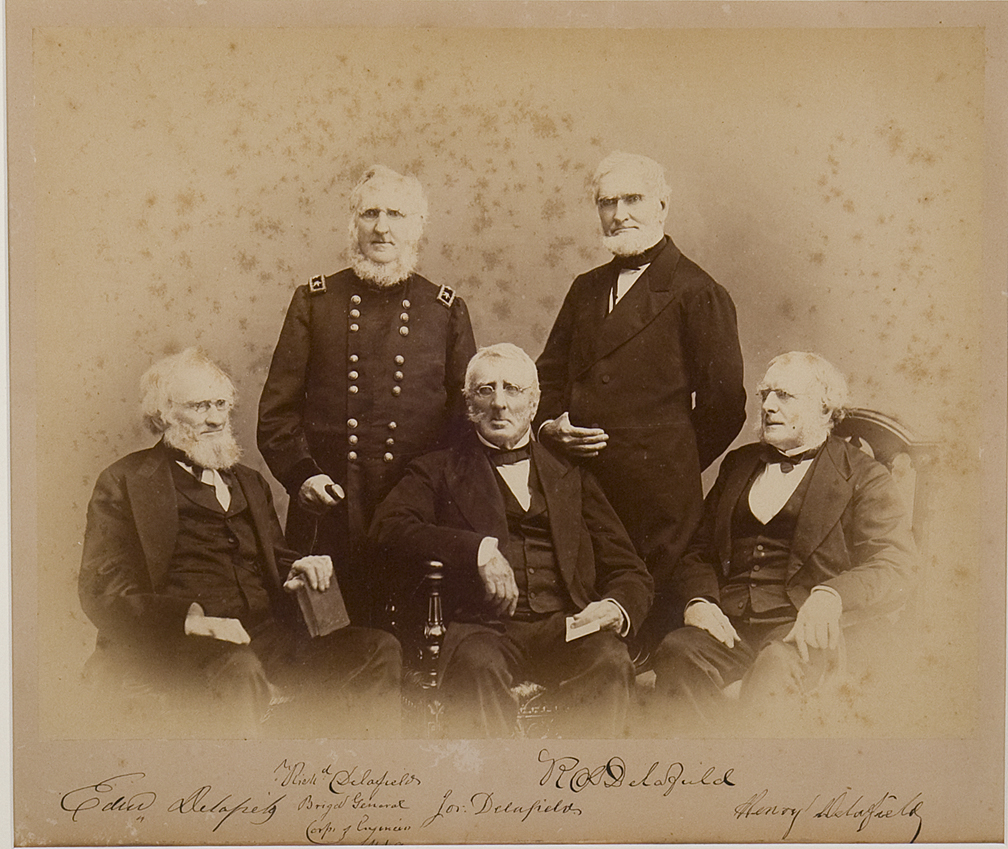
Members of the Delafield family, circa 1870

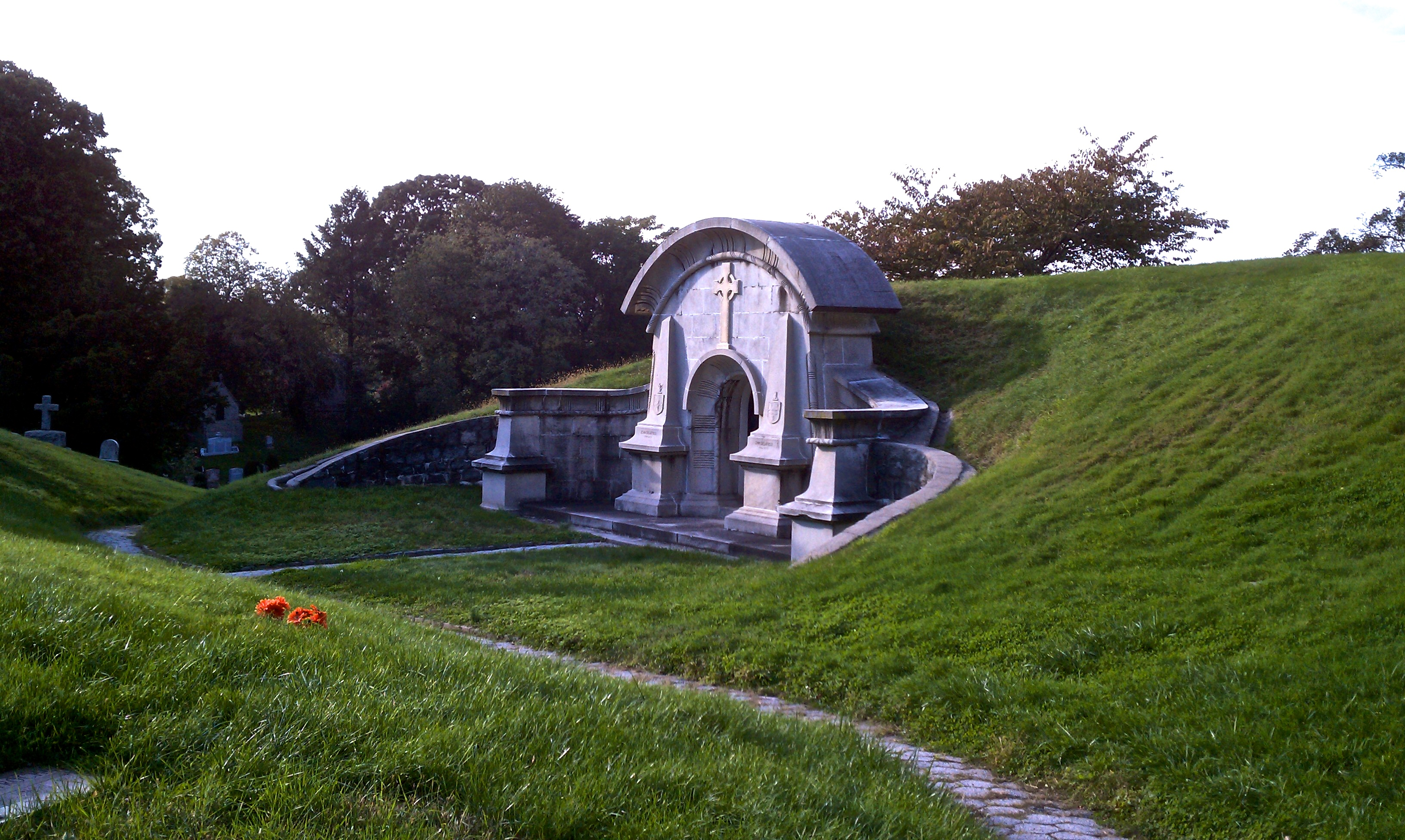
Delafield Family Mausoleum

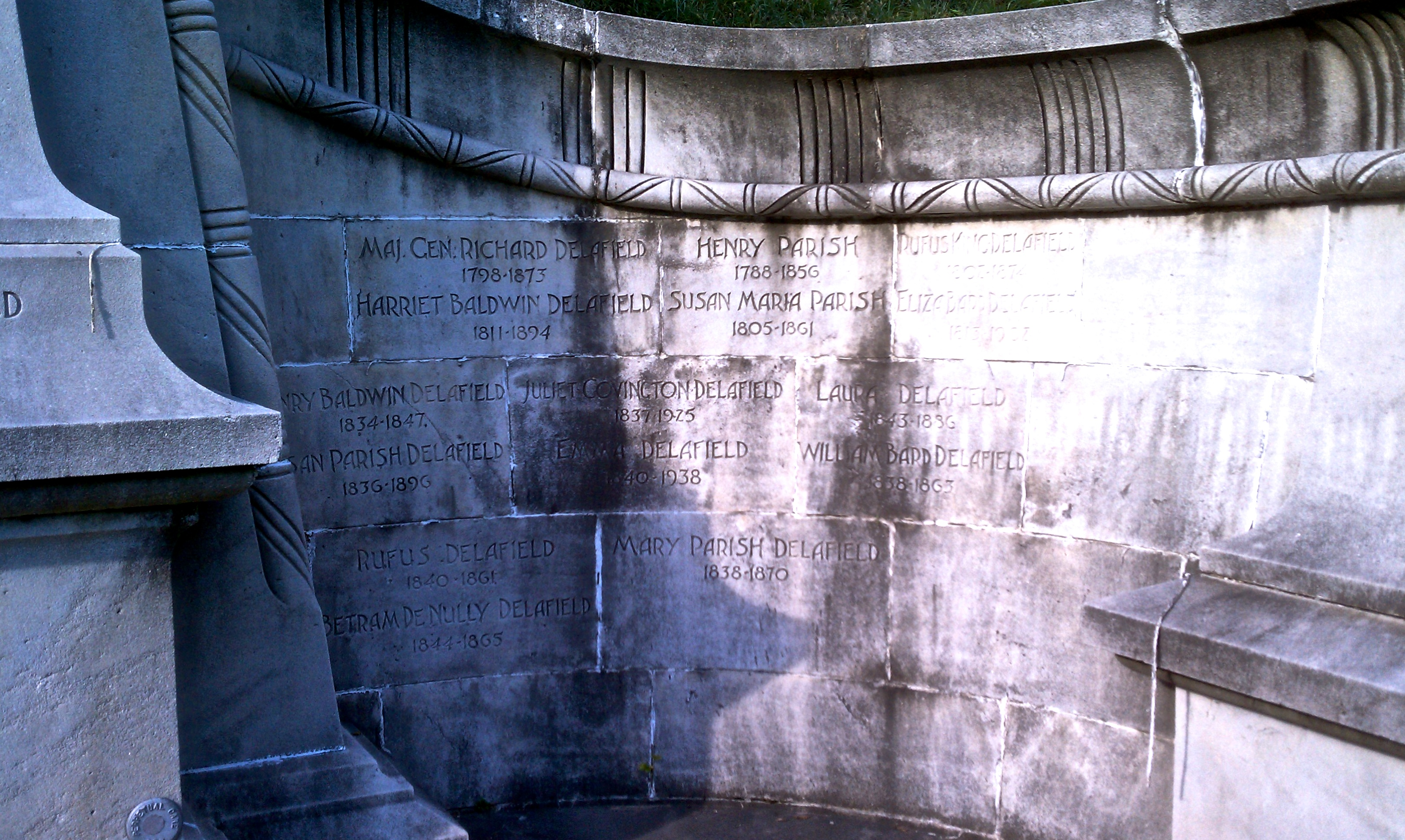
Delafield Family Mausoleum inscriptions

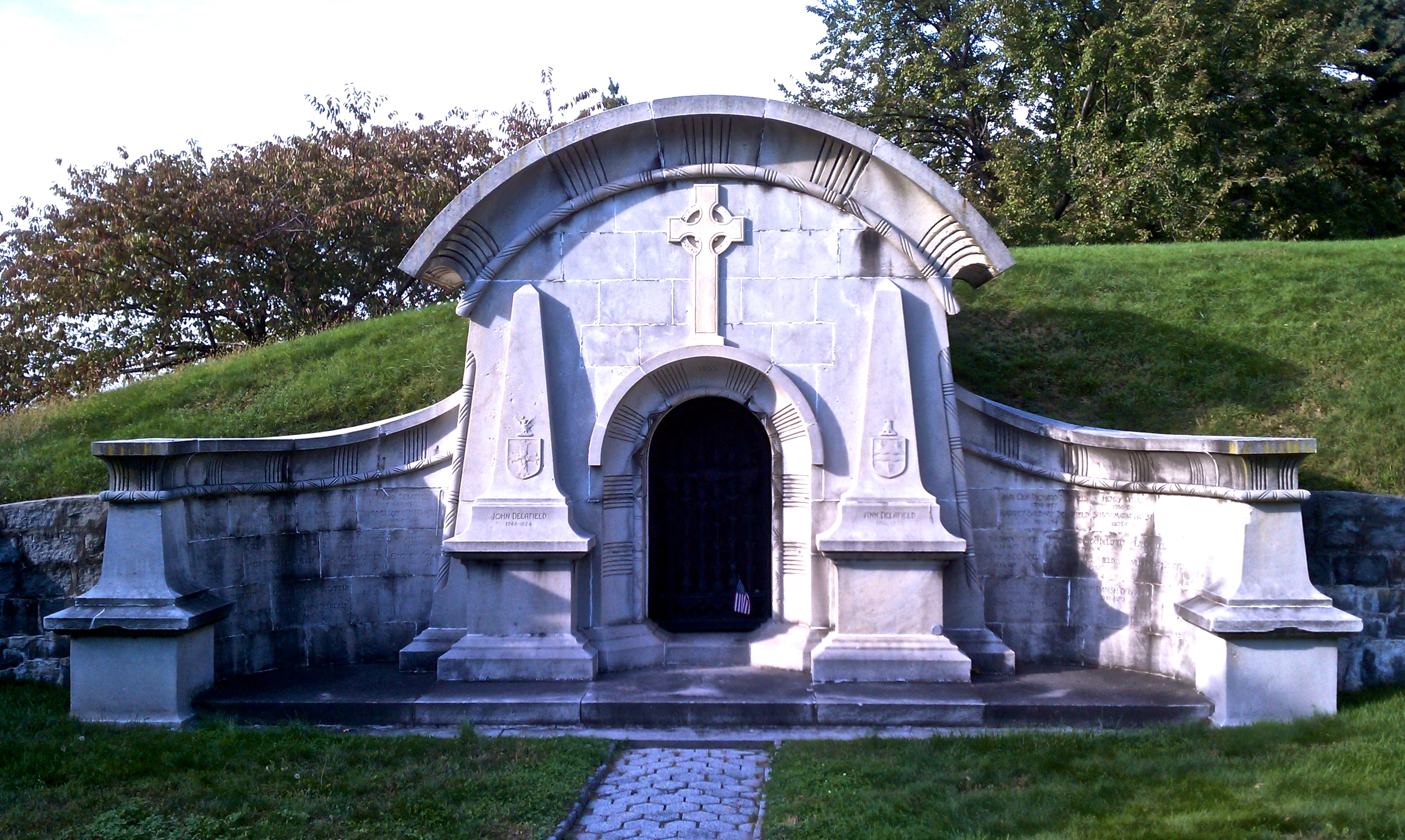
Delafield Family Mausoleum (close-up)

== See also ==
- List of American Civil War generals (Union)

Military offices
Preceded by René Edward De Russy	Superintendent of the U.S. Military Academy; 1838–1845	Succeeded by Henry Brewerton
Preceded by John Gross Barnard	Superintendent of the U.S. Military Academy; 1856–1861	Succeeded by P.G.T. Beauregard
Preceded by P.G.T. Beauregard	Superintendent of the U.S. Military Academy; 1861–1861	Succeeded by Alexander Hamilton Bowman
Preceded by Joseph Gilbert Totten	Chief of Engineers; 1864–1866	Succeeded by Andrew A. Humphreys
