= Violetta White Delafield =

American amateur mycologist

- Born: May 10, 1875; Florence, Italy
- Died: May 1, 1949 (aged 73); New York City, US
- Resting place: Woodlawn Cemetery
- Other names: Violetta Susan Elizabeth White; Violetta Susan White
- Children: 4
- Scientific career
- Fields: Mycology
- Author abbrev. (botany): V.S.White

Violetta White Delafield, née Violetta Susan Elizabeth White (1875–1949), was an American botanist, mycologist, scientific illustrator and horticulturist.

== Early life ==
Violetta Susan White was born in Florence, Italy, to expatriate American parents. She spent most of her childhood in southern France. In 1890, Violetta returned to the United States, where she began collecting mushrooms and studying mycology and botany.

== Scientific work ==
Delafield was particularly interested in fungi, and her earliest illustrations date back to 1899. She specialized in Gasteromycetes and many of her specimens were collected in New England and the Hudson Valley.

In the early 20th century, Delafield published three scientific papers under her maiden name, V.S. White, on fungi of the Tylostomaceae and Nidulariaceae families in North America. She also cataloged fungi on Mount Desert Island, Maine, to supplement Edward Lothrop Rand's 1894 work Flora of Mount Desert Island. She also studied Geastrales, more commonly known as earthstars, for a manuscript that remained unpublished. Delafield worked with Lucien Underwood at the New York Botanical Garden where she became a registered investigator, and with Charles H. Peck of the New York State Museum.

Delafield is credited with the discovery of several species of fungi, including eight species of Tulostoma (stalked puffballs). She corresponded with and borrowed mycological specimens from William Alphonso Murrill, the founder of the journal Mycologia. After her marriage, she devoted less time to scientific work but continued to collect specimens in several locations including Buck Hill Falls, Pennsylvania, the Catskills, New York and Litchfield, Connecticut.

Delafield created hundreds of annotated watercolors of fungi and plants, noted for their level of detail; she made a note of the collection location, a detailed specimen description and analysed the cellular structure of the fungus with the help of a microscope. Her extensive illustrations are particularly significant as fungal specimens tend to deteriorate soon after collection and would often change their colour and form. Delafield's significant collection of specimen was left to the Fungal Herbarium at the New York Botanical Garden, her papers and research materials on mycology and horticulture are held with the Delafield family papers by the University of Princeton. A selection of her work was exhibited in 2019 at Bard College as part of the ‘Fruiting Bodies’ exhibition and has been preserved in a digital collection.

== Marriage and family ==
Violetta Susan White married John Ross Delafield (1874–1964) on 14 June 1904 in Manhattan at the Church of the Heavenly Rest and went on to have three children. John Ross Delafield was born in Fieldson, Bronx, to parents from wealthy, prominent Hudson Valley families. The Delafields were related to the Livingston family, who established the country estate known as Montgomery Place, which became the couple's main residence after 1921.

== Montgomery Place ==
After her marriage, Delafield's focus shifted to horticulture, and she was an active member of the Garden Club of America. She redesigned the gardens of Montgomery Place, adding several features including a terraced garden, a lily pond and a reflecting pool. She established several garden rooms which housed a rose garden, a herb garden, and a rock garden. A state of the art working greenhouse was added to the formal gardens in 1929, with underfloor heating to protect the plants from the cold. The greenhouse is now part of Bard Farm, the college's horticulture department. In the 1930s, Delafield added a farm stand to the grounds, enabling farmers to sell their fresh produce by the road.

== Selected publications ==
- White, V. S. (August 1901). "The Tylostomaceae of North America". Bulletin of the Torrey Botanical Club. 28 (8): 421–444. doi:10.2307/2478590. JSTOR 2478590.
- White, V. S. (May 1902). "The Nidulariaceae of North America". Bulletin of the Torrey Botanical Club. 29 (5): 251–280. doi:10.2307/2478721. JSTOR 2478721.
- White, V. S. (September 1902). "Some Mt. Desert Fungi". Bulletin of the Torrey Botanical Club. 29 (9): 550–563. doi:10.2307/2478853. JSTOR 2478853. (See Mount Desert Island.)
