= Francis Delafield =

American physician

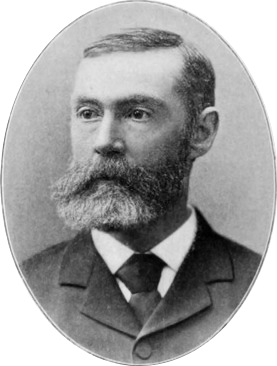
- Born: August 3, 1841; New York City, US
- Died: July 17, 1915 (aged 73); Noroton, Connecticut, US
- Education: Yale University
- Spouse: Katherine Van Rensselaer
- Parent(s): Edward Delafield; Julia Floyd
- Relatives: Henry Bell Van Rensselaer (father-in-law)

Francis Delafield (August 3, 1841 – July 17, 1915) was an American physician, born in New York City. His father, Dr. Edward Delafield, was the son of the prominent John Delafield who had emigrated to America from London, England in 1783 carrying the provisional peace treaty between England and the United States. While his father Edward graduated Yale in 1812, Francis graduated at Yale (1860) and at the College of Physicians and Surgeons, Columbia University (1863), and after further study abroad practiced medicine in New York. Francis was appointed to the staff of Bellevue Hospital (1874), and to the chair of pathology and practice of medicine in the College of Physicians and Surgeons (1875–82).

Francis Delafield resided for many years at 5 West 50th Street in Manhattan, New York. In 1886, he became the first president of the Association of American Physicians.

== Early life ==
Francis Delafield was born in New York City, the son of Edward Delafield by his second marriage to Julia Floyd. Julia Floyd was the granddaughter of William Floyd, a signer of the Declaration of Independence. She was born, raised and married on the Floyd estate in Mastic, Long Island. Francis Delafield's mother Julia Floyd married Dr Edward Delafield in 1839 on the Floyd family's property in Long Island (currently the William Floyd House museum). She kept an extensive journal of her life during the Civil war until her death. She was one of a few women invited to attend Lincoln's 2nd inauguration. Julia Floyd was also the first woman in New York to use ether to ease pain during childbirth. She endured hardship. Julia Floyd Delafield watched all of her husband's six children die of tuberculosis (his first wife had died of it also). Some of her five biological children also suffered from tuberculosis and died. And even her son [Francis Delafield] became gravely sick and nearly died.

Francis' brother Augustus Floyd Delafield travelled extensively around Scotland and brought back a set of golf clubs in 1880s. The sport became popular in Darien and Augustus founded the Wee Burn Country Club in 1893.

From London, Francis' grandfather (John Delafied) emigrated to New York City. The ship upon which he took passage bore letters of marque, and captured a French vessel. John Delafield volunteered in the action, and shared the prize money to the extent of £100. He landed in New York City on April 5, 1783, and found himself especially welcomed as the bearer of a manuscript copy of the text of the treaty of peace, which had been handed him at the moment of sailing by an official in the British service. The conditions of peace were known, but the text had not yet been made public in England; and, although the official copy had been forwarded, the "Vigilant" had outstripped the bearer of the government dispatches by some days.

John Delafield was a founder and director of the Mutual insurance company, established on June 15, 1787, that being the first company organized to take risks against fire in the City of New York after the Revolution. On January 12, 1792, he was appointed director of the branch of the U. S. bank, and was afterward elected to the same office. He was one of forty gentlemen who subscribed $10,000 each, and founded (February 1, 1796) the United insurance company, also acting as a director, and serving as president for many years. His summer residence on the East River, opposite Blackwell's Island, known as "Sunswick," built in 1791, was one of the largest and best appointed private houses near New York. John Delafield had nine sons and four daughters. Two of his sons died young.

Francis Delafield was fitted for college in private schools in New York City, and at Yale received a dissertation appointment in junior year and was a member of Phi Beta Kappa. In 1863, he graduated from the College of Physicians and Surgeons at Columbia, and then for some months continued his medical studies abroad — in Paris, Berlin and London.

== Career ==
Upon his return to the U.S. in 1865, he became surgeon in the New York Eye and Ear Infirmary, and physician and pathologist in 1871 to the Roosevelt Hospital (now Mount Sinai West). He was the founder of the first pathological laboratory in US, and his writings upon pathological subjects were accepted as standard authorities. His first important literary work, "A Handbook of Post-Mortem Examination and Morbid Anatomy" (1872) was later rewritten and enlarged into "A Handbook of Pathological Anatomy and Histology" (1885) and became a textbook for medical colleges. In 1878, appeared his "Manual of Physical Diagnosis," and in 1895 "Diseases of the Kidneys". Another achievement was his classification of the group of diseases generally treated under pulmonary consumption. Probably his most important contribution to medicine was "Studies in Pathological Anatomy," published in 1882. Since 1868, when he became a lecturer on pathological anatomy in the College of Physicians and Surgeons, Delafield had been a member of the Faculty of Columbia University. In 1875, he was appointed adjunct professor of medicine under Professor Alonzo Clark, and upon the latter's retirement in 1882 was elected his successor, as professor of pathology and the practice of medicine, being made professor emeritus in 1901. For a number of years since 1874, he was attached to the staff of Bellevue Hospital, at first as a member of the house staff, later as attending physician, and finally as consulting physician. He had served also as pathologist and attending physician to Roosevelt Hospital and as surgeon to the New York Eye and Ear Infirmary. In 1890, he was honored with the degree of LL.D. from Yale, and, in 1904, Columbia conferred a similar degree upon him. He held membership in the New York County Medical Society, the New York Academy of Medicine, the Pathological Society, and the Association of American Physicians, becoming the first president of the latter organization in 1886.

=== Attended William McKinley ===
Francis Delafield was the primary physician who was consulted following the shooting of United States President William McKinley in September 1901. While Francis argued to use the X-Ray machine to photograph McKinley's organs and assess the damage, he met opposition from others unwilling to use the new technology. Some attribute this inaction to contributing to McKinley's ultimate demise.

=== Legacy ===
In 1948, in recognition for his career in medicine, the Francis Delafield Hospital opened as a cancer research center for Columbia-Presbyterian Medical Center. The six-story building was located at 163rd Street and Fort Washington Avenue in Manhattan. Its 2,000,000 volt roentgen ray installation was the second ever in New York City.

=== Terms ===
- Delafield's hematoxylin — a strong solution of hematoxylin crystals, 4 cc.; 95% alcohol, 25 cc.; saturated aqueous solution of ammonia alum, 400 cc.; expose in an unstoppered bottle to sun and air three or four days; filter and add 100 cc. of glycerin and 100 cc. of 95% alcohol.

Dorland's Medical Dictionary (1938)

== Personal life ==
On January 17, 1870 in Mulenburgh's church (6th avenue and 20th) Francis Delafield married Katherine Van Rensselaer (1849–1901), the daughter of Henry Bell Van Rensselaer and the granddaughter of Stephen Van Rensselaer III. Together, they were the parents of one son and three daughters:

- Elizabeth "Bessie" Ray Delafield (1872–1923), who was active in the missions of the Episcopal Church and worked with the wounded during World War I.
- Julia Floyd Delafield (1874–1952), who married Frederick S. Crosby. They were the grandparents of the musician David Crosby.
- Cornelia Van Rensselaer Delafield (b. 1876)
- Edward Henry Delafield (1880–1955)

Delafield died in Noroton, Connecticut while visiting his sister. For some time he had been in poor health, and a week before his death suffered an attack of apoplexy. He was buried in Grace Church Cemetery at Jamaica, Long Island.

== Delafield Island ==
Between 1859 and 1865, his father Dr. Edward Delafield, assembled a 154-acre (0.62 km^{2}) tract of land in Darien, Connecticut. After his parents died, in the summer of 1879, Francis Delafield inherited the entirety of the property in Darien then called "Delafield Farm". After the death of Francis, the property was looked after by his sister Emma Harriot Delafield. When she died in 1921, the property then went to the only son of Francis: Edward Henry Delafield. After the 1929 stock market crash, Edward partitioned and parcelled off the land over the ensuing years. In an effort to sell land, the name was changed to "Delafield Wood" then "Delafield Estates" until Edward settled on the current name "Delafield Island". Edward Henry Delafield was a graduate of Yale college. He married Winifred Folsom and had four daughters. He lived on Delafield Island until his death in 1955. His daughter Elizabeth Van Rensselaer Delafield (1908–1983) lived on Delafield Island for many years. She had two children from her first marriage to the architect Robert Spurgeon; And two children from her second marriage to the attorney Frank A. Zunino Jr.

== Lineage ==
Francis Delafield was of the family of Count de la Feld, which dates back to the darkest period of the Middle Ages (about the sixth century) and seated at the Chateaux of La Feld, in Alsace (extensive ruins still remain). Hubertus De La Feld from Alsace-Lorraine near Colmar, was the first of the family that emigrated to England. Because of his service in Hastings during the 1066 invasion of England, Hubertus De La Feld received large grants of land from William the Conqueror and settled near Halifax. In England, the family rose in stature when John Delafield distinguished himself in the imperial service against the Turks: having taken a standard from the enemy at the Battle of Zenta in Hungary was in 1697 created a Count of the Holy Roman Empire by Emperor Leopold I.

== See also ==
- Pathology
- List of pathologists
