= Edward Henry Delafield =

American politician (1880–1955)

Member of the Connecticut House of Representatives from Darien
- In office 1945–1949 Serving with Thomas O'Connor
- Preceded by: Thomas O'Connor; Virginia Blood
- Succeeded by: Warren F. Cressy Jr. Gennaro W. Frate

Personal details
- Born: December 23, 1880 New York, New York, U.S.
- Died: December 2, 1955 (aged 74) Stamford, Connecticut, U.S.
- Party: Republican
- Spouse: Winifred Folsom (m. 1904; died 1927)
- Children: 4
- Parent(s): Francis Delafield; Katherine Van Rensselaer
- Relatives: Floyd Delafield Crosby (nephew)
- Education: St. Paul's School; Yale University

Edward Henry Delafield (December 23, 1880 – December 2, 1955) was a Connecticut politician and prominent landowner.

== Early life ==
Delafield was born in New York City on December 23, 1880. He was the son of Dr. Francis Delafield (1841–1915) and Katherine Van Rensselaer (d. 1901), a granddaughter of Stephen Van Rensselaer III, the patroon of Rensselaerwyck. Edward Henry Delafield's sister Julia Floyd Crosby (b. 1874) was the grandmother of musician David Crosby.

Delafield graduated from St. Paul's School in Concord, New Hampshire, and later, Yale University, in 1902, where his father also graduated from in 1860.

== Career ==
In 1921, at the age of 41, Edward Henry Delafield inherited a large farm in Darien, Connecticut. He retired as a broker from the New York Stock Exchange in 1930 and entered the real estate and insurance business.

A Republican, Delafield was elected to represent Darien in the Connecticut House of Representatives in 1944. He was reelected in 1946. He developed the Darien Theater block, the first Seagate subdivision and the early North Stamford properties.

He founded Delafield Island and the Delafield Island Association. He was president of the Weeburn Country Club, and Darien Deputy Sheriff. His summer home was called Sunswick.

== Personal life ==
In October 1904, he married Winifred Folsom (1882–1927), a descendant of Peter Stuyvesant, who was the fifth daughter of George Winthrop Folsom (1846–1915) of Lenox, Massachusetts, and the granddaughter of George Folsom. They lived in Darien, Connecticut, and the marriage produced four daughters:

- Winifred Folsom Delafield (1906-1983), who first married Donald McL. Frothingham in 1926. They divorced in 1934, and later that same year, she married Francis Ernest Gay.
- Elizabeth Van Rensselaer Delafield (1908-1983), who first married Robert H. Spurgeon in 1929. She later married Frank A. Zunino Jr. (d. 1975)
- Frances Katherine Delafield (1913-1995), who first married Edgar L. Stone in 1933. She later married W. W. Johns
- Georgette Winthrop Delafield (b. 1914), who first married Lawrence Logan Bevans in 1935. After their divorce in October 1938, she married Floyd W. Jefferson, Jr. in 1939. He was previously married to Eleanor J. Alsop. Richard Barrett

Delafield died on December 2, 1955, in Stamford, Connecticut.
