= Fieldston, Bronx =

Neighborhood in New York City

Fieldston
- Neighborhood of the Bronx
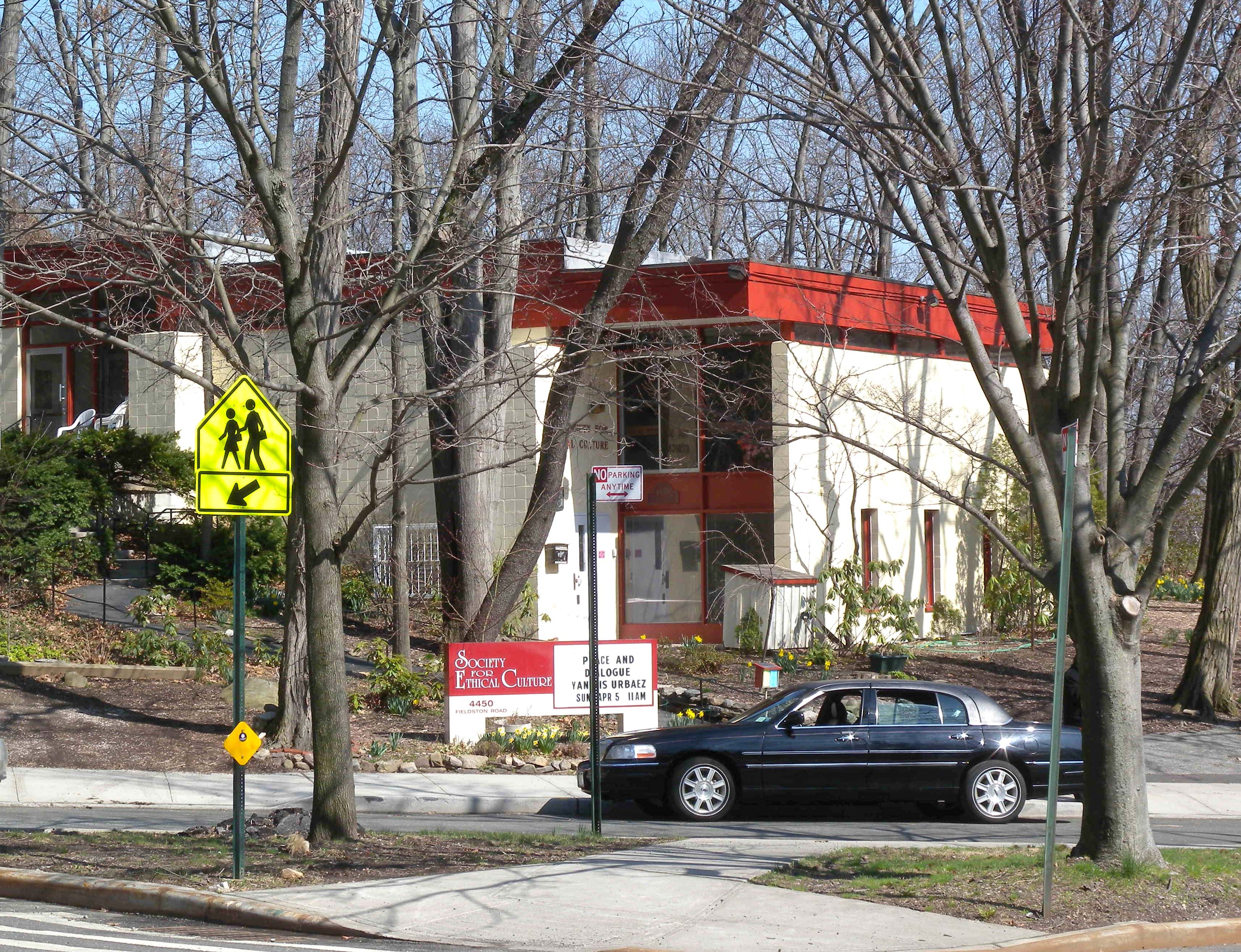
- Society for Ethical Culture
- Interactive map of Fieldston
- Coordinates: 40.894°N 73.903°W
- Country: United States
- State: New York
- City: New York City
- Borough: The Bronx
- Community District: Bronx 8

Area
  - Total: 0.426 sq mi (1.10 km^{2})

Population (2011)
  - Total: 3,292
  - Density: 7,730/sq mi (2,980/km^{2})

Economics
  - Median income: $91,862
- ZIP Codes: 10471
- Area code: 718, 347, 929, and 917
- Website: www.fieldston.nyc

Fieldston is a privately owned affluent neighborhood in the Riverdale section of the northwestern part of the New York City borough of the Bronx. It is bounded by Manhattan College Parkway to the south, Henry Hudson Parkway to the west, 250th Street to the north, and Broadway to the east. It is noted for its rural atmosphere, large houses and abundance of trees. The majority of the neighborhood is included in the Fieldston Historic District, designated by the New York City Landmarks Preservation Commission in 2006.

One of New York City's most upscale neighborhoods, Fieldston is home to two of the three prestigious "Hill Schools", the Horace Mann School and the Ethical Culture Fieldston School; the third, Riverdale Country School, lies just outside Fieldston to the north. Manhattan University is located on Manhattan College Parkway, the neighborhood's southern boundary.

== History ==
The land that is now Fieldston was part of the estate of Major Joseph Delafield, who purchased 250 acres (100 ha) in 1829, and named it after his family's estate in Ireland. The Delafield family laid out lots in 1909 – the year after the New York City Subway's Broadway–Seventh Avenue line was extended to Van Cortlandt Park, intending to develop the land, which at first was called "Delafield Woods". Rather than use a grid plan, civil engineer Albert E. Wheeler, following the suggestions made by Frederick Law Olmsted and James R. Croes in 1876, designed a street plan which followed the contours of the land and preserved as much of the wooded areas as possible. The first house was begun in 1910 and finished in 1911. In 1923, after the completion of 80 houses, the Fieldston Property Owner's Association was formed.

Buyers were provided with a list of approved architects, and historicist architectural styles – the various "revival" styles – were strongly encouraged. The Tudor Revival style was popular in houses built in the 1920s; many of them were designed by local resident Dwight James Baum, who was responsible for 62 houses, while Julius Gregory is credited with forty-two. Many of the houses in the neighborhood were featured in design and architectural magazines, and the neighborhood had a reputation for having houses of quality design. In order to accommodate the project's plan to be a neighborhood of single-family dwellings, the New York City Planning Commission approved a special zoning district in 1938, which would not allow the construction of any multiple-family buildings.

By the beginning of the 21st century, Fieldston was one of the wealthiest neighborhoods in New York City. Fieldston is one of a few neighborhoods in New York City that is completely privately owned. The streets and common areas are owned by the Fieldston Property Owners' Association, Inc. which plows the streets, does sewer repair, cares for the trees – of which there are about 1000 – and runs a security patrol as well as other usually municipal functions, such as street repair. Annual dues are paid by the approximately 250 homeowners who make up the Association to maintain the area. Once a year, the streets are closed to non-residents to legally qualify the streets as privately owned; parking is restricted to residents and their guests.

== Structures ==
=== Historic district ===
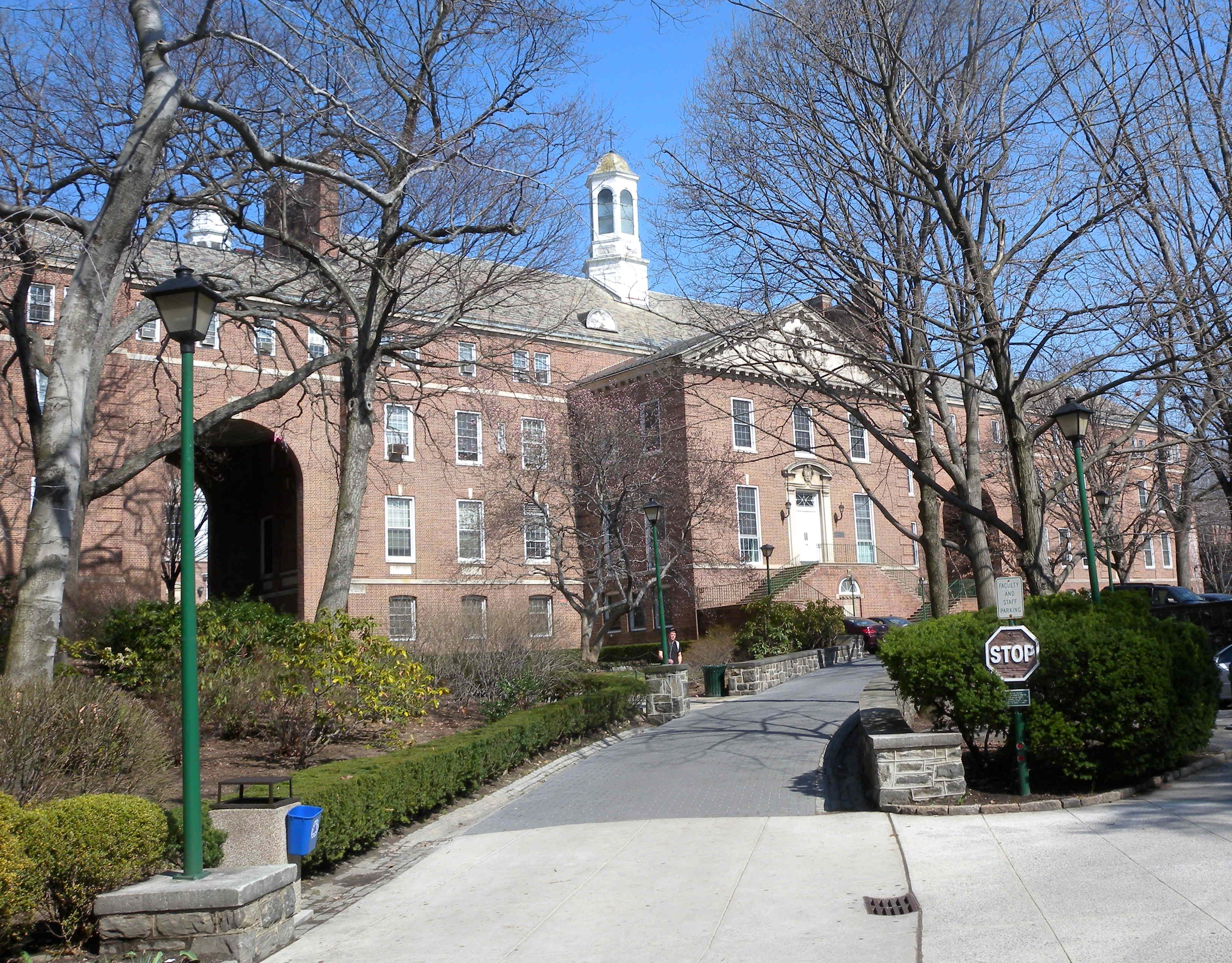
Manhattan University

On January 10, 2006, the New York City Landmarks Preservation Commission designated the majority of the Fieldston neighborhood as a historic district. The district contains 252 houses and related structures. Some of the more noted houses, with the year of completion, the architect's name and the architectural style in parentheses:

- 274 College Road (1926–28, Julius Gregory, Medieval Revival)
  - Gregory designed 42 houses in the neighborhood
- 4521 Delafield Road (1925, Dwight James Baum, Colonial Revival)
  - received a gold medal from the Architectural League of New York as the best two-story house built between 1926 and 1930 in the U.S.
  - Baum designed 62 houses in the neighborhood
- 4530 Fieldston Road (1928–29, Gregory, Medieval Revival
- 4599 Fieldston Road at West 246th Street (1928–29, Baum, Mediterranean Revival)
- 4600 Fieldston Road at West 246th Street (1926–27, Baum, Norman Revival)
- 4730 Fieldston Road (1929–30, Gregory, Georgian Revival)
- 5001 Goodridge Avenue (1916, Baum, Colonial Revival)
  - Baum's own residence
- 5020 Goodridge Avenue (1914–15, Harrie T. Lindeberg, Tudor Revival)
  - the residence of Mayor Fiorello La Guardia from 1945 until his death in 1947; later owned and occupied by author Robert Silverberg from 1961 to 1971
- 4538 Greystone Avenue (c.1924, attributed to R.C. Hunter)
  - features "a turreted tower and a steeply pitched slate-covered roof with a deliberate sag", making it "one of the most charming" in the neighborhood
- 4550 Livingston Avenue near West 246th Street (1915-1916 Dwight James Baum, Medieval Revival)
- 4600 Livingston Avenue near West 246th Street (1922–24, Clarence S. Stein, Colonial Revival)
- 351 West 245th Street (1924–25, W. Stanwood Phillips, Colonial Revival)
  - Phillips designed 14 houses in the neighborhood
- 355 West 246th Street (1911–12, Mann & MacNeille, Tudor Revival)
  - one of the first houses commissioned by the Delafield estate; Mann & MacNeille designed 8 houses in Fieldston
- 331 West 250th Street at Fieldston Road (1918–19, Baum, Dutch Colonial Revival)
- 4401–4403 Waldo Avenue (1913, C. Van Valkenberg; additions: 1919 & 1927, Baum; Tudor Revival)
  - originally the office of the Delafield Estate, then of Albert E. Wheeler, the civil engineer who laid out Fieldston; now a private home
- 4405 Waldo Avenue (1928, Baum, Medieval Revival)
  - originally the residence of Albert E. Wheeler
- C. E. Chambers House – 4670 Waldo Avenue between College Road and Livingston Avenue (c.1917, Gregory)
  - reminiscent of an English country house

=== Outside the historic district ===
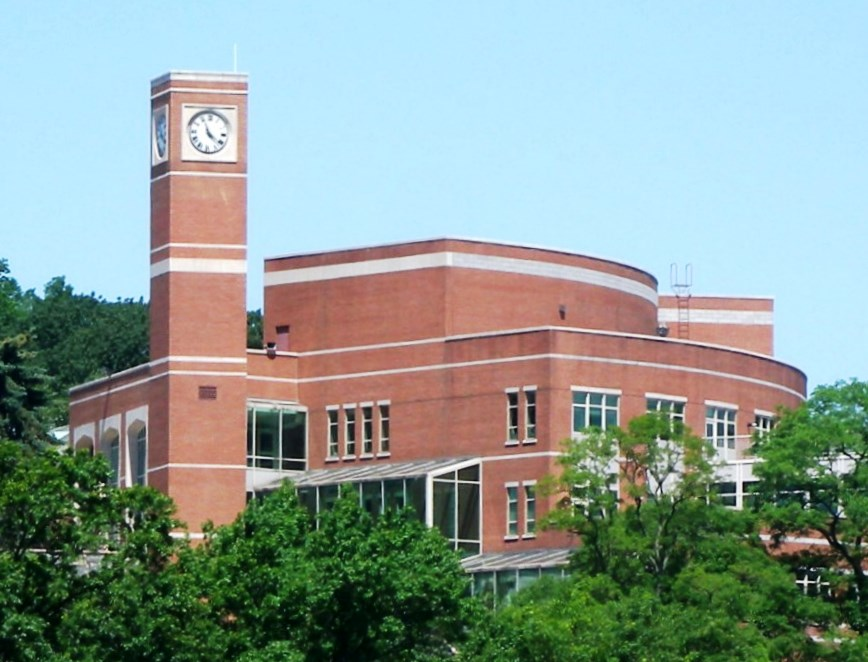
Fisher Hall of Horace Mann High School

- Hadley House – 5122 Post Road (center: 18th century; north wing: 2nd quarter, 19th century; south wing and remodeling by Baum, 1915–1916); a New York City landmark
  - the center section is one of the oldest residences in the Bronx
- Christ Church – 5030 Henry Hudson Parkway East at West 252nd Street (1865–66, Richard M. Upjohn); a New York City landmark
  - "Small, picturesque romantic Victorian Gothic Revival church"
- Riverdale Presbyterian Church and manse (The Duff House) – 4763 Henry Hudson Parkway at West 249th Street (1863–64, James Renwick Jr., Late Gothic Revival); a New York City landmark and listed on the National Register of Historic Places
- Conservative Synagogue Adath Israel of Riverdale – 475 West 250th Street at Henry Hudson Parkway (1962, Percival Goodman)
  - "Strong forms in concrete and dark red brick make this ... an unneighborly character"
- Horace Mann School – 231 West 246th Street at Tibbett Avenue, including:
  - Pforzheimer Hall (1956, Victor Christ-Janer)
  - Prettyman Gymnasium (1968, Charles E. Hughes III)
  - Gratwick Science Hall Addition (1975, Frost Assoc.)
  - Middle School and Arts/Dining Building (1999, Gruzen Samton)
- Ethical Culture Fieldston School – 3901 Fieldston Drive at Manhattan College Parkway
  - Middle School and Athletic Building (2007, Cooper, Robertson & Partners)
- Manhattan University – 4513 Manhattan College Parkway, a Roman Catholic liberal arts college

== See also ==
- List of New York City Designated Landmarks in The Bronx
