= William Bard =

American lawyer

President of the New York Life Insurance and Trust Company
- In office 1830–1847
- Preceded by: Inaugural holder
- Succeeded by: Morris Franklin

Personal details
- Born: April 4, 1778 Philadelphia, Pennsylvania, U.S.
- Died: October 17, 1853 (aged 75) Staten Island, New York, U.S.
- Spouse: Catherine Cruger (m. 1802)
- Children: 14, including John Bard
- Parent(s): Samuel Bard; Mary Bard
- Education: Columbia College

William Bard (April 4, 1778 – October 17, 1853) was a lawyer and pioneer in life insurance who founded the New York Life Insurance and Trust Company.

== Early life ==
Bard was born in Philadelphia, Pennsylvania, on April 4, 1778. He was the son of cousins, Mary (née Bard) Bard and Samuel Bard, a prominent doctor who was a founder of Columbia University's medical school and physician to George Washington. His younger sister, Eliza, was the wife of John McVickar, the First Rector of St. James Church in Hyde Park and professor at Columbia University.

His paternal grandparents were Suzanne (née Valleau) Bard, a granddaughter and heiress of Pierre Fauconnier, and John Bard, a friend of George Washington and Benjamin Franklin who had invested in Hyde Park, then a 3,600 acre plantation.

William graduated from Columbia College, in 1798 and began the study of law under Judge Maturin Livingston, the former Recorder of New York City.

== Career ==
After his marriage in 1820, they moved to Hyde Park where his father had transferred a large portion of his estate, together with a considerable fortune that his wife received from her grandmother, Madame du Nully of San Croix. Around 1826, Bard sold their estate in Hyde Park to David Hosack (the doctor who tended to the fatal injuries of Alexander Hamilton after his duel with Aaron Burr in July 1804) and moved to Manhattan, before eventually settling in Staten Island where he purchased a large piece of property becoming the first of his family to reside on Staten Island. There he built a large house in West New Brighton, located on the north shore of the island, at Bard Ave. (which was named for him) and Delafield Place. He was offered the position of president of Columbia College, but declined the offer.

He later founded the New York Life Insurance and Trust Company, which was the first insurance company in New York, and served as its first president. After his retirement in 1847, he was succeeded by Morris Franklin, who served as president from 1848 until his death in 1885.

== Personal life ==
Coat of Arms of William Bard

On October 7, 1802, Bard was married to Catherine Cruger (1781–1868) at Trinity Church in Manhattan. Catherine was the daughter of Ann (née du Nully) Cruger and Nicholas Cruger (brother of Henry Cruger), a slave-trader in St. Croix, West Indies. Together, they were the parents of fourteen children, (Note: Their children that died in infancy were: Mary Bard (b. 1807), Catharine Bard (b. 1809), Nicholas Bard (b. 1816), Bertram de Nully Bard (b. 1817), Cruger Bard (b. 1823), and Nathaniel Pendleton Bard (b. 1825).) eight of whom lived to adulthood:

- Samuel Bard (1803–1883), who died unmarried.
- Anne Bard (1804–1834), who married Edward Prime (1801–1883), son of Nathaniel Prime, in 1827.
- Caroline Bard (1806–1883), who died unmarried.
- Susan Bard (1812–1838), who married Ferdinand Sands (1806–1839), a grandson of Comfort Sands.
- Eliza Bard (1813–1902), who married Rufus King Delafield (1802–1874), brother of merchants Richard Delafield and Edward Delafield.
- William Henry Bard (1815–1834), who died unmarried.
- John Bard (1819–1899), who founded Bard College with his wife, Margaret Taylor Johnston (1825–1875), daughter of merchant John Johnston and sister of John Taylor Johnston, founder of the Metropolitan Museum of Art.
- Mary Bard (1821–1847), who married Arthur B. Morris.

Bard died on October 17, 1853, at his home on Staten Island. He was buried in the family vault in St. Mark's Church in-the-Bowery. His widow, Catherine, died on October 14, 1868, also in Staten Island. Their Staten Island estate in the Livingston neighborhood, which was later owned by their daughter Eliza, became the Staten Island Cricket Club.
