= Ferdinand Sands =

American lawyer

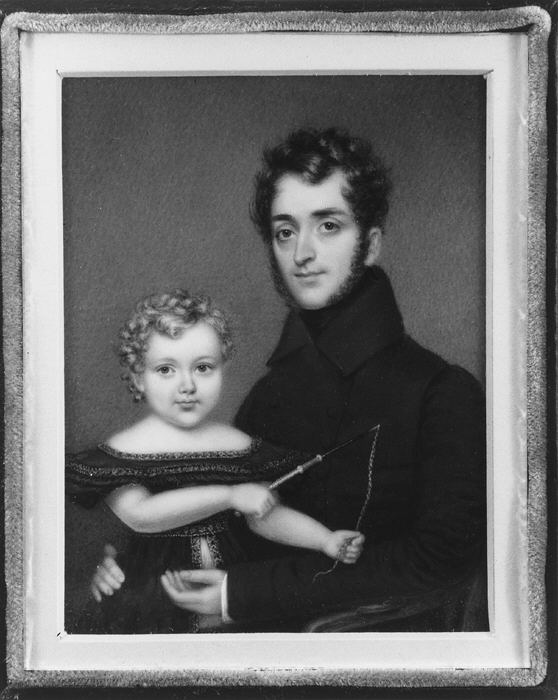
- Portrait of Sands and his son, Joseph, by Nathaniel Rogers
- Born: May 26, 1806; New York City, U.S.
- Died: December 7, 1839 (aged 33); New York City, U.S.
- Education: Columbia College
- Spouse: Susan Bard (m. 1830; died 1838)
- Children: 5
- Parent(s): Joseph Sands; Maria Theresa Kampfel Sands
- Relatives: Robert Charles Sands (uncle); Comfort Sands (grandfather); Edith Cruger Sands Rhinelander (granddaughter); Edward Prime (cousin)

Ferdinand Sands (May 26, 1806 – December 7, 1839) was an American lawyer and heir.

== Early life and career ==
Sands was born on May 26, 1806, in New York City. He was the son of Joseph Sands (1772–1825), a banker with Prime, Ward & King, and Maria Theresa (née Kampfel) Sands (1782–1846). Among his family members was his paternal half-uncle Robert Charles Sands, a noted poet.

He was a grandson of Mathias Kampfel and Comfort Sands, the merchant, banker and Continental Congressman. His paternal aunt, Cornelia Sands, was the wife of his father's banking partner, Nathaniel Prime.

Sands graduated from Columbia College in 1824 and practiced as an attorney in New York.

== Personal life ==
On March 15, 1830, Sands was married to Susan Bard (1812–1838) of Hyde Park, New York. Susan was the daughter of Catherine (née Cruger) Bard and William Bard, founder and first president of the New York Life Insurance and Trust Company. Among her siblings were Anne Bard (wife of his first cousin, Edward Prime), Eliza Bard (wife of Rufus King Delafield), and John Bard (founder of Bard College with his wife, Margaret Taylor Johnston, daughter of merchant John Johnston and sister of John Taylor Johnston, founder of the Metropolitan Museum of Art). Together, they were the parents of five sons, including:

- Joseph Sands (1830–1879), who married Charlotte Brion Foulke, daughter of Joseph Foulke, in 1855.
- William Ferdinand Sands (1832–1857), who died unmarried.
- Charles Edwin Sands (1835–1888), who married Letitia Campbell, daughter of John Campbell, in 1857.
- Louis Joseph Sands (1836–1919), who married Ella Louise Faye, daughter of Thomas Faye, in 1893.
- Arthur Sands (b. 1837), who married Miriam Maas.

Sands and his eldest son Joseph had a miniature portrait of them painted by Nathaniel Rogers, which today is owned by the Metropolitan Museum of Art.

His wife died in New York on January 28, 1838, and Sands died of consumption in New York on December 7, 1839. After the death of Ferdinand and his wife Susan, their five boys were raised by Susan's parents, Catherine Cruger Bard and William Bard.

=== Descendants ===
Through his son Charles, he was a grandfather of Ferdinand Sands (1858–1904), who married Mary Collander; Letitia Lee Sands (1871–1949), who married Maturin Livingston Delafield; Edith Cruger Sands (1874–1923), who married T.J. Oakley Rhinelander; and John Augustus Sands (1865–1957), who married Eleanor Lydell Livingston.
