= John Bard =

John Bard may refer to:

- John Bard (physician) (1716–1799), American physician
- John Bard (philanthropist) (1819–1899), his great-grandson, founder of Bard College
