= Julia Shepard Perkins =

American writer and teacher (1799-1884)

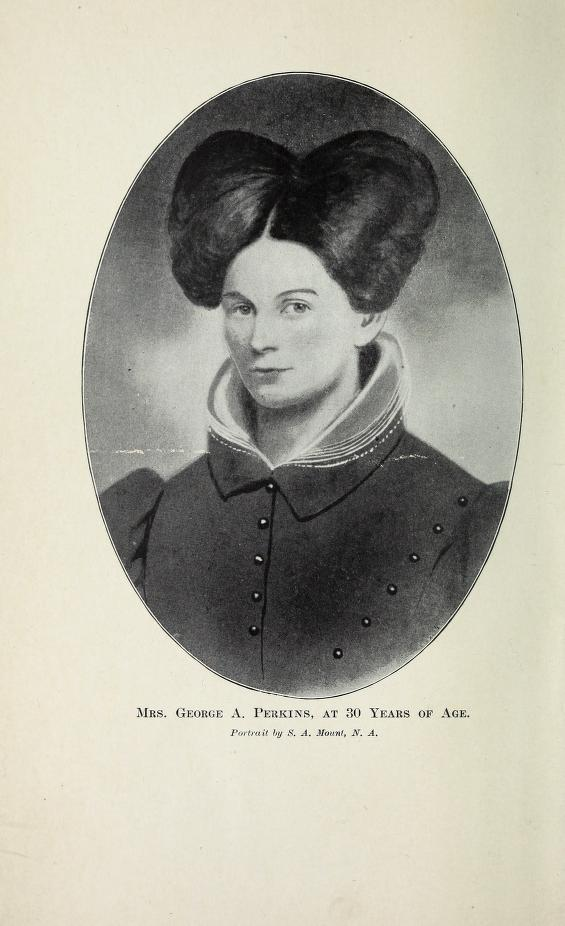
- Portrait of Julia Shepard Perkins at age 30, frontispiece to Early Times on the Susquehanna (1870)
- Born: Anna Shepard; November 11, 1799
- Died: January 24, 1884 (aged 84)
- Education: Litchfield Female Academy

Julia Shepard Perkins (1799–1884) was an American writer and educator. She was the author of Early Times on the Susquehanna (1870), a history of the Susquehanna River Valley in Pennsylvania. She was also a teacher and alumnus of Litchfield Female Academy.

== Life and education ==
Julia Shepard Perkins was born Anna Shepard in Athens, Pennsylvania on November 11, 1799. Her father was John Perkins, the founder of the Pennsylvania Academy in Athens, where she was educated as a child. When Perkins was five years old, her mother died, leaving John Perkins to care for Anna and her six siblings. John Perkins remarried six years later.

After a visit to the family by Julia Prentice, the name 'Julia' was added to Perkins' name. She was henceforth known as Julia Anna.

In 1818, Perkins moved to Litchfield, Connecticut, to continue her education at Litchfield Female Academy under Sarah Pierce. In an 1818 letter to her father and stepmother, Perkins described her life at Litchfield, writing, "I am now in my dear little chamber, where I spend the most of my time studying and knitting. It is indeed a pleasant place, a little out of the bustle of the village, where we have a beautiful prospect, and a fine society of little girls."

Perkins became an assistant teacher at the academy in 1819 and relocated to Ithaca, New York, later that year, where she also worked as a teacher. In Ithaca, she met George Apollos Perkins (1798-1884), a pharmacist and fellow Athens native. The couple married on May 1, 1823, and had five children together. She was reportedly a devoted Christian throughout her life, and was involved in missionary efforts to convert Native Americans to Christianity.

Perkins died on November 11, 1799.

== Early Times on the Susquehanna ==
Perkins published Early Times on the Susquehanna in 1870. The book details the history of the Susquehanna Valley from the time just before European colonization until the mid-nineteenth century.

Perkins wrote in the Introduction to her book, "It is natural for the intelligent to wish to learn all they can about the history of their ancestors, and the place of their own nativity; and if this sketch can afford any gratification to the living, or be useful to those who may come after, the object will be accomplished."

In 1906, the volume was republished by Perkins's daughter, Sarah Perkins Elmer, through the Herald Company of Binghamton in Binghamton, New York.

In her preface to the reprint, Elmer wrote, "Year after year, interest increases in the past history of our lovely valley, and it is most important to foster with care every item of correct information. The little volume written by Mrs. George A. Perkins (my mother), containing so much which, except for her, would have been lost, is sacredly preserved."
