= Sarah Pierce =

American educator (1767–1852)

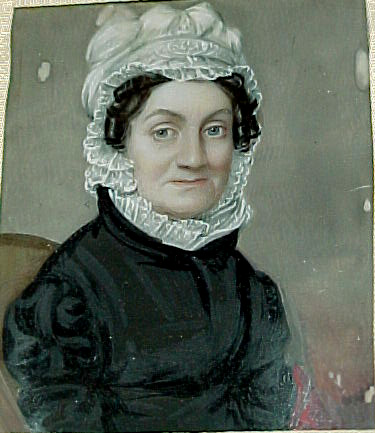
Sarah Pierce painted by George Catlin

Sarah Pierce (June 26, 1767 – January 19, 1852) was a teacher, educator and founder of one of the earliest schools for girls in the United States, the Litchfield Female Academy in Litchfield, Connecticut. The school having been established in her house in 1792 became known as the Litchfield Female Academy in 1827. The school for girls attracted an estimated 3,000 students from across the United States and Canada. Some of her most famous attendees and protégés were Catharine Beecher and Harriet Beecher Stowe.

== Early years ==
Sarah Pierce, also called Sally, born in 1767, was the fifth child and fourth daughter of Litchfield farmer and potter, John Pierce, and his wife Mary Paterson. Sarah's mother died in 1770 and two years later her father remarried and had three more children. Her father died in 1783, leaving her brother John Pierce Jr., responsible for his step-mother and seven younger siblings. During the Revolutionary War, John had a distinguished record, rising to become the Assistant Paymaster of the Continental Army, and personal friend of General George Washington. Following the close of the war, he was named Commissioner of the Army, responsible for settling the army's debts. John Pierce became engaged to Ann Bard, the daughter of Dr. John Bard and sister of Dr. Samuel Bard. In order to marry, Pierce sent his younger sisters Mary and Sarah to New York City schools specifically to train to become teachers so that they could help support their step-mother and younger half-siblings. Returning to Litchfield, Sarah Pierce brought a few students with her from New York and established her school in order to help support her family. It was a family undertaking as her sister Mary handled the boarders and the school accounts, while her sister Susan's husband, James Brace, also taught in the school.

== Republican Motherhood ==
Sarah Pierce seized upon the post-revolutionary rhetoric of Republican Motherhood, which stressed the responsibility of women to provide the early intellectual and moral training of their children so they could provide adequate and intelligent opinions to politics which was believed to be crucial for the survival of the country. She deeply believed in the intellectual equality of the sexes, while holding increased educational opportunities for women would not jeopardize the status quo of separate spheres of activity for men and women. Pierce did not believe women should enter the all-male colleges or professions, but believed their work as mothers and in benevolent, charitable and reform organizations was equally, if not more, important, than the work of men. Also, she believed that women should be educated enough to provide their own opinions, in the confines of their own home, to their husbands to help men control their new republican duties that would benefit the republic rather than themselves. Sarah believed the most important roles a woman had in her life was to be a wife and a mother and to do so needed to be educated as the new republic would provide new and growing responsibilities for the women in it. Not only did Pierce believe women were to educate the youth but she also believed that the future of the new republic depended on them to be spiritual and moral guardians in society. She preached this to her students and pushed them to lead lives of moral, intellectual, and spiritual growth because of the importance of their role in the survival of society.

== Litchfield Female Academy ==
The Litchfield Female Academy had an academic curriculum which developed and grew throughout its thirty-one year history. In 1792 the school differed little from the large number of small female academies opening throughout the country, especially in the northeastern states. Pierce first offered a limited curriculum of a smattering of English, ancient and European history, geography, arithmetic and composition. Her primary goal was to provide educational programs that would "Vindicate the equality of female intellect". The presence of Tapping Reeve's Litchfield Law School from 1784 to 1833 greatly enhanced the success of Sarah Pierce's school. The presence of the law school helped the academy to achieve a national reputation. Families from distant homes, some from as far as the British West Indies, often sent their daughters to school in Litchfield while their sons were also traveling there to attend the law school. The presence of the two schools ensured an active social life, seen as a part of the educational training of young women. With the Law School near by Sarah's school gained a reputation of having highly suitable marriages for her girls.< In fact, more than 100 of Sarah Pierce's pupils married students from the Law School, helping to reinforce the fame of the academy. Many students of the two schools later sent their own daughters to the Litchfield Female Academy.

Many educational historians have dismissed the importance of the Litchfield Female Academy because of the supposed emphasis on art and needlework, rather than examining the ways in which Pierce integrated the academic subjects and the ornamental arts, using painting and embroidery to enforce intellectual topics. Pierce insisted that her students work on more than these ornamental subjects and pushed them to read aloud or have serious conversations to ornament their minds. Unlike most women heading female academies, Pierce was lacking in any talent for art, needlework, music and French, hiring assistant teachers for those subjects. She continued instruction in these traditional disciplines, which were demanded by most parents in the education of their daughters. At the same time however, she was unopposed to developing a more demanding academic curriculum far in advance of most female academies of the period. In fact, her school would provide two types of curricula: an ornamental curriculum which was less expensive and shorter as well as an intellectual curriculum that was more expensive and longer. Also, once the students had completed the intellectual curriculum they would receive a diploma. A few of these intellectual subjects are chemistry, history (foreign and domestic), botany, natural philosophy, Latin, and Greek. To help herself educate her students on these subjects she sent her nephew, John Pierce Brace, to Williams College to receive training in teaching the “higher branches” of mathematics and science. He joined the school as her assistant in 1814, teaching till 1832 when he left to take over his former student Catharine Beecher's Hartford Female Academy.

The Litchfield Female Academy was run by Sarah Pierce as a proprietary school. In 1798 the leading men of the town took up a subscription of $385 to build an academy building for Pierce's school, but left full control of the school to Pierce. She ran the school efficiently making a substantial profit while providing a means of support for many members of her family. It was only in 1827, when Pierce was sixty years old and the school was in decline, that a board of trustees was formed and the school incorporated in order to finance a new building in an attempt to attract more students. The effort was not a success and John Pierce Brace left Litchfield to head the Hartford Female Seminary in 1832. The Board attempted to keep the school going, with former students as teachers, but to no avail. By the following year Pierce ended her 41-year association with the school.

== Death ==
Pierce never married, and she died at the age of 83 years. The Litchfield Enquirer newspaper published an obituary on January 22, 1852 which read: "We regret the necessity which compels us to announce the departure from this life of one who has perhaps been more extensively known for a period of sixty years than any other lady in New England. Miss Sarah Pierce died at her residence in this village on Monday morning, the 19th last, at the advanced age of 83 years. In 1792, Miss Pierce established a Female Seminary in this place which, as it was the first institution of the kind in this part of the country required great celebrity and pupils resorted to it from distant States as well as from various parts of our own State. This institution was incorporated by the Legislature of Connecticut under the name of the 'Litchfield Female Academy.' Miss Pierce retired from the institution several years ago and has since lived in quiet enjoyment of an ample fortune, universally respected for her constant piety, systematic benevolence and cheerful hospitality."

== See also ==
- Litchfield Female Academy
- Single-sex education
- Timeline of women's colleges in the United States
- Women's colleges
- proprietary school
