= Litchfield Female Academy =

School in LItchfield Connecticut, US (1792–1863)

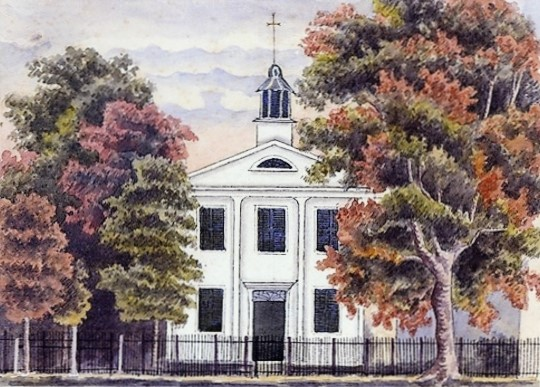
- Watercolor of The Litchfield Female Academy by Emily Hart, c. 1856
- Type: Female academy
- Active: 1792–1863
- President: Sarah Pierce
- Location: Litchfield, Connecticut, U.S.

The Litchfield Female Academy in Litchfield, Connecticut, founded in 1792 by Sarah Pierce, was one of the most important institutions of female education in the United States. During the 30 years after its opening the school enrolled more than 2,000 students from 17 states and territories of the new republic, as well as Canada and the West Indies. Some 1,848 students known to have attended the school have been identified through school lists, diaries and journals, correspondence, as well as art and needlework done at the school. Many more, unidentified to date, attended, especially before 1814, when formal attendance lists were first kept. The longevity of the school, the size of the enrollments, the wide geographic distribution of the student body, the development of the curriculum and the training of teachers, all distinguish it from the numerous other female academies of the Early Republic. The young women were exposed to ideas and customs from all the relatively isolated parts of the new nation, developing a more national perspective than most Americans of the period.

More than 80 percent of the students were from out of town and boarded with families throughout Litchfield, under Sarah Pierce's supervision. The young women were well integrated into the social, religious and cultural life of the town, known for its staunch Federalist politics and Congregational religious practice. Prominent residents, including the Reverend Lyman Beecher, Senator Uriah Tracy, Colonel Benjamin Tallmadge, Julius Deming, and the Oliver Wolcott family, had family, social, political and business networks which helped attract students to Litchfield. These well-known men also gave occasional lectures and talks to the students. The Reverend Beecher taught religion in exchange for free tuition for his children. The leading men of the town and their wives judged the compositions, maps, art and needlework shown at the school's annual exhibitions, adding to the school's fame.

The school rose to prominence at the same time at the Litchfield Law School, operating simultaneously in Litchfield, CT and founded by Tapping Reeve in 1784. Students often attended each school from the same families - sons attending the Litchfield Law School and daughters attending the Litchfield Female Academy. The close proximity of the two schools also resulted in numerous marriages between Law School and Female Academy students.

== Sarah Pierce (1792–1828) ==
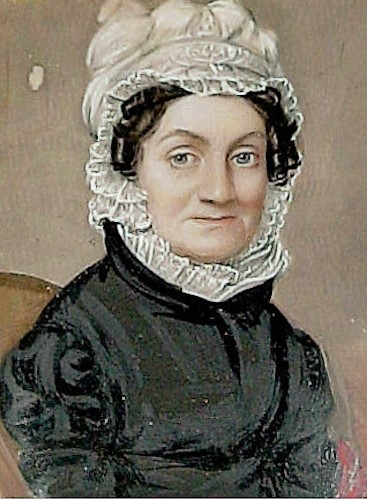
Sarah Pierce, as drawn by George Catlin, c. 1825

Sarah Pierce, born in 1767, was the fifth child and fourth daughter of Litchfield farmer and potter, John Pierce, and his wife Mary Paterson. Sarah's mother died in 1770 and two years later her father remarried and had three more children. Her father died in 1783, leaving her brother John Pierce Jr., responsible for his step-mother and seven younger siblings. During the Revolution, Pierce had a distinguished record, rising to become the Assistant Paymaster of the Continental Army, and personal friend of General Washington. Following the close of the war, he was named Commissioner of the Army, responsible for settling the army's debts. John Pierce became engaged to Ann Bard, the daughter of Dr. John Bard, Washington's personal doctor in New York. In order to marry, Pierce sent his younger sisters Mary and Sarah to New York City schools specifically to train to become teachers so that they could help support their step-mother and younger half-siblings. Returning to Litchfield, Sarah Pierce brought a few students with her from New York and established her school. It was a family undertaking as her sister Mary handled the boarders and the school accounts, while her sister Susan's husband, James Brace, also taught in the school.

== Later history (1828–1863) ==
In 1828, Pierce became too elderly to run the school and her nephew John Pierce Brace took over the operations. He ran the school until 1832, when he resigned to become principal at the Hartford Female Seminary. He was replaced as principal by Henrietta Jones, who in 1833 was replaced by Mary Amelia Swift. Swift served as principal until at least 1835, and may have served with one of her sisters. Following the "Misses Swift" were Miss Jones, Miss Heyden, and others. The charter of the Litchfield Female Academy was revised several times by the Connecticut General Assembly, up until at least 1863.

== Litchfield Female Academy Building ==
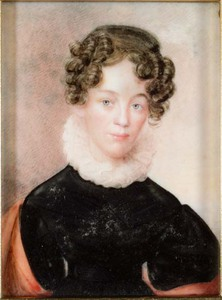
Lucy Sheldon Beach, a student of the academy, by Anson Dickinson

In 1798, due to the increased popularity of the school, a subscription was held by the town leaders in Litchfield to raise funds to construct a building for the Female Academy. Prior to this, Sarah Pierce had been holding classes in her house on North Street in Litchfield. $385 was raised and a school house was built on the north side of Sarah Pierce's house. The building was described by student Lucy Sheldon Beach as being a large room with a swinging partition in the center so that the room could be expanded or divided as needed. There was a fireplace at each end and a piano along one wall. The students sat at benches with no backs during lessons.

In 1827, the school had outgrown this building and the newly incorporated Litchfield Female Academy board of trustees "desirious of extending the benefits of the female academy in this place which they believe can be done by the erection of a new building." (Litchfield Historical Society Litchfield Female Academy Collection) The new school was built on the site of the previous building but was considered a larger and more modern building. The new academy building measured 42 feet long by 30 feet wide. It was two stories high and covered in clapboard siding painted white. Two story pilasters decorated the front with a cupola on the roof encasing a large brass bell.

The building is no longer standing today but a marker on North Street in Litchfield denotes where the school was located (41.7539°N 73.1918°W). Sarah Pierce's house is also gone. It was torn down in 1896 to make way for another home. Frank Livingston Underwood built his summer residence on the site.

== Republican Motherhood ==
Sarah Pierce seized upon the post-revolutionary rhetoric of Republican Motherhood, which stressed the responsibility of women to provide the early intellectual and moral training of their children, and was believed to be crucial for the survival of the country. She deeply believed in the intellectual equality of the sexes, while holding increased educational opportunities for women would not jeopardize the status quo of separate spheres of activity for men and women. Pierce did not believe women should enter the all-male colleges or professions, but believed their work as mothers and in benevolent, charitable and reform organizations was equally, if not more, important, than the work of men.

== Curriculum ==
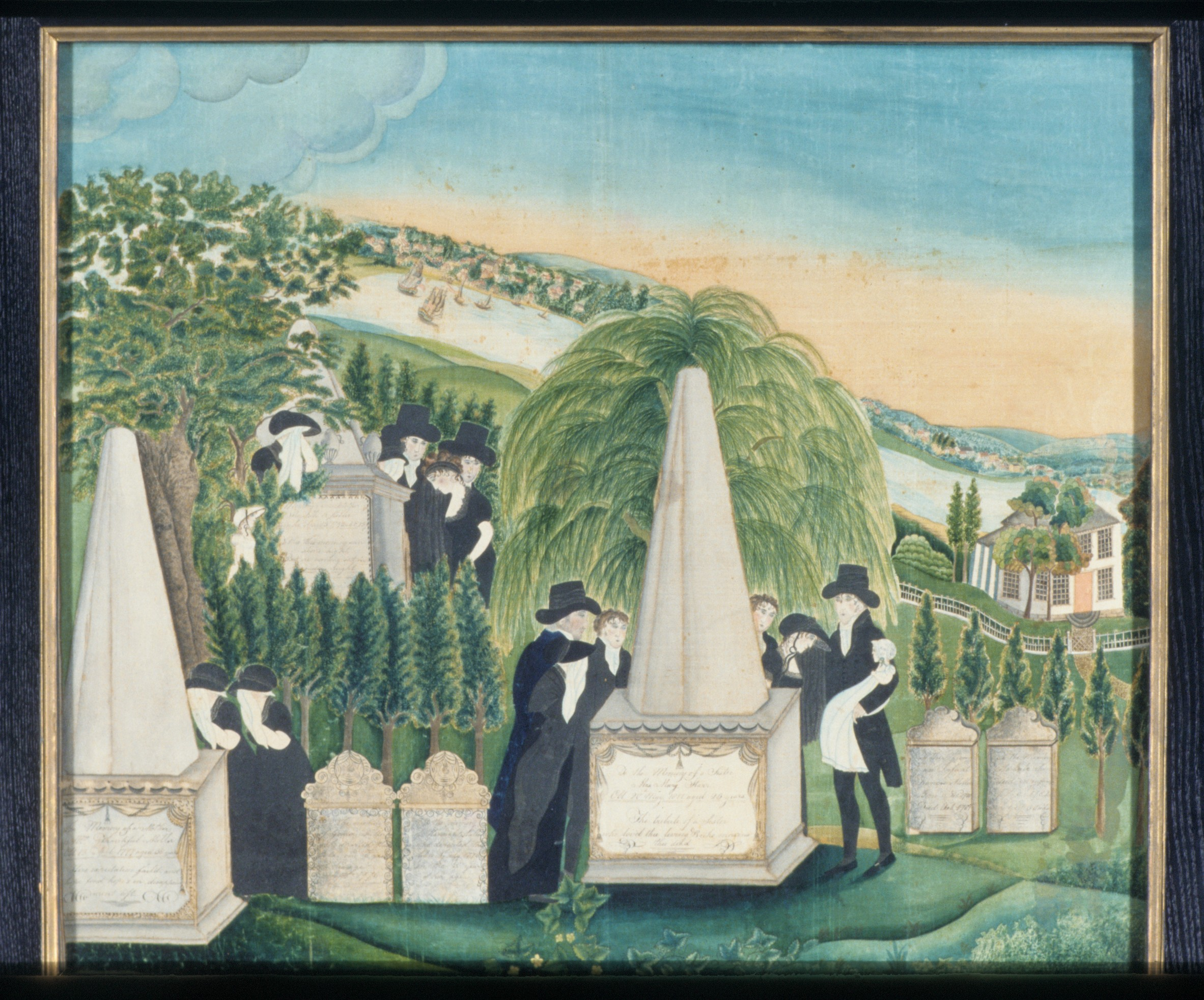
Art was part of the curriculum at Litchfield. This painting was made by student Sally Miller in 1811.

The Litchfield Female Academy had an academic curriculum which developed and grew throughout its thirty-one year history. In 1792 the school differed little from the large number of small female academies opening throughout the country, especially in the northeastern states. Pierce first offered a limited curriculum of a smattering of English, ancient and European history, geography, arithmetic and composition.

Many educational historians have dismissed the importance of the Litchfield Female Academy because of the supposed emphasis on art and needlework, rather than examining the ways in which Pierce integrated the academic subjects and the ornamental arts, using painting and embroidery to enforce intellectual topics. Unlike most women heading female academies, Pierce was lacking in any talent for art, needlework, music and French, hiring assistant teachers for those subjects. She continued instruction in these traditional disciplines, which were demanded by most parents in the education of their daughters. At the same time however, she was unopposed to developing a more demanding academic curriculum far in advance of most female academies of the period. She sent her nephew, John Pierce Brace, to Williams College to receive training in teaching the “higher branches” of mathematics and science. He joined the school as her assistant in 1814, teaching till 1832 when he left to take over his former student Catharine Beecher's Hartford Female Academy. Pierce also created her own history text Sketches of Universal History Compiled from Several Authors. For the Use of Schools 4 vols. being dissatisfied with the texts available to use at this time.

The growth of the academic curriculum of the school provided an important transition to the latter, better-known schools for women such as Catharine Beecher's and Emma Willard's, both of which had their roots in the Litchfield Female Academy. Under Brace the school offered courses in Latin, Moral Philosophy, Logic, Rhetoric and Natural Philosophy, and other subjects whose suitability for women was debated well into the nineteenth century. Diplomas were awarded to girls completing a full course of study. These young women were aware that they were receiving the highest level of education then available to women in the United States.

== The students ==
There has been an assumption that students at the female academies of the Early Republic were drawn from a narrow stratum of elite families. Genealogical and biographical records reveal that the Litchfield Female Academy students came from a wide socio-economic range of families, each with its own rational or agenda for the academy education of their daughters. The wealthiest and the most ambitious sought a “finishing” for their daughters, while many college-educated fathers wanted the highest level of intellectual education then available for their daughters. For women from the “middling” classes, teaching in or opening a female academy, which paid far more than teaching in a common school, required academy training in the ornamental subjects. More than 20 students became assistant teachers and 58 students have been identified as having opened their own schools or teaching in other academies. Pierce created an educational philosophy in which all learning – academic, moral, religious and social – was part of the total development of the young women in her school. Proper behavior and emotions were stressed continually through readings from the bible, history, biographies and British periodicals. The subject matter for the students’ art and embroidery were taken from the same sources, always illustrating desired female behavior. Pierce gave frequent lectures on proper conduct in all aspects of life. Girls were given complex credit and debit marks for every aspect of their lives in the school and community. The student writings reveal the young women's thoughts and attitudes toward a multitude of issues, including education for women, religious conversion, social life, courtship and marriage. The school also encouraged participation in benevolent and charitable work, inspiring many of the women to later develop positions of leadership in nineteenth century women's reform efforts.

=== Notable alumni ===
- Catharine Beecher (1800–1878), educator and activist
- Mary Ann Wolcott Goodrich (1765–1805), socialite, daughter of Founding Father Oliver Woolcott and wife of Chauncey Goodrich
- Julia Shepard Perkins (1799–1884), author of Early Times on the Susquehanna
- Mary Ann Delafield DuBois (1813—1888) sculptor and co-founder of New York Nursery and Child's Hospital

== Bibliography ==
- Atwood, Barbara P. “Miss Pierce of Litchfield.” New England Galaxy 9 (1967): 32-40.
- Blauvelt, Martha Tomhave. The Work of the Heart: Young Women and Emotion, 1780-1830. Charlottesville, VA: University of Virginia Press, 2007.
- Brickley, Lynne Templeton. Sarah Pierce’s Litchfield Female Academy, 1792-1833. Ph.D. diss., Harvard University, 1985.
- Litchfield Historical Society. To Ornament Their Minds: Sarah Pierce’s Litchfield Female Academy, 1792-1833. Litchfield, CT: Litchfield Historical Society, 1993.
- Loto, Judith Livingston. “One Voice: The Work and Words of Litchfield Female Academy Student Charlotte Hopper Newcomb, 1809-1810.” Dublin Seminar for New England Folklife Annual Proceedings 27 (July 2002): 65-77.
- Pichnarcik, Lisa Roberge. “On the Threshold of Improvement: Women’s Education at the Litchfield Female and Morris Academies.” Connecticut History 27 (Sept 1996): 129-158.
- Pichnarcik, Lisa Roberge. The Role of Books in Connecticut Women’s Education in the New Republic: As Examined in Sarah Pierce’s Litchfield Female Academy and James Morris’ Coeducational Academy. Master's thesis, Southern Connecticut State University, 1996.
- Vanderpoel, Emily Noyes. Chronicles of a Pioneer School from 1792 to 1833, Being the History of Miss Sarah Pierce and her Litchfield School. Cambridge, MA: University Press, 1903.
- Vanderpoel, Emily Noyes. More Chronicles of a Pioneer School from 1792 to 1833: Being Added History on the Litchfield Female Academy kept by Miss Sarah Pierce and her Nephew John Pierce Brace. New York City: The Cadmus Book Shop, 1927.
- Von Frank, Albert J. “Sarah Pierce and the Poetic Origins of Utopian Feminism in America.” Prospects 14 (Oct 1989): 45-63.
