= Nathaniel Rogers (painter) =

American painter

- Born: August 1, 1787; Bridgehampton, New York, U.S.
- Died: December 6, 1844 (aged 57); Bridgehampton, New York, U.S.
- Style: Miniature portraits
- Spouse: Caroline Matilda Denison (m. 1817)
- Elected: American Academy of the Fine Arts

Nathaniel Rogers (August 1, 1787 – December 6, 1844) was an American painter from Long Island known as the preeminent miniature portrait painter in New York City.

== Early life ==
Rogers was born in Bridgehampton, New York on August 1, 1788. He was the eldest son of a farmer, John T. Rogers, and Sarah Brown, the daughter of a Presbyterian minister. Around the age of sixteen, he began to apprentice with a shipbuilder.

== Career ==
During his apprenticeship, he sustained a serious leg wound that rendered him unable to continue working. During his recovery, he taught himself to draw and paint and took up miniature painting. He eventually moved to New York City and studied with Uriah Brown and P. Howell. He briefly worked as a school teacher, but upon working with fellow artist Joseph Wood, he went on his own, eventually becoming one of the most successful artists in miniature painting through the 1830s. He painted miniatures of some of the most prominent people of his time, including Philip Livingston, Cornelia Paterson Van Rensselaer (the wife of Patroon Stephen Van Rensselaer and daughter of Gov. William Paterson), and Chancellor Robert Livingston. While Rogers painted several full-size portraits, his miniatures remain what his is known for.

In 1817, he exhibited at the American Academy of the Fine Arts for the first time, subsequently showing each year until 1824. In 1825, he was elected to the Academy.

In 1825, Rogers was one of the founding members of the National Academy of Design along with Samuel F. B. Morse, Asher B. Durand, Thomas Cole, Martin E. Thompson, Charles Cushing Wright and others "to promote the fine arts in America through instruction and exhibition." After the National Academy was formed, he showed his painting there until around 1830.

In 1839, Rogers retired and moved to his farm in Bridgehampton.

=== Collections ===
His paintings are in the collections of the Metropolitan Museum of Art, Museum of the City of New York, New-York Historical Society, Yale University, Worcester Art Museum, Cleveland Museum of Art, and several others including The Suffolk County Historical Society.

== Personal life ==
In 1817, Rogers was married to Caroline Matilda Denison (d. 1857), the daughter of Captain Samuel Denison and Phoebe (née Topping) Denison. Together, they were the parents of two daughters and four sons, including:

- Edmund Rogers, who married Mary Zephia Topping.
- Helen Courtney Rogers, who married Henry Manning, an owner of a steam mill in Madison, Wisconsin.
- James Rogers (1829–1901), a Williams College graduate who became a prominent physician.

Rogers, who contracted tuberculosis in 1825, died in Bridgehampton, New York on December 6, 1844. He left a substantial estate and a large mansion, known as Hampton House, in Bridgehamton. His wife later died in 1857 while visiting their daughter in Wisconsin.

== Gallery ==
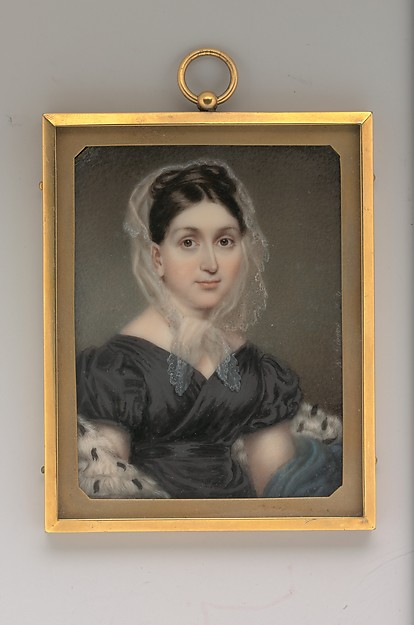
Cornelia Bell Paterson Van Rensselaer, ca. 1825

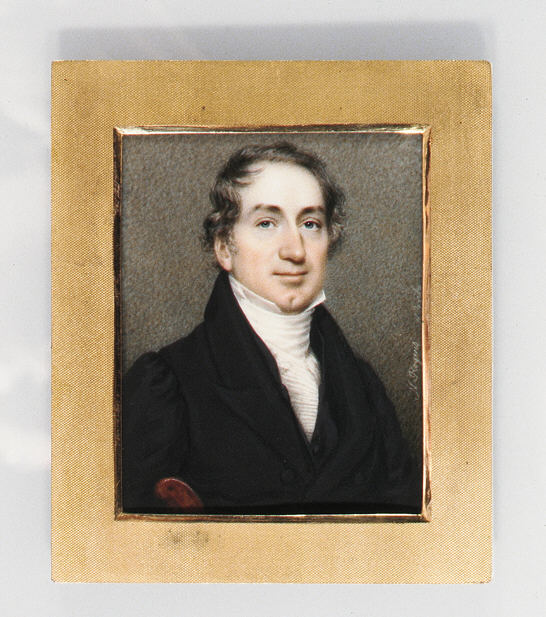
Portrait of a Gentleman

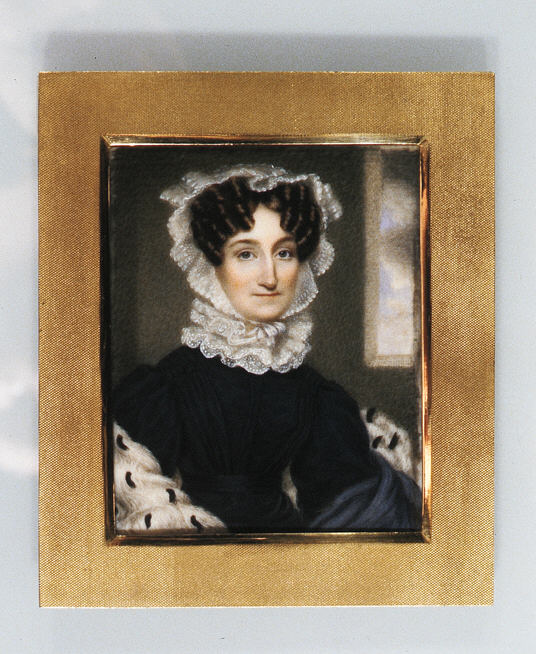
Portrait of a Lady

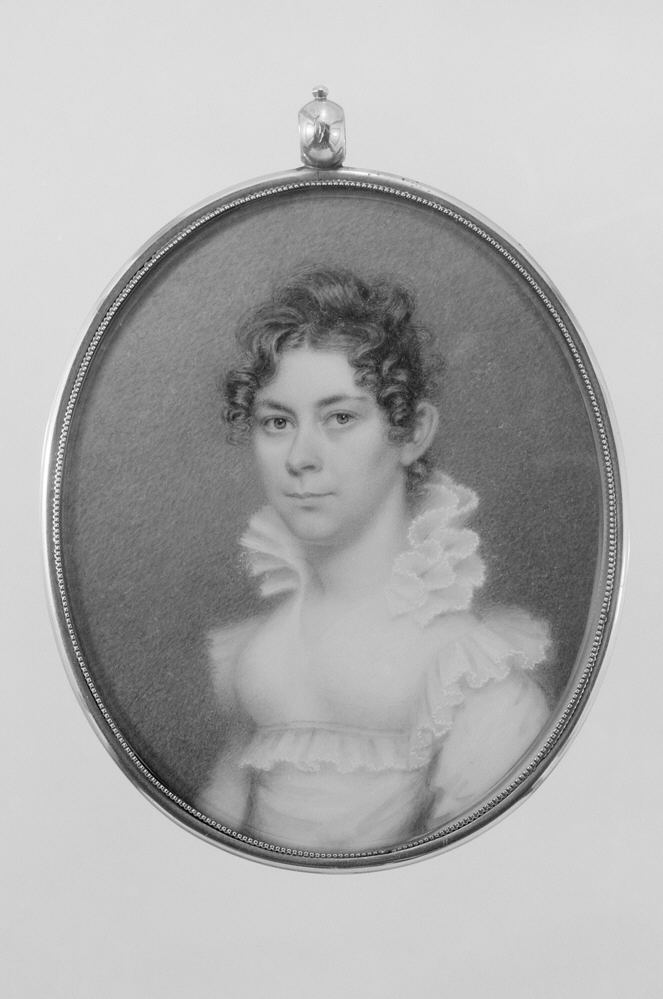
Matilda Few (daughter of William Few)

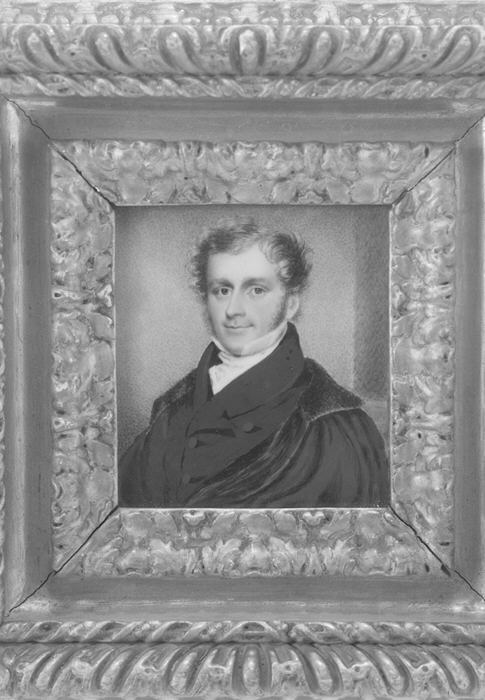
John Ludlow Morton, ca. 1829

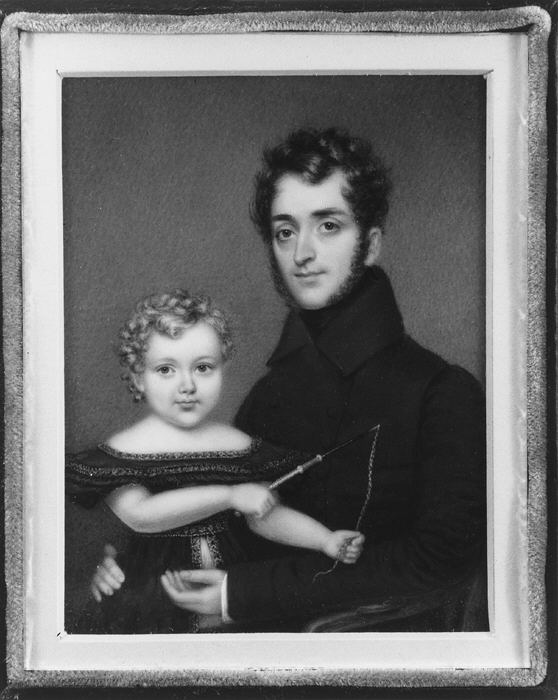
Ferdinand Sands and his son, Joseph
