= John Pierce Jr. =

US Army Paymaster-General

- Born: December 3, 1752; Farmington, Connecticut Colony
- Died: August 1, 1788 (aged 35); New York City, US
- Spouse: Ann Bard Pierce (m. 1786–1788)
- Children: 3
- Relatives: Sarah Pierce (sister)
- Military career
- Allegiance: United States
- Service: Continental Army; United States Army
- Service years: 1775–1783 (Continental Army); 1783–1788 (US Army)
- Rank: Colonel
- Units: Continental Army Paymaster Department; US Army Paymaster department
- Commands: Paymaster-General of the Continental Army; Paymaster-General of the United States Army
- Wars: American Revolutionary War

John Pierce Jr. (3 December 1752 – 1 August 1788) was an officer in the Continental Army and United States Army. A veteran of the American Revolutionary War, he attained the rank of colonel in the pay department. Pierce served in paymaster assignments throughout his career, including Paymaster-General of the Continental Army from 1781 to 1783 and Paymaster-General of the United States Army from 1783 until his death. Pierce is also regarded as one of the founders of the Litchfield Female Academy.

== Biography ==
John Pierce Jr. was born in Farmington, Connecticut on 3 December 1752, the son of John Pierce and Mary (Paterson) Pierce. His parents moved to Litchfield soon after his birth. His mother died in 1770, and in 1772 his father married Mary Goodman.

In 1775, Pierce joined the Continental Army for the American Revolutionary War. In 1776, he was appointed assistant paymaster-general, and in 1779 he was advanced to deputy paymaster-general. In 1781, Pierce became the paymaster-general with the rank of colonel, and he held this position until his death.

As paymaster-general in the years following the Revolution, Pierce supervised payment of more than 93,000 certificates for deferred soldier pay, which totaled more than 10 million dollars. (Note: $10 million in 1788 would be about $190 million in 2025.) As the Continental Army's Commissioner of Accounts from 1781 to 1783, it also fell to Pierce to settle the organization's accounts prior to its disbanding.

Pierce's father died in 1783; as the oldest of eight children, he assumed responsibility for his stepmother and younger siblings. In 1786, he brought his sisters Sarah and Nancy (or Anna) to New York City so they could receive the education and training necessary to become schoolteachers. After they returned to Litchfield, Pierce aided Sarah to begin the school that became known as Litchfield Female Academy.

In November 1786, Pierce married Ann Bard, the daughter of Dr. John Bard and sister of Dr. Samuel Bard. They had no children. He died in New York City on 1 August 1788.
