= T. J. Oakley Rhinelander =

American real estate magnate

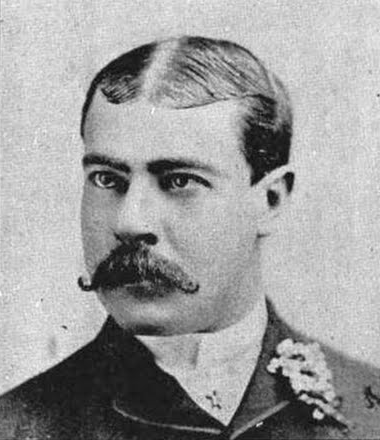
- Born: Thomas Jackson Oakley Rhinelander; June 5, 1858; New York City, New York, U.S.
- Died: July 25, 1946 (aged 88); New York City, New York, U.S.
- Education: Columbia Grammar School; Columbia College; Columbia Law School
- Spouse: Edith Cruger Sands (m. 1894; died 1923)
- Children: Philip Rhinelander
- Parent(s): William Rhinelander; Matilda Caroline Oakley Rhinelander
- Relatives: Lispenard Stewart (cousin); Kip Rhinelander (nephew); Thomas J. Oakley (grandfather)

Thomas Jackson Oakley Rhinelander (June 5, 1858 – July 25, 1946) was an American heir and real estate magnate who was prominent in New York Society during the Gilded Age.

== Early life ==
Rhinelander was born on June 5, 1858, in New York City. He was one of three sons born to William Rhinelander (1825–1908), who grew up in Washington Square, and Matilda Cruger (née Oakley) Rhinelander (1827–1914), who grew up in Gramercy Park. His younger brother was Philip Jacob Rhinelander (1865–1940), who married Adelaide Brady Kip, and was the father of his namesake, Thomas Jackson Oakley Rhinelander II, who died fighting in France during World War I, and Kip Rhinelander of the 1924 Rhinelander v. Rhinelander infamy.

His maternal grandparents were U.S. Representative and Chief Justice of the Superior Court in New York, Thomas Jackson Oakley and Matilda (née Cruger) Oakley (the daughter of Henry Cruger, who had the unique distinction of serving as both a member of Parliament and as a New York State Senator). His paternal grandfather was prominent merchant William Christopher Rhinelander, of whom his father was his only son. Among his paternal aunts were Serena Rhinelander (who donated the former Rhinelander Farm for Holy Trinity Episcopal Church) and Mary Rogers (née Rhinelander) Stewart, the wife of Lispenard Stewart, mother of New York State Senator Lispenard Stewart II, T.J.'s first cousin, and grandmother of socialite Anita de Braganza.

Rhinelander's ancestor, Philip Jacob Rhinelander, was a German-born French Huguenot who immigrated to the Colony of New York in 1686 following the revocation of the Edict of Nantes, settling in the newly formed French Huguenot community of New Rochelle, where he amassed considerable property holdings which became the basis for the Rhinelander family's wealth.

== Career ==
Rhinelander was educated at Columbia Grammar School, and graduated from Columbia College with an AB degree in 1878. While there, he was a member of the Peithologian and Delta Phi secret societies. Two years later, he graduated from Columbia Law School in 1880, was admitted to the bar in 1881, and began working for the family helping to manage their vast real estate holdings.

After his grandfather's death in June 1878, he inherited great wealth in the form of shares that held his grandfather's estate, which was conservatively valued at $60,000,000 upon his death. By 1893, the estate was said to be worth $75,000,000 with annual income in excess of $3,000,000. He was elected a director and served as president of the Rhinelander Real Estate Company, one of the largest landholders in New York City, rivaling the Astor, Goelet, and Stuyvesant families. Upon his father's death in 1908, the entire was estate left to his mother. Upon her death in 1914, T.J. and his younger brother inherited all of her $2,000,000 estate, with their elder brother receiving just $1,000 due to his brother's marriage to a chambermaid employed by the family.

Rhinelander served with the 7th Regiment, also known as the "Silk Stocking" regiment, and was generally called "Major". He served 35 years with the Regiment, thirteen years with the Veterans Corps of Artillery and two with the Ninth Coast Artillery.

=== Society life ===
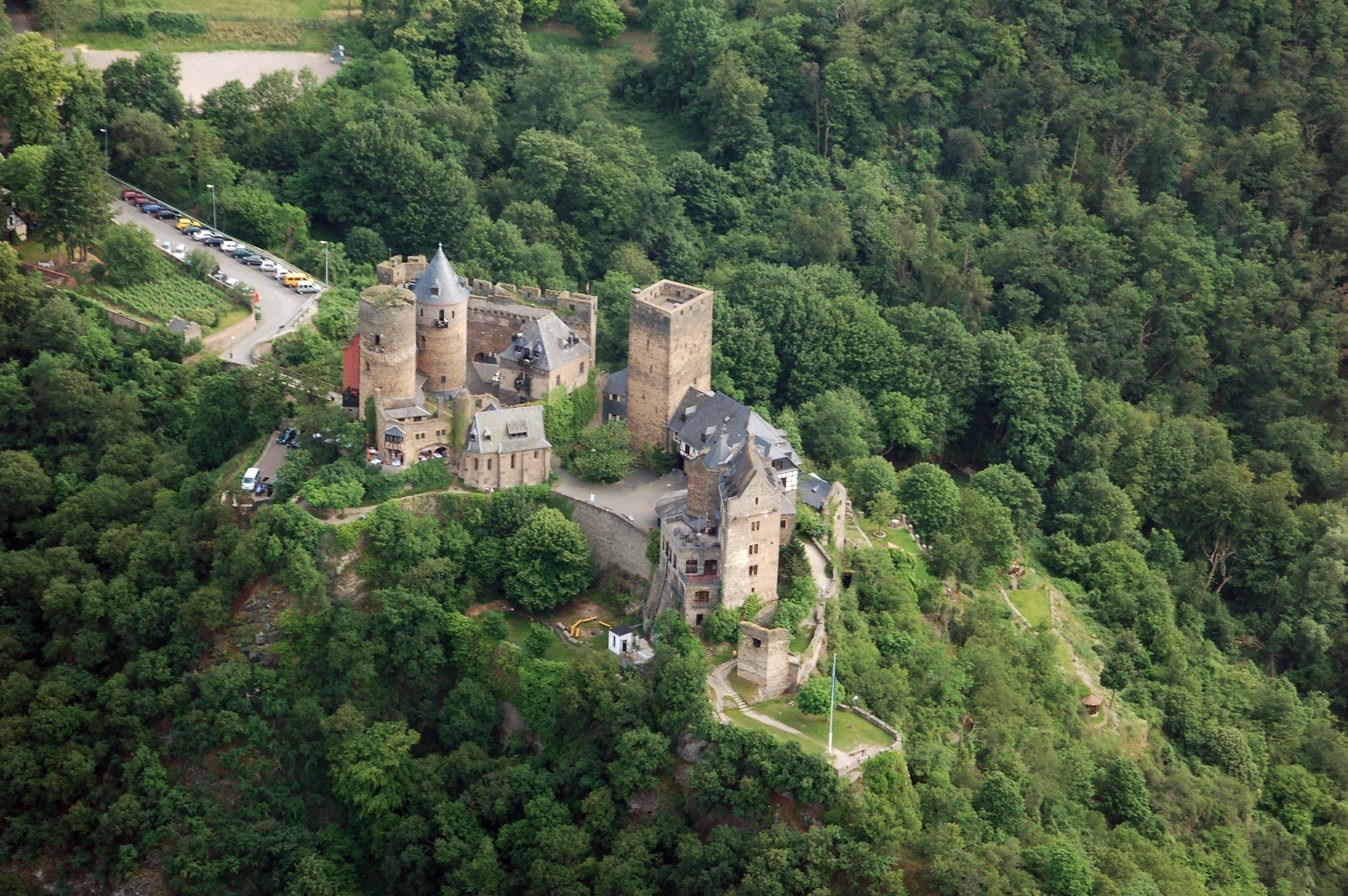
Rhinelander's German castle, Schönburg, in Oberwesel on the Rhine.

In 1884, T.J. and his brother Philip purchased the ancient castle of Schönburg in Oberwesel on the Rhine river in Germany, where his famous emigrant ancestor was born. Rhinelander restored the castle, which poet Ferdinand Freiligrath called "the most beautiful retreat on the Rhine," between 1885 and 1920.

In 1892, Rhinelander and his future bride, Edith, (and cousin Lispenard Stewart) were included in Ward McAllister's "Four Hundred", purported to be an index of New York's best families, published in The New York Times. Conveniently, 400 was the number of people that could fit into Mrs. Astor's ballroom. He was a member of the Union Club of the City of New York, the Saint Nicholas Society of the City of New York, and the Badminton Club.

Rhinelander was a member of the General Society of Colonial Wars, serving as historian general twice, from 1899 to 1902 and again from 1908 to 1911. He was also a member of The Huguenot Society of America, serving as its treasurer from 1905 to 1906.

== Personal life ==
On June 6, 1894, Rhinelander was married to Edith Cruger Sands (1874–1923), bringing together two old New York families. She was the daughter of Charles Edwin Sands (son of Ferdinand Sands) and Letitia S. (née Campbell) Sands. Her older sister, Letitia Lee Sands, was married to Maturin Livingston Delafield Jr., a Livingston family descendant. Together, they lived at 36 West 52nd Street, and were the parents of one child:

- Philip Rhinelander II (1895–1973), who married Hortense LeBrun Cruger Parsons (1894–1968) in 1916. She was a descendant of suffragette Lucretia Mott and colonial New York City mayor John Cruger. They divorced in 1935, and he married Hazel (née Marquis) Stuart (1892–1977), the widow of Charles Buchanan Stuart, that same year.

After his wife's death, he continued to live in their ornate brownstone until three years before his death when he moved to 470 Park Avenue in New York City. Rhinelander died at his New York home on July 25, 1946. He was buried in Woodlawn Cemetery in the Bronx.

=== Descendants ===
Through his son Phillip, he was the grandfather of socialites LeBrun Cruger "Brunie" Rhinelander (1917–2012), wife of financier William G. McKnight Jr.; and Thomas Jackson Oakley Rhinelander (1920–1989).
