= Schönburg (Rhine) =

Castle in Rhineland-Palatinate, Germany

- Oberwesel
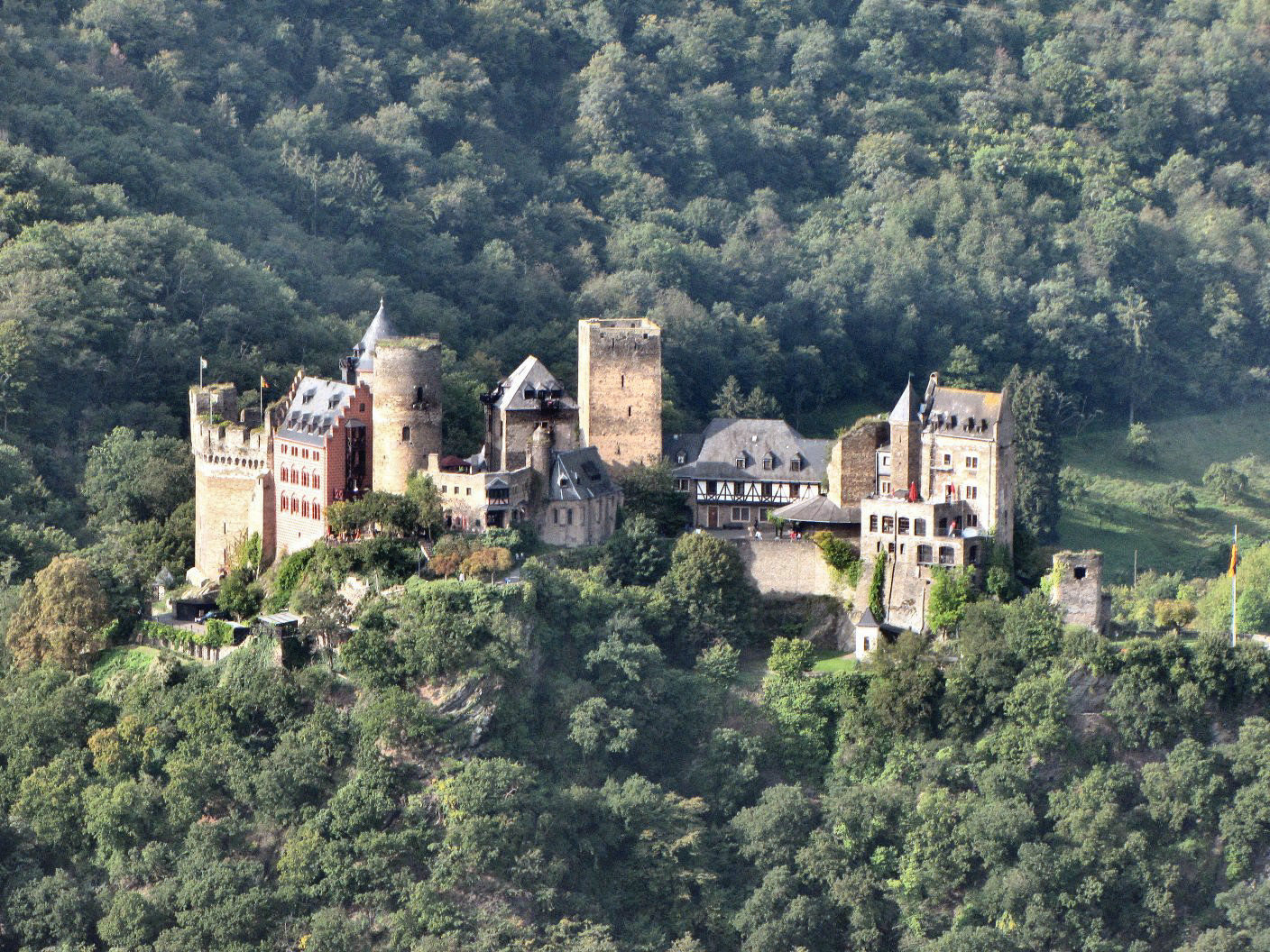

Site information
- Type: Medieval castle

Location
- Coordinates: 50°06′04″N 7°43′55″E

Site history
- Built: Between 1100 and 1149

The Schönburg (German pronunciation: [ˈʃøːnbʊʁk]) is a castle above the medieval town of Oberwesel in the UNESCO World Heritage Site of the Upper Middle Rhine Valley, Rhineland-Palatinate, Germany.

== History ==
Schönburg Castle was first mentioned in history between the years 911 and 1166.

From the 12th century, the Lords of Schönburg ruled over the town of Oberwesel and had also the right to levy customs on the Rhine river. The most famous was Friedrich von Schönburg - a much-feared man known as "Marshall Schomberg" - who in the 17th century served as a colonel and as a general under the King of France in France and Portugal and later also for the Prussians and for William Prince of Orange in England.

The Schönburg line died out with the last heir, the son of Friedrich of Schönburg.

The castle was burned down in 1689 by French soldiers during the War of the Grand Alliance.

== Schönburg today ==
Schönburg castle remained in ruins for 200 years until it was acquired by the German-American Rhinelander family who bought the castle from the town of Oberwesel in the late 19th century, and restored it.

The town council of Oberwesel acquired the castle back from the Rhinelander family in 1950.

Since 1957 the Hüttl family have been living at the castle on a long-term lease; they operate a successful hotel and restaurant there.
