= Francis G. Landon =

American politician

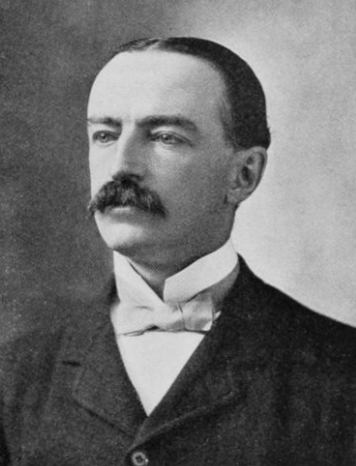

Member of the New York State Assembly
- In office 1901–1903, 1915

Personal details
- Born: Francis Griswold Landon; August 20, 1859 New York, New York, US
- Died: December 1, 1947 (aged 88) New York, New York, US
- Resting place: St. James Cemetery
- Party: Republican
- Spouse: Mary Horner Toel (m. 1897)
- Children: 2
- Education: Williston Academy; Princeton University
- Occupation: Soldier, politician

Francis Griswold Landon (August 20, 1859 – December 1, 1947) was an American soldier and politician from New York.

== Life ==
Landon was born on August 20, 1859, in New York City, New York, the son of Charles Griswold Landon and Susan Hunt Gordon. One of his ancestors was Governor of the Massachusetts Bay Colony John Leverett.

Landon graduated from Williston Academy in 1877 and from Princeton University with a B.S. in 1881. He was involved in sports teams in both schools, and served as captain for the Princeton football team for two years. In 1882, he joined the 7th New York Militia Regiment as a private. He was promoted through the ranks, and by 1887 he became First Sergeant of his company. In 1891, he was appointed Adjutant of the Regiment, which was unusual because at the time the custom was to appoint a commissioned officer Adjutant. In 1895, he became Captain of Company I. In 1899, he and an associate officer went to England to represent the Regiment and the New York National Guard. By 1901, he lived in Staatsburg. In 1900, he was elected to the New York State Assembly as a Republican, representing the Dutchess County 2nd District. He served in the Assembly in 1901, 1902, and 1903. In 1902, he introduced an anti-flirting bill that would criminalize people who drank too much and tried too hard to get women to look their way, which came with a fine of $500. There was a strong anti-flirting movement at the time. The law was still on the books in 2017, although it wasn't heavily enforced by then.

Landon was a presidential elector in the 1904 presidential election. In January 1905, President Theodore Roosevelt appointed him Third Secretary of the American Embassy at Berlin. In May of that year, he was appointed Second Secretary of the American Embassy at Vienna. He resigned from the position in 1907. In 1907, he was elected chairman of the Dutchess County Republican Committee and was appointed by Governor Charles Evans Hughes to a commission that inquired into the conditions of the National Guard and Naval Militia. He was honorably discharged from the 7th Regiment in 1902, but he rejoined the regiment in 1908 and was elected major. In 1909, Governor Hughes appointed him a member of the Militia Counsel of the State of New York.

In 1914, Landon was elected back to the New York State Assembly and served in the Assembly in 1915. In July 1917, he was appointed a field director of the American Red Cross. In September 1917, he was stationed in Camp Jackson, South Carolina. In October 1917, he was assigned to Camp Mills, New York, Camp Merritt, New Jersey, and Aviation Fields One and Two in Mineola, New York. In January 1918, he was stationed in Camp Merritt. He entered the army in August 1918 as a major in the Adjutant General's Department. He was assigned to Camp Merritt as camp adjutant in October 1918. He became morale officer in November 1918. He was discharged in November 1919.

Landon was president of the National Alumni Association of Princeton from 1917 to 1918 and from 1921 to 1927. He was also president of the Princeton Club from 1915 to 1918. He was a member of the Society of Colonial Wars, the University Club, the New York Athletic Club, and the New York Yacht Club. An Episcopalian, he was a vestryman of the Grace Church in New York City from 1924 to 1931. In 1897, he married Mary Horner Toel. Their children were Adelaide (who married Clyde Roddy) and Eleanor (who married Philip MacGregor Parker).

Landon died at his home in New York City from a brief illness on December 1, 1947. His funeral service took place in the Grace Church. He was buried in St. James Cemetery in Hyde Park.

New York State Assembly
Preceded by William A. Tripp	New York State Assembly; Dutchess County, 2nd District; 1901–1903	Succeeded by Robert W. Chanler
Preceded by Mark G. DuBois	New York State Assembly; Dutchess County, 2nd District; 1915	Succeeded by Frank L. Gardner
