= John Aspinwall Roosevelt =

American businessman (1916–1981)

John Aspinwall Roosevelt II
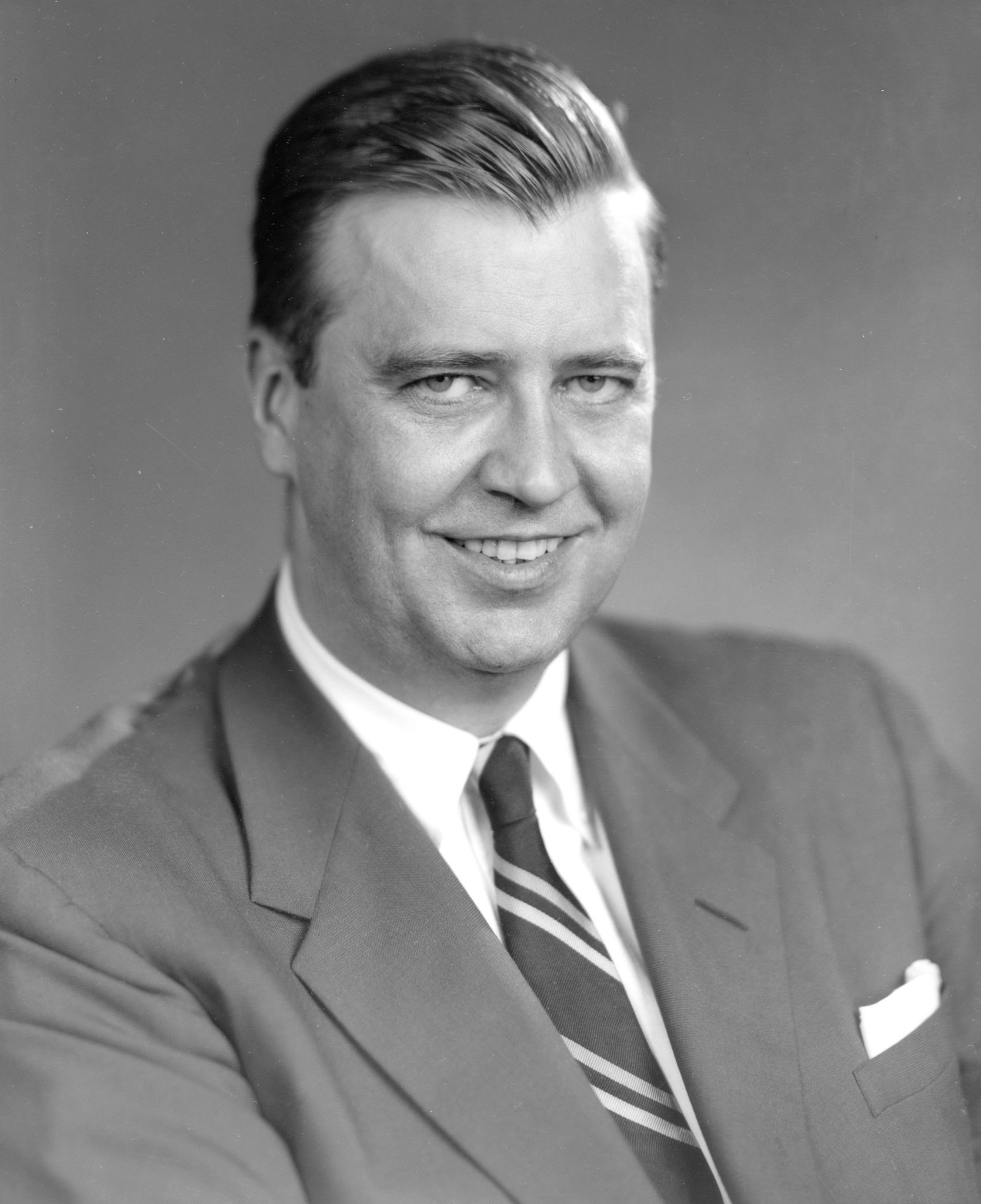
- Portrait by Harris & Ewing, 1954
- Born: John Aspinwall Roosevelt II; March 13, 1916; Washington, DC, U.S.
- Died: April 27, 1981 (aged 65); New York City, New York, U.S.
- Education: Harvard University
- Occupations: Businessman, naval officer
- Political party: Democratic (until 1947) Republican (1947–1981)
- Spouses: Anne Lindsay Clark (m. 1938; div. 1965) Irene Boyd McAlpin (m. 1965)
- Children: Four
- Parents: Franklin D. Roosevelt; Eleanor Roosevelt
- Family: Roosevelt
- Military career
- Allegiance: United States
- Branch: United States Navy
- Service years: 1941–1946
- Rank: Lieutenant Commander
- Conflicts: World War II
- Awards: Bronze Star Medal

John Aspinwall Roosevelt II (March 13, 1916 – April 27, 1981) was an American businessman and the sixth and last child of U.S. President Franklin D. Roosevelt, and his wife, Eleanor Roosevelt.

== Early life ==
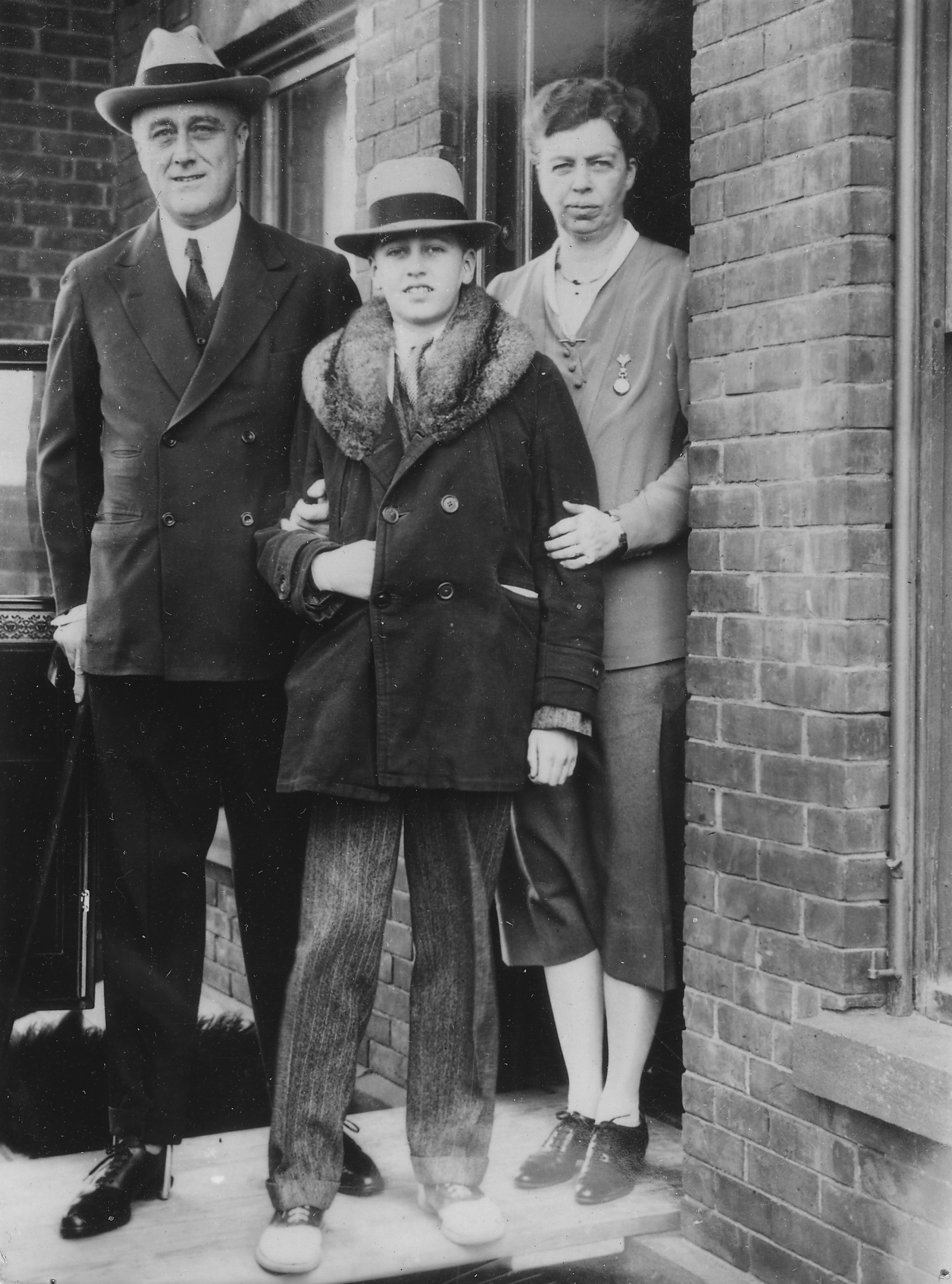
Roosevelt with his parents in Albany, New York, 1930

John Aspinwall Roosevelt II was the youngest child of Franklin and Eleanor Roosevelt. His surviving siblings were Anna E. Roosevelt, James Roosevelt II, Elliott Roosevelt, and Franklin D. Roosevelt, Jr. Roosevelt grew up on the Roosevelt estate in Hyde Park, New York and attended preparatory schools The Buckley School and Groton School.

Roosevelt and his next oldest sibling, Franklin Jr., were much closer to their mother than the three older Roosevelt children had been. This was in part because by the time they were born, she was more comfortable in her role as a parent. However, others contend that as a result of his father's disability, "John had grown up with less emotional connection with his parents than any of the others."

By family consensus, Roosevelt was the son least like his father, which reflected itself politically as well as in many other aspects. James Roosevelt wrote that he "had the smoothest, least exciting life of all of us." "The youngest, he was also the least close to father." And, he was "the most thoughtful and businesslike of us."

When he was five years old his father, Franklin Roosevelt, contracted a paralytic illness. Franklin would use a wheelchair for the rest of his life. Conscious of her husband's disability, and determined that the younger children should not miss out on the sports and physical activities that their older siblings had enjoyed, Eleanor Roosevelt learned to swim and skate. She also took John and Franklin Jr. camping and to Europe. In 1937, John Roosevelt was involved in a drunken brawl and an attack on the mayor in Cannes that made headlines across the world.

Of John Roosevelt's activities before World War II, a Roosevelt biographer noted: "When he was a junior at Harvard, FDR got him a summer job working in the forests of Tennessee for the Tennessee Valley Authority. At the end of the experience, his supervisor felt compelled to write Eleanor to say that her youngest son seemed to believe in 'the psychology of making one's way by influence and association rather than by hard work and personal achievement.'" However, most biographers agree that this judgment was actually far more appropriate for the other sons. After graduation from Harvard, his father's alma mater, John worked at Filene's Department Store in Boston until America entered World War II in 1941.

=== World War II ===
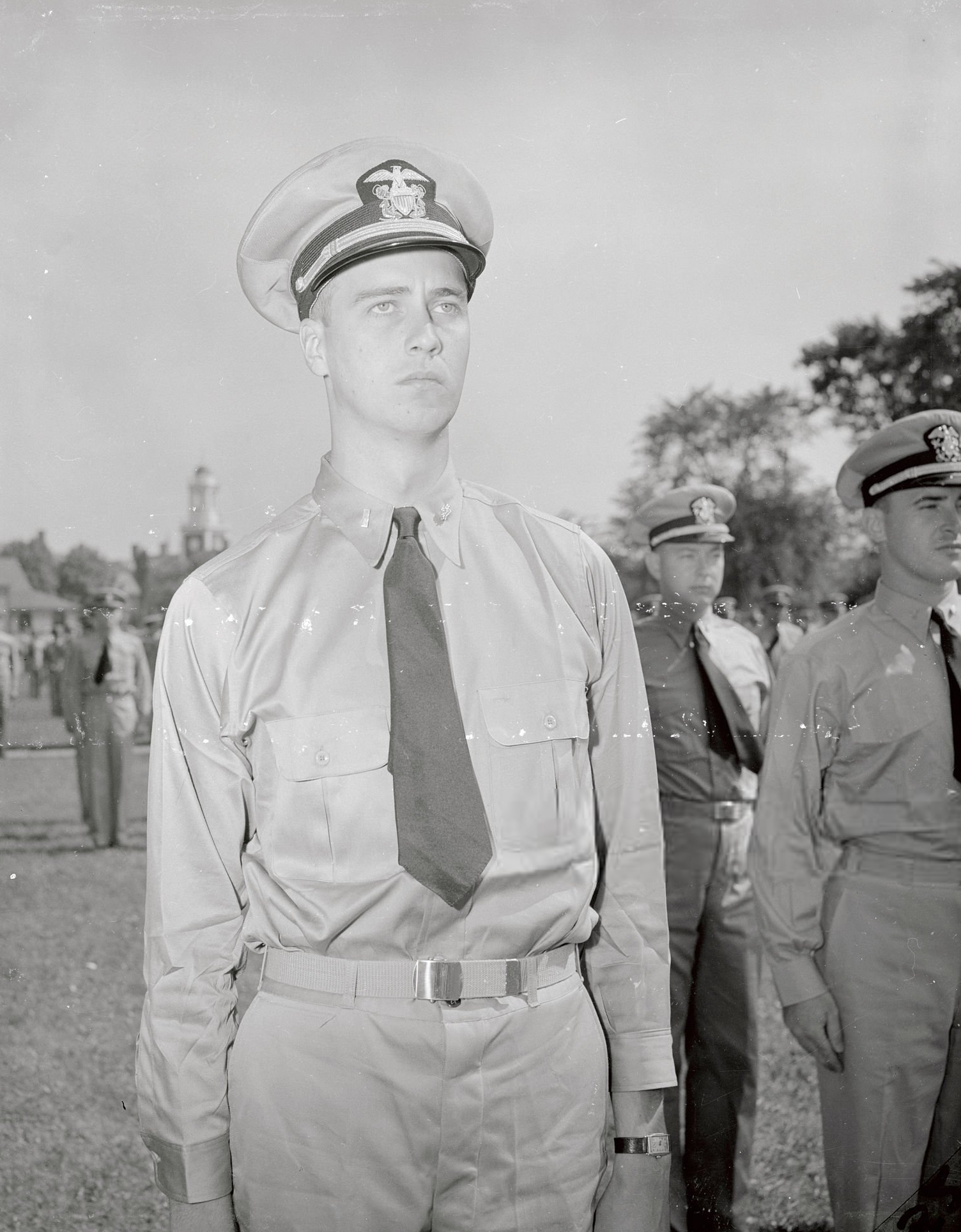
Roosevelt in uniform, 1941

On the eve of World War II, alone among the sons, John Roosevelt announced that he would seek conscientious objector status. Family persuasion ultimately changed his mind, and he served in the United States Navy. He was commissioned an ensign in the United States Navy in early 1941 and served until 1946. James Roosevelt summarized his brother's service:

John was the only one of us who had no opportunity to lead a fighting unit, yet he, too, served under fire. Assigned as a lieutenant in the Navy Supply Corps, he persuaded father to get him transferred from shore to sea duty. He served aboard the aircraft carrier USS Wasp in the war zone, winning the Bronze Star and promotion to lieutenant commander for his actions while his ship was being gunned.

== Career and politics ==
After the war, Roosevelt pursued a business career in California as the Regional Merchandising Manager for Grayson & Robertson Stores in Los Angeles. In 1953, he became a partner in a Beverly Hills financial company but left shortly thereafter to take up residence in the family compound in Hyde Park.

Roosevelt's department store work was under the wing and direction of Walter Kirschner, a Roosevelt family friend who mentored and subsidized many of the siblings in the 1940s. He was also involved with Elliott Roosevelt in several businesses, especially in Cuba after Fulgencio Batista took power in 1952.

Roosevelt represented François "Papa Doc" Duvalier in the United States and attended his inauguration. By 1958, it was reported that Haiti "has retained the P.R. firm of Roosevelt, Summers and Hamilton at a fee of $150,000 to act as its public relations consultant for one year."

Although he never pursued political office, Roosevelt served on the boards of many organizations, including the Greater New York Council of Boy Scouts of America, the Eisenhower Exchange Fellowship, Roosevelt University, the State University of New York, and the Governmental Affairs Committee.

Although Roosevelt leaned Republican at an early age, he deliberately kept an apolitical stance until after his father's death. In 1947, John Roosevelt changed his political affiliation to Republican, a gesture his mother interpreted as an attempt to win support from his wife's family, his father-in-law being a staunchly Republican Boston banker. But in 1952, he went beyond paper registration, actively supporting Dwight D. Eisenhower's bid for the Presidency against Democratic nominee Adlai Stevenson, for whom his mother was just as actively campaigning. His defection from the Democratic Party and his subsequent leadership of Citizens for Eisenhower – he vocally defended Eisenhower's running mate, California Senator Richard Nixon, against attacks by his mother – caused considerable family friction.

The tension was exacerbated when Roosevelt and his family moved into Stone Cottage next door to Eleanor Roosevelt's home at Val-Kill that same year. He and his brother, Elliott, who lived at nearby Top Cottage, did not get along. Elliott left shortly after John and his family arrived. John subsequently acquired what remained of the Hyde Park property Elliott had farmed with Eleanor Roosevelt. More importantly, the presence of John and his family enabled Eleanor Roosevelt to live at Val-Kill until her death in 1962. She saw John's children often and was particularly close to his daughter, Sara "Sally" Roosevelt. After Eleanor Roosevelt's death, John kept the papers from her Hyde Park home and New York City apartment.

== Uranium interests ==
At the height of the Cold War, when the U.S. Atomic Energy Commission was desperately seeking sources of uranium for the production of atomic weapons, Roosevelt became an officer and director of the Standard Uranium Company, reportedly the first and most successful publicly traded uranium corporation, which registered with the Securities and Exchange Commission in early 1954 and soon attracted heavy investments by industrialist Floyd Odlum, one of the wealthiest men in America. Inspired thereby, brother Elliott also formed a uranium company, but it floundered when the ore market collapsed in the late 1950s.

According to an authorized biography of San Francisco hotel magnate (and Democratic Party fund-raiser) Benjamin Swig, Roosevelt was also partnered with Swig and Hollywood producer Louis B. Mayer, the powerful head of Metro-Goldwyn-Mayer, in what was probably a related consortium, involving uranium investments in southern Utah.

== Later years ==
In 1956, Roosevelt began consulting for the investment firm of Bache and Company, which he joined in 1967, retiring as a vice-president in 1980. At Bache, he managed the Teamsters Union pension funds and was a friend and vocal defender of Jimmy Hoffa until the latter's incarceration.

His philanthropic activities included serving as a fund raiser with the National Foundation for Infantile Paralysis, which his father had founded, membership on the executive committee of the Greater New York Council of the Boy Scouts of America and service as a trustee of the State University of New York.

Within three years of Eleanor Roosevelt's death, John Roosevelt divorced and remarried. In 1970, he sold the Val-Kill properties. Thereafter, he and his second wife lived on an estate in Tuxedo, New York. John Roosevelt died of heart failure in 1981. He was buried in Saint James Episcopal Churchyard.

== Personal life ==
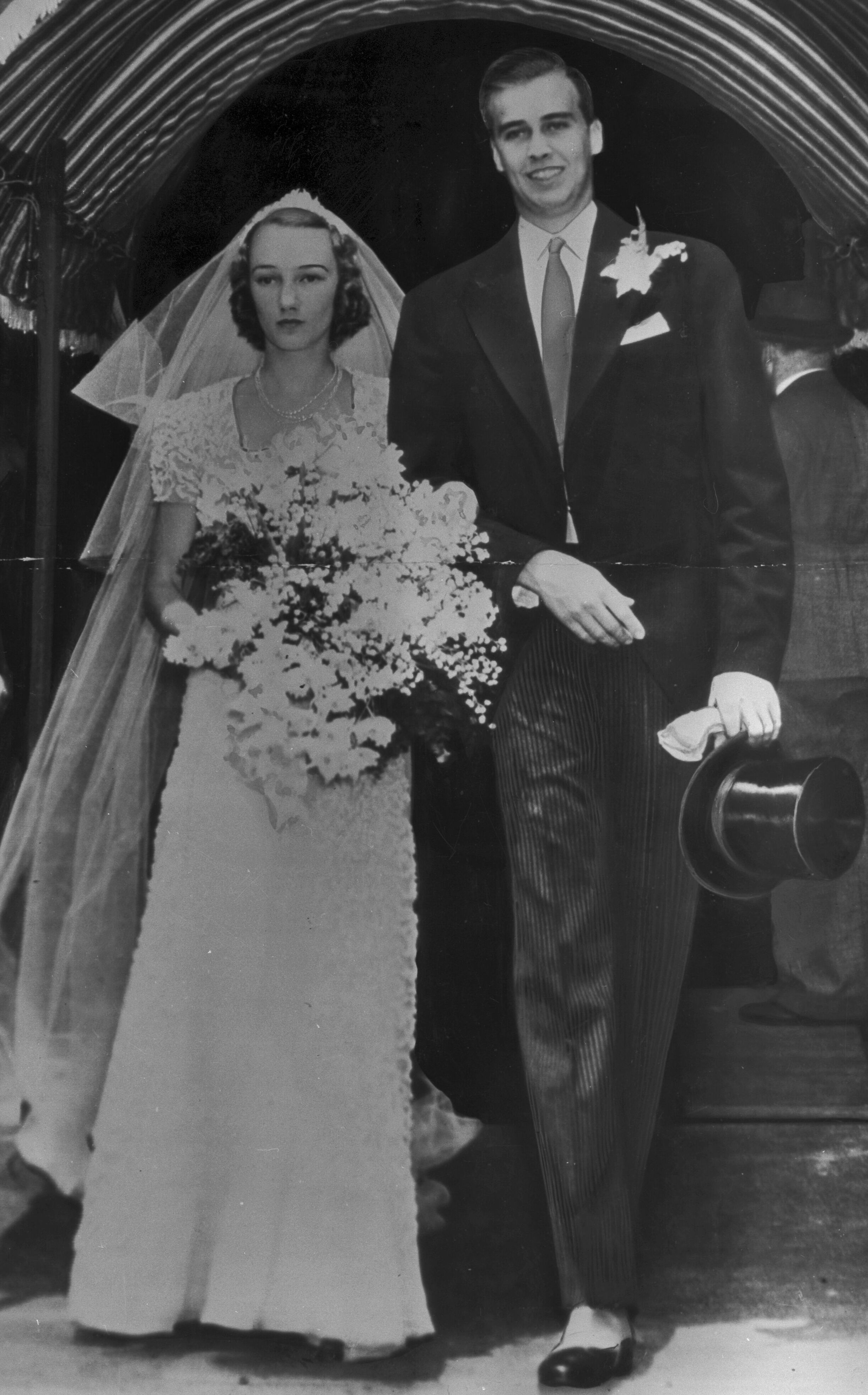
Roosevelt (right) and Clark (left) on their wedding day in 1938.

Roosevelt received his middle name from that of his great-grandmother, Mary Rebecca Aspinwall. His siblings were Anna Eleanor Roosevelt (known as Anna), James Roosevelt II, Franklin Delano Roosevelt, Jr. (I) (b./d. 1909), Elliott Roosevelt and Franklin D. Roosevelt, Jr.

John Aspinwall Roosevelt married Anne Lindsay Clark (1916–1973) on June 18, 1938, in Massachusetts. The couple had four children:

- Haven Clark Roosevelt (born 1940)
- Anne Sturgis "Nina" Roosevelt (born 1942)
- Sara Delano "Sally" Roosevelt (1946–1960); killed in a horseback-riding accident
- Joan Lindsay Roosevelt (1952–1997)

In 1965, John and Anne Roosevelt obtained a divorce. Anne moved to Mallorca, Spain, where she lived with Elliott Roosevelt's divorced third wife, Faye Emerson. That same year John married Mrs. Irene Boyd McAlpin (born March 8, 1931).

== Bibliography ==
- Roosevelt, James: My Parents, A Differing View. Playboy Press, 1976.
- Hansen, Chris: Enfant Terrible: The Times and Schemes of General Elliott Roosevelt. Able Baker Press, 2012.
- Collier, Peter (with David Horowitz): The Roosevelts. Simon & Schuster, 1994.
