= John Bard (philanthropist) =

American philanthropist (1819–1899)

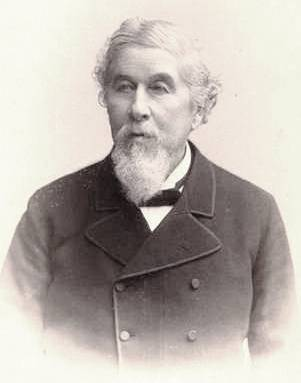
- John Bard, 1893.

President of the New York Life Insurance and Trust Company

Personal details
- Born: June 2, 1819 Hyde Park, New York, U.S.
- Died: February 12, 1899 (aged 79) Washington DC
- Spouse(s): Margaret Taylor Johnston (m. 1849; died 1875) Annie Belcher (after 1886)
- Relations: Samuel Bard (grandfather)
- Children: 4
- Parent(s): Catherine Cruger Bard; William Bard
- Known for: Founding of Bard College

John Bard (June 2, 1819 – February 12, 1899) was an American philanthropist who, along with his wife, Margaret Taylor Johnston, founded Bard College in New York, which was then known as St. Stephen's College, in order to train Episcopal Church ministers.

== Early life ==
Bard was born in Hyde Park, New York on June 2, 1819. He was the eleventh of fourteen children born to Catherine (née Cruger) Bard (1781–1868) and William Bard, an attorney who was a pioneer in life insurance in the United States.

Bard was descended from a family of physicians and professors. His paternal grandfather was Samuel Bard, a prominent doctor who was a founder of Columbia University's medical school and physician to George Washington. Samuel Bard's father John Bard had invested in Hyde Park, then a 3,600 acre plantation. His paternal aunt, Eliza Bard married the Rev. John McVickar, a professor at Columbia University. The family had strong connections with the Episcopal Church and Columbia. His maternal grandparents were Ann (née De Nully) Cruger and Nicholas Cruger (brother of Henry Cruger), a St. Croix slave-trader.

== Career ==
Bard's father founded and was the first president of the "New York Life Insurance and Trust Company," the first life insurance company in New York, from 1830 to 1847. Bard himself served as president of the company.

=== St. Stephen's College ===
Bard was a devout Christian and wanted to help improve the quality of life of the poor and to encourage more ministers to be trained. In 1853, Bard and his wife, who held similar beliefs, purchased a part of the Blithewood estate from Robert Donaldson Jr. and renamed it Annandale. The Bards were committed to many educational projects in their community and other nearby neighborhoods. In 1854, John and Margaret established a parish school on their estate in order to educate the area's children with a small building Bard Hall, serving as a school on weekdays and a chapel on weekends. In 1857, the Bards expanded the parish by building the Chapel of the Holy Innocents next to Bard Hall. During this time, John Bard remained in close contact with the New York leaders of the Episcopal Church, the Rt. Rev. Jonathan Mayhew Wainwright, Bishop of New York, and the Rev. John McVickar, superintendent of the Society for Promoting Religion and Learning. They suggested that he found a theological college. The Bards also collaborated with James Starr Clark from Tivoli to found the Trinity Church and School, and also Trinity Academy, a school for young boys.

With the promise of outside financial support, John Bard donated the unfinished Chapel, and the surrounding 18 acres, to the diocese in November 1858. In March 1860, St. Stephen's College was founded. In 1861, construction began on the first St. Stephen's College building, a stone collegiate Gothic dormitory called Aspinwall. St. Stephen's College officially changed its name to Bard College in 1934 in honor of its founder.

== Personal life ==
Coat of Arms of John Bard

In 1849, he married Margaret Taylor Johnston (1825–1875). Margaret was the daughter of John Johnston, a founder of New York University, and the sister of John Taylor Johnston, who served as president of the Central Railroad of New Jersey and was a founder of the Metropolitan Museum of Art. Together, John and Margaret were the parents of:

- Emily Bard (b. 1851), who married Charles Buyamen Lutyens in 1886.
- Caroline Bard (1855–1879), who died unmarried.
- William Bard (1856–1868), who died, aged 12.
- Rosalie DeNormandie Bard (1867–1918), who married lawyer Charles Adams Moran (1859–1934).

After the Bards' only son Willie died in 1868, the Bards and their three daughters moved to Europe. His wife died in Rome on April 10, 1875. In her will, she left all her personal property in trust for the benefit of her husband, with the income in an amount of $12,000 a year to be paid to him as administered by her trustees, brothers John Taylor Johnston and James Boorman Johnston and Stephen Van Rensselaer Cruger.

After his wife's death, he remarried to Annie Belcher in 1886, and moved to 2034 O Street in Washington, D.C. Bard died there on February 12, 1899, but remained involved with the institutions he helped found until his death. He is buried in the Bard cemetery.
