= John Taylor Johnston =

American businessman and patron of the arts

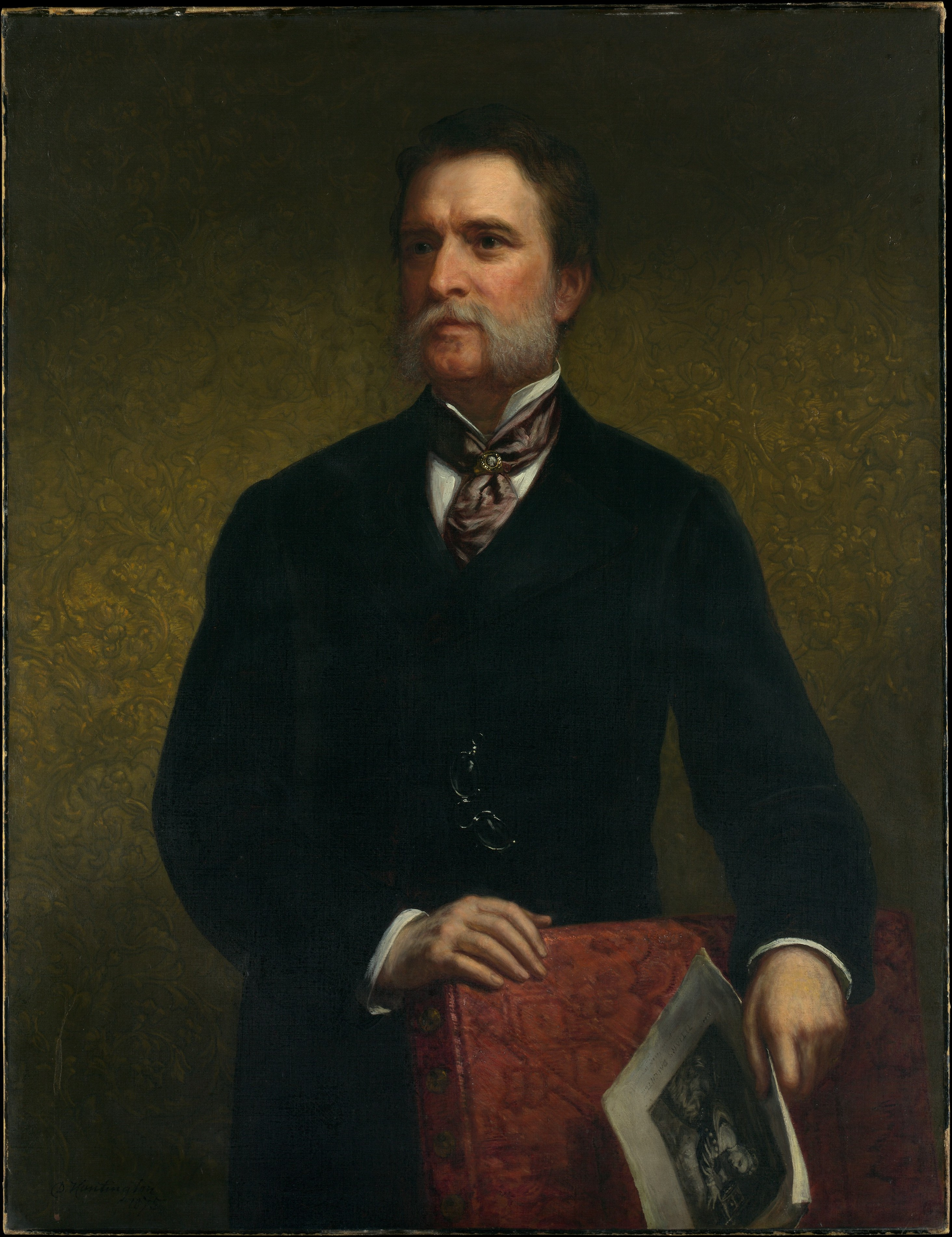
- 1875 Portrait of Johnston, by Daniel Huntington

President of the Metropolitan Museum of Art
- In office 1870–1889
- Preceded by: Inaugural holder
- Succeeded by: Henry Gurdon Marquand

Personal details
- Born: April 8, 1820 New York
- Died: March 24, 1893 (aged 72) Manhattan, New York
- Spouse: Frances Colles (m. 1851; died 1888)
- Parent(s): John Johnston; Margaret Taylor Howard
- Education: Edinburgh High School
- Alma mater: University of the City of New York; Yale Law School
- Occupation: Businessman, lawyer, philanthropist

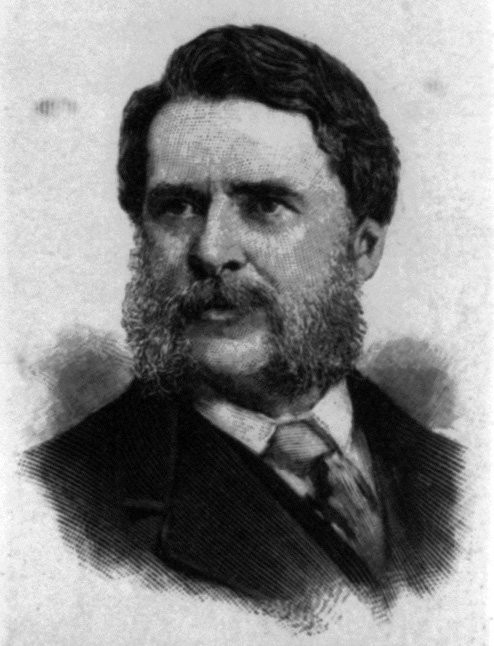
Johnston, Harper's Weekly engraving, 1891.

John Taylor Johnston (April 8, 1820 – March 24, 1893) was an American businessman and patron of the arts. He served as president of the Central Railroad of New Jersey and was one of the founders of The Metropolitan Museum of Art.

== Early life ==
Johnston was born on April 8, 1820, in New York City. He was the eldest child of John Johnston and Margaret (née Taylor) Howard Johnston, a widow of Rhesa Howard Jr. who was the nephew of William Few, Signer of the U.S. Constitution from Georgia whose brother-in-law was U.S. Secretary of the Treasury Albert Gallatin. His younger brother was James Boorman Johnston, who commissioned the Tenth Street Studio Building at 51 West 10th Street between Fifth and Sixth Avenues. His sister, Margaret Taylor Johnston, was married to John Bard (a grandson of Dr. Samuel Bard) and together were founders of Bard College.

Both of his parents were of Scottish ancestry, and his father was a prominent businessman with Boorman, Johnston, & Co. and was a co-founder of Washington Square North. His mother had four siblings who, likewise, married two grandchildren, a great-granddaughter, and a nephew of founding father Roger Sherman, Signer of the U.S. Constitution and the U.S. Declaration of Independence from Connecticut.

Johnston grew up in Greenwich Village, where he was born, and was educated at Edinburgh High School in Edinburgh, Scotland. He graduated from the University of the City of New York, an institution founded by his father and several other civic-minded New Yorkers, in 1839. He later studied at Yale Law School, where his classmates included Charles Astor Bristed, Daniel D. Lord, and Henry G. DeForest.

== Career ==
After being admitted to the bar in 1843, Johnston practiced law until 1848, when he was named president of the Somerville and Easton Railroad (later the Central Railroad of New Jersey), a position he would retain until 1877. He was the driving force behind the company's acquisition of the Lehigh and Susquehanna Railroad, and also endeavored to develop the suburbs of central New Jersey through which his railroads passed. According to his obituary, "[h]is expenditures to secure low grades and good alignment to avoid grade crossings were far in advance of the railroad science of his time and were ridiculed by some of his competitors."

=== Metropolitan Museum of Art ===
Johnston was the founding president of the Metropolitan Museum of Art in 1870. Together with William Tilden Blodgett, he financed the initial "1871 purchase" of 174 paintings for the museum. He held this position until ill health forced him to retire in 1889, at which point he was succeeded by Henry Gurdon Marquand and the museum's Trustees voted him Honorary President for Life. He was also a patron to living American artists and was an avid collector, including many French academic paintings. His personal art collection in his Fifth Avenue mansion, which included works by Frederic Edwin Church, Thomas Cole, Asher Brown Durand, John Frederick Kensett, and Winslow Homer,

In addition to his patronage of the arts, Johnston served as President of the Governing Board of the University of the City of New York, and as a member of the boards of the Presbyterian Hospital, the Woman's Hospital of New York, and the Saint Andrew's Society. He was also a member of the Century Association, and a trustee of the American Museum of Natural History and the National Academy of Design.

== Personal life ==
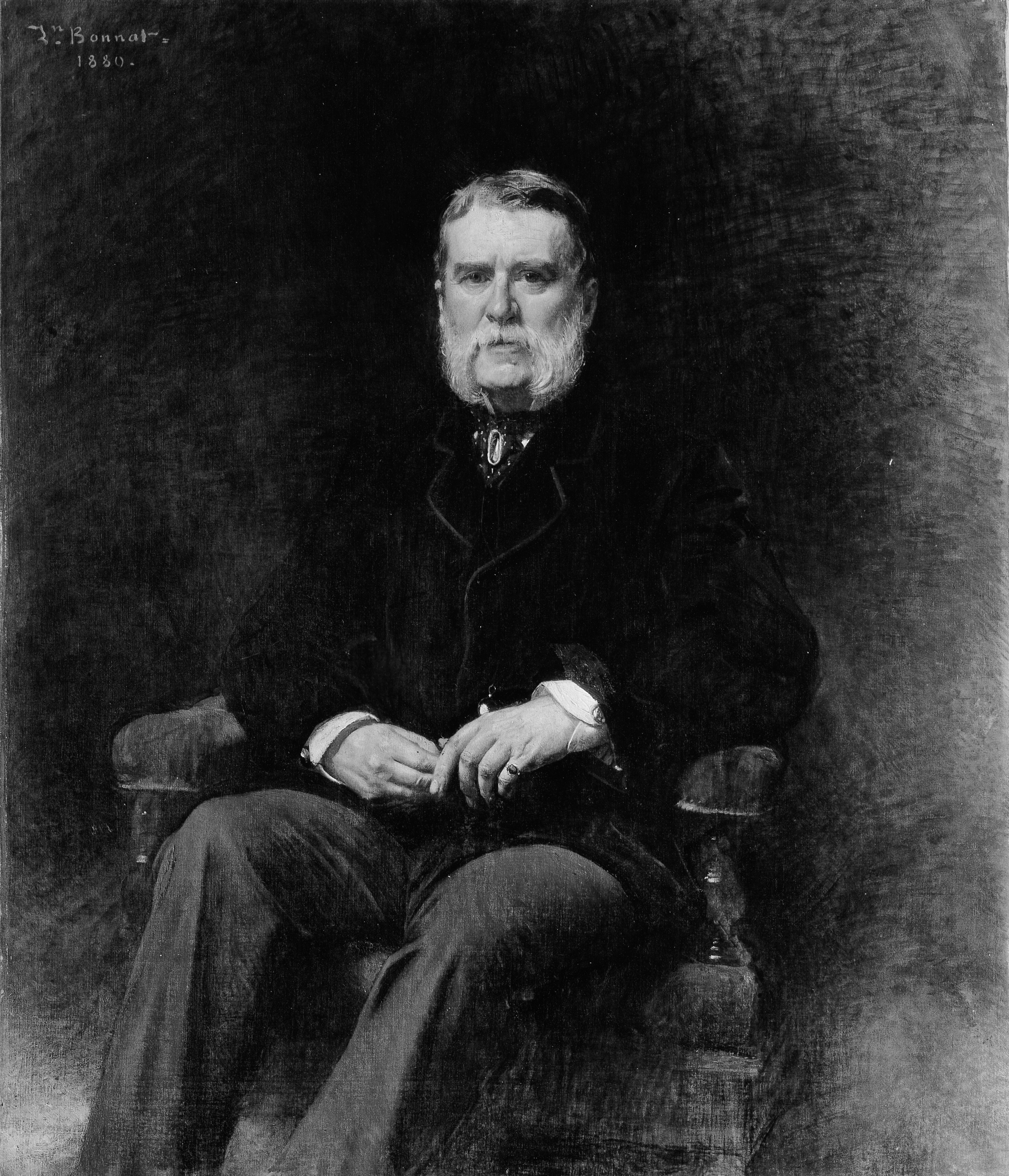
Portrait of Johnston Léon Bonnat, 1880.

In 1851, Johnston was married to Frances Colles (1826–1888), the daughter of Harriet (née Wetmore) Colles and James Colles, a prominent merchant in New York and New Orleans. Their children were:

- Emily Johnston (1851–1942), who married Robert W. de Forest, a lawyer, financier, and philanthropist.
- Colles Johnston (1853–1886), who died unmarried.
- John Herbert Johnston (1855–1931), who married Celestine Noel (1860–1940).
- Eva Johnston, who married Henry Eugene Coe.
- Frances Johnston (1857–1928), who married Pierre Mali (1856–1923), the former Belgian Consul-General in New York.

In 1856, Johnston constructed the first marble mansion in New York as his residence at 8 Fifth Avenue, just north of Washington Square.

Johnston was an active diarist, recording details of his travels through Europe and the United States as well as significant personal and world events, including his wedding excursion, trips with his family, a visit to Richmond, Virginia in 1865 after the surrender of the Confederate Army, and a trip west on the newly built Union Pacific Railroad.

In his later years, Johnston was afflicted with creeping paralysis (possibly multiple sclerosis) and withdrew from public life. He died at his Fifth Avenue estate in New York City on March 24, 1893. His funeral was held at the Scotch Presbyterian Church (now the Second Presbyterian Church) in New York, of which he was an elder, and he is interred at Greenwood Cemetery. In his will, he left $10,000 each to the University of the City of New York and The Metropolitan Museum of New York.

=== Descendants ===
Through his daughter Frances, Johnston is the great-great-grandfather of American slam poet Taylor Mali.

== Legacy ==
Johnston Avenue in lower Jersey City, New Jersey (designated County Route 614 for a 0.81-mile (1.30 km) section of its length) begins in the west at the foot of Bergen Hill close to Communipaw Junction and ends at the Liberty State Park Station of the Hudson Bergen Light Rail. The cobblestoned portion street continues under New Jersey Turnpike Newark Bay Extension, in Liberty State Park to the Communipaw Terminal on the Upper New York Bay and in the 1970s was rededicated Audrey Zapp Drive to honor a local environmentalist influential in the development of the park.

The Port Johnston Coal Docks on Constable Hook in Bayonne, New Jersey, also bear his name. The former Johnston Avenue Yard was the terminus for the Lehigh Valley Terminal Railway.

Johnston Drive in Watchung, the borough just north of his Plainfield Home at 857-859 East Front Street, was named after Johnston.

Cultural offices
Preceded by Inaugural holder	President of the Metropolitan Museum of Art; 1870-1889	Succeeded by Henry Gurdon Marquand
