= John Johnston (merchant) =

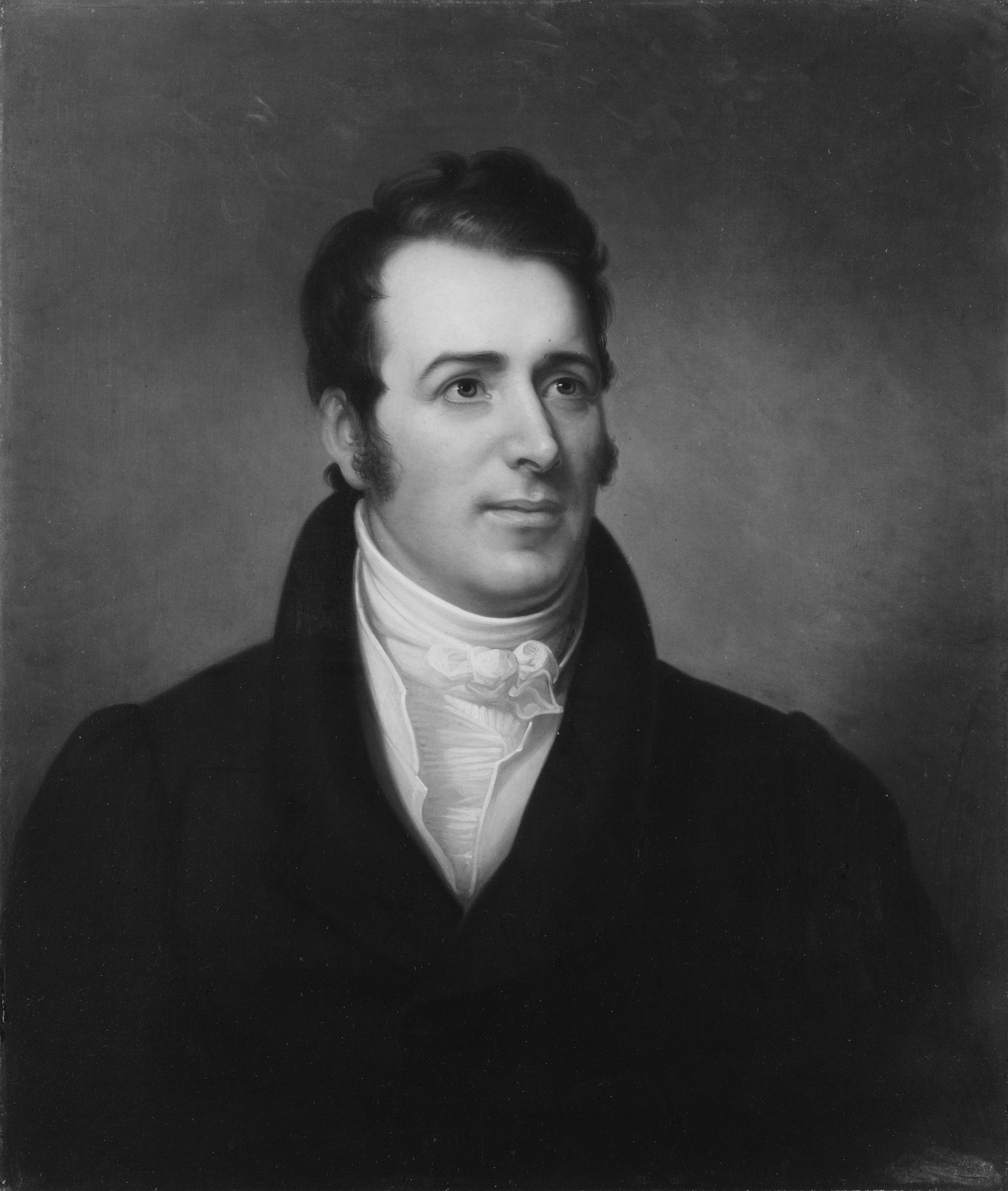
- Portrait of Johnston by Rembrandt Peale, c. 1826-1829.

President of the Saint Andrew's Society of the State of New York
- In office 1831–1832
- Preceded by: John Graham
- Succeeded by: David Hadden

Personal details
- Born: January 22, 1781 Balmaghie, Gallowayshire, Scotland
- Died: April 20, 1851 (aged 70) New York City, New York, U.S.
- Spouse: Margaret Taylor Howard (m. 1817)
- Parent(s): John Johnston; Dorothea Proudfoot Johnston

John Johnston (January 22, 1781 – April 20, 1851) was a Scottish-American bookkeeper and merchant who was a co-founder of New York University.

== Early life ==
Johnston was born on January 22, 1781, at Barnboard Mill in the Parish of Balmaghie, Gallowayshire, Scotland. He was a son of John Johnston and Dorothea (née Proudfoot) Johnston, who married in 1780. After his mother's death in June 1794, his father remarried to Margaret Rae in 1795. Johnston, an only child of his parents' marriage, became the elder brother to ten half-siblings, including brothers William, Robert, Samuel, and sisters Agnes and Margaret, as well as uncle to John Taylor Sherman.

His paternal grandparents were William Johnston and Janet (née McCreedy) Johnston and he was educated in the neighboring village of Laurieston, and also at Boreland.

== Career ==
In 1804, at twenty-two years old, he came to New York and became a bookkeeper in Robert Lenox's counting house. After nine years with Lenox and Maitland, Johnston and partner James Boorman established the merchant house Boorman, Johnston, & Co. in 1813. The firm, based at 57 South Street, sold Scotch goods and, later, tobacco from Virginia and wines from Madeira and Italy. They also owned an iron warehouse at 119 Greenwich Street and, in 1828, admitted Adam Norrie as a partner.

Johnston was elected a member of the Saint Andrew's Society of New York in 1811. He served as its manager from 1819 to 1823, second vice-president from 1823 to 1827, first vice-president from 1827 to 1828 and president from 1831 to 1832.

In 1839, Johnston and several other civic-minded New Yorkers founded the University of the City of New York (today known as New York University). He was also a co-founder of Washington Square North.

== Personal life ==
On September 2, 1817, Johnston married Margaret (née Taylor) Howard (1784–1879). She was a widow of Rhesa Howard Jr., himself a nephew of William Few, signer of the U.S. Constitution from Georgia whose brother-in-law was U.S. Secretary of the Treasury Albert Gallatin. Margaret, the daughter of John Taylor and Margaret (née Scott) Taylor, had four siblings who, likewise, married two grandchildren, a great-granddaughter, and a nephew of founding father Roger Sherman, signer of the U.S. Constitution and the U.S. Declaration of Independence from Connecticut. Together, John and Margaret were the parents of:

- John Taylor Johnston (1820–1893), who married Frances Colles (1826–1888), the daughter of Harriet (née Wetmore) Colles and James Colles, a prominent merchant in New York and New Orleans.
- Andrew Taylor Johnston (1821–1821), who died in infancy.
- James Boorman Johnston (1822–1887), who married Mary Hoppins Humphreys. He commissioned the Tenth Street Studio Building at 51 West 10th Street between Fifth and Sixth Avenues. They were the parents of artist John Humphreys Johnston.
- Margaret Taylor Johnson (1825–1875), who married John Bard (a grandson of Dr. Samuel Bard) in 1849 and became founders of Bard College.
- Emily Proudfoot Johnston (1827–1831), who died in infancy.

Johnston, who suffered from gout, died on April 20, 1851, at his residence, 7 Washington Square in New York City.

=== Descendants ===
Through his son John Taylor, he was the grandfather of Emily Johnston (1851–1942) (wife of Robert W. de Forest); Colles Johnston (1853–1886); John Herbert Johnston (1855–1931), Eva Johnston (wife of Henry Eugene Coe); and Frances Johnston (wife of Pierre Mali, the former Belgian Consul-General in New York).
