= St. James Episcopal Church (Hyde Park, New York) =

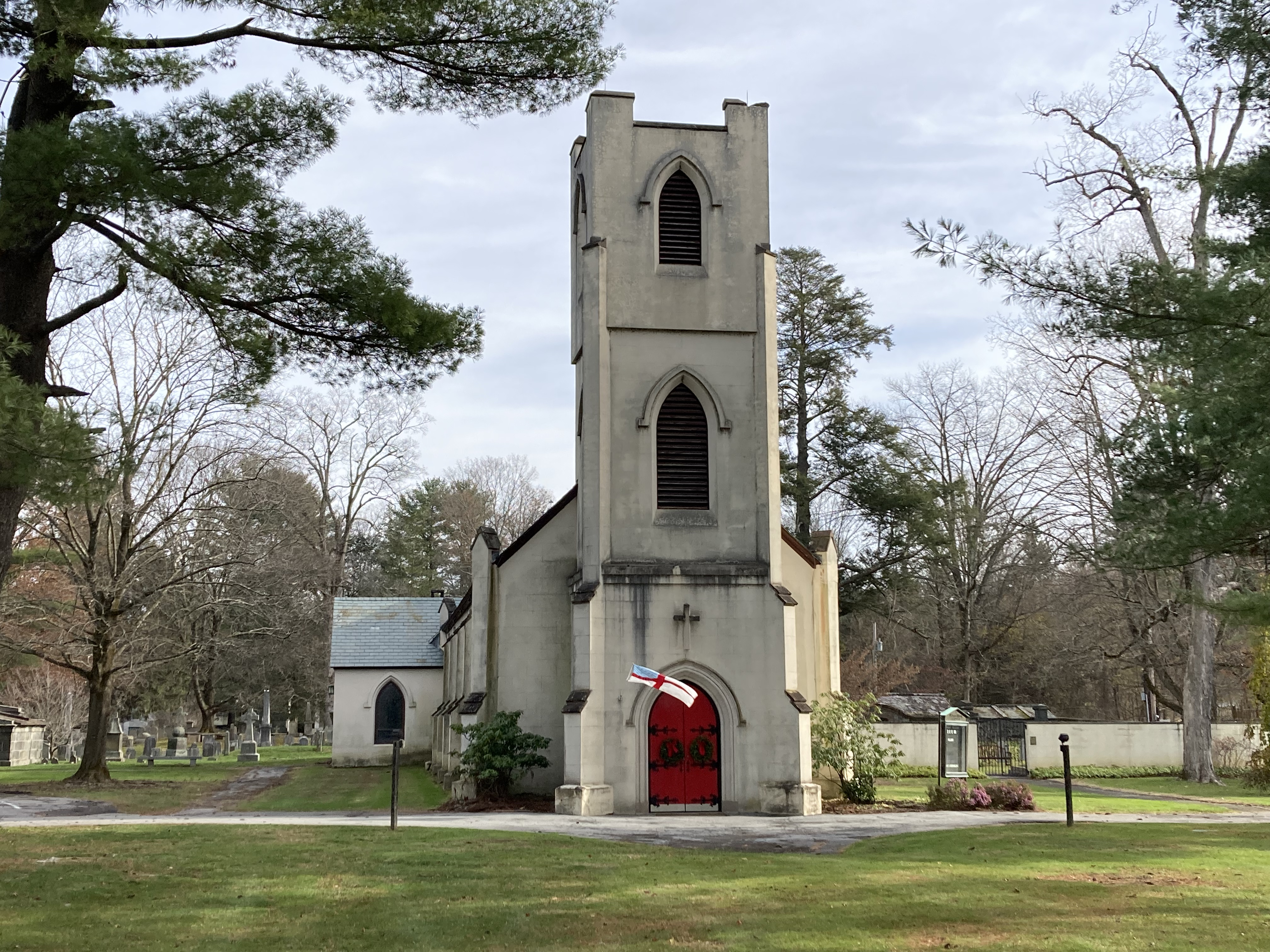
- St. James Episcopal Church
- Location: 4526 Albany Post Road Hyde Park, New York
- Country: United States
- Denomination: Episcopal Church
- Website: stjameshydepark.org

History
- Founded: 1811; 215 years ago
- Dedication: St. James
- Consecrated: October 10, 1811

Architecture
- Architectural type: Church
- Completed: 1844

Administration
- Province: Province II
- Diocese: New York

Clergy
- Bishop: Matthew Heyd

St. James Episcopal Church is a parish church of the Episcopal Diocese of New York, located at 4526 Albany Post Road (U.S. Route 9) in Hyde Park, New York, across the street from the Vanderbilt Mansion National Historic Site. The church is associated with Franklin Delano Roosevelt, the 32nd President of the United States, whose family estate is located 2.7 miles south of the church. Roosevelt served in the vestry and as senior warden of the church, even during his presidency, and he, his wife Eleanor, and their family regularly attended service there whenever they were in Hyde Park.

The church reported 206 members in 2016 and 108 members in 2023; no membership statistics were reported in 2024 parochial reports. Plate and pledge income reported for the congregation in 2024 was $186,912 with average Sunday attendance (ASA) of 73 persons.

== Churchyard ==
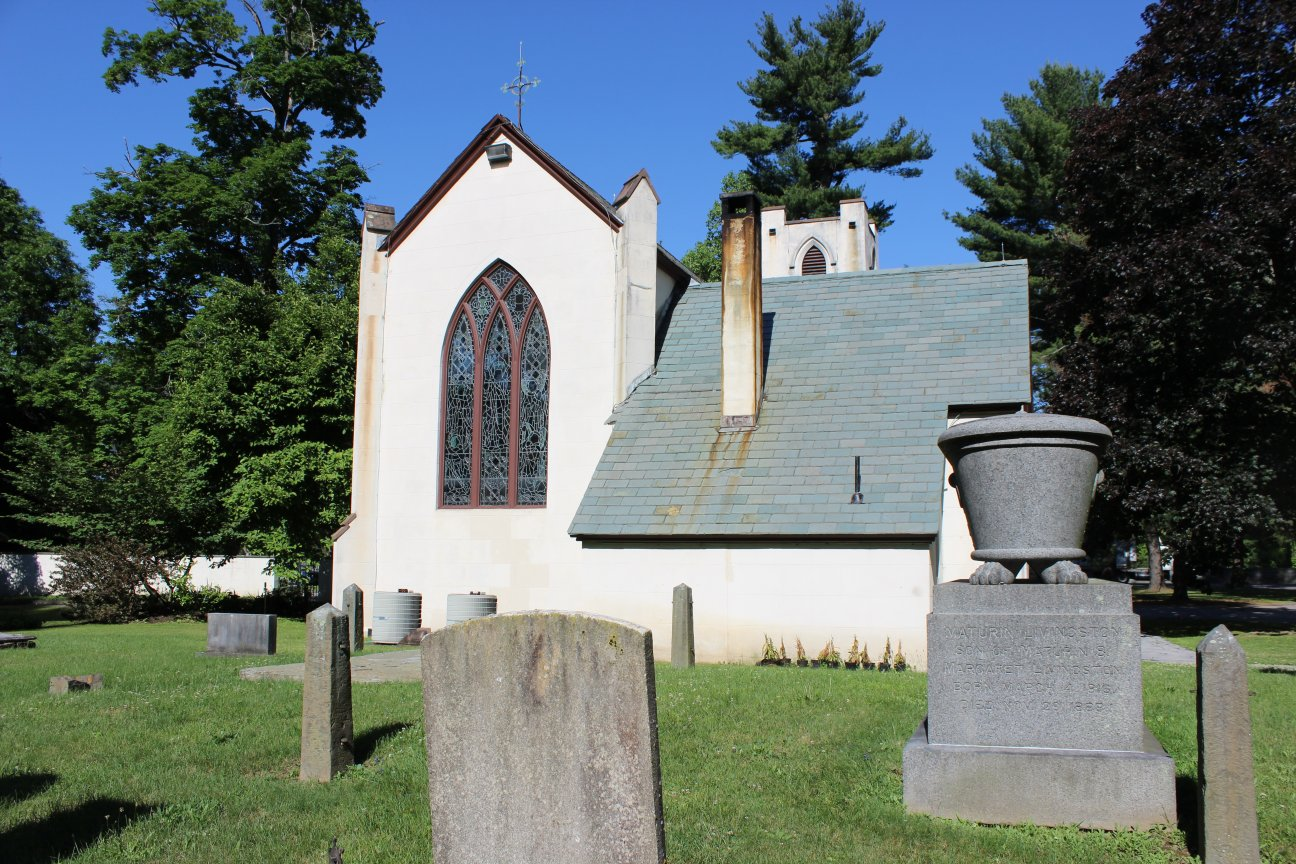
View of the east side, from the churchyard

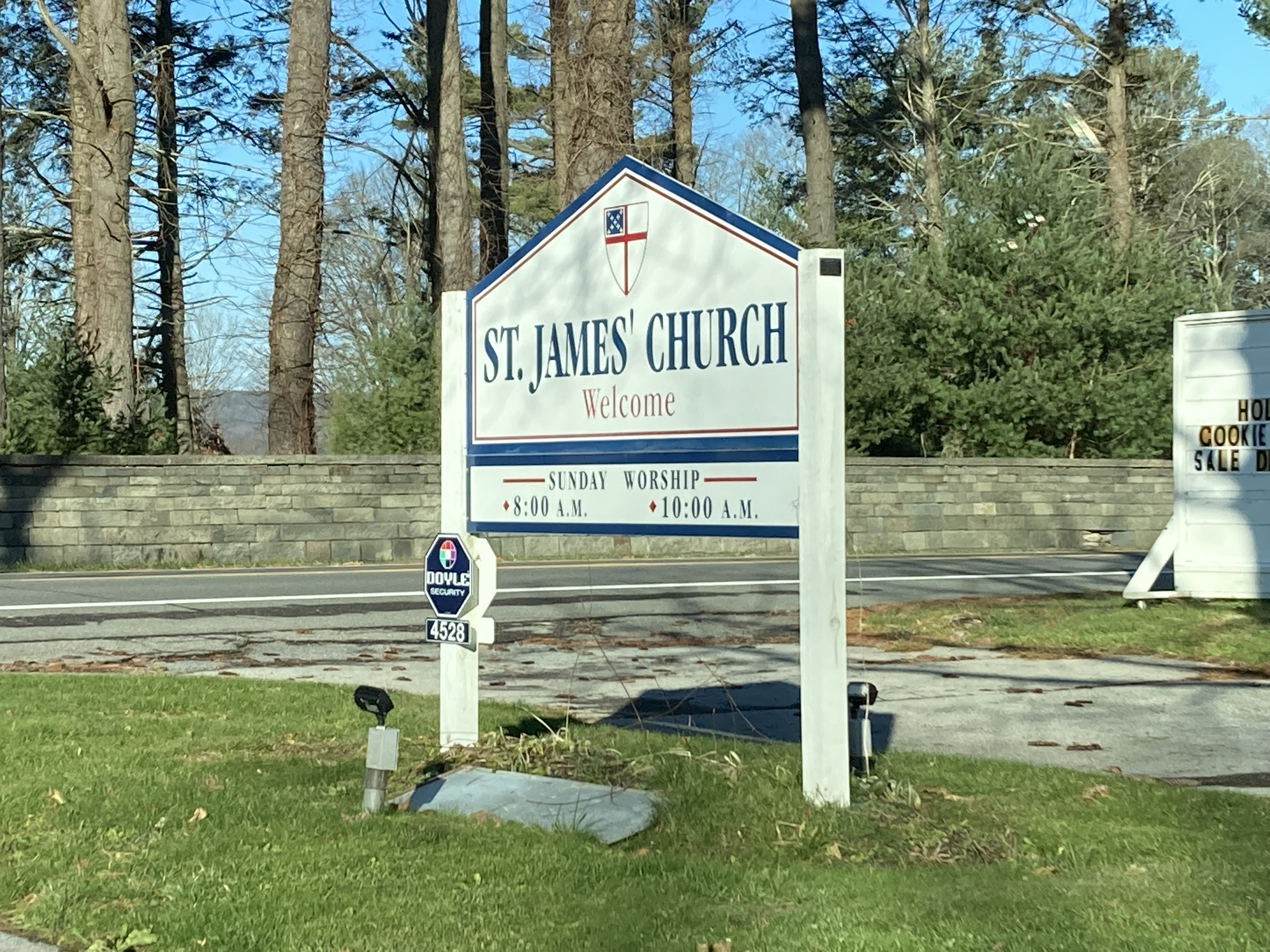
Sign on U.S. Route 9 (Albany Post Road)

The churchyard contains the graves or memorials of a variety of notables, including several members of Franklin Roosevelt's family.

=== Roosevelt family ===
- James Roosevelt I (1828–1900), FDR's father
- Rebecca Brien Howland Roosevelt (1831–1876), James' first wife
- Sara Ann Delano Roosevelt (1854–1941), James' second wife, FDR's mother
- James Roosevelt Roosevelt (1854–1927), son of James Roosevelt and Rebecca Howland, FDR's half-brother
- Four of Franklin and Eleanor Roosevelt's children:
  - Anna Eleanor Roosevelt Dall Boettiger Halsted (1906–1975) and her third husband Dr. James Addison Halsted (1905–1984)
  - The first Franklin Delano Roosevelt, Jr. (March–November 1909)
  - The second Franklin Delano Roosevelt, Jr. (1914–1988)
  - John Aspinwall Roosevelt (1916–1981)

=== Other notables ===
- Samuel Bard (1742–1821), personal physician to George Washington, founder of Columbia University College of Physicians and Surgeons
- Elbridge Thomas Gerry (1837–1927), activist and reformer, grandson of Founding Father Elbridge Gerry
- Francis G. Landon (1859–1947), soldier, politician, member of the New York State Assembly
- Morgan Lewis (1754–1844), Governor of New York 1804–1807, colonel in the Continental Army during the Revolution, general in the United States Army during the War of 1812
- Ogden Livingston Mills (1884–1937), Secretary of the Treasury under President Herbert Hoover
- Nathaniel Pendleton (1756–1821), lawyer and judge, served as second to Alexander Hamilton during duel with Aaron Burr in 1804
- Edmund Henry Pendleton (1788–1862), Dutchess County judge, U.S. Congressman from New York
