= Samuel Bard (physician) =

American physician

- portrait by James Sharples

Physician to the President
- In office 1789–1789
- President: George Washington
- Preceded by: Position established
- Succeeded by: James Craik

Personal details
- Born: April 1, 1742 Philadelphia, Province of Pennsylvania, British America
- Died: May 24, 1821 (aged 79) Hyde Park, New York, U.S.
- Spouse: Mary Bard
- Children: 8, including William Bard
- Parent(s): John Bard; Suzanne Valleau Bard
- Relatives: John Bard (grandson)
- Education: King's College; University of Edinburgh
- Occupation: Physician

Samuel Bard (April 1, 1742 – May 24, 1821) was an American physician who founded the first medical school in New York City and the second medical school in the United States at King's College, now known as Columbia University College of Physicians and Surgeons. He was a personal physician to George Washington. His description of the disease diphtheria was instrumental in formulating treatment for that condition.

== Early life ==
Bard was born in Philadelphia on April 1, 1742. He was a son of Suzanne (née Valleau) Bard (1720–1784), a granddaughter of Peter Fauconnier, and John Bard (1716–1799), a physician who was born in Burlington, New Jersey.

He first studied at King's College, and in September 1761 sailed to Europe to obtain a thorough medical education. He spent five years in France, England, and Scotland and received his M.D. at the University of Edinburgh in May 1765. On his return, he found his father in debt for his education, which had cost more than a thousand pounds. He entered into partnership with him, and for three years drew nothing beyond his expenses from the profits of the business, amounting to 1,500 a year.

== Career ==
Bard was elected to the American Philosophical Society in 1767. In 1769, Bard founded the first hospital in New York called the Hospital in the City of New York in America, which became New York Hospital (now a part of NewYork–Presbyterian Hospital). Bard formed the plan of the Medical School of New York, which was published within a year after his return. He was appointed Professor of the Practice of Physics. Medical degrees were first conferred in 1769. In the same year, the hospital was founded by his exertions; but the building was burnt, causing a delay of the establishment until 1791. In the time of the war he left the city, placing his family in the house of his father at Hyde Park; but anxious to provide for his wife and children and to secure his property, in the next year, he returned to New York, while the enemy had possession of it, and engaged in his professional business.

After the return of peace, Washington selected him as his family physician. At this period he lost four out of his six children by scarlatina, which prevailed in a violent form. In consequence of the illness of Mrs. Bard, he withdrew from business for a year, devoting himself to her. In 1784, he returned to the city. Having formed the purpose to retire from business, in 1798, he moved to his seat in the neighborhood of his father at Hyde Park. But, when the yellow fever appeared, he resolutely returned to his post. By his fearless exposure of himself he took the disease; but, nursed by his wife, he recovered. The remaining 23 years of his life were spent in happy retirement, surrounded by his children and grandchildren. In 1813, he was appointed President of the College of Physicians and Surgeons.

== Personal life ==
Coat of Arms of Samuel Bard

After paying back his father for his medical school debt, he married his cousin, Mary Bard (1746–1821), to whom he had long been attached. Together, they were the parents of eight children (five who died young, four from scarlet fever):

- Susannah Bard (1772–1845), who in 1792 married John Johnston (1762–1850), presiding Judge of the Court of Common Pleas of Dutchess County from 1807 to 1817. He was a son of merchant David Johnston.
- John Bard (1774–1783), who died of scarlet fever.
- Mary Bard (1776–1783), who also died of scarlet fever.
- William Bard (1778–1853), who studied law under Judge Maturin Livingston and married Catherine Cruger (1781–1868) in 1802.
- Harriet Bard (1779–1783), who also died of scarlet fever.
- Sarah Bard (d. 1783), who also died of scarlet fever.
- Harriet Bard (1786–1786), who died in infancy.
- Eliza Bard (1789–1838), who married John McVickar (1787–1868), the First Rector of St. James Church in Hyde Park.

Bard's sister Ann was the wife of John Pierce Jr. Pierce was a Continental Army and United States Army officer who served as Paymaster-General of the United States Army.

He died of pleurisy on May 24, 1821. His wife succumbed of the same disorder the preceding day, and they were buried in one grave.

=== Descendants ===
Through his son William, he was the grandfather of John Bard, founder of Bard College.

== Selected works ==
- A discourse upon the duties of a physician: with some sentiments, on the usefulness and necessity of a public hospital (1769)
- An enquiry into the nature, cause and cure, of the angina suffocativa, or, sore throat distemper (1771)
- A discourse on medical education (1819)
- A compendium of the theory and practice of midwifery (1819)
