= John Bard (physician) =

American physician (1716–1799)

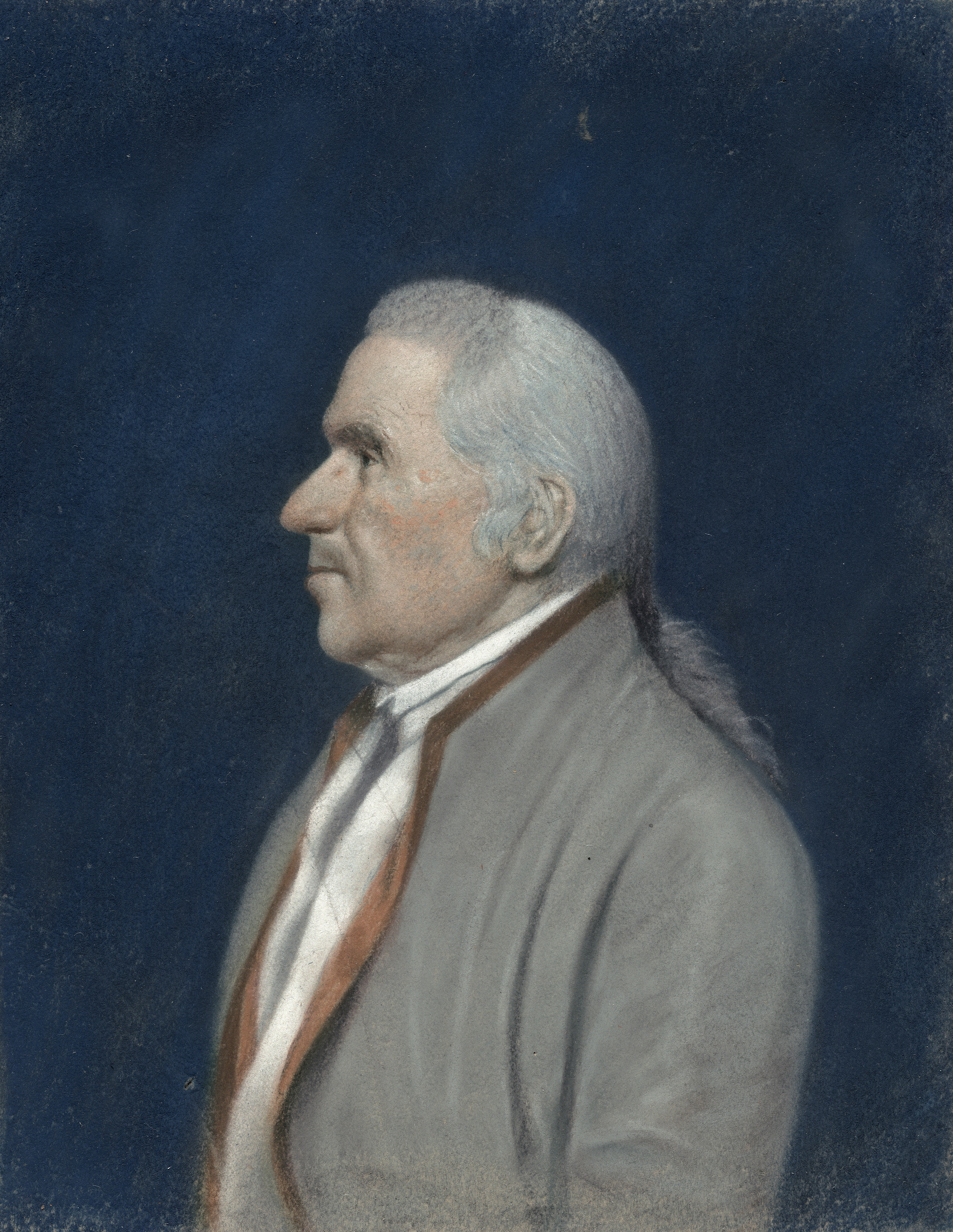
- portrait attributed to James Sharples
- Born: February 1, 1716; Burlington
- Died: March 30, 1799; Hyde Park
- Occupation: Medical doctor
- Children: 2, including Samuel Bard

John Bard (February 1, 1716 – March 30, 1799) was an American physician notable for being the first in the United States to participate in a systematic dissection for the purpose of instruction and the first in the country to report a case of extra-uterine pregnancy.

== Early life and education ==
John Bard was born in Burlington, New Jersey. His father, Peter Bard, was a Huguenot refugee who fled France following the revocation of the edict of Nantes and settled in Burlington, where he was appointed judge of the supreme court and a member of the governor's council. John Bard's father died at an early age and his mother, a daughter of an English physician named Marmion, raised the family of seven children alone. John, her third son, was sent to Philadelphia, where he received a rudimentary classical education from a Scottish gentleman named Annan, who was an accomplished Latin teacher and an exponent of polished manners.

At the age of fifteen, John was apprenticed to John Kearsly, a talented English surgeon known for his temper. He reportedly treated his pupils severely and subjected them to menial employments, to which John would have scarcely submitted, as he said, were it not for fear of disappointing his mother and because of his affection for Mrs. Kearsley, who showed him the greatest kindness. For seven years, he stayed with the doctor, sacrificing sleep for hours of study.

An early friendship with Benjamin Franklin served to brighten Bard's leisure hours and stimulate his industry. They were members of the same club and they maintained their friendship throughout life through correspondence.

== Career ==
Bard settled first in Philadelphia, where he married Miss Valleau, a niece of Mrs. Kearsley. She was, like himself, a descendant of a refugee and equally financially constrained. Their first child, Samuel Bard, became an organizer of the first medical college in New York and a noted writer on midwifery. John Bard's daughter Ann became the wife of John Pierce Jr., the Paymaster-General of the United States Army. After practicing for six to seven years in Philadelphia, Bard was induced by Franklin to move to New York in 1746 to take over the practice of Dr. Dubois and Dr. Dupie, who had died of yellow fever.

Upon the arrival in New York harbor of a Dutch ship in 1759 containing cases of malignant ship fever, Bard was employed by the corporation to take proper quarantine measures. Every nurse and attendant in the hospital had the disease. Thus, Bard was impelled to draw up a memorial urging the expediency of providing a pest house against similar occurrences and the result was the purchase of Bedloe's Island and the building upon it, Bard becoming a health officer. He was likewise appointed surgeon and agent for the sick and wounded seamen of the British navy at New York, retaining the position until he retired from practice. He was a friend of Peter Middleton, one of the noted medical men of the time and a founder of the medical department of King's College, and Bard assisted Middleton in the first recorded dissection.

As regards this, David Hosack says: "As early, however, as 1750, the body of Hermannus Carroll, executed for murder, was dissected in this city by two of the most eminent physicians of that day, Drs. John Bard and Peter Middleton, and the blood vessels injected for the instruction of the youth then engaged in the study of medicine; this was the first essay made in the United States for the purpose of imparting medical knowledge by the dissection of the human body, of which we have any record."

In 1778, Bard retired from practice and settled on a farm he owned at Hyde Park, on the Hudson River, in Dutchess County, but was reduced in fortune by the American Revolution. He returned to New York at the end of 1783 and resumed practice. On the establishment of the Medical Society of the State of New York in 1788, he was unanimously chosen as its first president.

Bard was not a voluminous writer. In a letter to John Fothergill of London, dated December 25, 1759, he communicated "A case of an extra-uterine foetus," which was read to "A society of physicians in London," on March 24, 1760, and published subsequently in Medical Observations and Inquiries, in 1762. It was a woman of 28 years who went through her second pregnancy with only slight abnormal symptoms and at the end of nine months had a few labor pains, but the delivery did not take place. In spite of the presence of a large right-sided abdominal tumor, she had another healthy child by normal labor, but five days after delivery pain and fever began and at the end of nine weeks of treatment by fomentations, fluctuation in the tumor could be determined. Bard in the presence of Dr. Huck, an army physician, opened the abdomen with a long incision and delivered a macerated full-time fetus and much pus, the patient then nursed her child and made a good recovery.

Several papers on yellow fever from Bard's pen are to be found in the files of the American Medical and Philosophical Register, and after his death they appeared in the same publication (April 1811, I, 409–421) an essay on the nature and cause of malignant pleurisy that had been delivered before "A weekly society of gentlemen in New York," in January 1749. Here we have a reference to probably the earliest medical society in the country. It was patterned after Dr. Fothergill's London society apparently and, according to Peter Middleton, was in existence twenty years later.

In 1795 Bard, then in his eightieth year, gave an address before the state medical society calling attention to the presence of yellow fever in the city, meeting much opposition and some obloquy by so doing. Nevertheless, his advice on treating this dread disease—sweating the patient—proved more successful than other methods. In 1798, he gave up practice and retired to Hyde Park where he died on March 30, 1799, at the age of 83.
