= Florent Cunier =

Belgian ophthalmologist (1812-1853)

- Born: Florent Cunier; 1812; Beloeil, Hainaut, Belgium, Kingdom of the Netherlands
- Died: 19 April 1853 (aged 40–41); Brussels, Belgium
- Education: State University of Leuven
- Occupations: Ophthalmologist; Medical doctor
- Awards: Order of Leopold; Order of Christ; Order of the Rose

Florent Cunier (1812 – 1853) was a Belgian ophthalmologist, medical doctor, and the founder of Annales d'oculistique.

== Biography ==
=== Early life and education ===
Florent Cunier was born in Beloeil, Hainaut, Belgium in 1812. Antoine Cunier, his father, graduated in medicine from the Old University of Leuven and was the physician for Eugène, 8th Prince of Ligne.

Florent studied humanities and philosophy in Charleroi before starting his medical studies at the State University of Leuven. As a student, he was affiliated with the military teaching hospital of Utrecht led by Professor Antoine Gérard van Onsenoort.

He completed his studies in ophthalmology and was awarded his Doctor of Medicine by the faculty of the University of Erlangen.

=== Career ===
==== Military Physician ====
He began his work as a military physician in the Belgian Army, attached to a battalion stationed in Nieuwpoort. In 1837, during a medical trip to the south of France, he collected clinical observations and shared the opinions and doctrines of the University Hospital of Montpellier. He published the Montpellier medical doctrine on the nature of the disease (French: Doctrine médicale de Montpellier sur la nature de la maladie). During this period, Dr. Cunier experimented with therapeutic trials of veratrine based on earlier experiments of French physiologist François Magendie.

As a corresponding member of the Society of Sciences, Arts and Letters of Hainaut, he presented his work on blepharitis titled Considerations on catarrhal blepharophthalmia of the armies (French: Mémoire sur la blépharophtalmie catarrhale des armées Belges) on April 16, 1838.

==== Medical journalism ====
On his return to Belgium, the Belgian ophthalmologist and Dr. Martin Schoenfeld launched a medical journal in Charleroi. The journal, first published as Annales d'oculistique et de Gynécologie in August 1838, split into separate publications in 1839, with Dr. Cunier focusing on his international optometry journal Annales d'oculistique.

==== Dispensary ====
Throughout 1839, he continued his service as a military physician in Namur, offering free consultations to ophthalmologists at his home and traveling to see patients. He resigned from the military in 1840. Dr. Cunier relocated to the City of Brussels and continued his work in medical journalism. By March 1840, he had set up the Ophthalmic Dispensary of Brussels, where he offered free consultations to the city's poor. With over 18,000 patients seeking his expertise and undergoing surgery at his dispensary, Cunier also drew Belgian students and foreign doctors to his clinical lessons on ophthalmology.

In January 1842, his work Division of the Muscles of the Eye in certain cases of Blindness was featured in the Journal of the Royal Society of Medicine published by the Medical and Chirurgical Society of London. That year, he sent an 8-page letter from Brussels to Professor M. Serre of Montpellier on the use of spectacle lenses in the treatment of some eye conditions.

==== Royal Academy of Medicine ====
On 29 October 1842, Florent Cunier was admitted as a member to the Royal Academy of Medicine of Belgium (French: Académie royale de Médecine de Belgique). By 1845, the surgeon of the Ophthamologic Institute was a corresponding member of many of the academies of medicine and medical societies internationally including Amsterdam, Angers, Antwerp, Baden, Barcelona, Berlin, Bordeaux, Bruges, Brussels, Copenhagen, Coruna, Dresden, Erlangen, Ghent, Halle, Hamburg, Heidelberg, Hoorn, Liege, Lisbon, London, Lyon, Madrid, Malines, Mons, Montpellier, Nantes, New Orleans, Palma de Mallorca, Paris, Port of Santa María, Rio de Janeiro, Rotterdam, Sarragosse, Strasbourg, Valence, Verviers, and Vienna.

In late 1845, he was authorized to treat patients at the Clinique Saint-Jean located in Brussels in two rooms. He operated until a typhoid fever epidemic in February 1848 caused overcrowding. Soon after, the Provincial Ophthalmic Institute of Brabant was established and opened on 10 September 1849, on Boulevard du Jardin botanique, with Dr. Cunier as chief surgeon and Dr. Joseph Bosch as assistant physician. He was the ophthalmologist of the Duke of Brabant Leopold II of Belgium and the Count of Flanders.

In 1849, while working as a surgeon at the Ophthalmic Institute in Brussels, he published a memoir detailing his work at the Ophthalmic Dispensary and describing the contagious ophthalmia prevalent among the poor and working class.

Cunier was a corresponding member of the Royal Academy of Medicine of Belgium, Académie Nationale de Médecine, and the German Academy of Sciences Leopoldina. For his military service, he was appointed a Knight of the Order of Leopold and received the Order of Christ from the Queen of Portugal and the Order of the Rose from the Emperor of Brazil. He was an honorary member of the Neuchâtel Society of Natural Sciences.

== Death ==
Florent Cunier died in the City of Brussels, Belgium on 19 April 1853. He succumbed to pulmonary emphysema at the age of 40.

After Dr. Florent Cunier died, his necrology by Dr. Joseph Bosch was published in the 29th volume of the Annales d'oculistique on 30 April 1853. Belgian ophthalmologist Dr. Évariste Warlomont took over as editor-in-chief of the international medical journal.
