= Henry Drury Noyes =

American physician and optometrist (1832-1900)

Henry D. Noyes
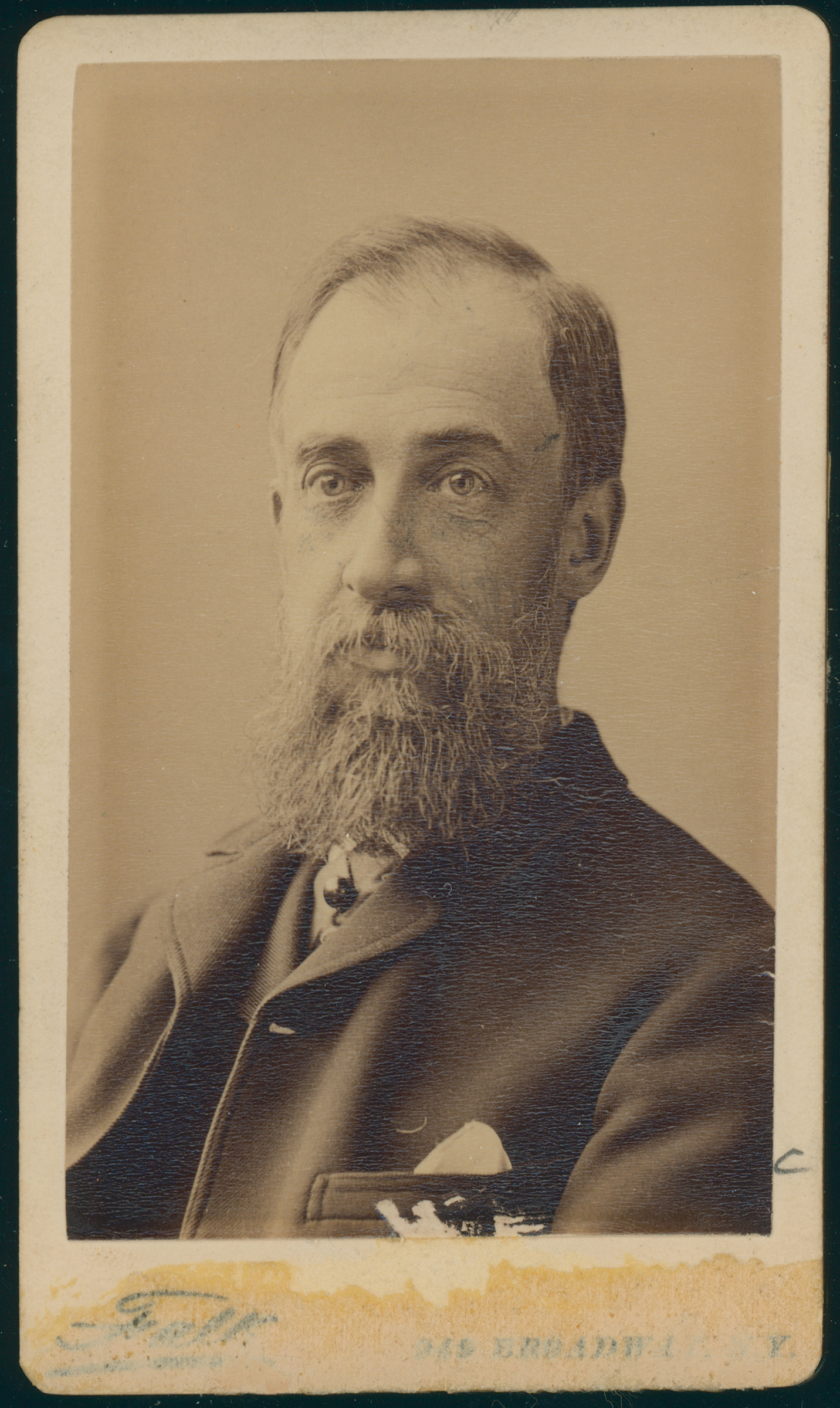
- Born: Henry Drury Noyes; March 24, 1832; Manhattan, New York City, New York, United States
- Died: November 12, 1900 (aged 68); Mount Washington, Massachusetts
- Education: Bellevue Hospital Medical College
- Occupations: Physician; professor
- Medical career
- Profession: Surgeon; Optometrist
- Institutions: NewYork-Presbyterian Hospital; Bellevue Hospital Medical College; New York Eye and Ear Infirmary
- Notable works: A Treatise: Diseases of the eye

Henry Drury Noyes (March 24, 1832 – November 12, 1900) was an American physician, surgeon, optometrist, and former president of the American Ophthalmological Society.

== History ==
Henry Drury Noyes was born in Manhattan, New York on March 24, 1832.

Educated at New York University, he earned his Bachelor of Arts in 1851 and his Master of Arts in 1854. He then studied medicine at the College of Physicians and Surgeons, graduating with a Doctor of Medicine in 1855. He also studied and worked at NewYork-Presbyterian Hospital from 1855 to 1858.

Noyes conducted early studies on Fundus photography and took the first successful fundus photograph of a rabbit eye in 1862.

As a founding member of the American Ophthalmological Society, established on June 7, 1864, Henry D. Noyes joined 18 other physicians, including Daniel Bennett St. John Roosa and Edward Delafield, the society's first president.

In the city of New York, he graduated from Bellevue Hospital Medical College's class of 1865–1866 with a degree in practical anatomy. In 1866, Dr. Noyes was the executive surgeon of the New York Eye and Ear Infirmary.

By 1868, he became a professor of ophthalmology and otology at Bellevue Hospital Medical College.

Elected to the Century Association in New York City on April 4, 1868, with endorsements from Dr. Cornelius Rea Agnew and Henry Peters Gray, he maintained his membership until 1900.

In 1872, Noyes was appointed to a provisional committee of New York physicians including Dr. C. R. Agnew and Dr. Daniel Bennett St. John Roosa who were selected to organize the Fifth International Congress of Ophthalmology in New York City.

He released the textbook, A Treatise: Diseases of the eye in December 1881. At this time, the professor and surgeon was also president of the American Ophthalmological Society and a corresponding member of the New York Ophthalmological Society, the Medical Society of the State of New York, and the New York Academy of Medicine.

== Death ==
Henry Drury Noyes died at Mount Washington, Massachusetts, on November 12, 1900. He was buried in the Evergreen Cemetery in Morristown, New Jersey.
