= International Congress of Ophthalmology =

Biennial ophthalmology conference

International Congress of Ophthalmology Congrès international d'ophtalmology
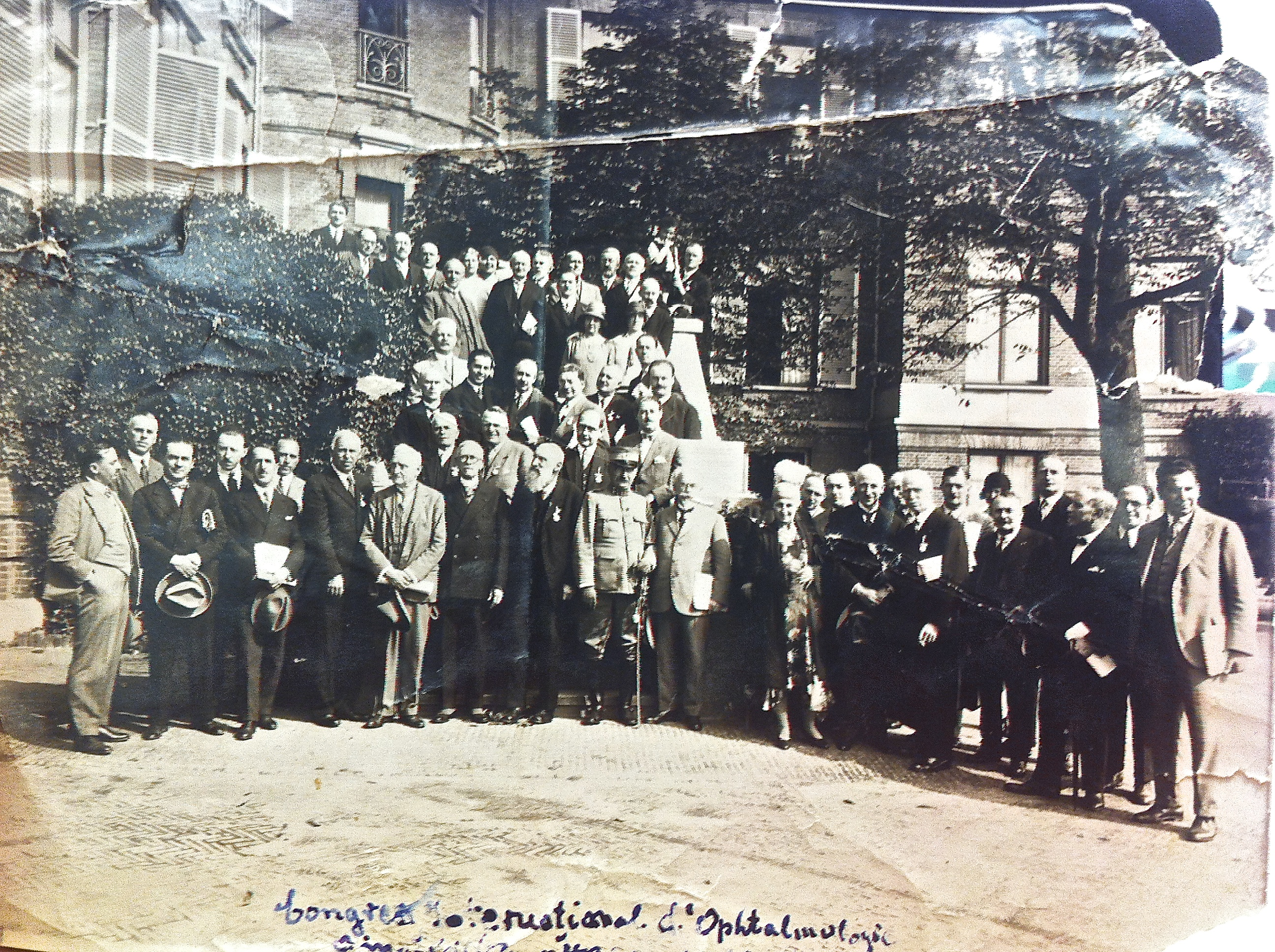
- Status: Active
- Genre: Ophthalmology conference
- Frequency: Biennial
- Location: Varies
- Country: Varies
- Founded: 13 September 1857; 169 years ago, Brussels, Belgium
- Founder: Dr. Évariste Warlomont

The International Congress of Ophthalmology (French: Congrès international d'ophtalmology, or International Ophthalmological Congress), now known as the World Ophthalmology Congress is a biennial international scientific conference to promote ophthalmological science.

== History ==
Dr. Évariste Warlomont, who was Editor-in-chief of the French optometry journal Annales d'oculistique and later Director of the Ophthalmic Institute, first suggested and carried into effect the idea of an Ophthalmological Congress. A call to ophthalmologists and physicians interested in the field was issued on 15 January 1857 by an organizing committee formed by the editorial board of Annales d'oculistique to plan a special ophthalmology congress.

The original Organizing Committee of the First International Ophthalmological Congress consisted of Dr. Louis S. Fallot, President of the Academy of Medicine of Belgium; Dr. J. Bosch, Surgeon of the Brabant Ophthalmic Institute; Dr. F. Hairion, Director of the Brabant Ophthalmic Institute; and Dr. J. Van Roosbroeck; Director of the Brabant Ophthalmic Institute. Dr. Évariste Warlomont acted as the secretary general of the congress.

=== First congress ===
When over 150 ophthalmologists from 24 countries gathered in Brussels, Belgium in 1857, the First Periodic International Congress of Ophthalmology (French: Congrès Périodique International D'Ophthalmologie) was inaugurated and the International Council of Ophthalmology (ICO) was established.

The first Congress of Brussels occurred from 13 to 16 September 1857 at the Royal Academy of Science, Letters and Fine Arts of Belgium and the Royal Academy of Medicine of Belgium at the museum.

=== Second congress ===
The 1862 International Congress of Ophthalmology was held in Paris, France.

=== Third congress ===
Following the second Congress, the 1862 Organizing Committee chose Vienna, Austria as the next location for its meeting, originally set for August 1866. The Vienna Committee, led by Frédéric Jules Sichel, with Dr. Félix Giraud-Teulon and Dr. Louis de Wecker, postponed the Congress due to political unrest during the Unification of Germany and moved it to Paris, France. In 1867, Paris hosted the International Ophthalmological Congress for the second time, from 12 to 14 August. The Congress was presided over by Albrecht von Graefe, with Carl Ferdinand von Arlt and Dr. J. F. Vleminckx as vice-presidents, and Giraud-Teulon and Louis de Wecker as secretaries.

=== Fourth congress ===
Opening on 1 August 1872, the Fourth International Ophthalmological Congress was held in London, England until the 3rd of the month. Dutch ophthalmologist Dr. Franciscus Donders held the role of president. The Congress was granted use of the Royal College of Physicians library by its council. At the end of the London session, a provisional committee of New Yorkers Dr. Cornelius Rea Agnew, Dr. Henry Drury Noyes, and Dr. Daniel Bennett St. John Roosa were selected to organize the next International Congress. Cincinnati's Dr. E. Williams was appointed by the committee to be the next president of the International Congress.

=== Fifth congress ===
The Fifth Congress of Ophthalmology was held at Chickering Hall in New York City from 12 to 14 September 1876. Once the congress was adjourned, the American Ophthalmological Society held a banquet for the foreign delegates at Delmonico's. New York physician H.D. Noye's committee of choice for the next Congress in Milan, Italy included Dr. Hansen of Copenhagen, Prof. Becker of Heidleberg, and Prof. Arlt of Vienna.

=== Sixth congress ===
At the 1880 Congress in Milan, Italy, Dr. Quaglino was elected by the committee to preside. It was held from 1 to 4 September 1880.

=== Seventh congress ===
In 1888, the Seventh Congress was held in Heidelberg from 8 to 11 August. Dr. Franciscus Donders, who presided over the London Congress, took on the role of president for the second time at the Congress in Heidelberg.

=== Eighth congress ===
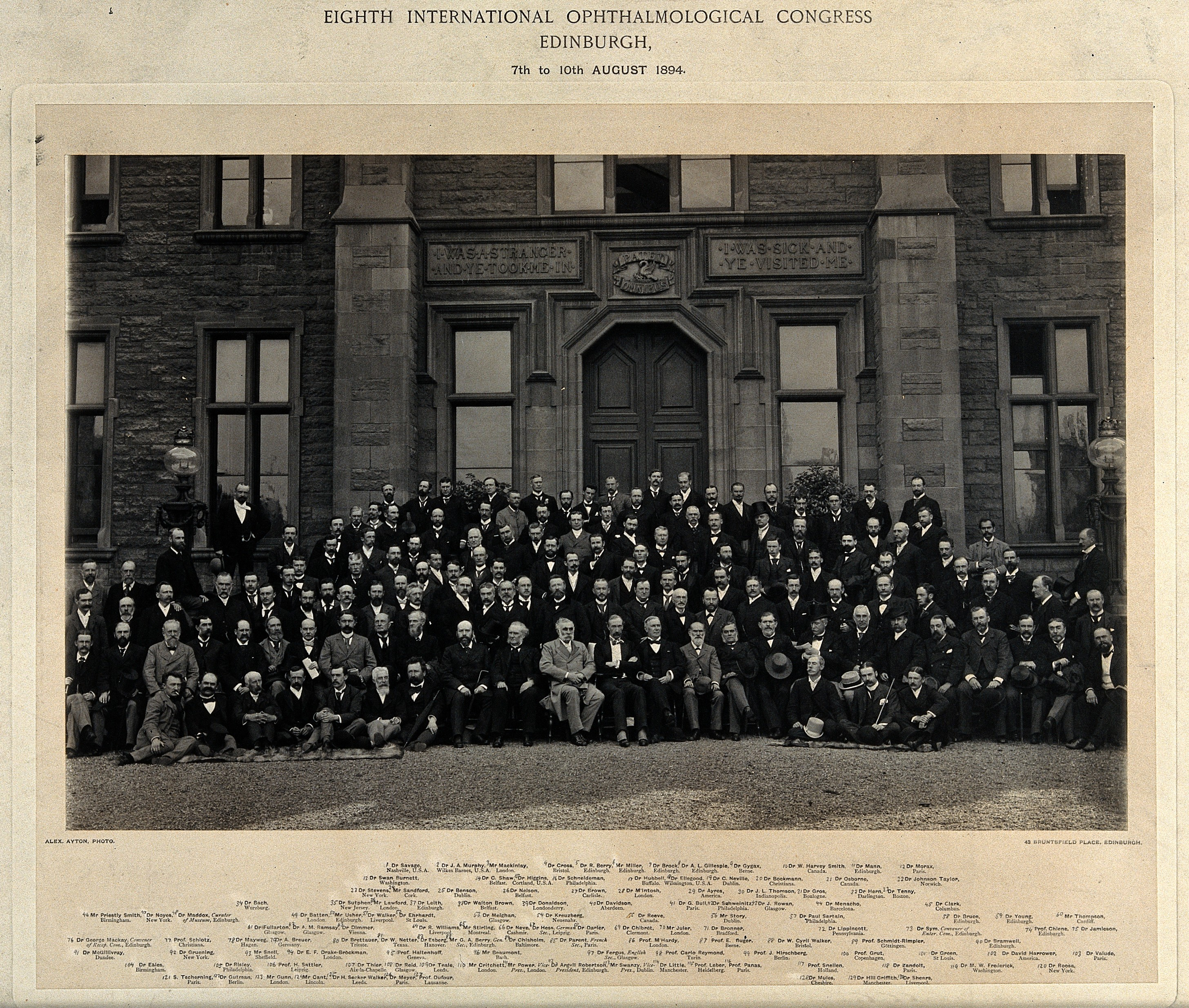
Eighth International Ophthalmological Congress, Edinburgh, Scotland. 1894

Edinburgh, Scotland was the venue for the Eighth International Ophthalmological Congress, which took place from 7 to 10 August 1894. The 1894 International Ophthalmological Congress, led by President Douglas Argyll Robertson, included Sir Henry Rosborough Swanzy of Dublin and Mr. Power of London as vice-presidents, and Dr. George A. Berry as General Secretary. The first session opened with Robertson's address at the Physiology Department of Edinburgh University, followed by a speech from Lord Provost of Edinburgh James Alexander Russell, who was named an Honorary Member of the Congress.

=== Ninth congress ===
In 1899, the Ninth Ophthalmological Congress took place in Utrecht in the Netherlands. German ophthalmologist Richard Liebreich painted a portrait of Albrecht von Graefe, which he exhibited at the International Ophthalmological Congress.

=== Twelfth congress ===
The proceedings of the Twelfth International Congress in Washington, D.C. took place from 25 to 28 April 1922.

=== Eighteenth congress ===
The Eighteenth International Congress of Ophthalmology was held from 8 to 12 September 1958 in Brussels, nearly 100 years after the inaugural congress in Belgium.

== Congress locations and dates ==
Number	Year	Location	Notes
1st	1857	Brussels, Belgium	
2nd	1862	Paris, France	
3rd	1867	Paris, France	
4th	1872	London, England	
5th	1876	New York, United States	
6th	1880	Milan, Italy	
7th	1888	Heidelberg, Germany	
8th	1894	Edinburgh, Scotland	
9th	1899	Utrecht, Germany	
10th	1904	Lucerne, Switzerland	
11th	1909	Naples, Italy	
12th	1922	Washington, D.C., United States	
13th	1929	Amsterdam / The Hague, Netherlands	
14th	1933	Madrid, Spain	
15th	1937	Cairo, Egypt	
16th	1950	London, England	
17th	1954	Montreal / New York	
18th	1958	Brussels, Belgium	
19th	1962	New Delhi, India	
20th	1966	Munich, Germany	
21st	1970	Mexico City, Mexico	
22nd	1974	Paris, France	
23rd	1978	Kyoto, Japan	
24th	1982	San Francisco, United States	
25th	1986	Rome, Italy	
26th	1990	Singapore	
27th	1994	Toronto, Canada	
28th	1998	Amsterdam, Netherlands	
29th	2002	Sydney, Australia	
30th	2006	São Paulo, Brazil	
31th	2008	Hong Kong, China	
32nd	2010	Berlin, Germany	
33rd	2012	Abu Dhabi, United Arab Emirates	
34th	2014	Tokyo, Japan	Host: Japanese Ophthalmological Society
35th	2016	Guadalajara, Mexico	Host: Mexican Society of Ophthalmology
36th	2018	Barcelona, Spain	Host: Spanish Society of Ophthalmology
37th	2020	Virtual	Host: Ophthalmology Society of South Africa (OSSA)
38th	2022	Virtual	Host: Chinese Ophthalmological Society
39th	2024	Vancouver, Canada	
40th	2026	Prague, Czech Republic	
