= Rue Victor Hugo =

Rue Victor Hugo may refer to several streets in Francophone countries named after Victor Hugo:

== Algeria ==
- Rue Victor-Hugo in Algiers.

== Belgium ==
- Rue Victor Hugo in Schaerbeek (Brussels)

== France ==
=== Avenues ===
- Avenue Victor-Hugo in Aix-en-Provence
- Avenue Victor-Hugo in Aubervilliers
- Avenue Victor-Hugo in Bagneux
- Avenue Victor-Hugo in Boulogne-Billancourt
- Avenue Victor-Hugo in Bourg-la-Reine
- Avenue Victor-Hugo in Clamart
- Avenue Victor-Hugo in Fontenay-sous-Bois
- Avenue Victor-Hugo in Neuilly-Plaisance
- Avenue Victor-Hugo in Paris
- Avenue Victor-Hugo in Noisy-le-Sec
- Avenue Victor-Hugo in Pavillons-sous-Bois
- Avenue Victor-Hugo in Rodez
- Avenue Victor-Hugo in Saint-Nazaire
- Avenue Victor-Hugo in Saint-Mandé
- Avenue Victor-Hugo in Valence
- Avenue Victor-Hugo in Vanves

=== Boulevards ===
- Boulevard Victor-Hugo in Clichy
- Boulevard Victor-Hugo in Lille
- Boulevard Victor-Hugo in Montpellier
- Boulevard Victor-Hugo in Nantes
- Boulevard Victor-Hugo in Neuilly-sur-Seine
- Boulevard Victor-Hugo in Nice
- Boulevard Victor-Hugo in Saint-Ouen-sur-Seine
- Boulevard Victor-Hugo in Strasbourg

=== Dead ends ===
- Impasse Victor-Hugo in Caen
- Impasse Victor-Hugo in Roanne
- Impasse Victor-Hugo in Saint-Cyr-l'École
- Impasse Victor-Hugo in Toul

=== Places ===
- Place Victor-Hugo of Besançon
- Place Victor-Hugo of Courbevoie
- Place Victor-Hugo of Grenoble
- Place Victor-Hugo of Paris
- Place Victor-Hugo of Toulouse

=== Streets ===
- Rue Victor-Hugo in Bagnolet
- Rue Victor-Hugo in Besançon
- Rue Victor-Hugo in Bois-Colombes
- Rue Victor-Hugo in Carcassonne
- Rue Victor-Hugo in Charenton-le-Pont
- Rue Victor-Hugo in Courbevoie
- Rue Victor-Hugo in Deauville
- Rue Victor-Hugo in Issy-les-Moulineaux
- Rue Victor-Hugo in Levallois-Perret
- Rue Victor-Hugo in Lisieux
- Rue Victor-Hugo in Lyon
- Rue Victor-Hugo in Malakoff
- Rue Victor-Hugo in Mont-de-Marsan
- Rue Victor-Hugo in Pantin
- Rue Victor-Hugo in Pau
- Rue Victor-Hugo in Périgueux
- Rue Victor-Hugo in Rouen
- Rue Victor-Hugo in Toulouse
- Rue Victor-Hugo in Tours
- Rue Victor-Hugo in Sarcelles
- Rue Victor-Hugo in Vienne

== Luxembourg ==
- Avenue Victor-Hugo in Luxembourg City
