= Harvey J. Howard =

American ophthalmologist and academic (1880–1956)

- Born: Harvey James Howard; January 30, 1880; Churchville, New York, US
- Died: November 6, 1956 (aged 76); Clearwater, Florida, US
- Occupations: Ophthalmologist and academic
- Employer(s): Bryn Mawr Hospital; New York Eye and Ear Infirmary; Canton Christian College; Peking Union Medical College; Washington University in St. Louis

Academic background
- Education: University of Michigan, A.B., 1904 University of Pennsylvania, M.D., 1908; Harvard University, A.M., 1910 University of Colorado Boulder, Oph.D., 1918

Academic work
- Discipline: Ophthalmology
- Sub-discipline: Aviation medicine and trachoma

Harvey James Howard (January 30, 1880 – November 6, 1956) was an American ophthalmologist and academic. Howard specialized in aviation medicine and trachoma. He was the founding chair of the Department of Ophthalmology at Washington University School of Medicine and head of the Department of Ophthalmology at Canton Christian College. He was also a founding member of Acacia collegiate fraternity.

== Early life ==
Howard was born on January 30, 1880, in Churchville, New York. He attended the University of Michigan where he was a founding member of Acacia fraternity. He graduated in 1904 with an A.B.

He attended the University of Pennsylvania, graduating with an M.D. in 1908. He graduated from Harvard University with a Master of Arts. in 1910. He also earned an Oph.D. from the University of Colorado Boulder in 1918.

== Career ==
Howard was a resident physician at Bryn Mawr Hospital in 1908 and a resident ophthalmic surgeon at the New York Eye and Ear Infirmary from 1909 to 1910. He accepted a position as head of the Ophthalmology Department at the University Medical School, Canton Christian College in China between 1910 and 1915. He received a Rockefeller Foundation fellowship to study ophthalmologic pathology at Harvard University from 1916 to 1918. He was elected to the American Ophthalmological Society in 1917.

During World War I, he invented the Howard-Dolman apparatus for measuring the accuracy of perception of distance for aviators while serving as a captain in the United States Army Medical Corps during World War I.

Howard returned to China where he served as head of the Department of Ophthalmology at Peking Union Medical College between 1917 and 1927. While there, he organized a teaching program and studied epithelial cells. He was also the ophthalmologist of Puyi, the boy emperor in the Forbidden City, between 1921 and 1925.

He was a fellow at the University of Vienna from 1923 to 1924. He was the founding chair of the Department of Ophthalmology at Washington University School of Medicine in 1927. He oversaw the construction of a new building for ophthalmology, developed a resident training program, and conducted research on aviation medicine and trachoma of Indians.

Howard was the medical director of the Missouri Commission for the Blind from 1931 to 1948. In 1934, Howard left academia and opened a private practice in St. Louis, with offices in the Park Plaza Hotel.

Howard was a colonel in the medical reserve corps during World War II.

== Professional affiliations ==
Howard was a fellow of the American College of Surgeons and the American Medical Association. He was a member of the American Academy of Ophthalmology and Otolaryngology, the American Ophthalmological Society, the Florida Medical Association, and the Southern Medical Association.

== Personal life ==
Howard married Maude Irene Strobel in Philadelphia on June 25, 1910. They had three children. After Maude died in 1948, he married Alice Tilson Eastes.

In 1926, Howard and his son were kidnapped by Manchurian bandits who demanded a $100,000 ransom ($1,818,609 in today's money). They escaped after ten weeks (77 days) with the help of the Chinese army. Howard wrote of the event in his book Ten Weeks with Chinese Bandits, which was published in seven languages.

Howard was a member of the American Legion and served on the board of the Washington University Branch of the Y.M.C.A. He was a member and president of St. Louis Kiwanis, the St. Louis Writers Guild, and the Society of St. Louis Authors. He was also chairman of the St. Louis Chapter of United China Relief.

Howard died in the hospital of November 6, 1956 in Clearwater, Florida.
