= Boulevard Émile Jacqmain =

Thoroughfare in Brussels, Belgium

Boulevard Émile Jacqmain (French); Émile Jacqmainlaan (Dutch)
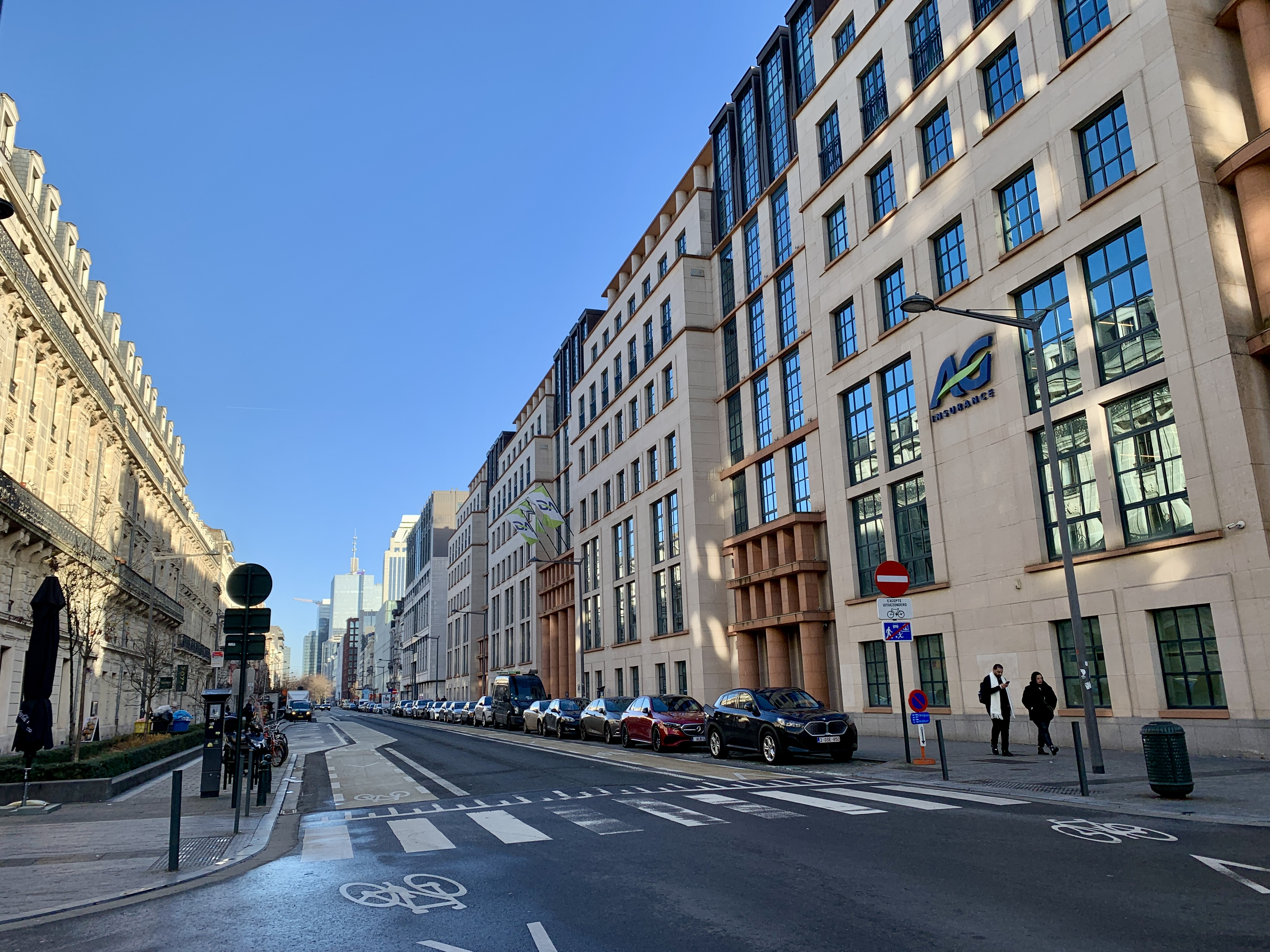
- The Boulevard Émile Jacqmain/Émile Jacqmainlaan in Brussels

- Location within Brussels Location within Belgium
- Former names: Boulevard de la Senne (French); Zennelaan (Dutch)
- Part of: Central Boulevards of Brussels
- Namesake: Émile Jacqmain
- Type: Boulevard
- Location: City of Brussels, Brussels-Capital Region, Belgium
- Quarter: Marais–Jacqmain Quarter
- Postal code: 1000
- Coordinates: 50°51′15″N 4°21′15″E

Construction
- Completed: 1868–1871

Other
- Designer: Léon Suys

The Boulevard Émile Jacqmain (French) or Émile Jacqmainlaan (Dutch) is a central boulevard in Brussels, Belgium. It was created following the covering of the river Senne (1867–1871), and bears the name of Émile Jacqmain, a former Alderman for Public Education.

The Boulevard Émile Jacqmain connects the Place de Brouckère/De Brouckèreplein to the Boulevard du Jardin botanique/Kruidtuinlaan and the Boulevard d'Anvers/Antwerpselaan, in the extension of the Boulevard Anspach/Anspachlaan. This area is served by the metro and premetro (underground tram) stations De Brouckère (on lines 1, 4, 5 and 10) and Rogier (on lines 2, 4, 6 and 10). Its northern section from the Boulevard Baudouin/Boudewijnlaan to the Place Gaucheret/Gaucheretplein was renamed the Boulevard du Roi Albert II/Koning Albert II-laan in 1999.

== History ==
The Boulevard Émile Jacqmain was laid out between 1868 and 1871, as part of the Central Boulevards, which were created after the covering of the river Senne. The boulevard was originally named the Boulevard de la Senne/Zennelaan ("Senne Boulevard") because it follows the course of the river. In 1919, it was renamed in honour of the liberal politician and Alderman for Public Education, Émile Jacqmain (1860–1933), who had been arrested and subsequently deported by the Germans in 1917.

During the 20th century, many daily newspapers had their offices on the Boulevard Émile Jacqmain, including De Standaard, Het Laatste Nieuws and Het Nieuwsblad. Journalistic activity also took place at the rear in the Rue Saint-Pierre/Sint-Pietersstraat, where La Libre Belgique and La Dernière Heure, among others, were based. The Flemish newspapers moved out in the 1980s, and La Libre Belgique was the last to leave in 2006.

== See also ==
- List of streets in Brussels
- History of Brussels
- Belgium in the long nineteenth century
