= Annales d'oculistique =

French optometry journal (1838–1977)

- Discipline: Medicine, Ophthalmology
- Language: French

Publication details
- Former name(s): Annales d'oculistique et de gynécologie
- History: 1838–1977

Standard abbreviations
- ISO 4: Ann. Ocul.

Indexing
- ISSN: 0003-4371
- OCLC no.: 1481314

Annales d'oculistique (English: Annals of Ophthalmology) was a French medical journal, founded in the 19th century. It was the first-ever published journal specifically devoted to ophthalmology.

== History ==
The medical journal was established by Belgian ophthalmologist Dr. Florent Cunier of Brussels and began publication in August 1838, with the help of Martin Schoenfeld.

Originally published as Annales d'oculistique et de gynécologie, the editors chose to separate the specialties, and from September 1839, it was renamed Annales d'oculistique, the first optometry-based journal.

The editor-in-chief collaborated internationally, engaging with Belgian and foreign doctors including colleagues from Austria, Bavaria, France, Holland, Saxe, and Switzerland. In 1840, the third volume was published at 52 Rue du Marché aux Poulets in Brussels, Belgium. During the 1840s, it was distributed in monthly installments, with an annual subscription priced at 14 francs.

In 1852, the publishing offices were situated at 22 Rue des Comédiens in Brussels and 17 Rue de l'École-de-Médecine in Paris.

In April 1853, the founder Cunier passed away and management was transferred over. At this time, Dr. Évariste Warlomont became Editor-in-chief of the French optometry journal. The journal's editorial board consisted of Warlomont, Belgian physician Dr. Louis S. Fallot, Dr. J. Bosch, Dr. F. Hairion, and Dr. J. Van Roosbroeck. In Brussels, the offices of the Annales d'oculistique were based at 27 Rue Notre Dame aux Neiges.

The idea of the first ever International Ophthalmological Congress was realized by Dr. Warlomont and the editorial board. The journal called on ophthalmologists and physicians working in the field on 15 January 1857.

Following the death of Évariste Warlomont in the early 1890s, Victor Morax assumed the position of the Editor-in-chief until 1935.

The publication lasted until 1977, after which it combined with Archives d'Ophtalmologie to form the Journal Français d'Ophtalmologie.
