= List of streets in Brussels =

This is a list of streets in the Brussels-Capital Region, Belgium:

- Boulevard Adolphe Max
- Rue d'Aerschot
- Avenue Albert
- Chaussée d'Alsemberg
- Boulevard Anspach
- Rue Antoine Dansaert
- Boulevard Auguste Reyers
- Rue du Bailli
- Rue Belliard
- Boulevard Brand Whitlock
- Avenue Brugmann
- Boulevard du Centenaire
- Chaussée de Charleroi
- Avenue Charles Quint
- Avenue des Croix du Feu
- Avenue De Fré
- Boulevard de Smet de Naeyer
- Boulevard Edmond Machtens
- Boulevard Émile Jacqmain
- Boulevard de l'Empereur
- Avenue de l'Exposition
- Avenue de l'Exposition Universelle
- Avenue Fonsny
- Avenue Franklin Roosevelt
- Chaussée de Gand
- Boulevard Général Jacques
- Boulevard Général Wahis
- Rue des Guildes
- Chaussée de Haecht
- Avenue Houba de Strooper
- Boulevard de l'Impératrice
- Boulevard Industriel
- Chaussée d'Ixelles
- Boulevard du Jardin botanique
- Avenue de Jette
- Chaussée de Jette
- Chaussée de La Hulpe
- Boulevard Lambermont
- Boulevard Léopold II
- Avenue Léopold III
- Rue de la Loi
- Boulevard Louis Mettewie
- Boulevard Louis Schmidt
- Avenue Louise
- Chaussée de Louvain
- Boulevard Maurice Lemonnier
- Rue du Marché aux Fromages
- Rue du Midi
- Chaussée de Mons
- Rue Neuve
- Chaussée de Ninove
- Boulevard Pachéco
- Boulevard Paepsem
- Avenue du Parc
- Avenue du Parc Royal
- Boulevard de la Plaine
- Boulevard Prince de Liège
- Avenue de la Reine
- Avenue de Roodebeek
- Rue Royale
- Boulevard Saint-Michel
- Boulevard du Souverain
- Rue de Stalle
- Boulevard Sylvain Dupuis
- Avenue de Tervueren
- Boulevard du Triomphe
- Quai des Usines
- Avenue Van Praet
- Avenue Van Volxem
- Rue Victor Hugo
- Avenue de Vilvorde
- Chaussée de Vleurgat
- Chaussée de Waterloo
- Chaussée de Wavre
- Avenue Wielemans Ceuppens
- Avenue Winston Churchill
- Boulevard de la Woluwe
