= Évariste Warlomont =

Belgian ophthalmologist (1820-1891)

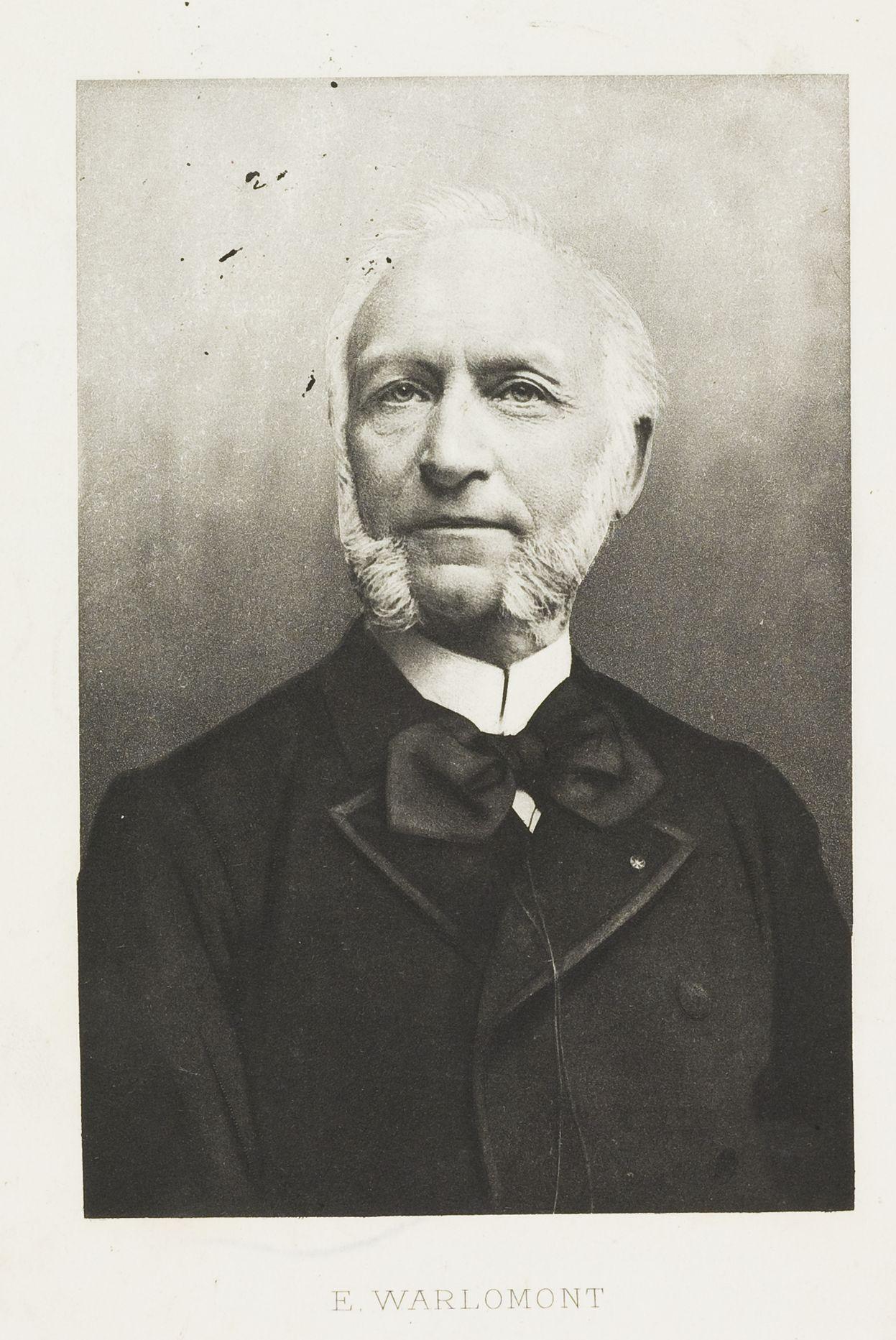
- Born: Jean-Charles Évariste Warlomont; 26 November 1820; Aubel, Liège, Belgium, Kingdom of the Netherlands
- Died: 22 January 1891 (aged 70); Brussels, Belgium
- Education: State University of Leuven
- Occupations: Ophthalmologist; Physician; Microbiologist
- Awards: Order of Leopold; Legion of Honor; Order of Saint Stanislaus; Order of Isabella the Catholic

Évariste Warlomont (26 November 1820 — 22 January 1891), also referred to as Jean-Charles Évariste Warlomont, was a Belgian ophthalmologist, physician, and microbiologist. He was the first to establish animal vaccination in Belgium.

== Biography ==
=== Early life and education ===
Jean-Charles Évariste Warlomont was born in Aubel, Liège, Belgium on 26 November 1820. After studying Humanities at the Athénée de Luxembourg in Luxembourg, he returned to his family in Belgium in 1838. Évariste Warlomont later studied at the State University of Leuven, graduating with a Doctor of Medicine.

=== Career ===
==== Military physician ====
After studying medicine in Leuven, J. C. Évariste Warlomont became a military physician in 1844. Under a Belgian ophthalmologist named Jean Fierens, he studied trachoma, an infectious eye disease that affected many soldiers in the Belgian army.

==== Ophthalmological journalism ====
He resigned from the army in 1852, around the time of his marriage. Warlomont turned his focus to ophthalmological science, learning from Belgian ophthalmologist Dr. Florent Cunier, who founded the international optometry journal Annales d'oculistique. He also met and engaged in various studies and projects with a young ophthalmologist named Dr. Testelin. After Dr. Florent Cunier died in 1853, Évariste Warlomont took over as editor-in-chief of Annales d'oculistique.

==== Ophthalmologist ====
Between 1852 and 1866, he treated eye diseases at the Brabant Ophthalmological Institute and engaged in ophthalmological journalism. He accepted a seat on the Board of the Institute in Brussels and was appointed as the King of Belgium, Leopold I's ophthalmologist.

His 1854 presentation to the Royal Academy of Science, Letters and Fine Arts of Belgium (French: Académie royale des Sciences, des Lettres et des Beaux-Arts de Belgique) was on the history of pannus and was titled Du Pannus et de son traitement.

In 1856, he worked on the French translation and volume two of Practical Treatise of the Diseases of the Eye (French: Traité Pratique des Maladies de l'Oeil), a textbook by Scottish ophthalmologist William Mackenzie.

After publishing an invitation via the Annales d'oculistique, the editor-in-chief organized a special ophthalmological congress. In 1857, he convened the first-ever International Congress of Ophthalmology, a conference in Brussels with over 150 ophthalmologists in attendance. He served as the general-secretary of the First International Ophthalmological Congress.

==== Vaccinologist ====
With the introduction of animal vaccines by Dr. Lanoix in France, he shifted his attention towards public hygiene and vaccinations, even though his practice had no direct connection. He founded a vaccination service as a private enterprise in January 1865 called The State Vaccine Institute (French: L'Institut Vaccinale de l'Etat).

In 1865, he wrote a piece addressing the state's duties toward the widows and orphans of doctors who perished due to their commitment during Belgian pandemics, including the 1863–1875 cholera pandemic.

The Belgian Government established its own vaccination institute in 1868, The Vaccination Institute of Belgium (French: L'Institut Vaccinal de Belgique), and hired Dr. Warlomont, who continued his work at both institutes. He served as director of the Vaccination Institute in Brussels (which existed until 1892). Notably, the institution revaccinated the Queen of England and her family members. Before 1871, Warlomont had administered vaccines to 10,000 people.

In 1869, he wrote the obituary of Dr. Frédéric Jules Sichel.

==== Institute Director ====
From 1869 to 1883, he served as the director of the Brabant Ophthalmological Institute. During his directorship of the Royal Institution of Belgium, he was a corresponding member of the International Academies of Medicine. He wrote to the National Academy of Medicine of Paris to address the preservation of animal vaccine matter in 1870. Dr. Warlomont presented a study on his prophylactic vaccine for smallpox at the Academy of Medicine in Belgium in 1871.

He published a scientific study on the cataract in 1872, titled Of The Cataract (French: De La Cataracte).

On 19 January 1877, he informed the British Medical Journal that many English doctors were seeking animal vaccines from the State Vaccine Institute (French: Institut vaccinal de l'Etat) in Brussels.

By 1883, he served as President of the Central Examination Board for Medicine. He was also distinguished as a Knight of the Order of Leopold, Officer of the Legion of Honor, and Commander of the Order of Saint Stanislaus and Order of Isabella the Catholic. During this year, he wrote Traité de la vaccine et de la vaccination humaine et animale, published in Paris.

After being expelled from the institute in 1883, he promptly established a new ophthalmology institute in Italy's Sanremo called the International Institute for Eye Diseases.

A Manual of Animal Vaccination: Preceded by Considerations on Vaccination in General, written by him, was translated and published in English in 1886, detailing the results of re-vaccination and the benefits of animal vaccination.

==== Royal Academy of Medicine ====
During the mid-1880s, Dr. Warlomont, previously vice president of the Royal Academy of Medicine of Belgium, held a tenured position at the academy. Warlomont held a corresponding membership with the National Academy of Medicine (French: Académie Nationale de Médecine) in Paris, France and was elected chairman in 1886. Warlomont was appointed foreign correspondent for the Academy of Medicine's Anatomy and Physiology Division on 30 April 1889.

== Death ==
Jean-Charles Évariste Warlomont died on 22 January 1891 in Brussels, Belgium.
