= James C. Tsai =

American ophthalmologist

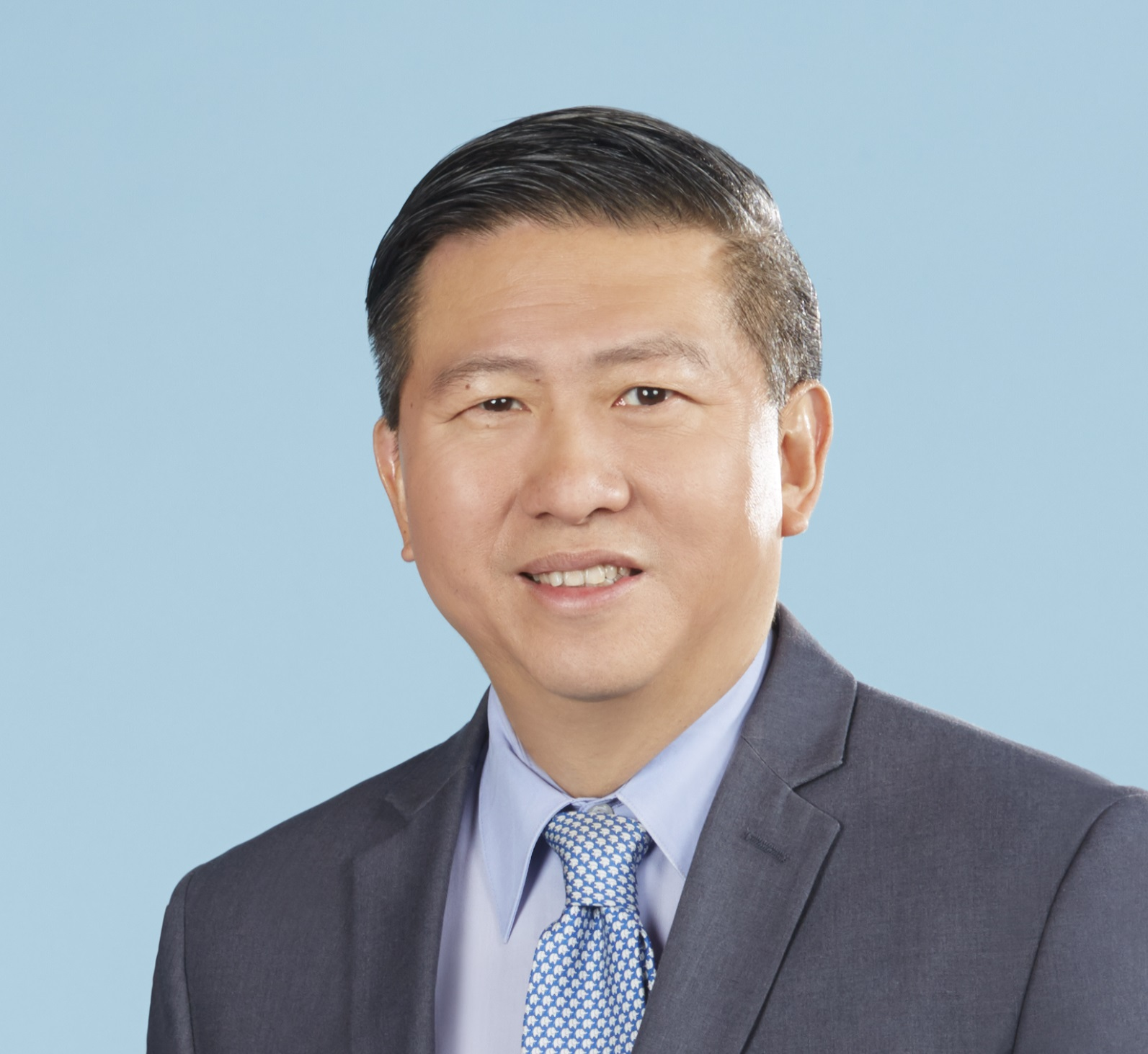
- Born: Taiwan
- Education: Amherst College; Stanford University School of Medicine; Owen Graduate School of Management, Vanderbilt University
- Known for: Glaucoma research; ophthalmology leadership
- Medical career
- Profession: Ophthalmologist
- Institutions: Vanderbilt University School of Medicine; Columbia University Vagelos College of Physicians and Surgeons; Yale School of Medicine; New York Eye and Ear Infirmary of Mount Sinai; Icahn School of Medicine at Mount Sinai
- Sub-specialties: Glaucoma and glaucoma surgery
- Website: profiles.mountsinai.org/james-tsai

James C. Tsai is a Taiwan-born American ophthalmologist, glaucoma specialist, and academic medical administrator. He is president of the New York Eye and Ear Infirmary of Mount Sinai, Delafield-Rodgers Professor of Ophthalmology, and system chair of ophthalmology at the Icahn School of Medicine at Mount Sinai and the Mount Sinai Health System. He is also founding director of the Barry Family Center for Ophthalmic Artificial Intelligence and Human Health at Icahn Mount Sinai.

Tsai previously served as chair of the Department of Ophthalmology and Visual Science at Yale School of Medicine and chief of ophthalmology at Yale New Haven Hospital. In 2026, he became president of the Association of University Professors of Ophthalmology.

Tsai's glaucoma research has included a systematic taxonomy of medication adherence barriers, development and evaluation of isolated-check visual evoked potential technology for glaucoma patients, and early animal-model studies of erythropoietin as a potential neuroprotective agent.

== Early life and education ==
Tsai was born in Taiwan and moved to the United States with his family in 1968 . He attended public schools in New York and Pennsylvania before graduating from Phillips Exeter Academy.

Tsai earned a bachelor's degree from Amherst College and an M.D. from Stanford University School of Medicine. He later received an M.B.A. from the Owen Graduate School of Management at Vanderbilt University. He completed an ophthalmology residency at the Doheny Eye Institute of the University of Southern California, followed by glaucoma fellowships at the Bascom Palmer Eye Institute of the University of Miami and at Moorfields Eye Hospital and the Institute of Ophthalmology in London.

== Career ==
Tsai held academic and clinical leadership positions at Vanderbilt University School of Medicine, Columbia University Vagelos College of Physicians and Surgeons, and Yale School of Medicine before joining Mount Sinai. His earlier roles included directing glaucoma programs at Columbia's Edward S. Harkness Eye Institute and chairing Yale's Department of Ophthalmology and Visual Science, where he also served as chief of ophthalmology at Yale New Haven Hospital.

In 2014, Tsai was appointed president of the New York Eye and Ear Infirmary of Mount Sinai and chair of ophthalmology for the Mount Sinai Health System. At Mount Sinai, he holds the Delafield-Rodgers Professorship of Ophthalmology and oversees ophthalmology across the health system.

Tsai has also held leadership roles in ophthalmology education and professional organizations. He served as president of the International Joint Commission on Allied Health Personnel in Ophthalmology from 2021 to 2023. In 2026, Tsai became president of the Association of University Professors of Ophthalmology for the April 1, 2026–March 31, 2027 term. He is also listed as a member of the Board of Trustees of the International Council of Ophthalmology.

== Research ==
Tsai's research has focused on glaucoma, including medication adherence, surgical outcomes, neuroprotection, visual function testing, telehealth, and ophthalmic applications of artificial intelligence.

One area of Tsai's work has been medication adherence among patients with glaucoma. In 2003, Tsai and colleagues published a study in the Journal of Glaucoma that systematically classified common barriers to glaucoma medication adherence. A later review by Tsai in Ophthalmology described the resulting taxonomy as grouping adherence barriers into medication-regimen, patient, provider, and situational or environmental factors.

Tsai has also worked on visual-function testing in glaucoma, including isolated-check visual evoked potential technology. A 2006 article in Review of Ophthalmology described Tsai as involved with the technology from the beginning of Phase I clinical studies. In 2008, Tsai co-authored a Documenta Ophthalmologica paper introducing a rapid electrophysiological technique for assessing magnocellular visual-function deficits associated with glaucoma.

His neuroprotection research has included studies of erythropoietin in experimental glaucoma. In a 2005 Current Eye Research study, Tsai and co-authors reported preservation of retinal ganglion cells after intravitreal erythropoietin administration in a rat model of glaucoma. In a 2007 review, Tsai and co-authors described erythropoietin as a candidate neuroprotective agent in glaucoma while noting that further studies were needed to evaluate safety and efficacy.

Tsai has also published studies comparing glaucoma drainage implants, including Ahmed and Baerveldt shunts.

His later work includes telemedicine, digital health, and ophthalmic applications of artificial intelligence. In 2023, New York Eye and Ear Infirmary of Mount Sinai launched the Center for Ophthalmic Artificial Intelligence and Human Health, a partnership with the Windreich Department of Artificial Intelligence and Human Health at Icahn Mount Sinai. In 2024, the center was renamed the Barry Family Center for Ophthalmic Artificial Intelligence and Human Health after a $5 million gift from the John and Daria Barry Foundation; Mount Sinai described Tsai as the center's inaugural director. A 2024 study co-authored by Tsai reported a remote-consult protocol using point-of-care optical coherence tomography for diagnosis of retinal artery occlusions in emergency settings.

== Selected publications ==
- Tsai, James C.; Denniston, Alastair K. O.; Murray, Philip I.; Huang, John J.; Aldad, Tamir S. (2011). Oxford American Handbook of Ophthalmology. Oxford University Press. ISBN 9780195393446.
- Tsai, James C. (2018). Medical Management of Glaucoma (4th ed.). West Islip, New York: Professional Communications. ISBN 9781943236121.
- Sivak-Callcott, Jennifer A.; O'Day, Denis M.; Gass, J. Donald M.; Tsai, James C. (2001). "Evidence-based recommendations for the diagnosis and treatment of neovascular glaucoma". Ophthalmology. 108 (10): 1767–1776. doi:10.1016/S0161-6420(01)00775-8. PMID 11581047.
- Bloom, P. A.; Tsai, J. C.; Sharma, K.; Miller, M. H.; Rice, N. S.; Hitchings, R. A.; Khaw, P. T. (1997). "Cyclodiode: trans-scleral diode laser cyclophotocoagulation in the treatment of advanced refractory glaucoma". Ophthalmology. 104 (9): 1508–1520. doi:10.1016/S0161-6420(97)30109-2. PMID 9307649.
- Saleem, Sarah M.; Pasquale, Louis R.; Sidoti, Paul A.; Tsai, James C. (2020). "Virtual ophthalmology: telemedicine in a COVID-19 era". American Journal of Ophthalmology. 216: 237–242. doi:10.1016/j.ajo.2020.04.029. PMC 7191296. PMID 32360862.
- Wong, Sharon H.; Tsai, James C. (2021). "Telehealth and screening strategies in the diagnosis and management of glaucoma". Journal of Clinical Medicine. 10 (16): 3452. doi:10.3390/jcm10163452. PMC 8396962. PMID 34441748.
- Kamthan, Gautam; Meenink, Thijs; Morgan, Isabella C.; Harvey, Andrew A.; Lince, Jorge L.; Smit, Jorrit; Beelen, Maarten; Tsai, James C.; de Smet, Marc D.; Ianchulev, Tsoncho (2024). "Microinterventional system for robot-assisted gonioscopic surgery: technical feasibility and preclinical evaluation in synthetic eye models". BMC Ophthalmology. 24 (1) 324. doi:10.1186/s12886-024-03595-3. PMC 11299419. PMID 39103788.

== Awards and honors ==
- 2013 – Distinguished Alumnus Award, Doheny Eye Institute.
- 2021 – Life Achievement Honor Award, American Academy of Ophthalmology.
- 2022 – Named to Crain's New York Business's Notable Health Care Leaders list.
- 2025 – Jacobi Medallion, Icahn School of Medicine at Mount Sinai.
