= American Ophthalmological Society =

Medical society for ophthalmologists

- Abbreviation: AOS
- Formation: 7 June 1864
- Founder: Edward Delafield
- Type: NGO
- Location: San Francisco, CA, USA
- Services: professional advancement
- Website: http://www.aosonline.org/

The American Ophthalmological Society (AOS) is a medical society of ophthalmologists and the second oldest specialty medical society in the United States, after the New York Ophthalmological Society (founded on March 7, 1864). It was founded on June 7, 1864, by 18 physicians, including Henry Drury Noyes, Daniel Bennett St. John Roosa, and Edward Delafield (its first president and also one of the founders of the New York Eye and Ear Infirmary). The society is now based in San Francisco, California. As of 2019, there are approximately 360 active members.

Admission to membership in the society is via nomination from current members and the submission of a scholarly thesis, which when approved are published in a peer-reviewed journal, The American Journal of Ophthalmology.

A collection of the society's papers are held at the National Library of Medicine.
