= Rue Victor Hugo, Schaerbeek =

Street in Schaerbeek, Belgium

Coordinates: 50°51′01″N 4°23′41″E

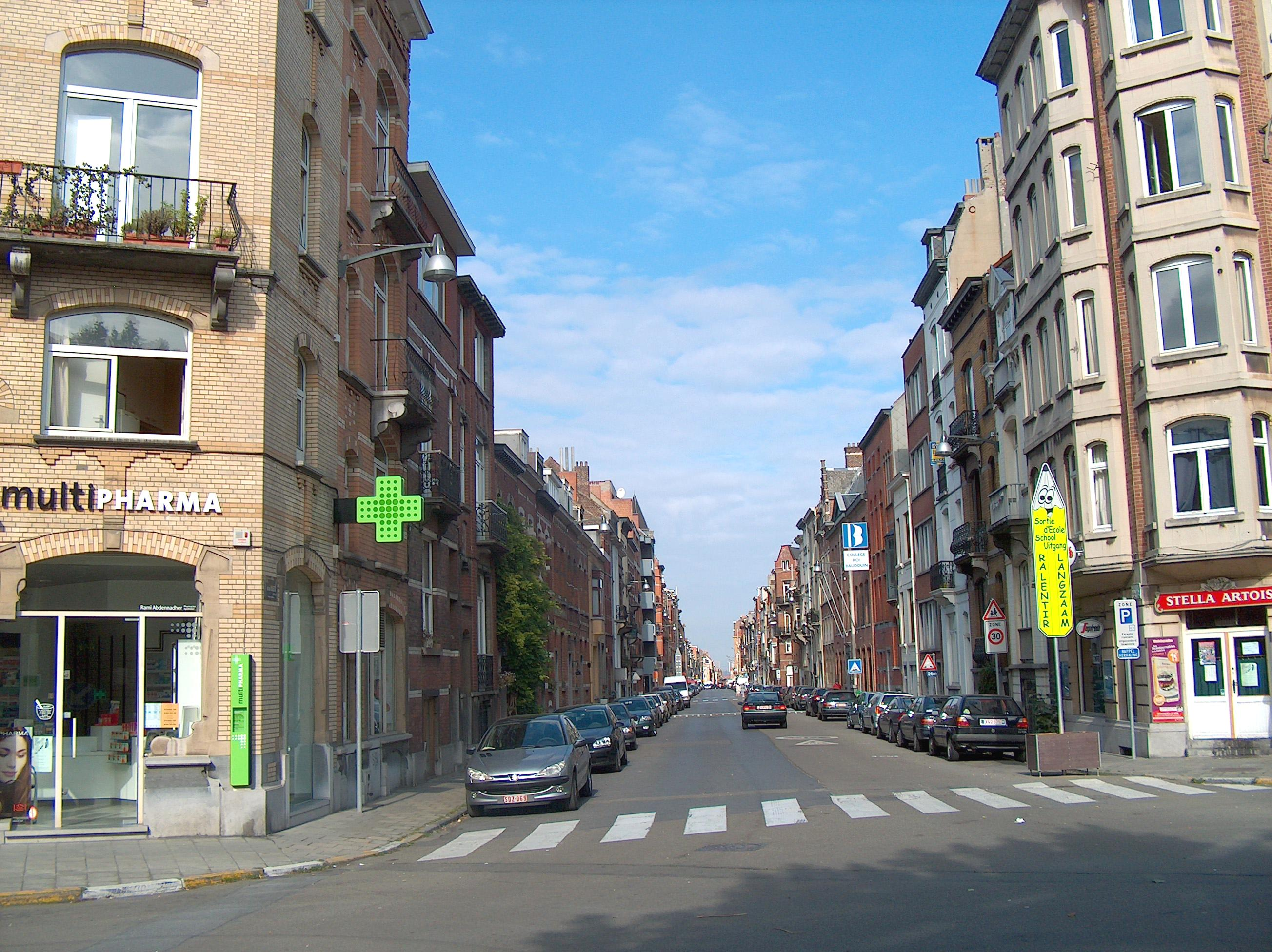
The Rue Victor Hugo/Victor Hugostraat in Schaerbeek, Brussels

The Rue Victor Hugo (French, pronounced [ʁy viktɔʁ yɡo]) or Victor Hugostraat (Dutch) is a street in the Schaerbeek municipality of Brussels, Belgium. It is named after the French writer Victor Hugo, who spent his exile of 1851 to 1870 in Brussels. It runs from the Chaussée de Louvain/Leuvense Steenweg to the Avenue de Roodebeek/Roodebeeklaan.

== Notable addresses ==
- No. 53–59: building of the Foyer Schaerbeekois/Schaarbeekse Haard, by the architect Henri Jacobs
- No. 100: Collège Roi Baudouin
- No. 147: Church of St. Albert

== See also ==
- List of streets in Brussels
- History of Brussels
- Belgium in the long nineteenth century
