= Boulevard du Jardin botanique =

Thoroughfare in Brussels, Belgium

Boulevard du Jardin botanique (French); Kruidtuinlaan (Dutch)
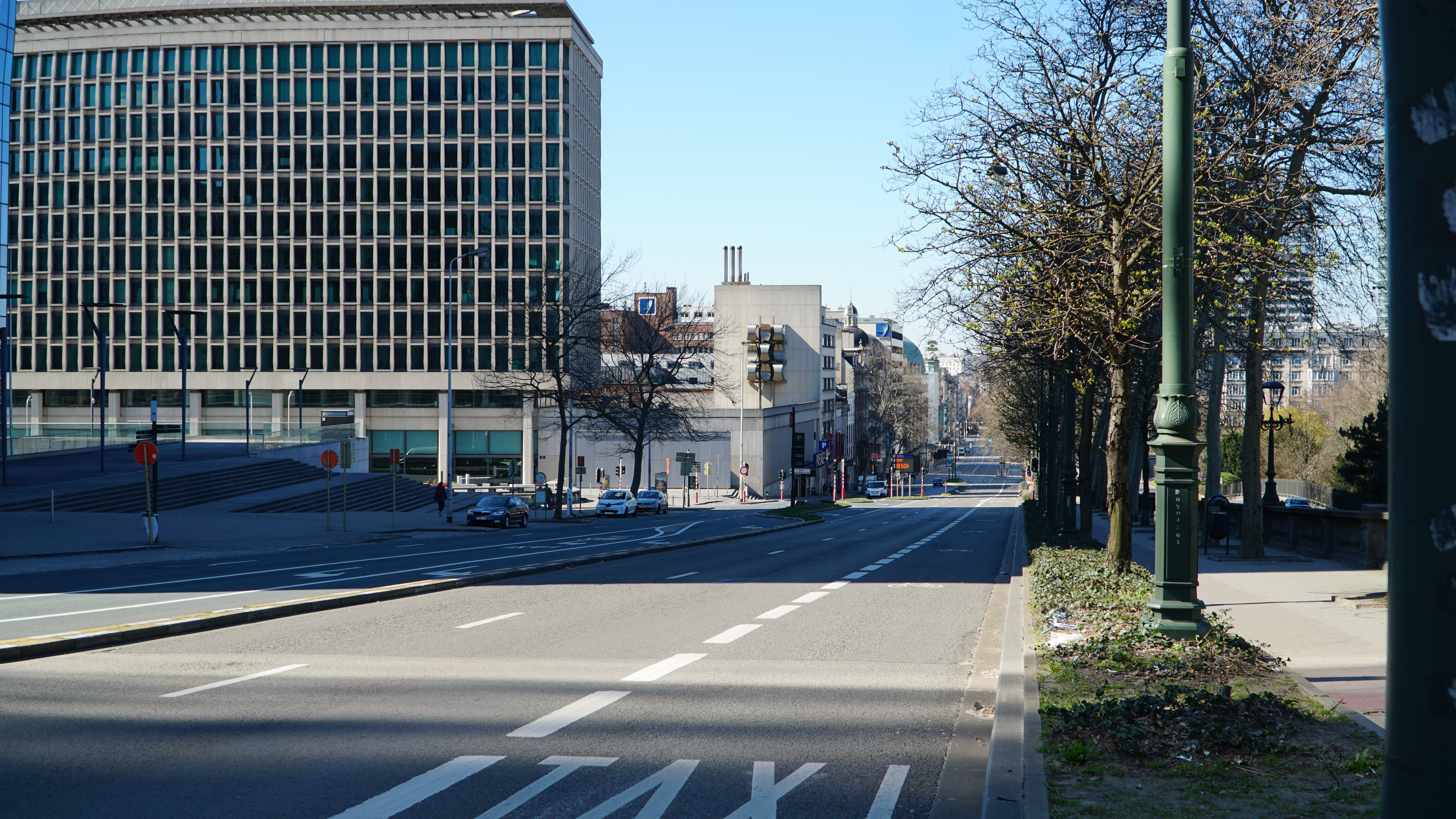
- The Boulevard du Jardin botanique/Kruidtuinlaan in Brussels

- Location within Brussels Location within Belgium
- Former names: Boulevard de Schaerbeek (French); Schaarbeekselaan (Dutch)
- Namesake: Botanical Garden of Brussels
- Type: Boulevard
- Location: Brussels-Capital Region, Belgium
- Coordinates: 50°51′44″N 4°20′04″E
- From: Boulevard Émile Jacqmain/Émile Jacqmainlaan
- To: Rue Royale/Koningsstraat

Construction
- Completion: 1818–1820

The Boulevard du Jardin botanique (French, pronounced [bulvaʁ dy ʒaʁdɛ̃ bɔtanik]) or Kruidtuinlaan (Dutch, pronounced [ˈkrœytœynˌlaːn]), meaning "Botanical Garden Boulevard", is a boulevard in the Saint-Josse-ten-Noode municipality of Brussels, Belgium. It runs from the Boulevard Émile Jacqmain/Émile Jacqmainlaan to the Rue Royale/Koningsstraat, as part of the northern section of the Small Ring (Brussels' inner ring road). This area is served by Brussels-North railway station, as well as by Botanique/Kruidtuin metro station on lines 2 and 6 of the Brussels Metro.

== History ==
=== Inception and construction ===
The Boulevard du Jardin botanique was one of the earliest boulevards in the City of Brussels, completed from 1818 to 1820, according to the plans of the architect J.B. Vifquain. It was first called the Boulevard de Schaerbeek/Schaarbeekselaan ("Schaerbeek Boulevard") in tribute to the Schaerbeek Gate through which it passed in Saint-Josse-ten-Noode. The Schaerbeek Gate was situated at the top of the boulevard. The name of the boulevard was later changed to honour the Botanical Garden of Brussels in the mid-1800s.

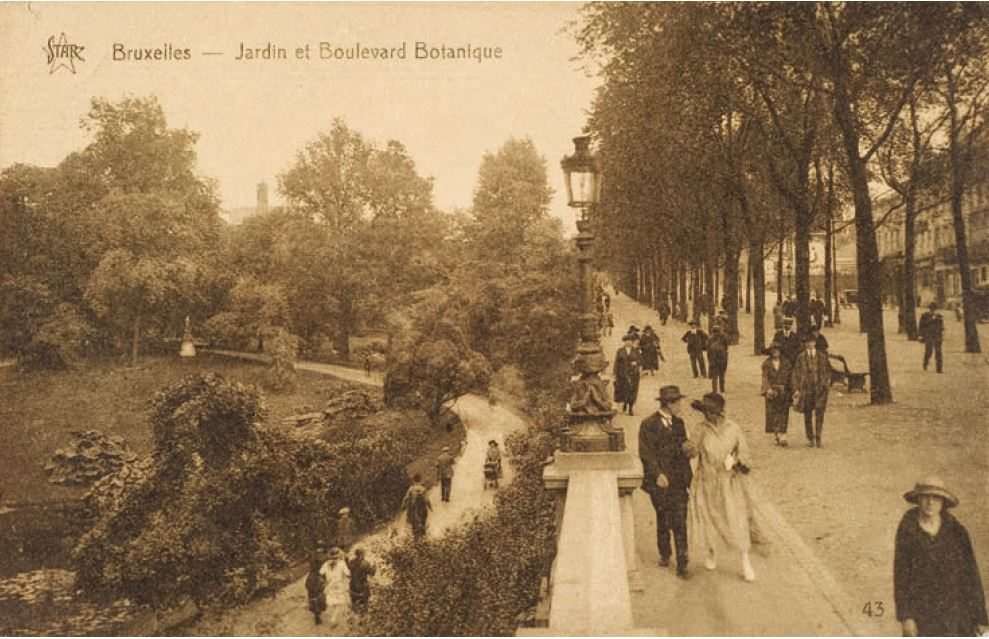
The Boulevard du Jardin botanique/Kruidtuinlaan, c. 1914

Originally, the boulevard was mainly planted with trees in its central part. It was not until 1821 that neoclassical mansions were built, surrounded by vast enclosed gardens. Later, narrower bourgeois town houses appeared. These houses brought traffic to the boulevard, as their ground floors were gradually converted into shops, restaurants, brasseries, taverns and hotels. In 1841, the boulevard became increasingly popular thanks to the construction of Brussels-North railway station. On 13 March 1842, it had a population of 194 people.

=== Early establishments ===
In 1826, the Botanical Garden of Brussels was established. The botanical building was partly designed by the architect Tilman-François Suys and the construction works, carried out between 1826 and 1829, were directed by the decorative artist Pierre-François Gineste. The original gardens were the work of the German landscape gardener Charles-Henri Petersen, later reorganised on the instructions of one of the founders of the Horticultural Society, Jean-Baptiste Meeus-Wouters. The orangery with its greenhouses, aquarium, and gardens, was inaugurated in September 1829. The high gate of the Botanical Garden opened into the Rue Royale.

The Clinique Saint-Jean's medical facility was started in 1838 and completed in 1843, across from the Botanical Garden on the Boulevard du Jardin botanique. At the time, the hospital adjoined the Saint-Louis Institute and University Faculty, housed in the hôtel particulier of Baron Jean-Jacques Verseyden. The Provincial Ophthalmic Institute of Brabant, another medical facility originally located on the Boulevard du Jardin botanique, was founded and opened on 10 September 1849.

At the intersection of the Rue Neuve/Nieuwstraat and the Boulevard du Jardin Botanique lies the Place Charles Rogier/Karel Rogierplein. The square was originally known as the Place des Nations/Natieplein ("Nations Square") or the Place de Cologne/Keulenplein ("Cologne Square"). In 1885, following the death of the liberal statesman and former Prime Minister of Belgium, Charles Rogier, it was renamed the Place Charles Rogier/Karel Rogierplein ("Charles Rogier Square") in his honour.

=== 20th-century development ===
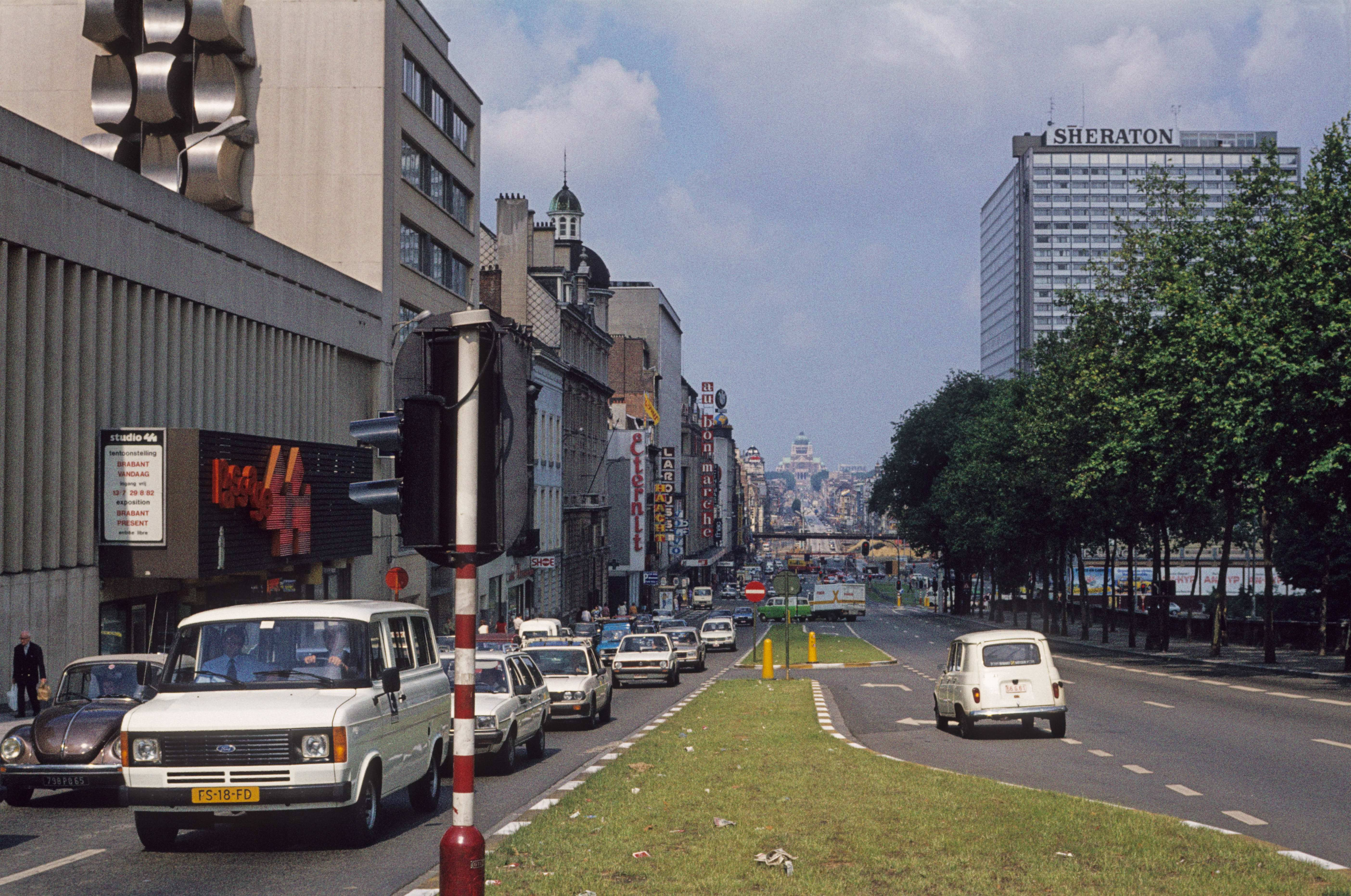
The Boulevard du Jardin botanique in the 1980s

The Boulevard du Jardin botanique underwent a significant transformation between 1949 and 1956, coinciding with the opening of the Boulevard Pachéco/Pachecolaan and the North–South connection, which involved the demolition of the original Clinique Saint-Jean. In 1956–57, the creation of the Small Ring in preparation for the 1958 Brussels World's Fair (Expo 58) led to the widening of the boulevard and the digging of an underground tunnel; during the same period, the former Rue de Schaerbeek/Schaarbeekseweg and certain buildings located to the east were removed (see Brusselisation).

In 1973, the oil crisis occurred, which also led to many changes in the municipalities of Brussels, Schaerbeek and Saint-Josse-ten-Noode around 1980. The establishment of offices was then encouraged, and the Botanical Garden district was completely renovated.

== Present day ==
The boulevard's current appearance is extremely heterogeneous: a series of original 19th-century houses alternate with 20th-century apartment buildings. There are also many office blocks and large complexes such as the former Au Bon Marché department store, Saint-Louis University, next to the new Crédit Communal building and the Passage 44 (a former shopping arcade and exhibition space), as well as the imposing State Administrative Centre (an administrative complex in the International Style) and the Finance Tower. The Botanical Garden's building is now home to a cultural complex and music venue of the French Community of Belgium, known as Le Botanique. Another remarkable building is the Botanique pharmacy, created in 1911–12 at the request of the Saint-Louis Institute. The building's eclectic architecture is typical of the time, and is the last of its kind on the boulevard.

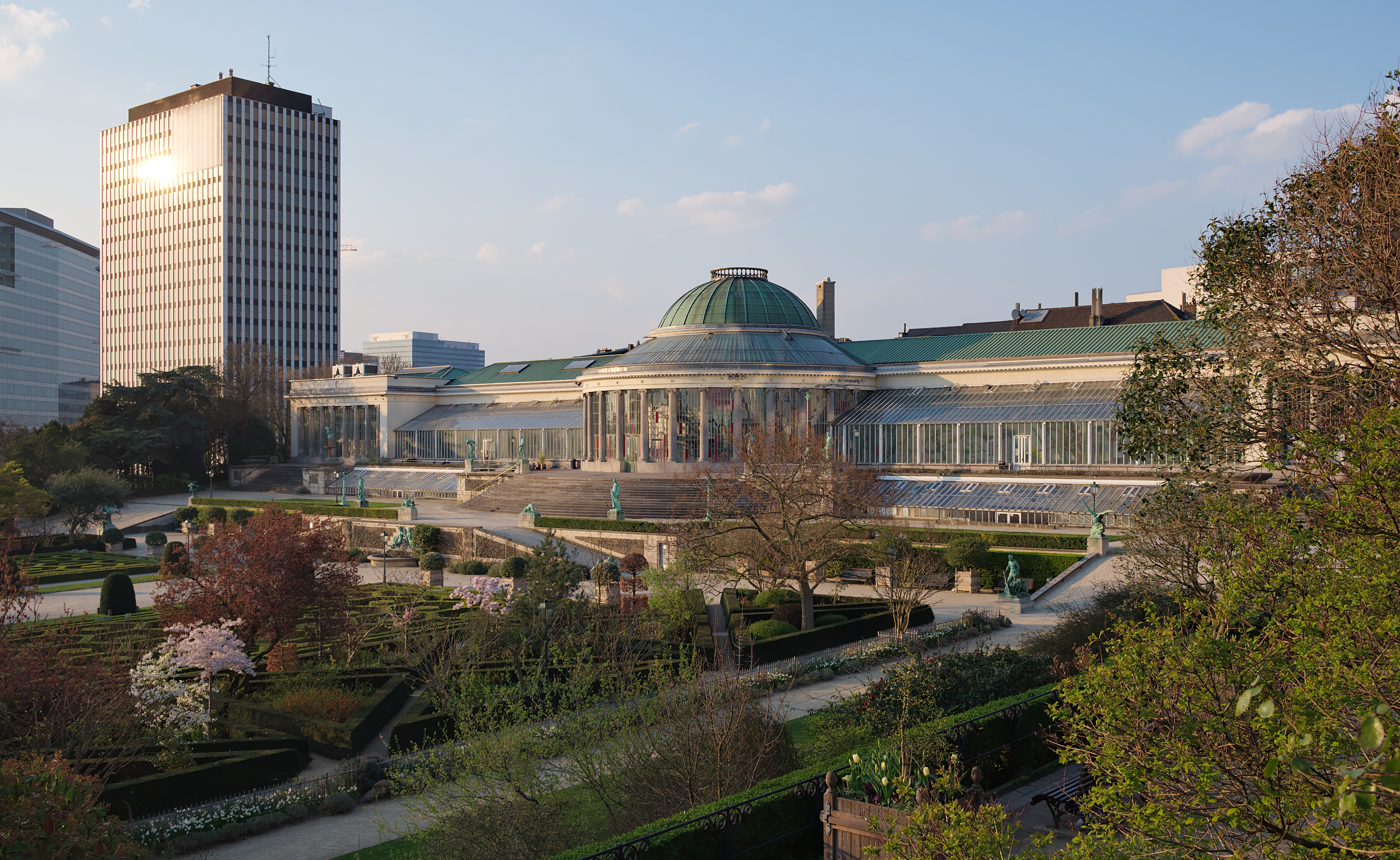
Botanical Garden (Suys, 1826–1829) and Victoria Tower (Bresseleers, 1974–1978)

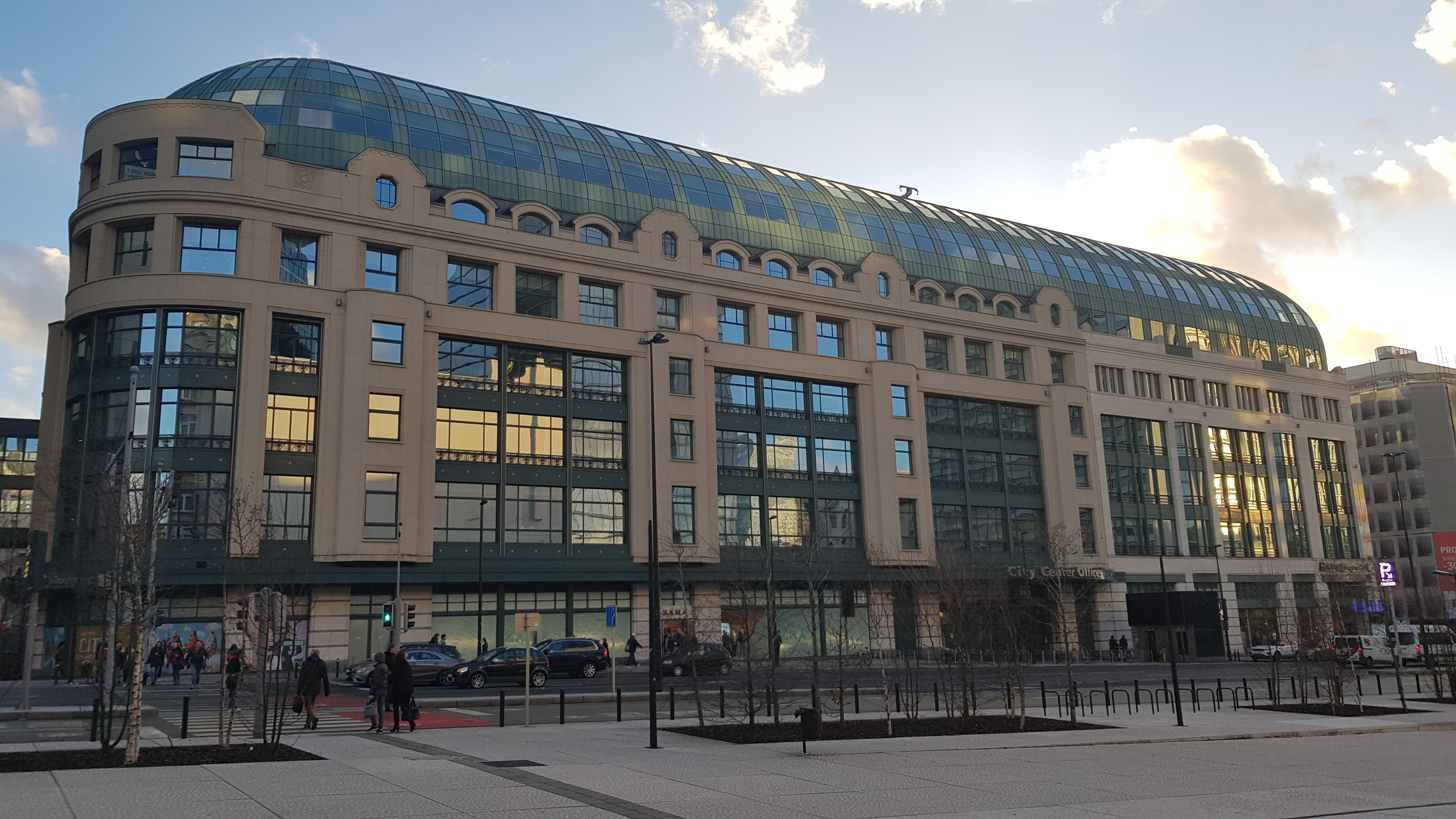
Former Au Bon Marché department store (Maugue, 1928–1930), now City 2 shopping mall

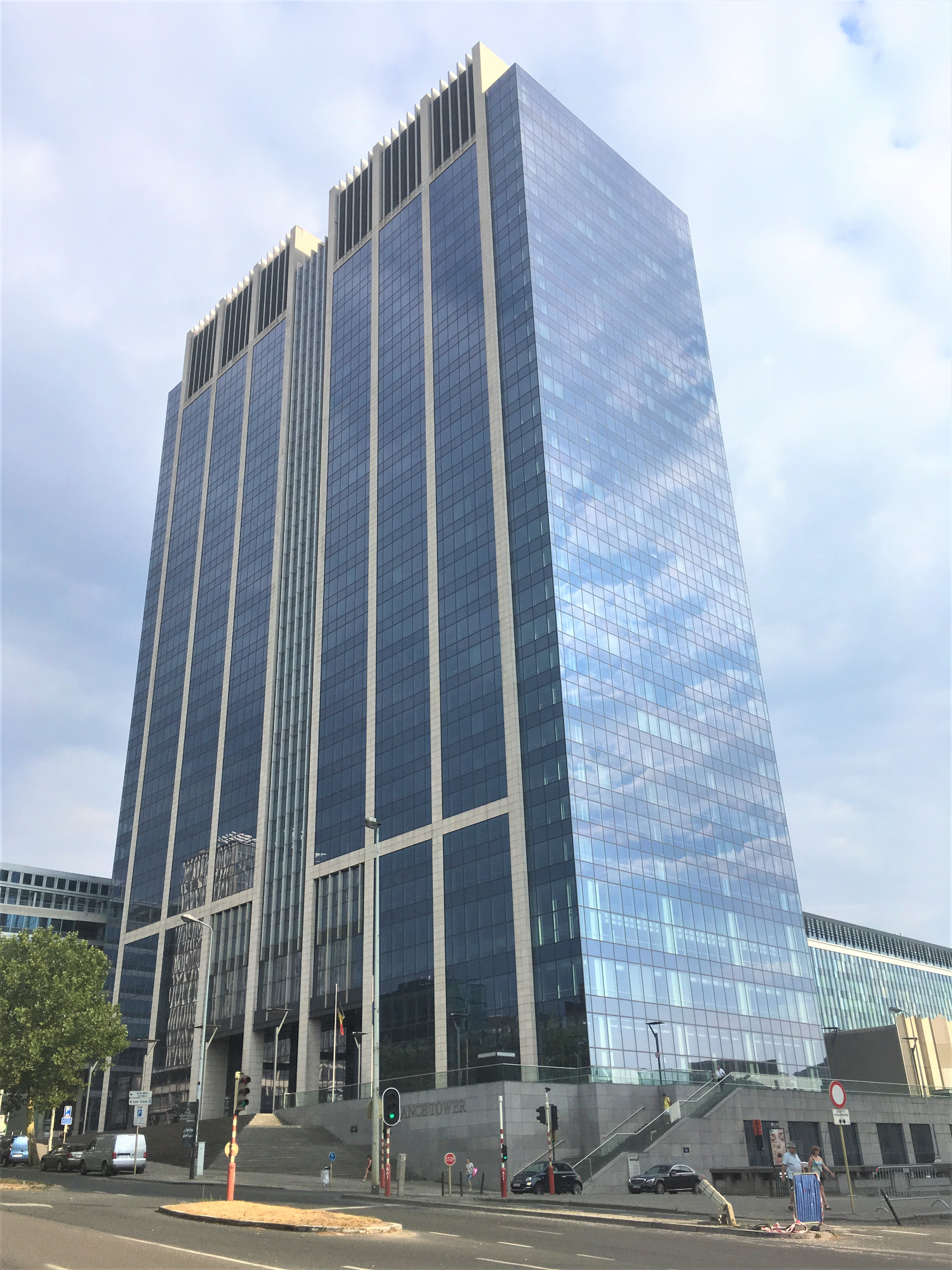
Finance Tower (Van Kuyck, Lambrichs and Stynen, 1968–1982)

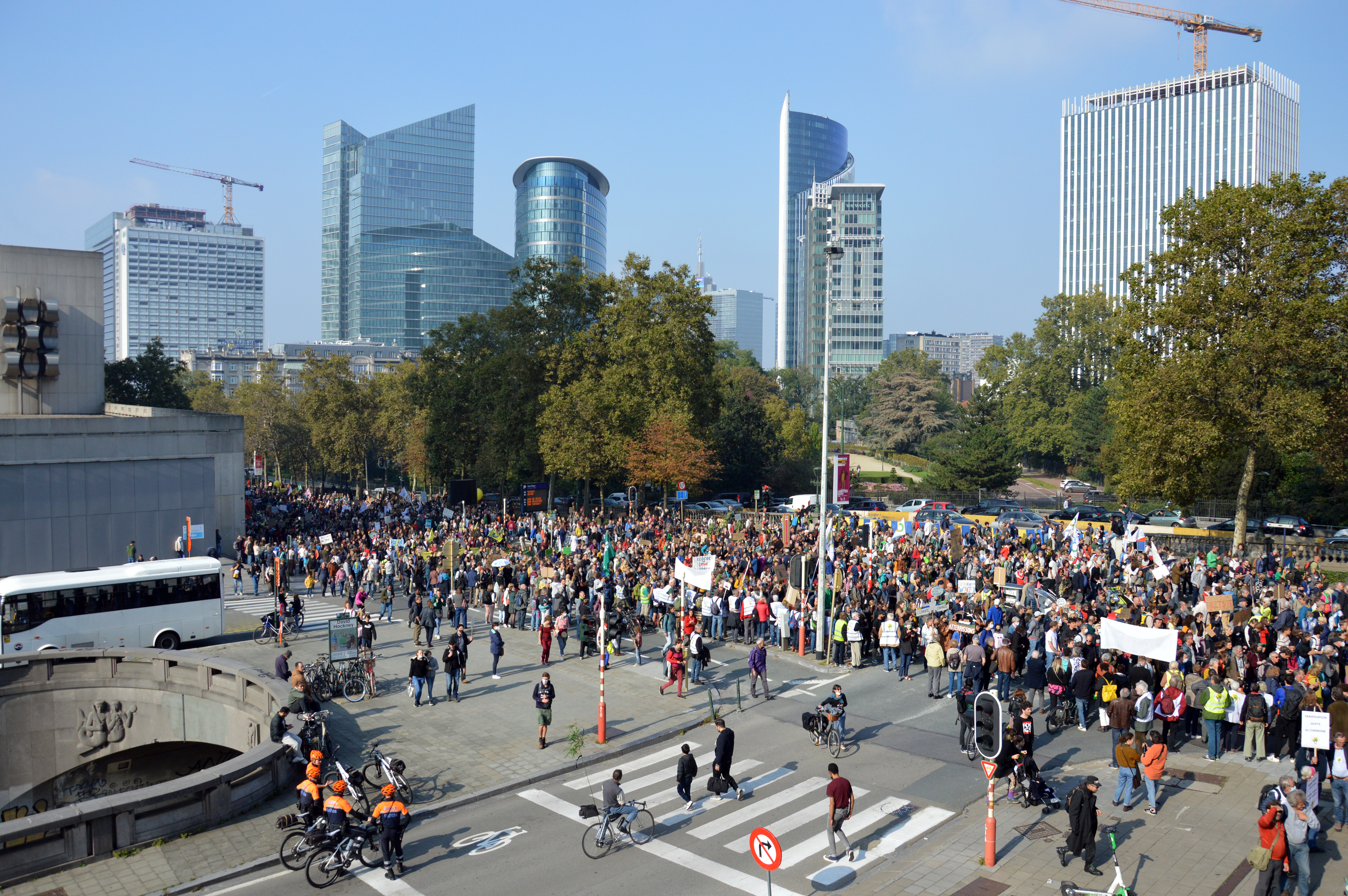
Demonstrators on the boulevard during the Back to the Climate protest, 2021

== See also ==
- List of streets in Brussels
- Le Botanique
- History of Brussels
- Belgium in the long nineteenth century
