= Clinique Saint-Jean =

Hospital in Brussels, Belgium

Clinique Saint-Jean (in French) Kliniek Sint-Jan (in Dutch)
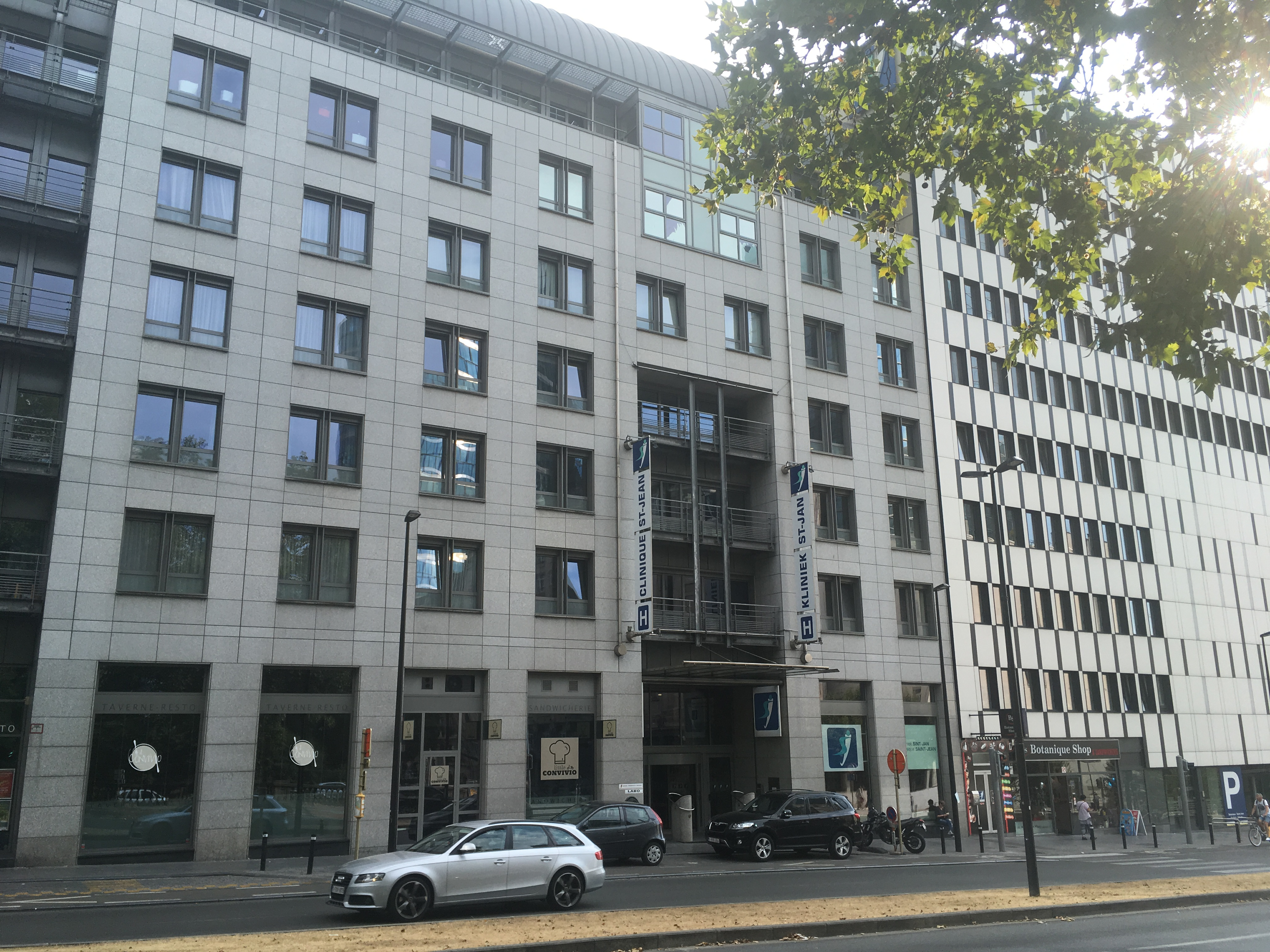
- Façade of the current Clinique Saint-Jean, Boulevard du Jardin Botanique/Kruidtuinlaan

Geography
- Location: Boulevard du Jardin Botanique / Kruidtuinlaan 32, 1000 City of Brussels, Brussels-Capital Region, Belgium
- Coordinates: 50°51′16″N 4°21′37″E

Organisation
- Care system: Private ASBL
- Type: General
- Religious affiliation: Roman Catholic
- Affiliated university: Université catholique de Louvain (UCLouvain)
- Patron: Saint John
- Network: Réseau Santé Louvain; H.uni

Services
- Emergency department: Yes
- Beds: 558

History
- Former name: Saint-Jean-op-de-Poel Hospital
- Constructed: 1851 (Botanique campus)
- Founded: 1195

Links
- Website: clstjean.be/en
- Lists: Hospitals in Belgium

The Clinique Saint-Jean (French) or Kliniek Sint-Jan (Dutch), meaning "St. John's Clinic", and historically known as the Saint-Jean-op-de-Poel Hospital, is a private non-profit general hospital in central Brussels, Belgium. Founded in 1195, it is Brussels' oldest hospital. Its medical facility was started in 1838 and completed in 1843, across from the Botanical Garden of Brussels on the Boulevard du Jardin botanique/Kruidtuinlaan.

Through the eight centuries of its existence, the Clinique Saint-Jean has been the founder of other major hospitals in the Brussels-Capital Region and of two nursing schools. It is currently part of the Réseau Santé Louvain network of the Université catholique de Louvain (UCLouvain).

== See also ==
- List of hospitals in Belgium
- Healthcare in Belgium
