= New York Eye and Ear Infirmary =

Coordinates: 40.732758°N 73.984283°W

- Mount Sinai Health System

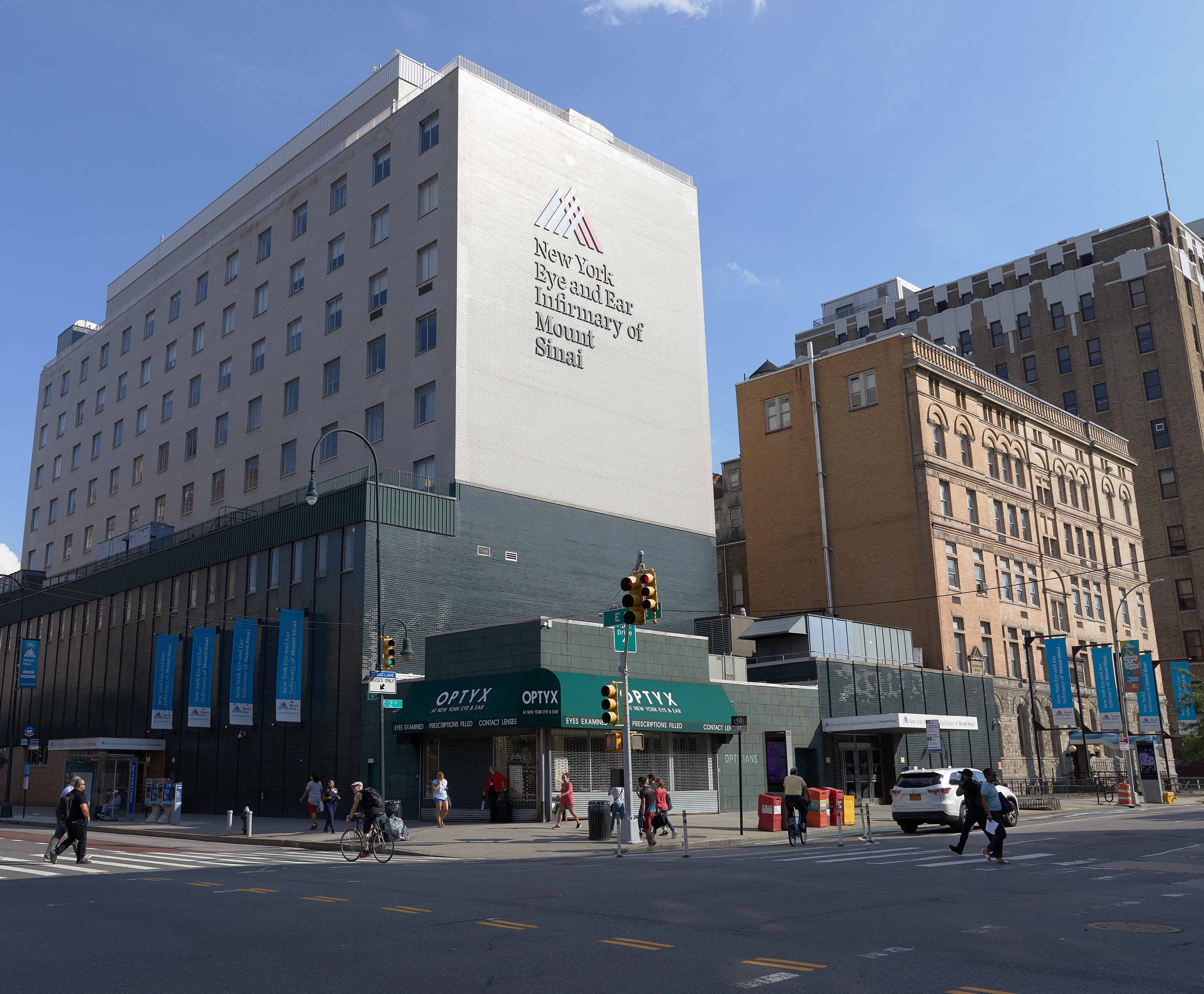
- New York Eye and Ear Infirmary North Building, opened in 1968

Geography
- Location: 310 East 14th Street, New York City, New York, United States

Organization
- Type: Teaching
- Affiliated university: Icahn School of Medicine at Mount Sinai
- Network: Mount Sinai Health System

History
- Founded: August 14, 1820

Links
- Website: www.nyee.edu
- Lists: Hospitals in New York State
- Other links: Hospitals in Manhattan

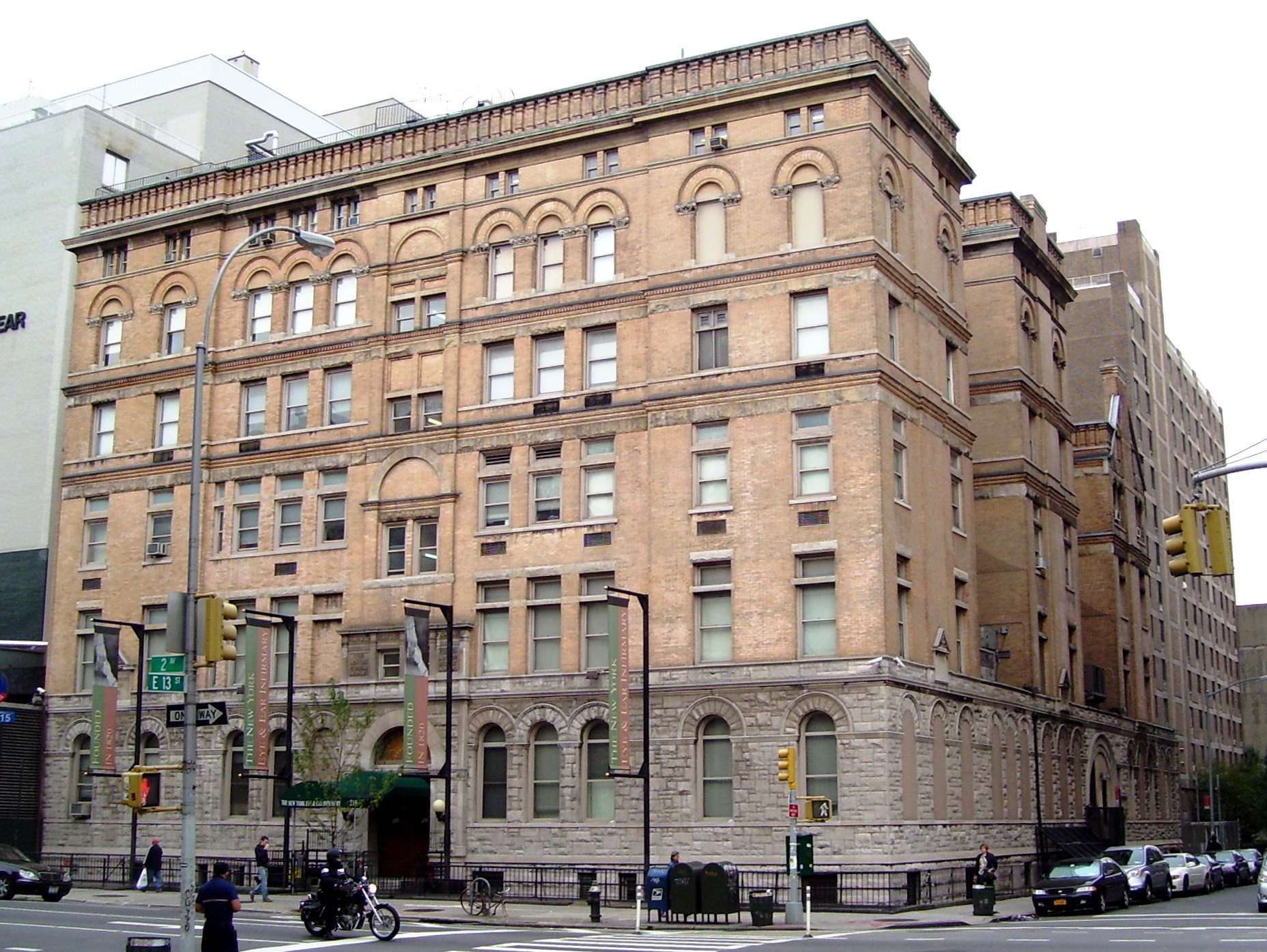
The original 13th Street building was erected in 1856, rebuilt in 1893, and now includes the Schermerhorn Pavilion, designed by Robert Williams Gibson, and opened in 1903.

New York Eye and Ear Infirmary of Mount Sinai (NYEE) is located at East 14th Street and Second Avenue in lower Manhattan, New York City. Founded on August 14, 1820, NYEE is America's first specialty hospital and one of the most prominent in the fields of ophthalmology and otolaryngology in the world, providing primary inpatient and outpatient care in those specialties. Previously affiliated with New York Medical College, as of 2013 it is affiliated with the Icahn School of Medicine at Mount Sinai as a part of the membership in the Mount Sinai Health System.

== Services ==
As of 2020, New York Eye and Ear Infirmary of Mount Sinai provides comprehensive outpatient and state-of-the-art medical/surgical care in the disciplines of ophthalmology, otolaryngology (head and neck surgery), as well as plastic and reconstructive surgery. It has 69 beds, sees a quarter-million outpatients, and performs 30,000 surgeries annually.

=== Ophthalmology ===
Medical care is provided for a wide range of eye diseases. Specialized services include cataract surgery, corneal and refractive surgery, glaucoma, neuro-ophthalmology, ocular immunology/uveitis, ophthalmic oncology, oculoplastics and orbital surgery, ophthalmologic pathology, and pediatric ophthalmology and strabismus. Throughout the tristate area, complex ocular injuries are referred to NYEE's Eye Trauma Service.

=== Otolaryngology ===
NYEE provides medical care for the diagnosis and treatment of ENT (ear, nose and throat) conditions affecting adults and children. Some of the areas treated include chronic sinusitis, nasal obstructions, ear infections, nasal polyps, nosebleeds, deviated septum, hearing and balance disorders, thyroid and parathyroid conditions, head and neck tumor surgery, sleep issues, salivary gland disorders, and congenital deformities of the ear.

In 2005, NYEE Otology merged with Beth Israel Medical Center Otology and Neurotology Center, Cochlear Implant Center, and Children's Hearing and Learning Center. In 2008, The Ear Institute at NYEE opened and was the first facility in New York to offer patients comprehensive, coordinated care in otologic services in a single location.

=== Plastic and reconstructive surgery ===
NYEE performs elective cosmetic surgery, reconstructive surgery following trauma or disease, and congenital malformation surgery. In 2018, its services expanded to include Gender Affirmation surgery in collaboration with Mount Sinai's Center for Transgender Medicine and Surgery.

== Research ==
Research includes adaptive optics cellular imaging, functional and metabolic imaging, glaucoma, neuro-ophthalmology ocular circulation, optical coherence tomography clinical imaging, retina diagnostics and restoration as well as uveitis and ocular inflammation. Resources include The Shelley and Steven Einhorn Clinical Research Center, the Eye and Vision Research Institute at New York Eye and Ear Infirmary of Mount Sinai, and the Ophthalmic Innovation and Technology Program.

=== Concentration ===
Faculty and researchers in the Department of Ophthalmology perform basic, translational, and clinical research for a wide range of conditions focused on ocular imaging, advanced treatments, new surgical devices, and genetics and genomics of eye disease.

=== Research centers ===
Centers for research and clinical investigations include The Shelley and Steven Einhorn Clinical Research Center of New York Eye and Ear Infirmary of Mount Sinai; Mount Sinai/NYEE Eye and Vision Research Institute at Icahn School of Medicine at Mount Sinai; David E. Marrus Adaptive Optics Imaging Laboratory; and Ophthalmic Innovation and Technology Program at New York Eye and Ear Infirmary of Mount Sinai.

=== Collaboration ===
Faculty at the Department of Otolaryngology at NYEE is engaged in translational research, clinical trials, and cross-departmental collaborations to develop new treatments and cures for conditions and diseases of the ears, nose, and throat.

== Education ==
=== Ophthalmology residency and fellowship ===
In July 2019, New York Eye and Ear Infirmary of Mount Sinai and the Icahn School of Medicine at Mount Sinai merged their ophthalmology programs to launch the largest ophthalmology residency program in the nation, with 10 residents per year.

The three-year ophthalmology residency training program is accredited by the Accreditation Council for Graduate Medical Education (ACGME) and offers matriculated residents clinical and surgical training as well as a range of research opportunities. Students accepted into the NYEE residency program participate in a one-year internal medicine program at Mount Sinai Beth Israel where they spend three months rotating in ophthalmology, and nine months in medicine, prior to starting their residency.

NYEE's Ophthalmology fellowships program offers ophthalmic subspecialties including cornea and external disease, glaucoma, retina, pediatric ophthalmology, uveitis, and ophthalmic plastic and reconstructive surgery.

=== Otolaryngology residency ===
Following a merger between independent programs at the Icahn School of Medicine at Mount Sinai and New York Eye and Ear Infirmary of Mount Sinai, the Otolaryngology Residency Program is the largest program in the country with six residents per training year. Subspecialties include otology-neurotology, rhinology, facial plastics, head and neck surgery, laryngology, pediatrics, and sleep.

=== Microsurgical education center ===
The Jorge N. Buxton, MD Microsurgical Education Center at New York Eye Infirmary of Mount Sinai is the center of ophthalmic and eye nose and throat education at NYEE. The microsurgical center provides ophthalmologists, otolaryngologists and plastic surgeons with opportunities for hands-on experience in a variety of surgical procedures before they surgically treat patients.

The Continuing Medical Education program supports the continuous professional development of physicians. Accredited by Accreditation Council for Continuing Medical Education, the program includes live and enduring continuing medical education courses open to physicians and trainees nationally.

== History ==
The hospital was founded by Edward Delafield and John Kearny Rodgers. In 1816, upon graduating from the New York College of Physicians and Surgeons and completing their training at New York Hospital, the two native New Yorkers traveled to Europe to continue their medical studies. It was during their studies at the London Eye Infirmary, later famed as the Royal London Ophthalmic Hospital (Moorfields) that Rodgers and Delafield realized how little attention ophthalmology received in the Americas and set about to change that. Upon their return to New York in 1818, they made the first survey of eye diseases in city. Finding a glaring lack of eye care provided to the poor, except in dire circumstances, and little interest in the medical community or city authorities in offering competent eye care, Delafield and Rodgers opened the New York Eye Infirmary. Founded on August 14, 1820, the first Infirmary was located at 45 Chatham Street (which is now 83 Park Row), across from City Hall and near the Five Points neighborhood.

On April 21, 1821, the first bylaws and rules and regulations were drawn up, and a Board of Directors, called "The Society of the New York Eye Infirmary," was formed. Early supporters of the Infirmary included prominent New Yorkers such as Colonel William Few – who became the first President of the Infirmary Board from 1821 to 1828, Philip Hone, Benjamin Strong and David Hosack – the founder of Bellevue Hospital, who contributed funds and helped raise money for the fledgling clinic. The hospital was incorporated by the New York State Legislature on March 22, 1822.

=== Name changes ===
At the time of its incorporation, on March 22, 1822, the hospital was named The New York Eye Infirmary. Although NYEE treated ear conditions since its inception, the otology department received official recognition in 1864 by an act of the state legislature and the name was legally changed to The New York Eye and Ear Infirmary.

Following the 2013 merger between Continuum Health Partners, Inc., and The Mount Sinai Medical Center, the hospital name was officially changed to New York Eye and Ear Infirmary of Mount Sinai.

In 2022, the facility was reported to be closing and up for sale, with the specialty emergency department already closed.

=== Main campus and prior locations ===
Delafield and Rodgers opened the New York Eye Infirmary on August 14, 1820 at 45 Chatham Street (which is now 83 Park Row), across from City Hall and near the Five Points neighborhood. To accommodate a growing volume of patients, NYEE's main campus expanded several times between 1878 and 1903 to include new pavilions: Abram Du Bois Pavilion (1894), James N. Platt Pavilion (1901), and the William C. Schermerhorn Pavilion (1903), designed by Robert Williams Gibson. NYEE expanded its footprint in 1968, with the opening of the North Building on East 14th Street and Second Avenue. In 1974, a new building to house Residents expanded the campus at 321 East 13th Street.

=== Mergers and affiliations ===
- 2013 - NYEE, as a member of Continuum Health Partners, Inc., merges with The Mount Sinai Medical Center, creating the Mount Sinai Health System.
- 1999- NYEE becomes a member of Continuum Health Partners, Inc., which included Beth Israel Medical Center, St. Luke's Hospital, Roosevelt Hospital, and Long Island College Hospital.
- 1980 - NYEE enters into an affiliation with New York Medical College.
- 1949 - NYEE enters into a teaching affiliation with NYU/Bellevue Hospital.
- 1946 - NYEE enters into an affiliation with New York University.
- 1938 - NYEE enters an academic affiliation with Columbia University College of Physicians and Surgeons.
- 1919 - NYEE becomes part of the New York United Hospital Fund charitable trust.

=== Notable faculty and alumni ===
- Colonel William Few, first president of New York Eye Infirmary and a signer of the U.S. Constitution
- Dr. David Kearny McDonogh, NYEE alumnus and first African-American ophthalmologist
- Dr. Cornelius Agnew, an NYEE alumnus, was a founding member, New York Ophthalmological Society (1864); Clinic for the Diseases of the Eye and Ear at the New York College of Physicians and Surgeons (1866); Brooklyn Eye and Ear Hospital (1868); Manhattan Eye, Ear and Throat Hospital (1869)
- Dr. Henry D. Noyes, an NYEE alumnus, a founding member of The American Ophthalmological Society (AOS) and New York Ophthalmological Society (1864); American Otological Society (1868)
- Dr. Edward Dench, Surgeon Director, founder member of the New York Otologic Society (1892)
- Dr. F. Phinzy Calhoun, class of 1908, established and led the department of ophthalmology at Grady Hospital and Emory University
- Dr. Emil Gruening, organized the Ear, Nose, and Throat Clinic at The Mount Sinai Hospital (1890)
- Dr. Harvey J. Howard, class of 1910, established the Department of Ophthalmology at Washington University
- Dr. John Martin Wheeler, NYEE resident class of 1910, first director of Edward S. Harkness Eye Institute at Columbia University
- Dr. Conrad Berens, a founding member of the first Pan American Congress of Ophthalmology (1940)
- Dr. Morton L Rosenthal establishes New York City's first Retina Service at NYEE (1957)
- Dr. Bruno S. Priestley, an NYEE physician, establishes the Department of Pleoptics – the first of its kind in the U.S. and the largest of its kind in the Western Hemisphere (1959)
- James C. Tsai, president as of 2014

=== Honors and awards ===
Partial list:

- Department of Ophthalmology at NYEE U.S. News & World Report “Best Hospitals” most recent rankings: #12 / 2019–2020; #11 / 2018–2019; #12 / 2017–2018; #10 / 2016–2017; #11 / 2015-2016
- Department of Otolaryngology at NYEE U.S. News & World Report “Best Hospitals” most recent rankings: #44 / 2018–2019; #50 / 2017–2018; #43 / 2015-2016
- Doximity's Ophthalmology Residency Survey results of NYEE's Ophthalmology Residency Program: #19 / 2017; #19 / 2018; #20 / 2019
- Doximity's Otolaryngology Residency Survey results of NYEE's Otolaryngology Residency Program: #31 / 2017; #19 / 2018
- Doximity's Otolaryngology Residency Survey results of Icahn School of Medicine at Mount Sinai Otolaryngology Residency Program: #6 / 2019
- Joint Commission on Accreditation of Healthcare Organizations (2012, 2015, and 2018)
- Accreditation Council for Continuing Medical Education (ACCME) (2019)
- American Nurses Credentialing Center’s (ANCC) Magnet® Recognition Program® (2009, 2014, 2019)
- Stage 6 Designation on the HIMSS Electronic Medical Records Adoption Model SM (2017

It received three Magnet awards (Magnet Recognition Program®) from he American Nurses Credentialing Center, an organization that recognizes excellent nursing performance. In 2009, it received the first Magnet award ever given to a specialized hospital.

== Community outreach ==
In 2009, the New York Eye and Ear Infirmary worked in partnership with departments at Continuum Health Partners, Inc., on "Project Chernobyl", to diagnose and treat thyroid cancer associated with radiation exposure from the Chernobyl disaster, which can take decades to develop. Thyroid cancer is a risk among some 200,000 immigrants from the former Soviet Union who now live the New York area.

The infirmary is a member of the Partners in Preparedness Program with the New York City office of Emergency Management. It welcomes volunteers for opportunities ranging from administration to patient services.

== In popular culture ==
In 1903, Helen Keller delivered a speech at the dedication of the infirmary's Schermerhorn Pavilion.

The interior of the old infirmary was used in The Godfather for the scenes in which Mafia Don Vito Corleone is in the hospital after being shot, and his son, Michael Corleone, attempts to protect him against gunmen trying to kill him.

== See also ==
- List of hospitals in New York
- List of the oldest hospitals in the United States
