= Pierre Toussaint Marcel de Serres de Mesplès =

French-born geologist (1780–1862)

Pierre Toussaint Marcel de Serres de Mesplès (3 November 1780 – 22 July 1862 in Montpellier), also known as Marcel de Serres, was a French caver, geologist and naturalist.

== Biography ==
Professor of mineralogy and geology in the faculty of science at Montpellier University from 1809. He occupied this university chair for 53 years. His professional interests included the human and animal fossils of the caves of the south of France. At his end, he contributed to the French state a large number of fossils of the region Languedoc.

He was contemporary with Cuvier (either Frédéric or Georges ).
