= Cornelius Rea Agnew =

American physician

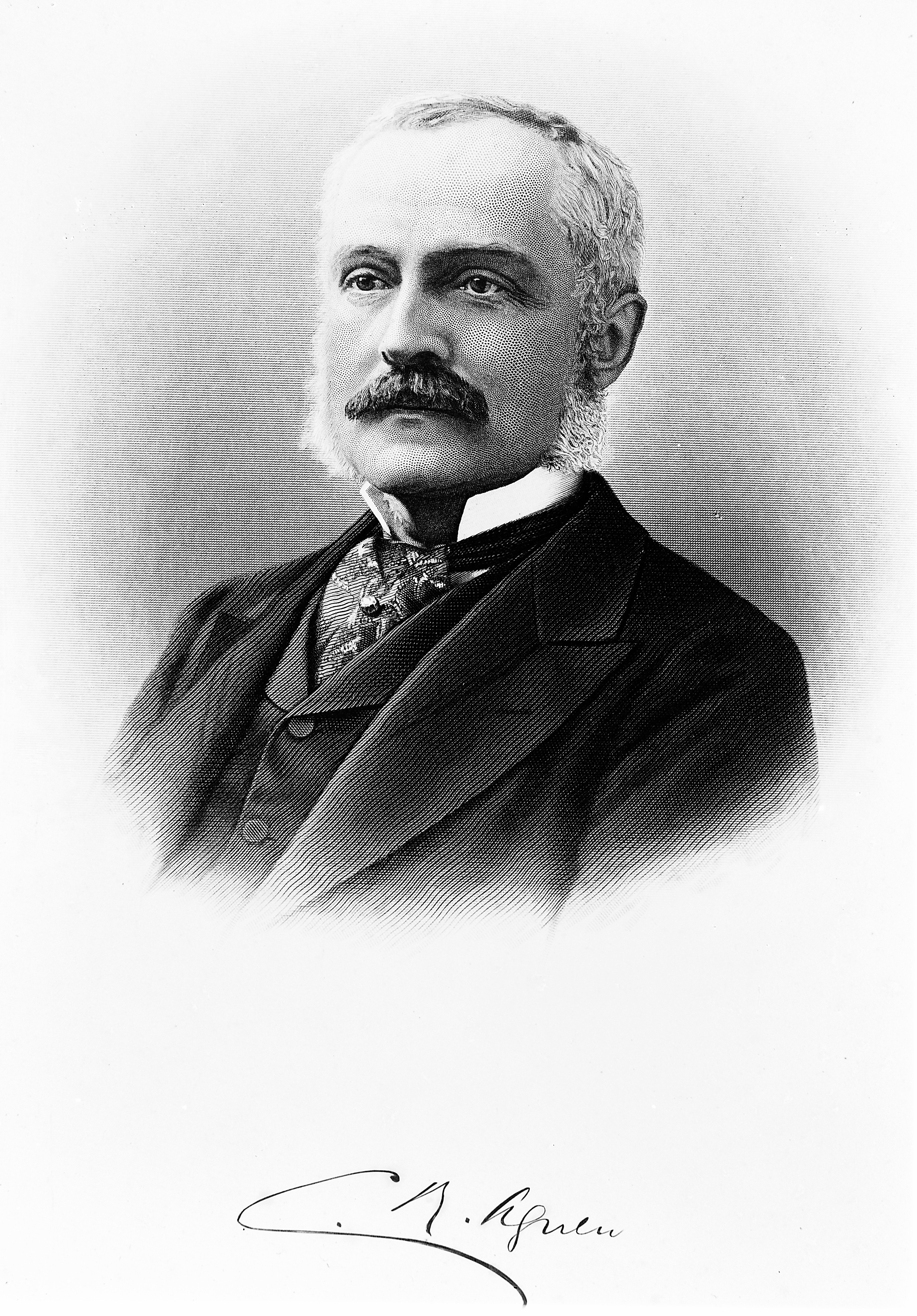
- Born: August 8, 1830; New York City
- Died: April 18, 1888; New York City
- Education: Columbia College, Columbia University College of Physicians and Surgeons
- Occupation: Surgeon
- Employers: Columbia University; New York (1858–); New York Eye and Ear Infirmary; Weill Cornell Medical Center

Cornelius Rea Agnew (August 8, 1830 – April 18, 1888) was an American surgeon.

== Early years ==
Agnew was born in New York City, the son of William Agnew and Elizabeth Thompson Agnew; his ancestors, Huguenot, Irish and Scotch, came to America from time to time during the 18th century. He entered the Columbia College in 1845, was a member of the Philolexian Society, and graduated from there in 1849 with the degree of A.B. He then received the degree of M.D. from the New York College of Physicians and Surgeons in 1852. In 1856, he married Mary Nash, daughter of Lora Nash, a New York merchant.

== Career ==
Agnew began to practice medicine in 1854 and became house surgeon, and later curator, at the New York Hospital. He went to Europe for special study in his profession, and on his return was appointed surgeon to the New York Eye and Ear Infirmary, from 1855 through 1864.

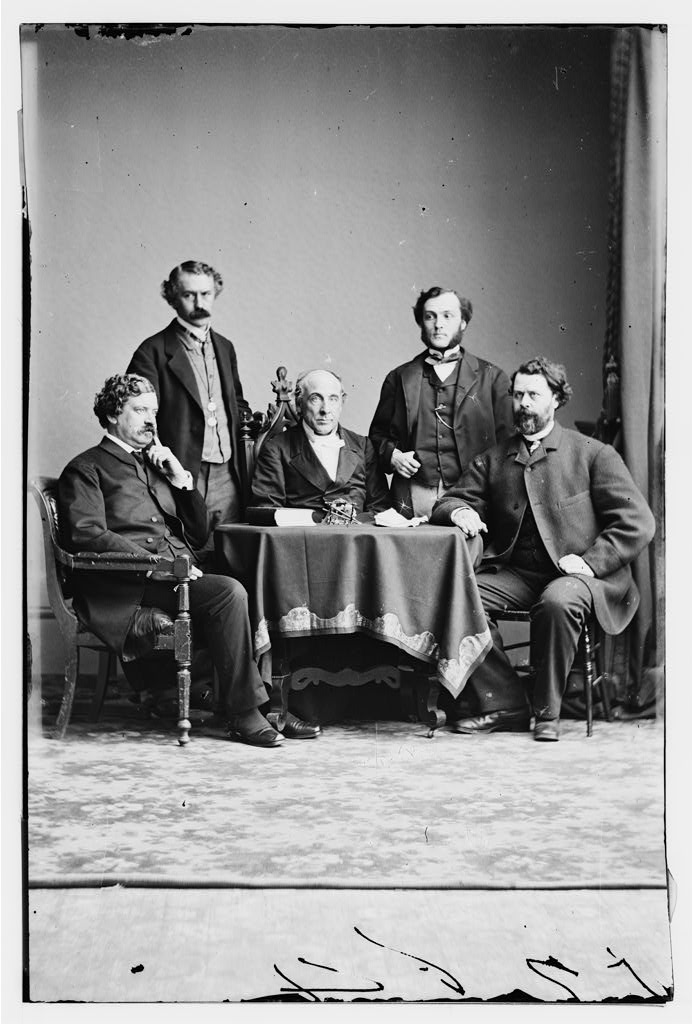
U.S. Sanitary Commission

He was appointed surgeon-general of the State of New York in 1858; during the American Civil War, he was medical director of the New York Volunteer Hospital, treating wounded soldiers from the Union Army. He was prominent in the United States Sanitary Commission, which administered supplies and medical assistance to the field armies.

After the war, he assisted in establishing the Columbia School of Mines in 1864. In the same year, he was also one of the founders of the New York Ophthalmological Society. He was instrumental, in 1868, in the founding of an ophthalmic clinic in the College of Physicians and Surgeons, of which he was in 1869 appointed professor and lecturer. He then founded the Brooklyn Eye and Ear Hospital in 1868 and the Manhattan Eye and Ear Hospital in 1869.

== Last years ==
He served as a public school trustee and was president of the board, he was also one of the managers of the New York State Hospital for the Insane at Poughkeepsie, New York. The New York County Medical Society elected him president in 1872.

In 1869 he was elected to the clinical professorship of diseases of the eye and ear in the College of Physicians and Surgeons, a position which he held till his death on April 18, 1888, in New York City.

== Legacy ==
A part of the success of the United States Sanitary Commission must be attributed to Dr. Agnew's labors. He prepared many papers relating to the eye and ear, and published in the current medical journals, also, a Series of American Clinical Lectures (1875), edited by E. C. Sequin (M.D.), besides numerous brief monographs.

Agnew's papers were donated to the National Library of Medicine in the late 1980s.
