= Daniel Bennett St. John Roosa =

American physician (1838-1908

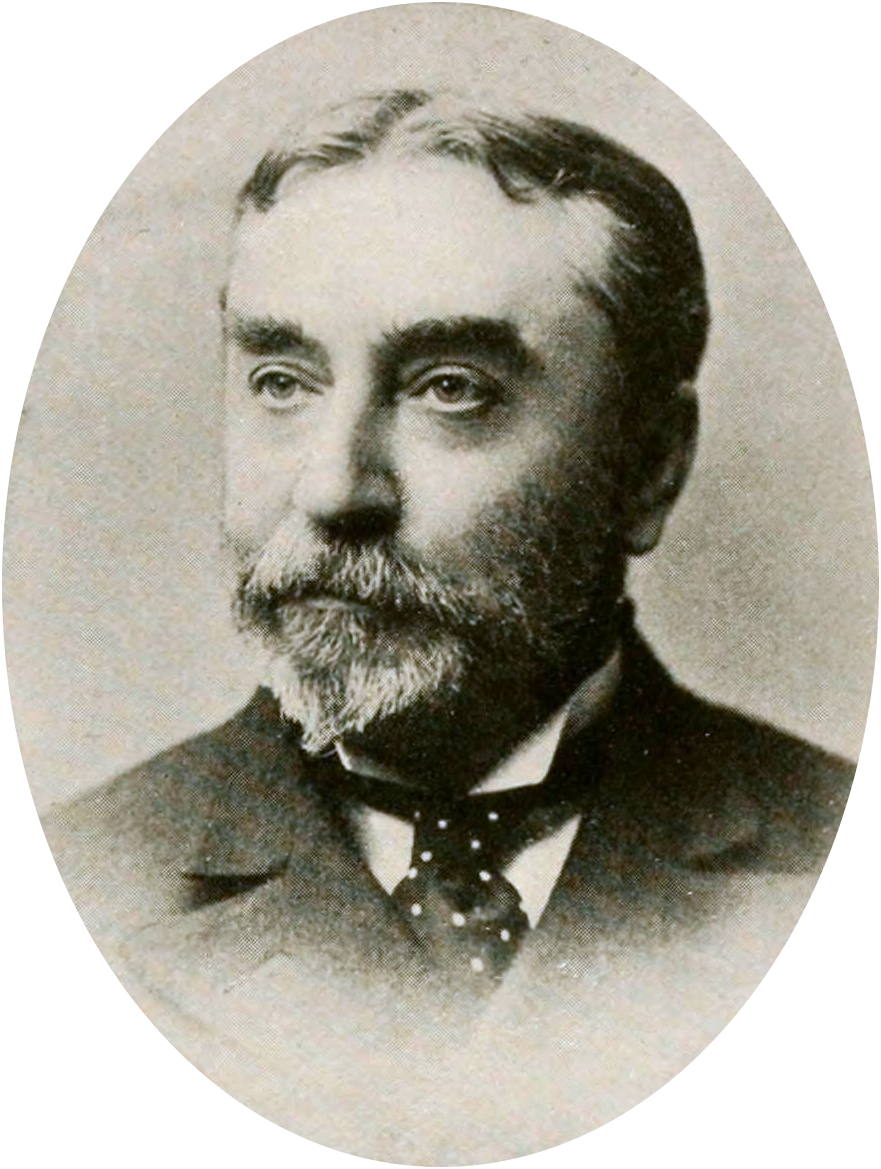
- Born: 1838; Bethel, New York, United States
- Died: 1908 (aged 69–70)
- Education: Medical College of New York University (Graduated 1860)
- Occupation: Physician
- Years active: 1860s–1908
- Medical career
- Profession: Surgeon
- Institutions: NewYork-Presbyterian Hospital; Manhattan Eye, Ear and Throat Hospital

Daniel Bennett St. John Roosa (1838–1908) was an American physician born in Bethel, New York.

He graduated in 1860 from New York's University Medical College. He was assistant surgeon in the Fifth New York Volunteers' three-months troops, became resident surgeon at the New York Hospital in 1862, and in 1864 began practice in New York City.

He was one of the founders of Manhattan Eye, Ear and Throat Hospital. From 1863 to 1882, he was a professor of diseases of the eye and ear at his alma mater, and from 1875 to 1880 held a similar chair at the University of Vermont (Burlington). In 1888, he was appointed professor of diseases of the eye in the New York Post-Graduate Medical School, of whose faculty he would become president.

== Publications ==
He wrote:

- A practical Treatise on the Diseases of the Ear (1873; sixth edition, 1885)
- The Determination of the Necessity for Wearing Glasses (1887)
- Handbook of the Anatomy and Diseases of the Eye and Ear (1904), with A. E. Davis
- Textbook of the Diseases of the Ear, Nose, and Pharynx (1905), with B. Douglass

== Gallery ==
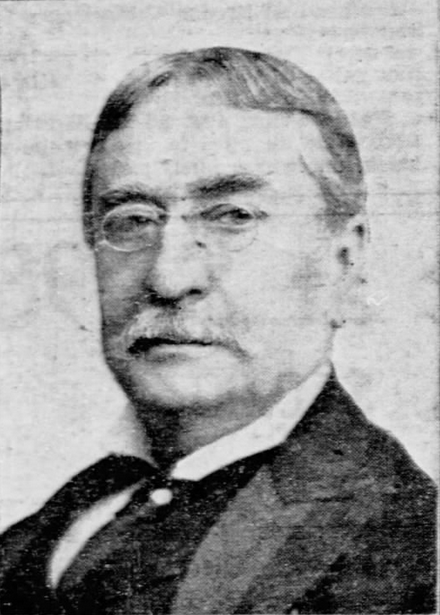
Daniel Bennett St. John Roosa, 1902
