= Anson Dickinson =

American painter (1779–1852)

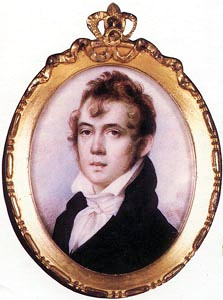
- Anson Dickinson by Edward Malbone, July 1804
- Born: 19 April 1779; Milton, Connecticut, United States
- Died: 9 March 1852 (aged 72); Milton, Connecticut, United States
- Occupation: Portrait painter
- Known for: Miniatures

Anson Dickinson (19 April 1779 – 9 March 1852) was an American painter of miniature portraits who achieved fame during his lifetime, producing a very large number of works, but who is now largely forgotten.

== Early years ==
Anson Dickinson was born in Milton, a district of Litchfield, Connecticut, in 1779, son of Oliver Dickinson Junior (1757-1847) and Anna Landon Dickinson (1760-1849). He was the oldest of ten children. His father was a master carpenter. For a while Dickinson was apprenticed to Isaac Thompson, a silversmith in Litchfield. He did enamel work, made frames and painted signs before becoming a miniature painter. He probably met and learned from Elkanah Tisdale in these early years. On 27 April 1802 Dickinson published an advertisement for miniature portrait painting in the Connecticut Journal, a New Haven newspaper. The first known painting signed by Dickinson is dated 1803.

In July 1804, Dickinson made a trip to New York City, where Edward Greene Malbone painted his portrait. He returned to Connecticut and began painting prominent local people as well as students from the Tapping Reeve Law School and the Litchfield Female Academy founded by Sarah Pierce. He began traveling in 1805, a habit that lasted most of his life. He met Washington Irving in Albany in 1810, and Irving encouraged him in his work. He showed his work in a number of exhibitions between 1811 and 1815. His work was shown at the Pennsylvania Academy of the Fine Arts, the National Academy of Design, the American Academy of the Fine Arts and the Boston Athenaeum. In 1816 he was among the first to be elected to the American Academy of the Fine Arts.

At several times during his career Dickinson had a studio in New York City. Thus on 16 February 1811 a notice appeared in the New York City Commercial Advertiser saying "Mr. Dickinson informs his friends that he has re-commenced Miniature Painting, in the City Hotel, adjoining the Assembly Room." Since this hotel was called "the grandest and most important public house in New York City", Dickinson was clearly doing well at this time. To promote business he frequently advertised in the newspapers, and would place his business card in the lockets that held his miniatures.

== Later career ==
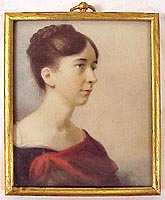
Mary Ann Walker Dickinson, the artist's adopted daughter

Dickinson married Sarah Brown in New York City in 1812, and they lived there until 1820, when he resumed traveling. Dickinson met the famous artist Gilbert Stuart in Boston 1823. Stuart was unusually impressed by Dickinson, and commissioned him to paint miniatures of himself and his daughter. Around 1824 the Dickinsons adopted two children whose mother had died, Mary Ann Walker (Note: Mary Ann later became the second wife of Senator Truman Smith of Connecticut.) and William Edmund Walker. During his settled periods, the family lived with Dickinson. While he was on the road, they lived in Milton with his family.

Dickinson stayed in Washington, D.C. from 1827 to 1830, painting portraits of many important political and military leaders. He also visited and worked in Albany, New York City, Charleston, Boston, Philadelphia, Baltimore, Washington, D.C., New Haven, Litchfield, Buffalo and parts of Canada. In 1833 he settled in New Haven for a while.

Dickinson often returned to visit his family in Milton, and painted portraits of residents of Litchfield. He finally returned to Milton for good in 1846, and devoted himself to gardening until his death on 9 March 1852. Despite his success, Dickinson had not become wealthy. The 1850 census records that the retired couple's neighbors in Litchfield included a shoemaker, cabinetmaker, carpenter, labourer, and a blacksmith. Both Dickinson and his wife died in 1852, and are buried in the Blue Swamp Cemetery of the town.

== Work ==
=== Subjects ===
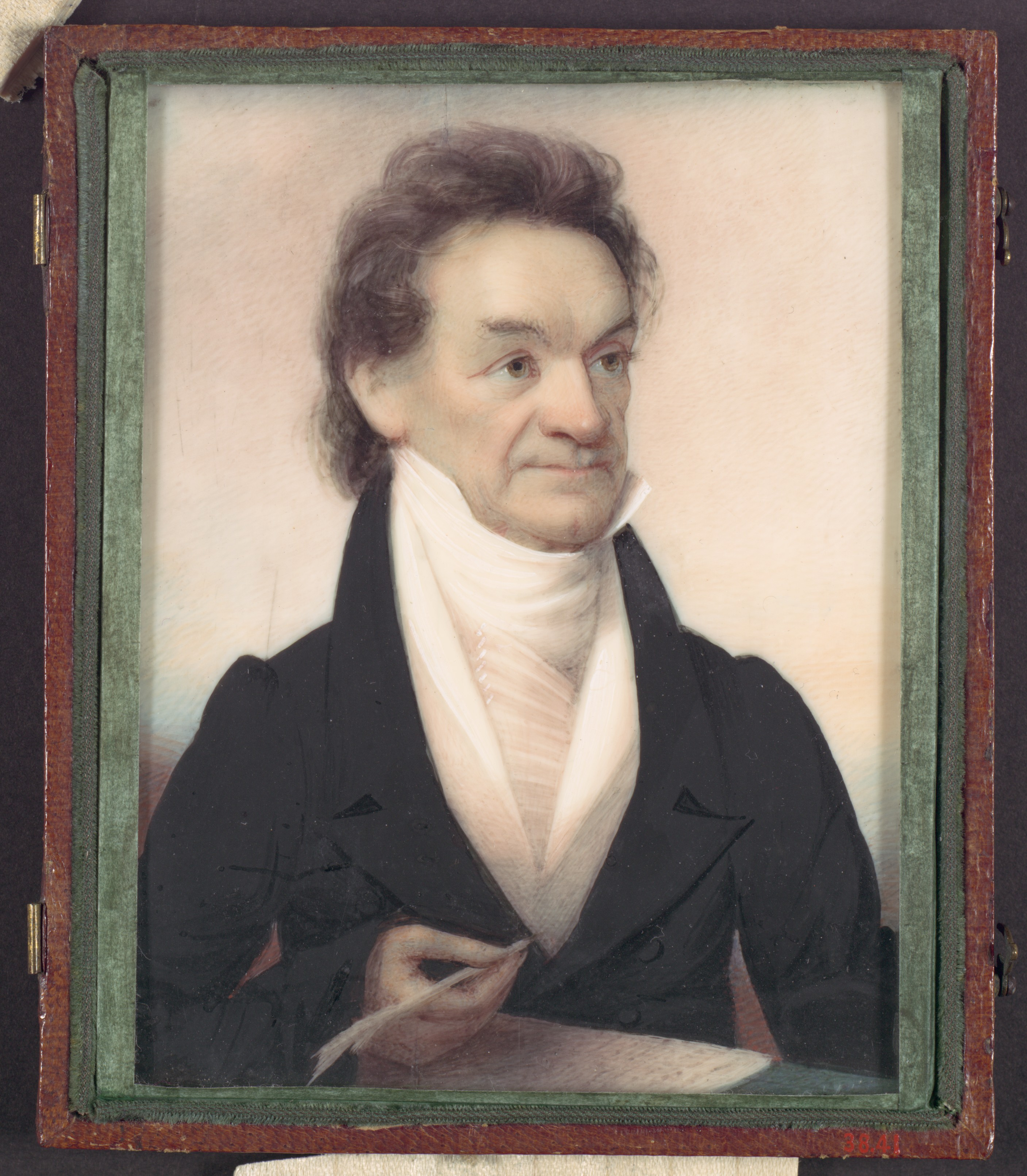
Edward Livingston c, 1827

Dickinson kept a work book that documents 1,500 subjects that he painted over the fifty years of his career, giving the place and date of each work, and sometimes the price. His subjects included both common people, such as his family members and neighbors, and prominent members of society. Some of the latter included Edward Livingston, General Jacob Brown, Washington Irving, General Peter Buell Porter, Sam Houston and Gilbert Stuart.

In July 1830 Dickinson was commissioned by George Washington Parke Custis to make a copy of Charles Willson Peale's 1772 "Militia Colonel Portrait" of George Washington. Dickinson's engraving captured the essence of the original, but was somewhat simplified due to the constraints of the miniature format. There was great demand for pictures of Washington, and Custis allowed Dickinson to hire James W. Steel to produce an engraving copied from his miniature. He advertised the reproductions for sale for one dollar each.

=== Style ===
Although Dickinson was probably self-taught, he was considered a highly talented artist during his lifetime. Dickinson's mentor Malbone was one of the leading miniaturists at that time. Much of Dickinson's early work reflects Malbone's style as exemplified by the portrait he made of Dickinson, including delicate modeling and soft color. His best works were those he painted earlier in his career. These works are mostly oval, while the portraits after 1820 are usually rectangular. His later work had broader and looser brushwork, and the pictures often had a pinkish tinge. A book published in 1834 was not complementary:

I first saw him in Albany in 1805 and his painting was then indicative of talent, He became a very good colourist. He was a very handsome, promising young man, but the promise of his youth has not been realized. In 1811 he was the best miniature painter in New York. He has led a wandering, irregular life, without credit to himself or his profession.

Dickinson is little-known now and much of his work has been lost. Important public collections of his work are held by the Litchfield Historical Society and the Stamford Historical Society. Examples of his work are also held by the Connecticut Museum of Culture and History, Yale University Art Gallery, and New Haven Colony Historical Society.

=== Gallery ===
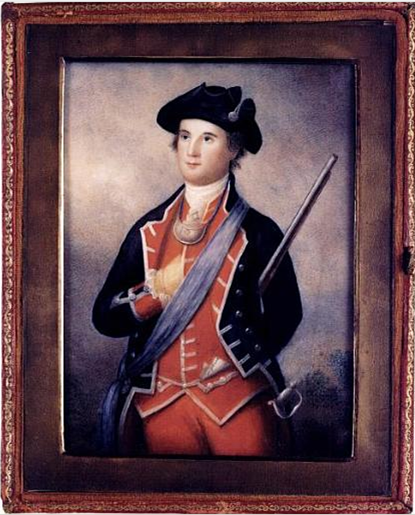
George Washington - 1848 copy of the 1772 original by Charles Willson Peale

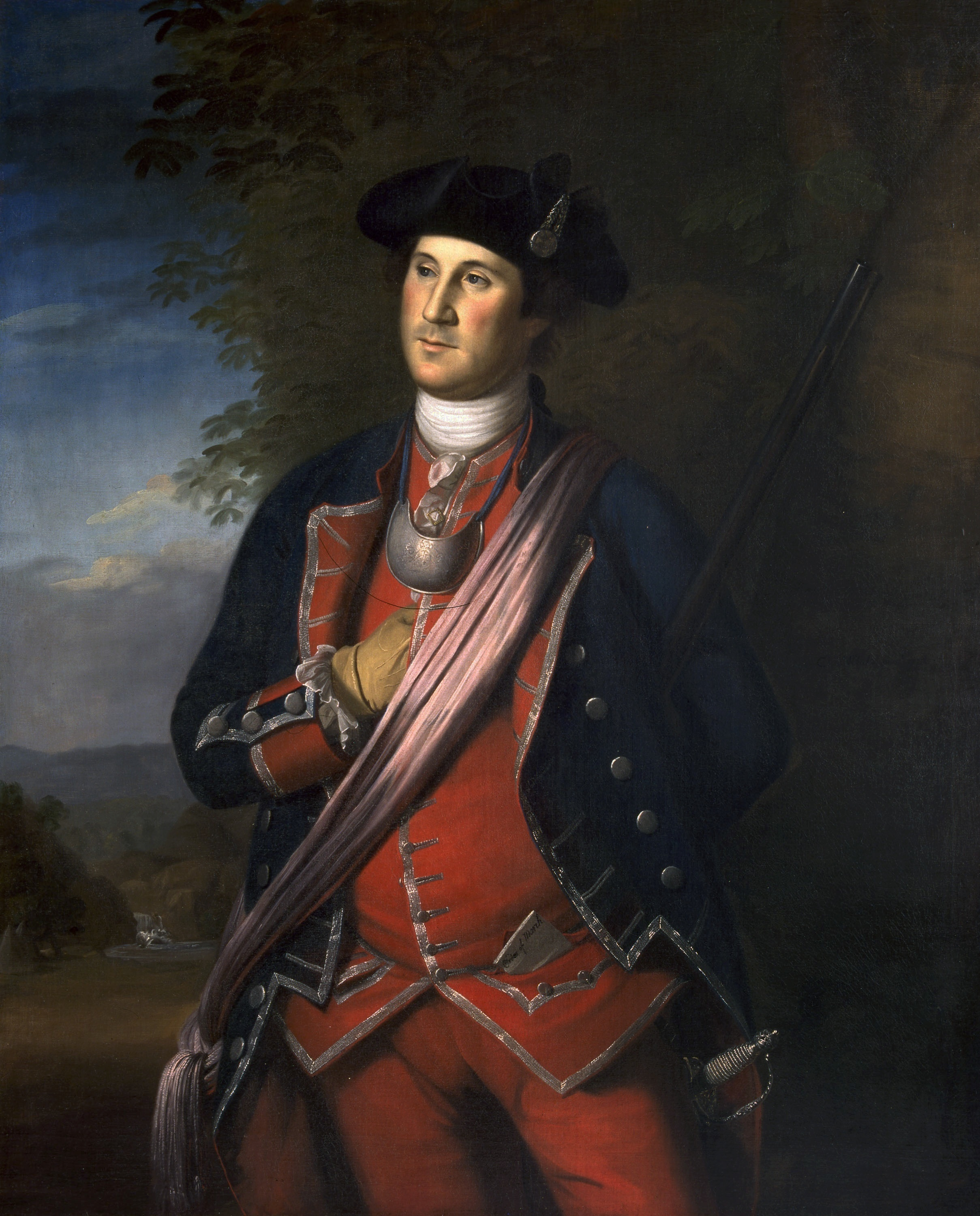
George Washington - 1772 original by Charles Willson Peale

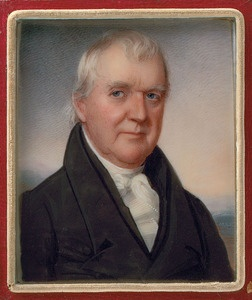
Portrait of Epaphroditus Champion in 1825

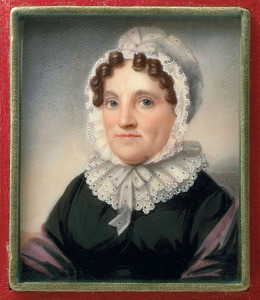
Mrs. Epaphroditus Champion (Lucretia Hubbard)

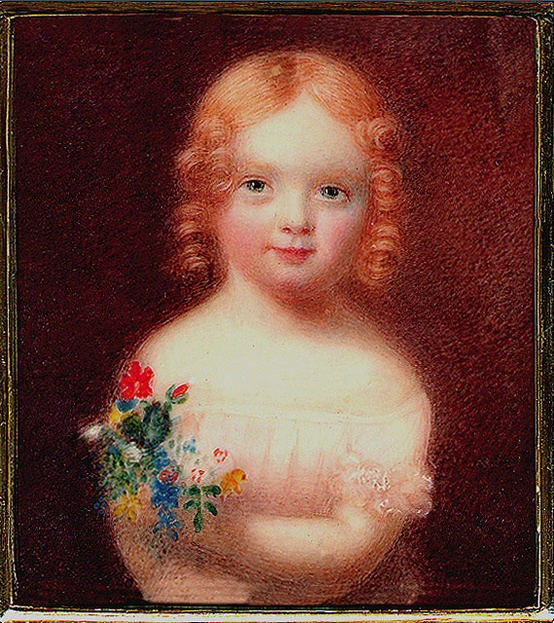
Julia Chester at the age of 2½

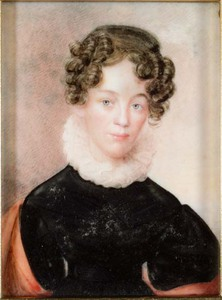
Lucy Sheldon Beach in 1831

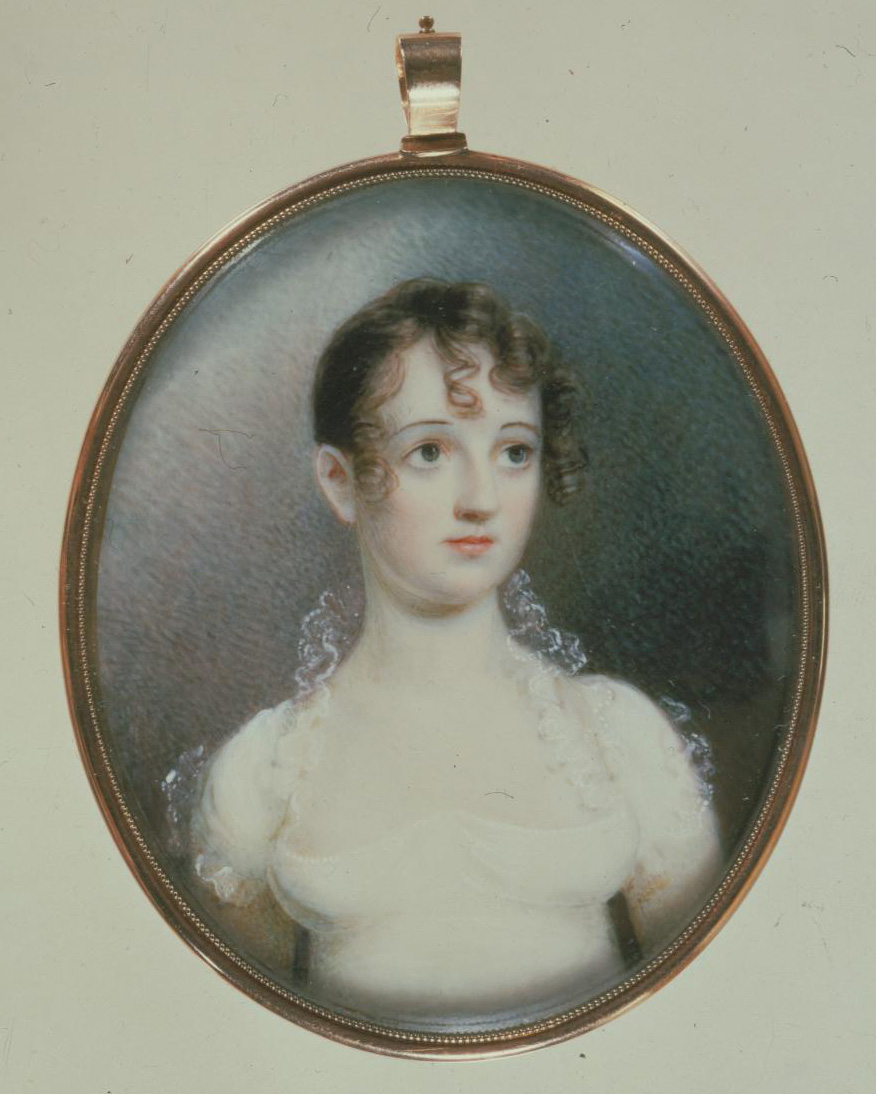
Elizabeth Canfield Tallmadge

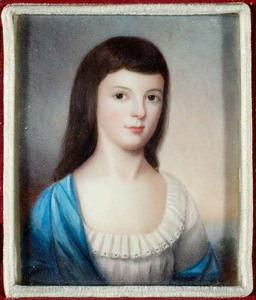
Dorothy Deming, daughter of Julius and Dorothy Champion Deming of Litchfield

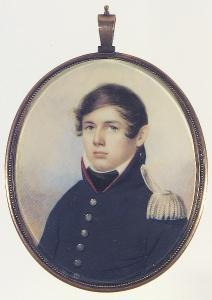
A young Ensign

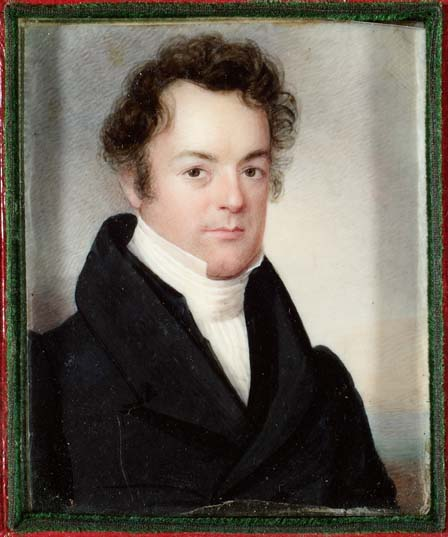
Attorney Charles Perkins, probably painted when Perkins was a student at Tapping Reeve's law school

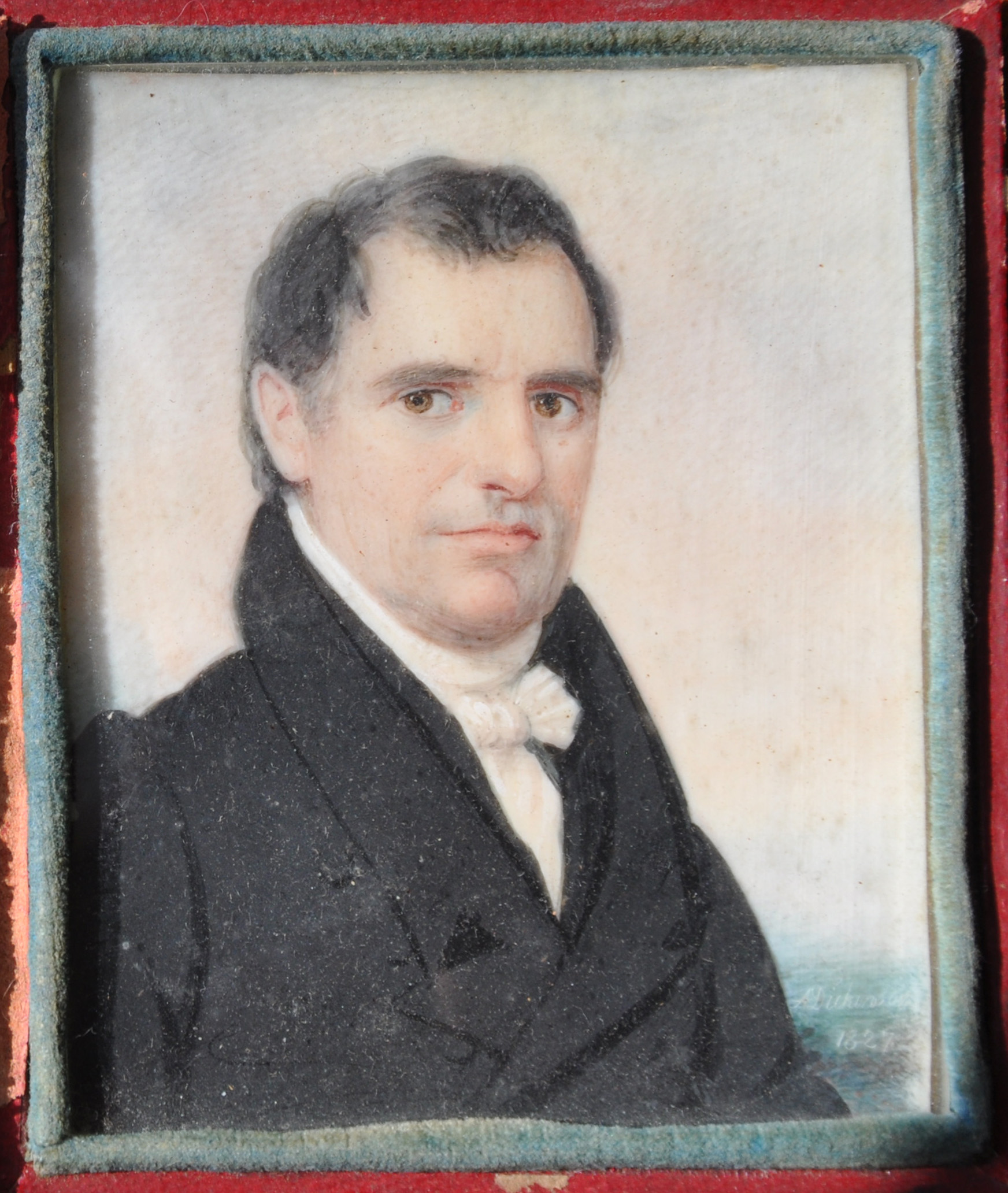
Horatio Seymour (May 31, 1778 - November 21, 1857)

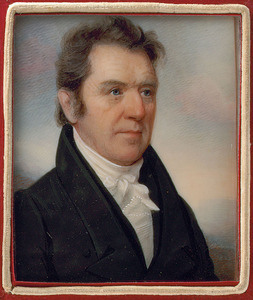
Asa Bacon

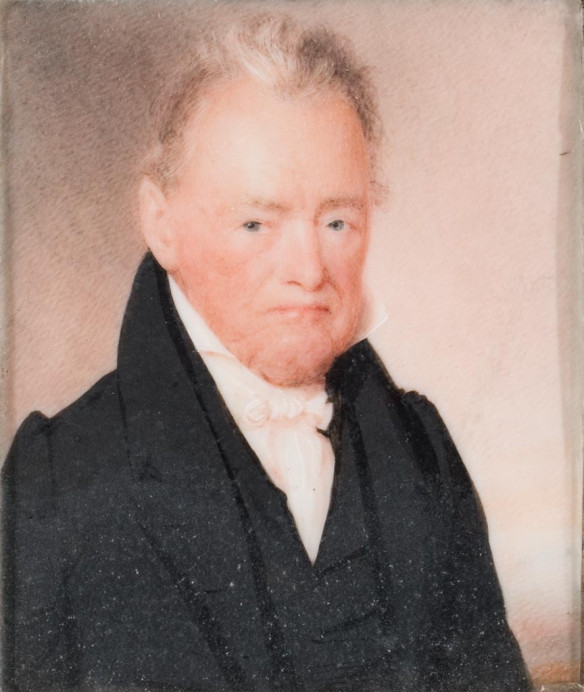
Dr. Daniel Sheldon of Litchfield in 1831

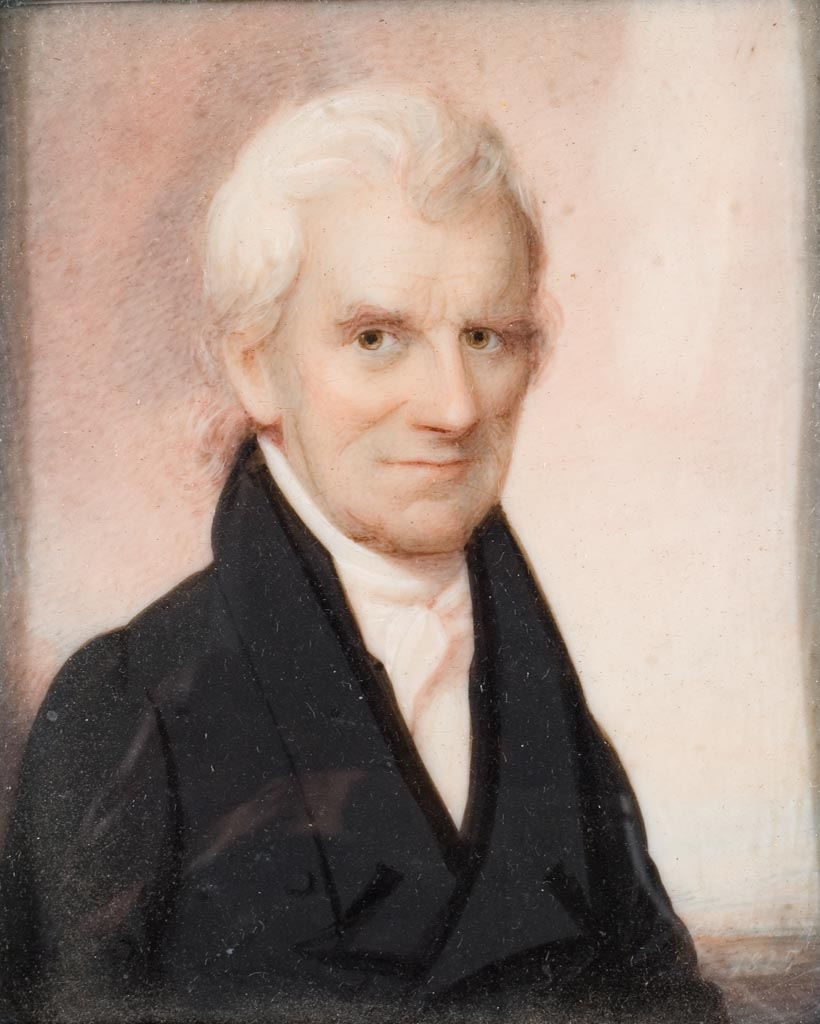
Major Moses Seymour (July 23, 1742 - September 17, 1826)

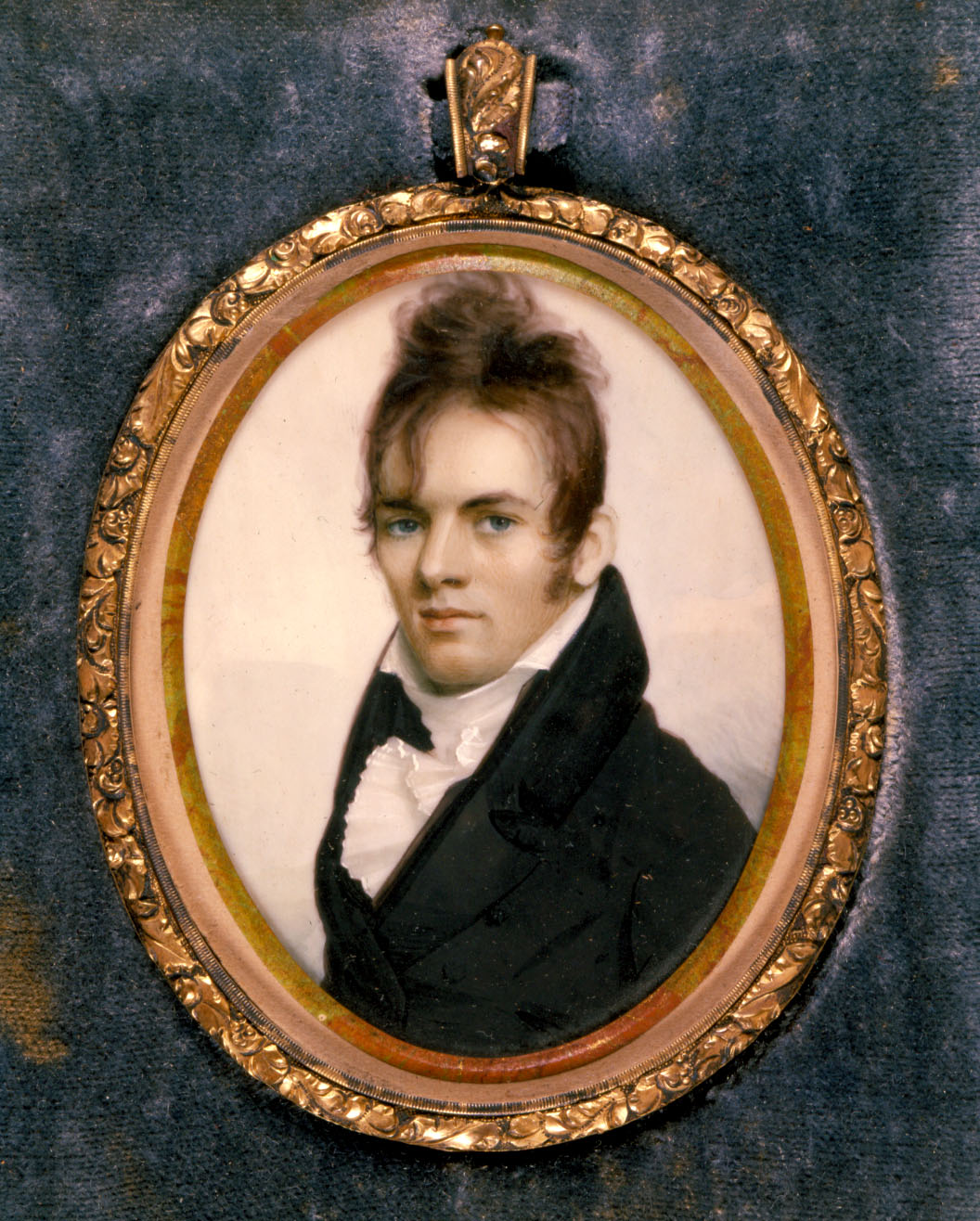
Royal Ralph Hinman, Secretary of the State of Connecticut (1835-1842)

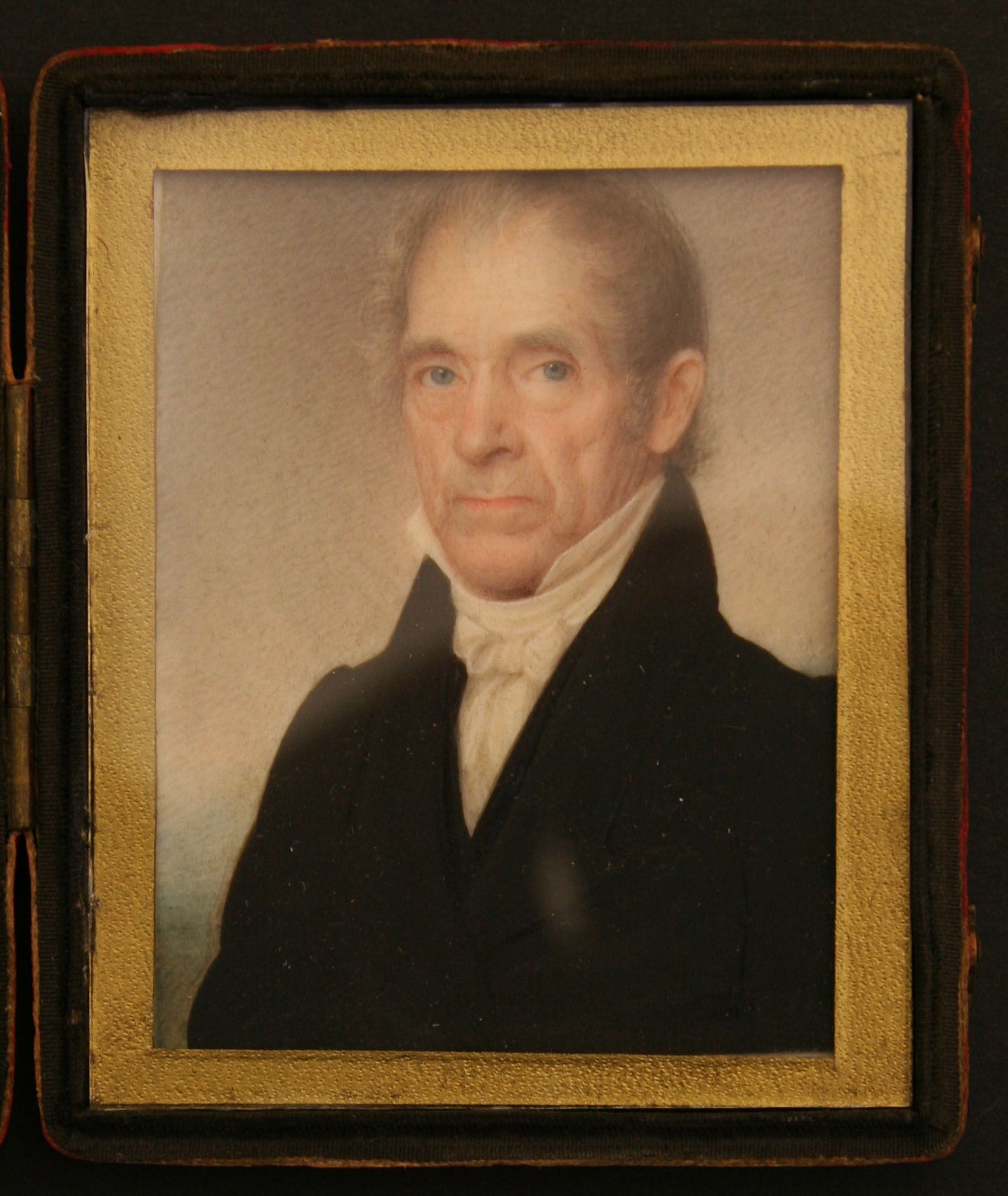
Reuben Webster

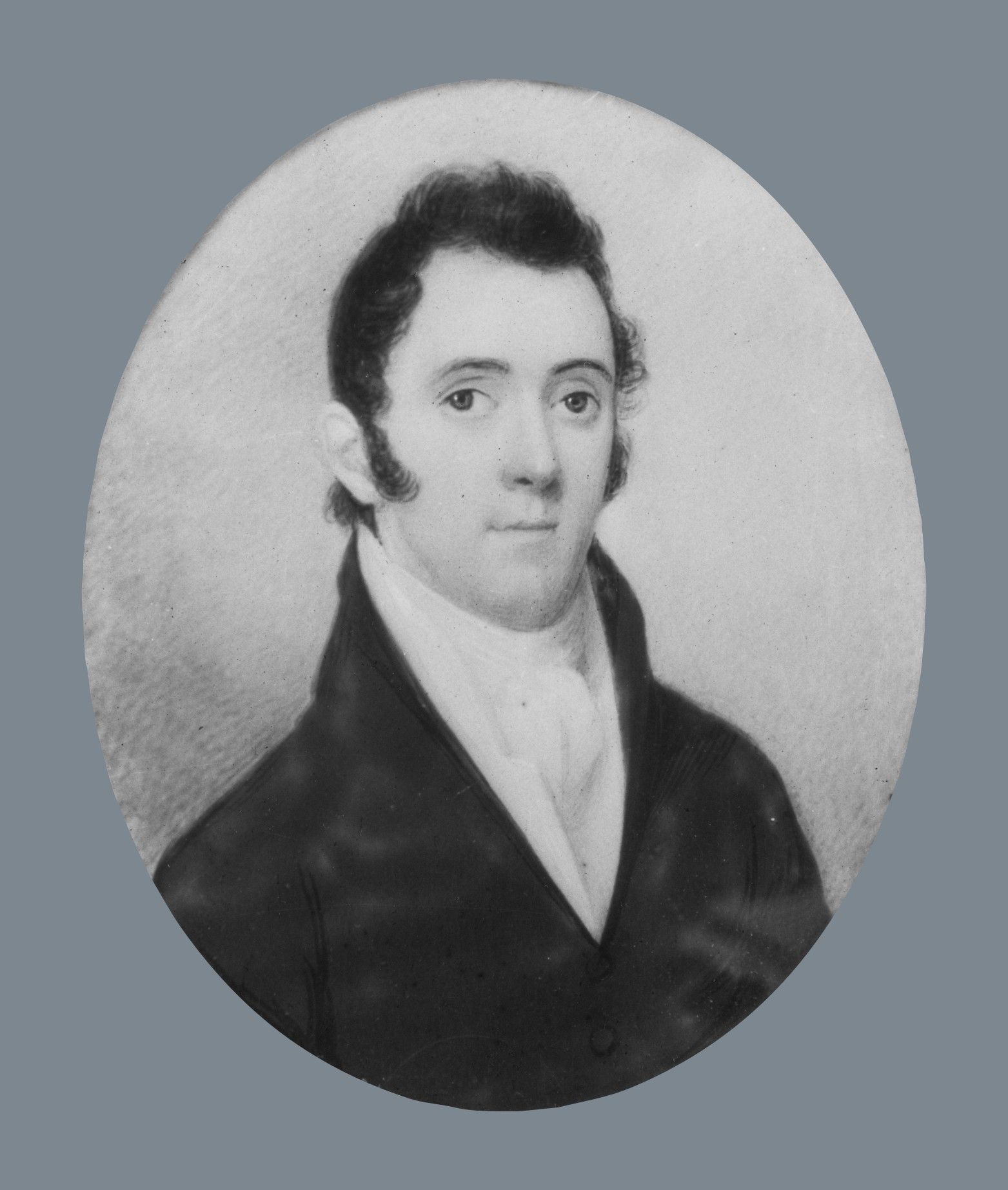
Dr. Valentine Mott c. 1820

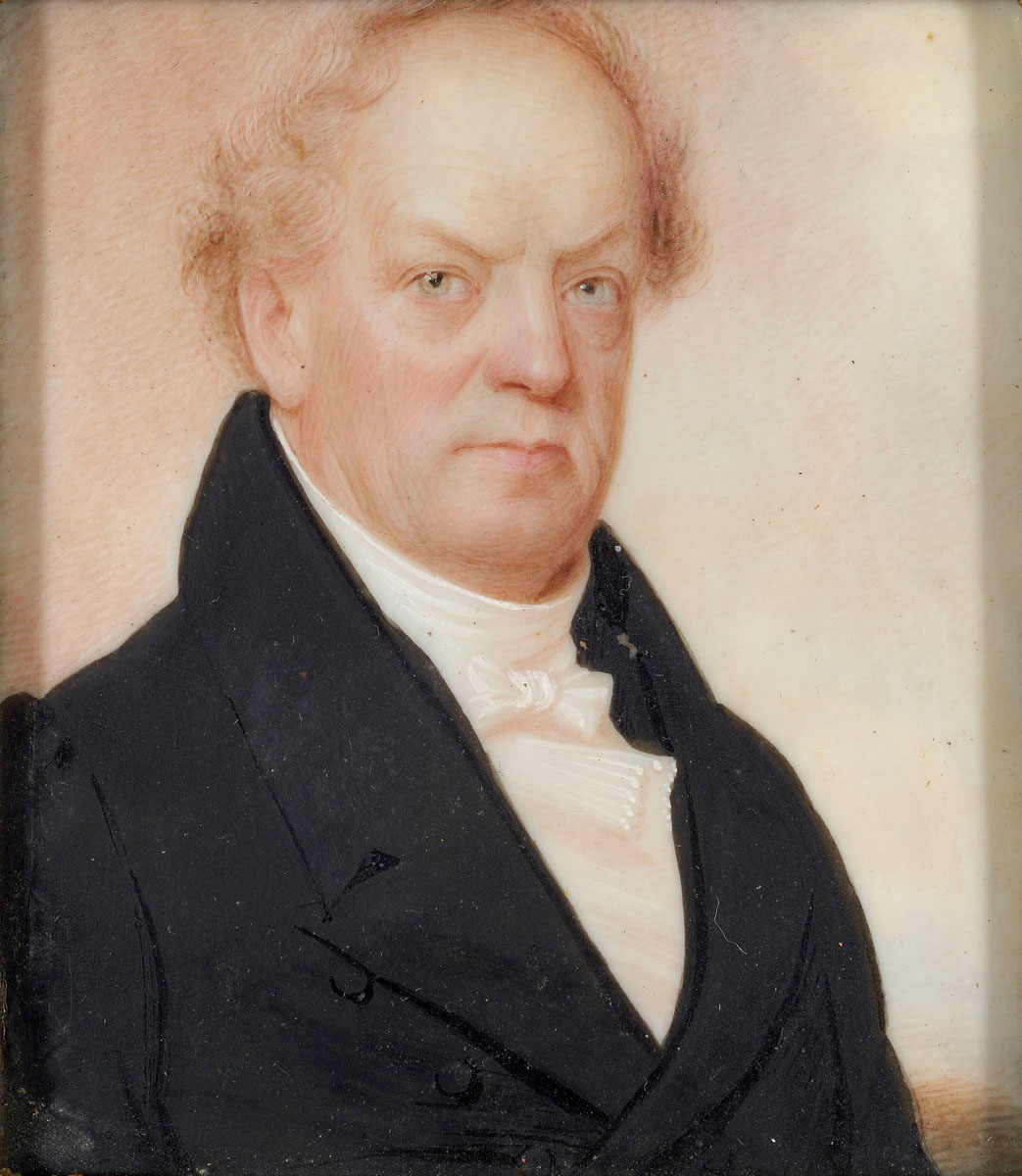
Frederick Wolcott - 1 August 1829. Wolcott was son of Oliver Wolcott, former governor of Connecticut.

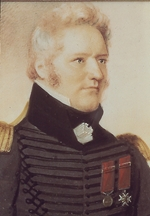
Charles-Michel d'Irumberry de Salaberry - 1825

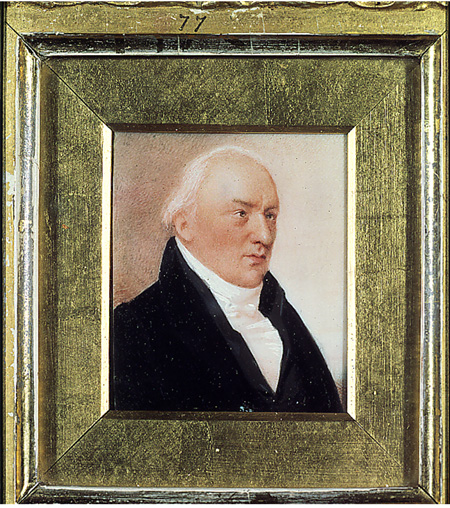
Ignace-Michel-Louis-Antoine d'Irumberry de Salaberry, seigneur of Beauport

== Sources ==
- "ANSON DICKINSON (1779-1852)". Stamford Historical Society.
- Aronson, Julie; Wieseman, Marjorie E. (2006). "Anson Dickinson". Perfect Likeness: European And American Portrait Miniatures from the Cincinnati Art Museum. Yale University Press. ISBN 978-0-300-11580-2.
- Barratt, Carrie Rebora; Zabar, Lori (2010). "Anson Dickinson". American Portrait Miniatures in The Metropolitan Museum of Art. Metropolitan Museum of Art. ISBN 978-1-58839-357-9.
- Dunlap, William (1834). History of the rise and progress of the arts of design in the United States. p. 217.
- Groft, Tammis Kane; MacKay, Mary Alice (1998). Albany Institute of History & Art: 200 Years of Collecting. SUNY Press. p. 150. ISBN 978-1-55595-101-6.
- Johnson, Dale T. (1990). "Anson Dickinson". American Portrait Miniatures in the Manney Collection. Metropolitan Museum of Art. p. 103. ISBN 978-0-87099-597-2.
- Lewis, Richard Warrington Baldwin; Lewis, Nancy (1999). American Characters: Selections from the National Portrait Gallery, Accompanied by Literary Portraits. Yale University Press. p. 382. ISBN 978-0-300-07895-4.
- Shelton, Don (2008). "Dickinson, Anson - portrait of a young man".
- Shushan, Elle (2012). "A gentleman called Colonel McIntyre by Anson Dickinson".
