= Beauty Revealed =

1828 painting by Sarah Goodridge

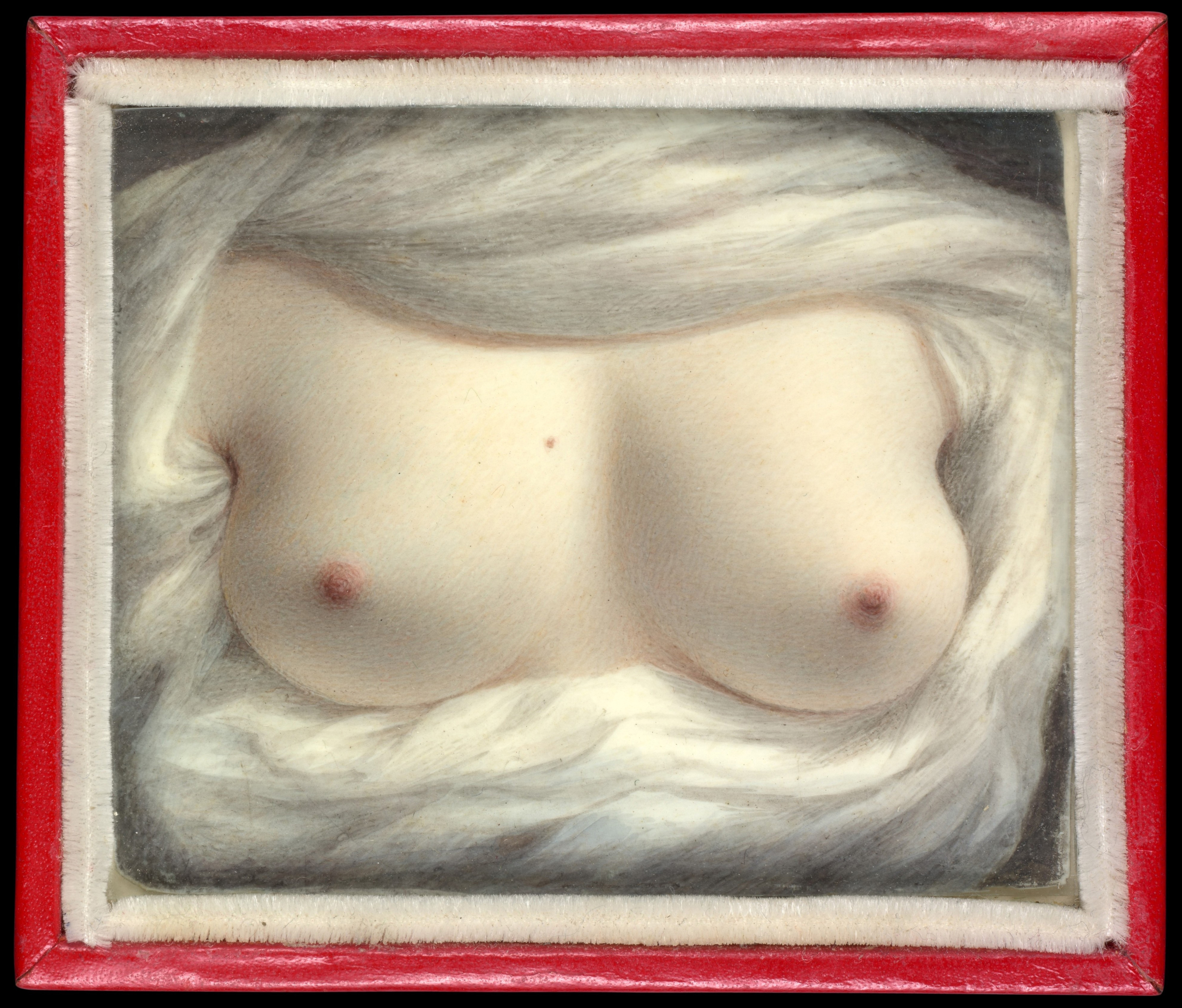
- Artist: Sarah Goodridge
- Year: 1828
- Type: Watercolor on ivory
- Dimensions: 6.7 cm × 8 cm (2.6 in × 3.1 in)
- Location: Metropolitan Museum of Art, New York City, United States
- Accession: 2006.235.74

Beauty Revealed is an 1828 watercolor painting on ivory by the American artist Sarah Goodridge. Identified as a self-portrait, it depicts a pair of bared breasts surrounded by white cloth. The 2.6-by-3.1-inch (6.7 by 8 cm) painting, originally backed with paper, is now in a modern case. Goodridge, aged forty when she completed the watercolor portrait miniature on a piece of ivory, presented the breasts as youthful and individualized. She employed a frontal view that showed only the area from the collarbone to just underneath the breasts, thereby anonymizing the portrait.

Goodridge gave the portrait to statesman Daniel Webster, who was a frequent subject and possibly a lover, following the death of his wife; it may have been intended to offer the artist to him. Although Webster married someone else, his family held onto the portrait until 1981, when it was auctioned at Christie's. Purchased by Gloria and Richard Manney, the painting was acquired by the Metropolitan Museum of Art in 2006. It has been read as a work of erotica, as well as an expression of the artist's confident sexuality.

== Description ==
Beauty Revealed depicts a woman's bared breasts and pink nipples, using a frontal view that shows the area from the bottom of the collarbone to just beneath the breasts. Individualized with a beauty mark on the proper right breast, the breasts are modeled in gradations of color and shade, giving a three-dimensional effect. It is identified as a self-portrait by the artist, Sarah Goodridge, according to descendants of its recipient, Daniel Webster. Although Goodridge was aged forty when she painted this miniature, according to the art critic Chris Packard her breasts seem younger, with a "balance, paleness, and buoyancy" which is imbued in part by the harmony of light and color. The breasts are framed by a swirl of pale cloth, which in parts reflects the light.

The painting, measuring 2.6 by 3.1 inches (6.7 by 8 cm), is today mounted in a leather case with a hinged lid and two clasps; it had originally been installed on a paper backing which had the date "1828" on the reverse. The work is a watercolor painting on ivory, thin enough for light to shine through and give the depicted breasts what the art curator Chelsea Nichols calls "a subtle yet ethereal glow". This medium was common for American miniatures, and Goodridge was skilled in shaping and preparing ivory plaques for her portraiture. In this case, the medium also served as a simile for the flesh presented upon it, providing a tactile surface that could be touched in lieu of the depicted subject. Such a physical component was common in early 19th-century miniatures, and literature from the time describes miniatures as being caressed, spoken with, or even kissed.

== History ==
=== Background ===
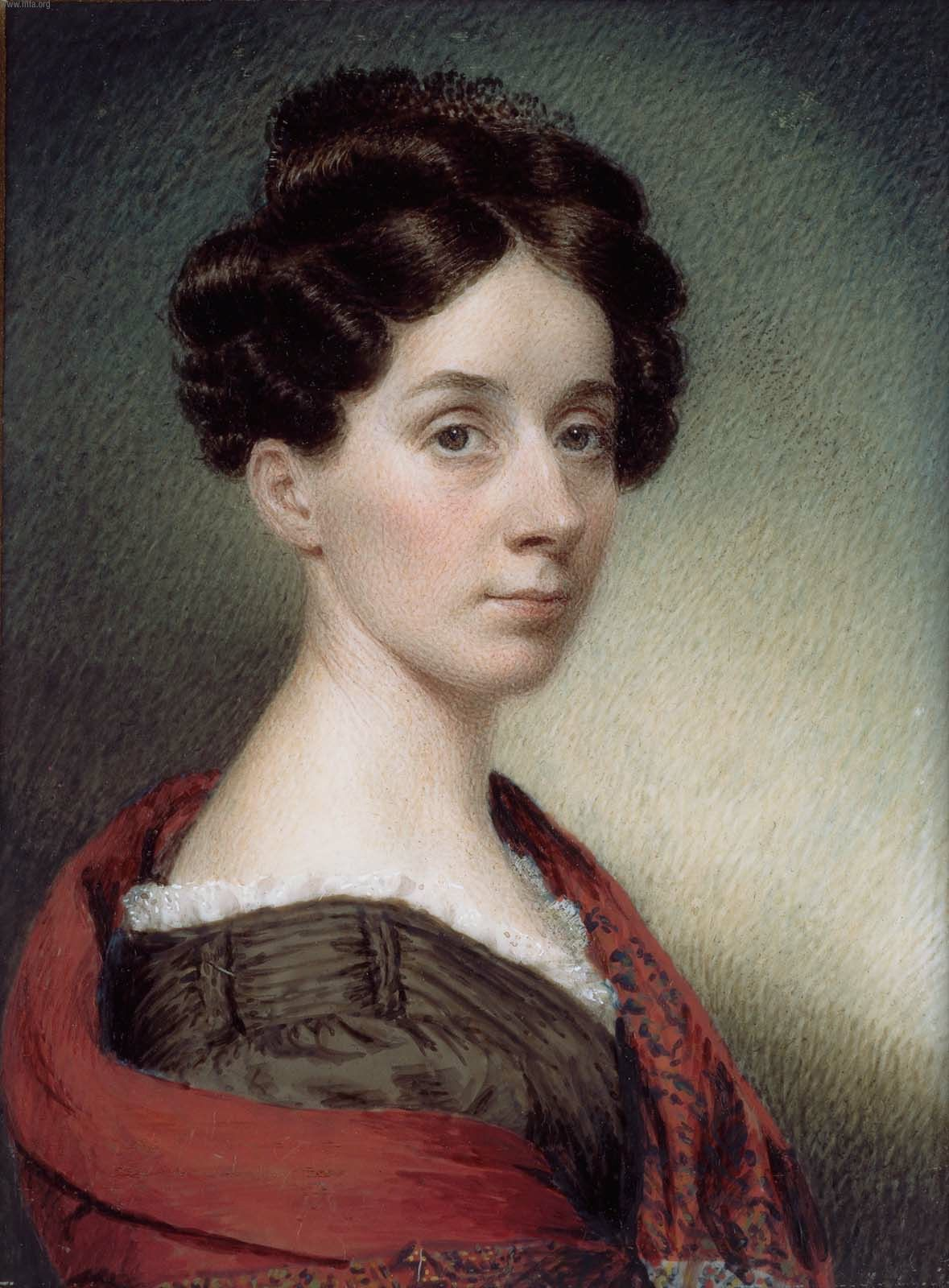
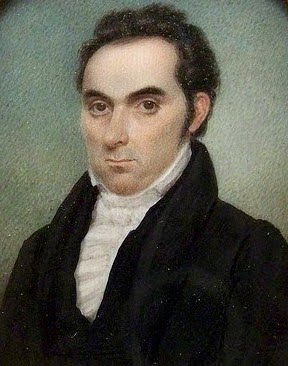
Left: Sarah Goodridge, the artist, in 1830. Right: Daniel Webster, the recipient, in 1825. Both portraits were painted by Goodridge.

Beauty Revealed was completed during a period of popularity of portrait miniatures, a medium that had been introduced in America in the mid-18th century. By the time Goodridge completed her self-portrait, miniatures were increasing in complexity and vibrancy; the genre was particularly common among women artists, who were perceived as having what the art scholar Emily Gerhold describes as the "delicate sense of touch" necessary. The Heilbrunn Timeline of Art History describes Beauty Revealed as a play on the eye miniatures which were then popular as tokens of affection in England and France, but not common in the United States. Such miniatures allowed portraits of loved ones to be carried by their suitors without revealing the sitters' identities; similarly, by omitting her face, Goodridge ensured that she would not be associated with Beauty Revealed should it be discovered.

In the early 19th century, the nude was a rare subject for painters in the United States. Works that depicted the naked female form tended to present Native Americans or, borrowing from the European tradition, stories from Greek and Roman mythologies. Even these were controversial, and works by Adolf Ulrik Wertmüller, Rembrandt Peale, and John Vanderlyn had sparked outcry when exhibited. Beauty Revealed, with its focus on bared female breasts, was thus unique. The title may be an allusion to the subject matter; cultural materials from the time often used the term beauty euphemistically to refer to breasts.

The artist, Sarah Goodridge, was a prolific Boston-based portrait miniature painter who studied under Elkanah Tisdale, it is believed, and later Gilbert Stuart. She had a long-term association with Daniel Webster, a politician who began serving as a United States senator from Massachusetts in 1827, and was rumored to have been his mistress during his first widowerhood. Webster sent her more than forty letters between 1827 and 1851, and in time, his greetings to her became increasingly familiar; his last letters were addressed to "My dear, good friend", which was uncharacteristic of his usual writing style. She, meanwhile, painted him more than a dozen times, produced several portraits of his family, and lent him money regularly. Goodridge left her hometown of Boston to visit him in Washington, D.C., at least twice, once in 1828 after his first wife's death and again in 1841–42, when Webster was separated from his second wife.

=== Provenance ===
Goodridge completed Beauty Revealed in 1828, possibly from looking at herself in a mirror, though the arrangement of the cloth suggests a lying or reclined position. Possible inspirations include John Vanderlyn's Ariadne Asleep on the Island of Naxos. Goodridge sent her portrait to Webster when he was a new widower, and, based on its miniature format, it was likely intended for his eyes alone. The American writer and art critic John Updike speculated that the artist intended it as an erotic offer of herself to Webster. Ultimately, in December 1829 Webster married another, wealthier woman, who was more advantageous to his political ambitions.

After Webster's death, Beauty Revealed continued to be handed down by his family, together with another self-portrait Goodridge had sent to him. The politician's descendants held that Goodridge and Webster had been engaged. The painting was eventually auctioned through Christie's New York on June 26, 1981, with a hammer price of $15,000 (equivalent to $53,000 in 2025), and passed through the Alexander Gallery of New York later that year before being purchased by New York-based collectors Gloria and Richard Manney. The couple included Beauty Revealed in the exhibition "Tokens of Affection: The Portrait Miniature in America" in 1990–1991, which toured to the Metropolitan Museum of Art (Met) in New York, the National Museum of American Art in Washington, D.C., and the Art Institute of Chicago.

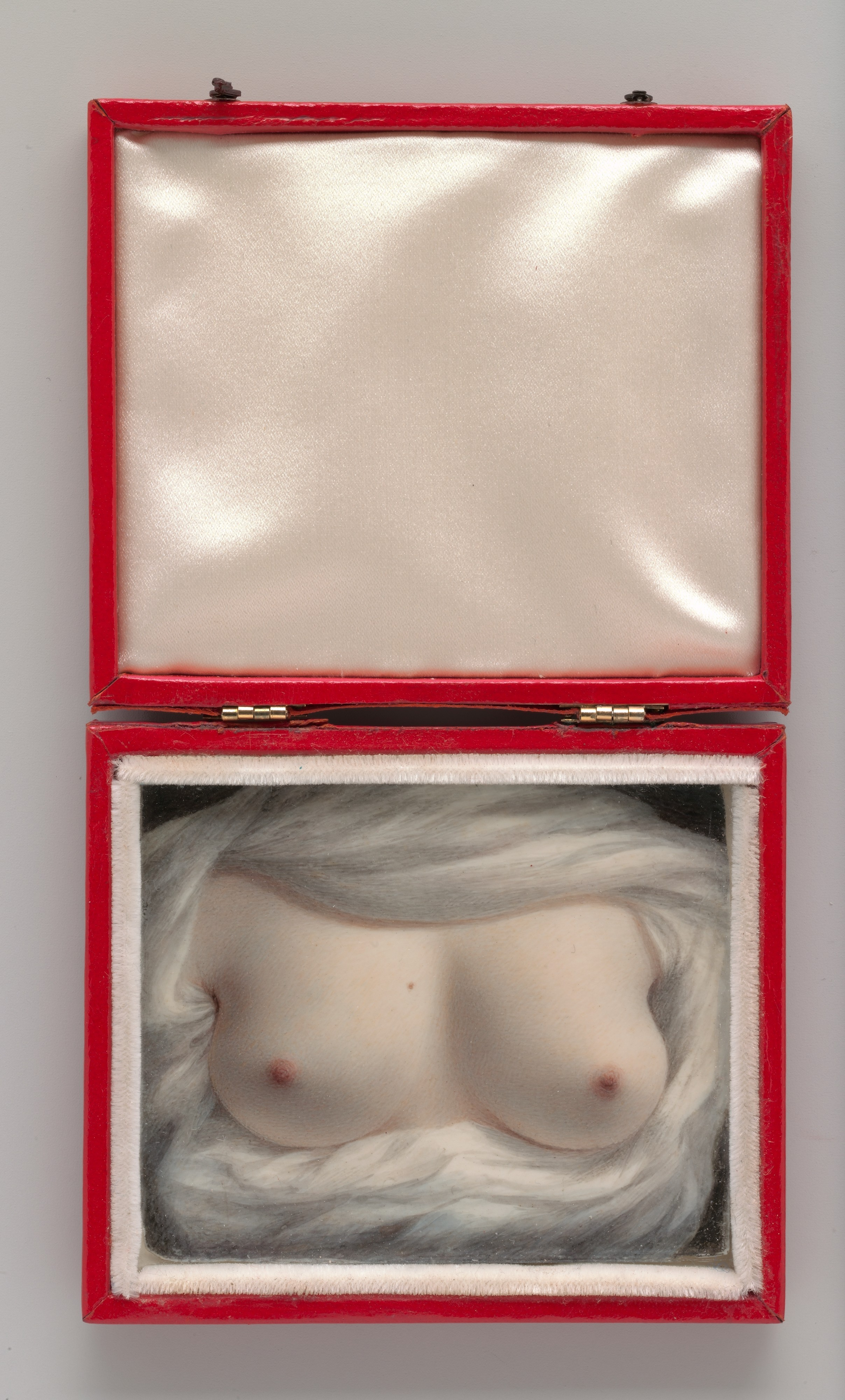
The painting in its case; a modern addition, the case replaced a paper backing.

Beauty Revealed was one of more than three hundred portrait miniatures collected by the couple, who gave it to the Met in 2006 as part of a gift/purchase arrangement. Carrie Rebora Barratt and Lori Zabar of the Met describe Goodridge's self-portrait as the most compelling of the "strange and wonderful" miniatures by minor artists in the collection. Two years later, Beauty Revealed was included in a retrospective, "The Philippe de Montebello Years: Curators Celebrate Three Decades of Acquisitions", which showcased works acquired under the tenure of retiring Met director Philippe de Montebello. Holland Cotter of The New York Times highlighted Goodridge's self-portrait, describing it as "remarkable". In 2008, authors Jane Kamensky and Jill Lepore drew inspiration from Beauty Revealed, as well as other paintings such as John Singleton Copley's A Boy with a Flying Squirrel, for their novel Blindspot. As of 2026, the Met's website lists Beauty Revealed as not on view; watercolor miniatures such as this are rarely exhibited owing to their fragility and sensitivity to light.

== Analysis ==
Several writers have examined Beauty Revealed as erotica. Updike described the painting as "a dazzling peep beneath another century's voluminous clothes". Writing in Antiques in 2012, Randall L. Holton and Charles A. Gilday said that the painting continued to present a self that evokes a "frisson of erotic possibility". In her biography of Goodridge, the art historian Elizabeth Kornhauser described the painting as simultaneously confrontational and erotic, arresting the viewer when seen in person. Discussing the painting, The Public Domain Review – an online journal dedicated to works in the public domain – described it as a "proto-sext" that is "so seductive, so intriguing, we cannot help but want to know the story behind it".

Analysis of Beauty Revealed has also explored it as a reflection of Goodridge and her abilities. The art historian Dale Johnson described the miniature as "strikingly realistic", demonstrative of the artist's ability to portray nuanced lights and shadows. He found the stippling and hatching used in creating the painting to be delicate. The critic Chris Packard wrote that Beauty Revealed served as a sort of visual synecdoche, representing the entirety of Goodridge through her breasts. As opposed to the "burdened" 1845 self-portrait and the non-eroticized one of 1830, he found Beauty Revealed to foreground Goodridge and her demand for attention. Holding that the clothing drew viewers' focus to the breasts, simultaneously abstracting and erasing the rest of Goodridge's body, he argued that the work challenged the assumptions and stereotypes regarding the demure, homebound 19th-century woman. Similarly, Nichols argued that Beauty Revealed exposed the "confidence and passions of a woman way ahead of her time, who has proudly embraced the eroticism of her body and role as cherished mistress", rather than burdening herself with the expectations of a politician's wife.

== Works cited ==
- Aiken, Carol (1990). "Materials and Techniques of the American Portrait Miniaturist". American Portrait Miniatures in the Manney Collection. New York: Metropolitan Museum of Art. pp. 27–37. ISBN 978-0-87099-598-9.
- Barratt, Carrie Rebora (October 2004). "American Portrait Miniatures of the Nineteenth Century". Heilbrunn Timeline of Art History. Metropolitan Museum of Art. Archived from the original on April 18, 2025.
- Barratt, Carrie Rebora; Zabar, Lori (2010). American Portrait Miniatures in the Metropolitan Museum of Art. New Haven, Connecticut: Yale University Press. ISBN 978-0-300-14895-4.
- "Beauty Revealed". Heilbrunn Timeline of Art History. Metropolitan Museum of Art. Archived from the original on October 6, 2014.
- "Beauty Revealed". Metropolitan Museum of Art. Archived from the original on June 15, 2026.
- "Christie's". International Art Market. 21 (10). New York: 219. October 1981.
- Cotter, Holland (October 23, 2008). "A Banquet of World Art, 30 Years in the Making". The New York Times. Archived from the original on June 15, 2026.
- Gerhold, Emily (2012). American Beauties: The Cult of the Bosom in Early Republican Art and Society (PhD thesis). Virginia Commonwealth University. doi:10.25772/R95A-7S20. Archived from the original on November 18, 2024.
- Holton, Randall L.; Gilday, Charles A. (November–December 2012). "Sarah Goodrich: Mapping Places in the Heart". Antiques. Archived from the original on February 21, 2025.
- Johnson, Dale T. (1990). American Portrait Miniatures in the Manney Collection. New York: Metropolitan Museum of Art. ISBN 978-0-87099-598-9.
- Kamensky, Jane; Lepore, Jill (April 2009). "Facts and Fictions in Revolutionary Boston". Common-place. 9 (3). American Antiquarian Society. Archived from the original on January 25, 2025.
- Kornhauser, Elizabeth (2022). "Sarah Goodridge". In Eldredge, Charles C. (ed.). The Unforgettables: Expanding the History of American Art. Berkeley: University of California Press. pp. 33–38. ISBN 978-0-520-38557-3.
- Nichols, Chelsea (April 29, 2019). "A Saucy Self-Portrait from 1828". The Museum of Ridiculously Interesting Things. Archived from the original on January 21, 2024.
- Packard, Chris (October 2003). "Self-Fashioning in Sarah Goodridge's Self-Portraits". Common-place. 4 (1). American Antiquarian Society. Archived from the original on January 24, 2025.
- Remini, Robert V. (1997). Daniel Webster: The Man and His Time. New York: W.W. Norton & Company. ISBN 978-0-393-04552-9.
- "Sarah Goodridge's Beauty Revealed (1828)". The Public Domain Review. February 5, 2020. Archived from the original on November 18, 2024.
- Solis-Cohen, Lita (April 21, 1991). "American Portrait Miniatures on View in Washington Museum". The Baltimore Sun. Archived from the original on October 6, 2014.
- Updike, John (2000). "The Revealed and the Concealed". More Matter: Essays and Criticism. New York: Fawcett Books. pp. 708–716. ISBN 978-0-449-00628-3.
- Walker, John Frederick (2009). Ivory's Ghosts: The White Gold of History and the Fate of Elephants. New York: Atlantic Monthly Press. ISBN 978-0-87113-995-5.
