= William M. Goodrich =

American organ builder

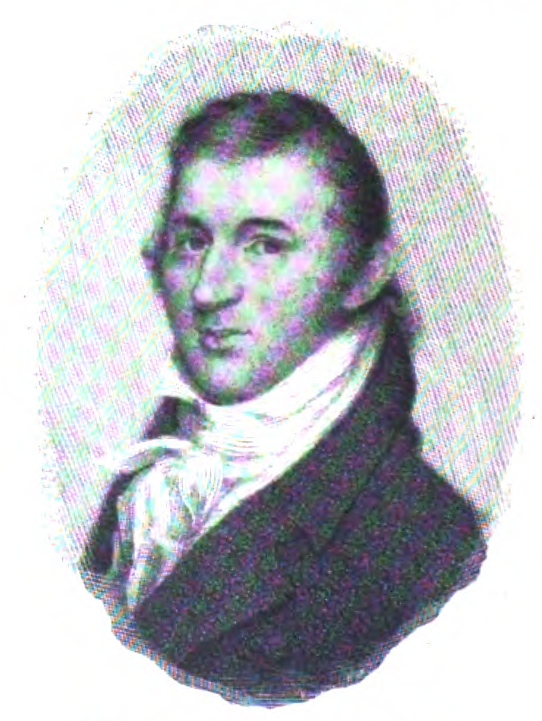
- Born: July 21, 1777; Templeton
- Died: September 15, 1833; East Cambridge
- Occupation: Organ building
- Relatives: Ebenezer Goodrich

William Marcellus Goodrich (July 21, 1777 in Templeton, Worcester County, Massachusetts – September 15, 1833) was an organ builder in the United States.

== Biography ==
He was the son of Ebenezer and Beulah Goodridge. His father was a farmer. As a young man, William changed his family name to "Goodrich" and added the middle name "Marcellus". At the age of 21, he began working for Benjamin Crehore, a maker of musical instruments. He duplicated Maelzel's panharmonium and traveled the countryside with that to exhibit it. In 1809 he moved to East Cambridge and established a factory.

His brother Ebenezer Goodrich worked with him for a time, as did his brother-in-law, cabinet maker Thomas Appleton (1785-1872, not to be confused with writer and artist Thomas Appleton). His sisters were artists Sarah Goodridge and Elizabeth Goodridge.

== Work ==
William M. Goodrich of Boston, Massachusetts, was an important American builder of a large number of notable pipe organs from its inception in 1805 until its closure in 1833. Goodrich had a major part in introducing free reeds.

"In June, 1811, Maelzel's Pan Harmonicon was brought to Boston, from Europe, and Mr. Goodrich was employed in putting it up, and in exhibiting it. In September, 1811, it was taken down, and removed to New-York, where it was put up for exhibition. In doing this, also, Mr. Goodrich was employed. It was afterwards removed to other cities;"

"* [...] Most of the dates, contained in this account of his life, were given by Mr. Goodrich to the writer, altogether from memory. It Is possible, therefore, that some portion of them may not be strictly persons, whose inclinations and pursuits corresponded with his own."

== See also ==
- Anton Reinlein
