= Gilbert Stuart (disambiguation) =

Gilbert Stuart (1755–1828) was an American painter from Rhode Island.

Gilbert Stuart may also refer to:

- Gilbert Stuart (writer) (1742–1786), Scottish journalist and historian
- Gilbert Stuart (Goodridge), a c. 1825 painting by Sarah Goodridge
- SS Gilbert Stuart, on the List of Allied vessels struck by Japanese special attack weapons during World War II

== See also ==
- Gilbert Stuart Birthplace, a museum located in Saunderstown, Rhode Island
