= Elkanah Tisdale =

American cartoonist

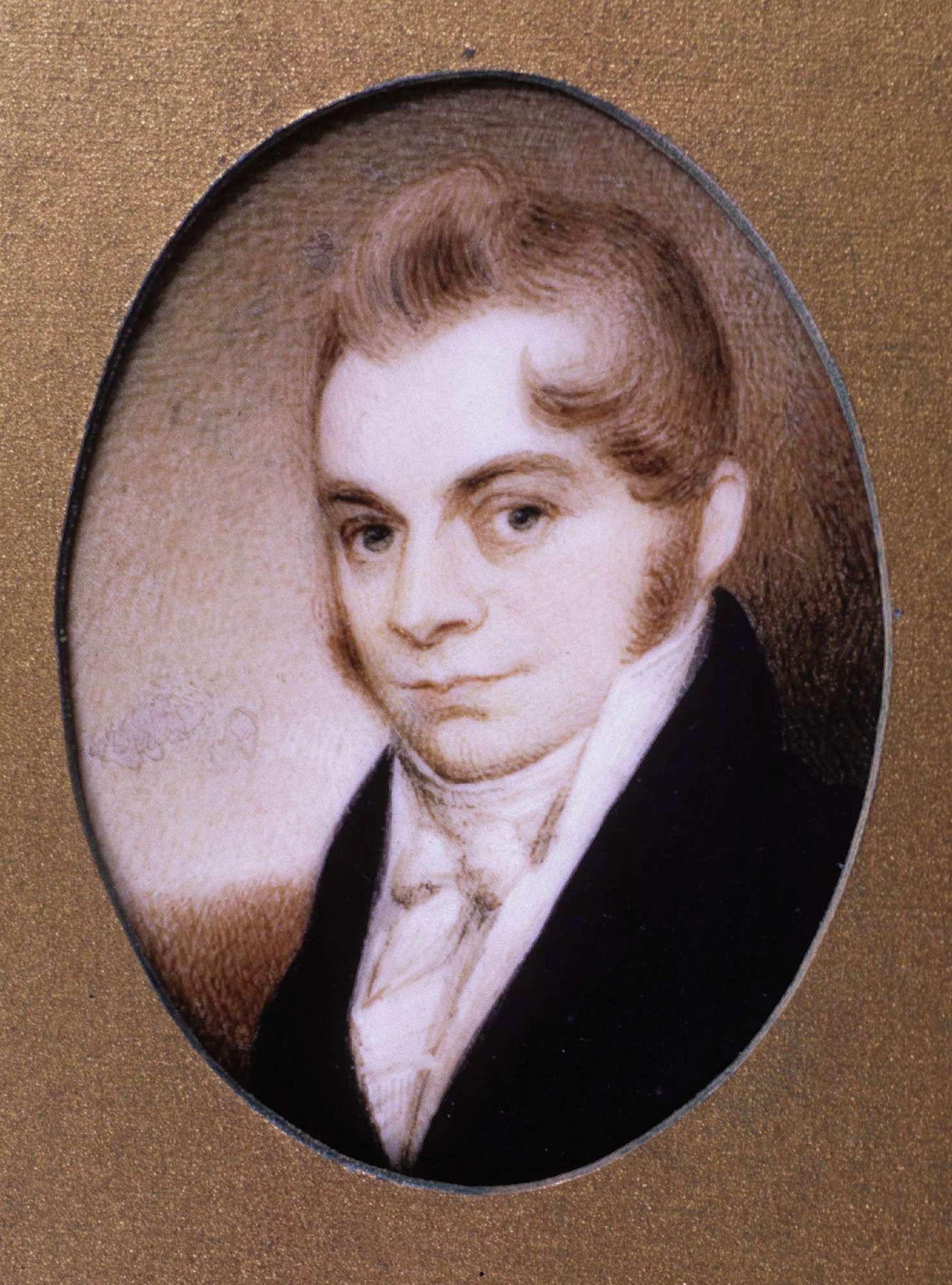
- Portrait of the Artist, undated, in the Detroit Institute of Arts
- Born: 1768; Lebanon, Connecticut
- Died: 1835 (aged 66–67); Norwich, Connecticut
- Occupations: Engraver, miniaturist, cartoonist
- Known for: The Gerry-Mander

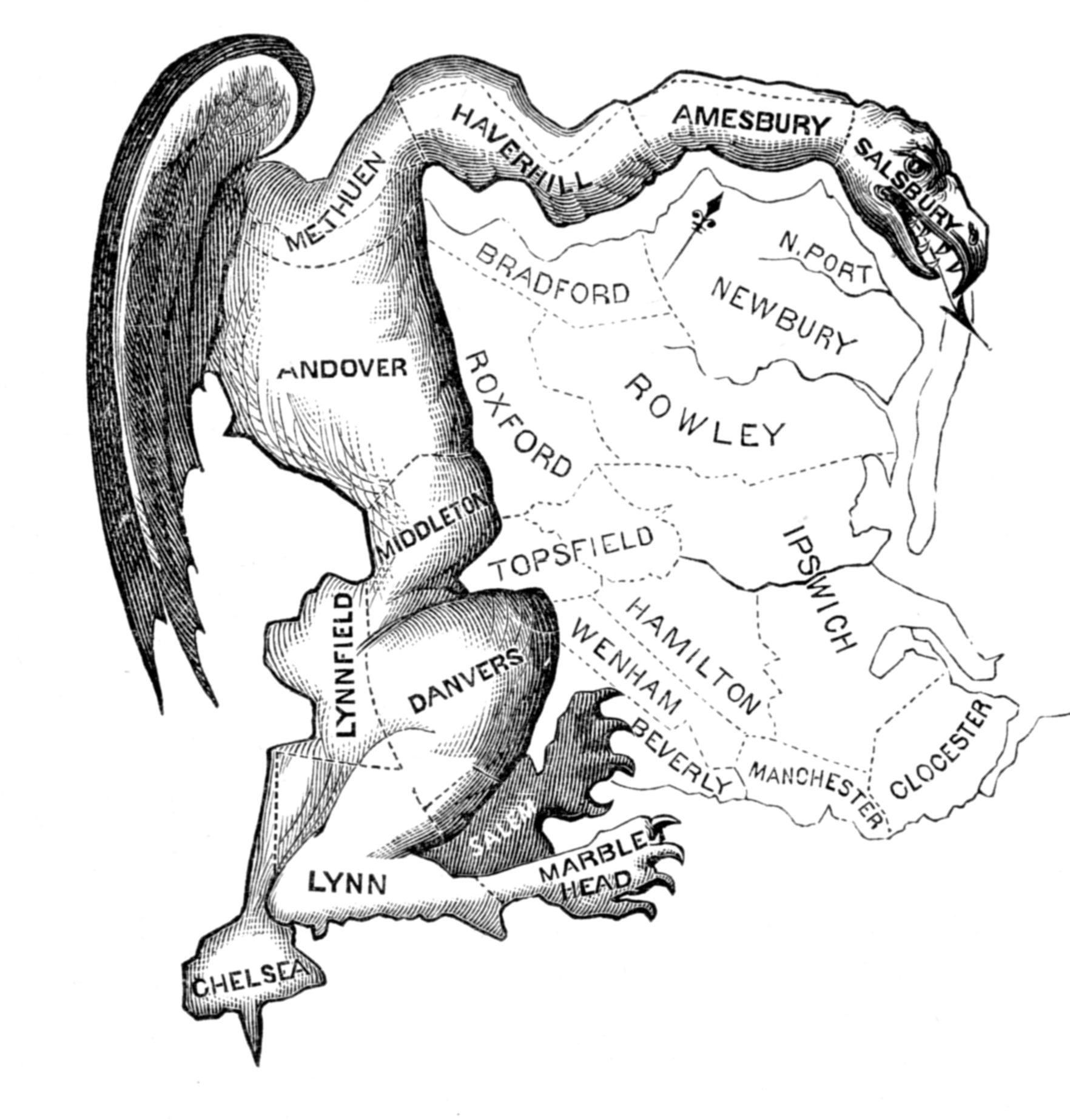
The Gerry-Mander (1812)

Elkanah Tisdale (1768 – May 1, 1835) was an American engraver, miniature painter and cartoonist. He was known for the famous cartoon "The Gerry-Mander", published in the Boston Gazette on March 26, 1812, which led to the coining of the term gerrymandering. (Note: Under Democrat-Republican Governor Elbridge Gerry in 1812 the Massachusetts Democrat-Republicans arranged for the state electoral districts to be redrawn to make it harder for the Federalist majority to win the state senatorial elections. There was a public outcry, and Gerry was voted out of office, although later he was elected Vice-President to James Madison. The cartoon shows one of the two new Essex County districts decorated to resemble a salamander, with the name a pun combining the governor's name with that of the mythical beast.)

== Biography ==
Elkanah Tisdale was born in 1768 (Note: Some sources give his date of birth as 1768. Others gave a date of around 1771.) in Lebanon, Connecticut. His father ran a wagon shop in Lebanon before moving to New York City in 1794, and Elkanah probably worked for him as a carriage painter. Tisdale was based in New York from 1794 to 1798, where he described himself as "Engraver and miniature painter". After 1798 he called himself a miniature painter. Some sources say that he met Benjamin Trott in 1798, and the two friends left New York and stayed in Albany for a few months to avoid an epidemic of yellow fever. From that time he alternated between Connecticut and New York City.

In 1798 he founded the Hartford Engraving Company in Hartford, Connecticut. He joined the Graphic Co. in Hartford, an association of engravers, though he designed vignettes but did not engrave them. He probably met and taught the future miniaturist Anson Dickinson in the early 1800s. From 1813 to 1818 he worked in Boston. In 1818 he exhibited two miniatures at the New York American Academy of the Fine Arts. He moved to Hartford in 1818. In 1820 he was designing and engraving plates for Samuel Griswold Goodrich in Hartford. He returned to Lebanon around 1823. His engraving of the Convention at Philadelphia appeared in an 1823 edition of A History of the United States. He died in 1835 in Norwich, Connecticut.

== Work ==
Some of Tisdale's earliest works were his full-page illustrations in John Trumbull's McFingal, which was published in New York in 1795. According to David McNeely Stauffer in his American Engravers on Copper and Steel, "Tisdale worked in both line and stipple; but his plates possess little merit ... Tisdale was a better designer than engraver, and he claimed to be a painter in his early life, though his best work was in the line of miniature portrait painting."

== Notes and references ==
Notes

Citations

Sources

- Barratt, Carrie Rebora; Zabar, Lori (2010). "Anson Dickinson". American Portrait Miniatures in The Metropolitan Museum of Art. Metropolitan Museum of Art. ISBN 978-1-58839-357-9.
- "Convention at Philadelphia". Ashbrook Center at Ashland University.
- "The Gerry-mander / A new species of Monster, which appeared in Essex South District in January last". Boston Map Society. Archived from the original on April 24, 2012.
