= Royal Ralph Hinman =

American politician, lawyer and antiquarian (1785-1868)

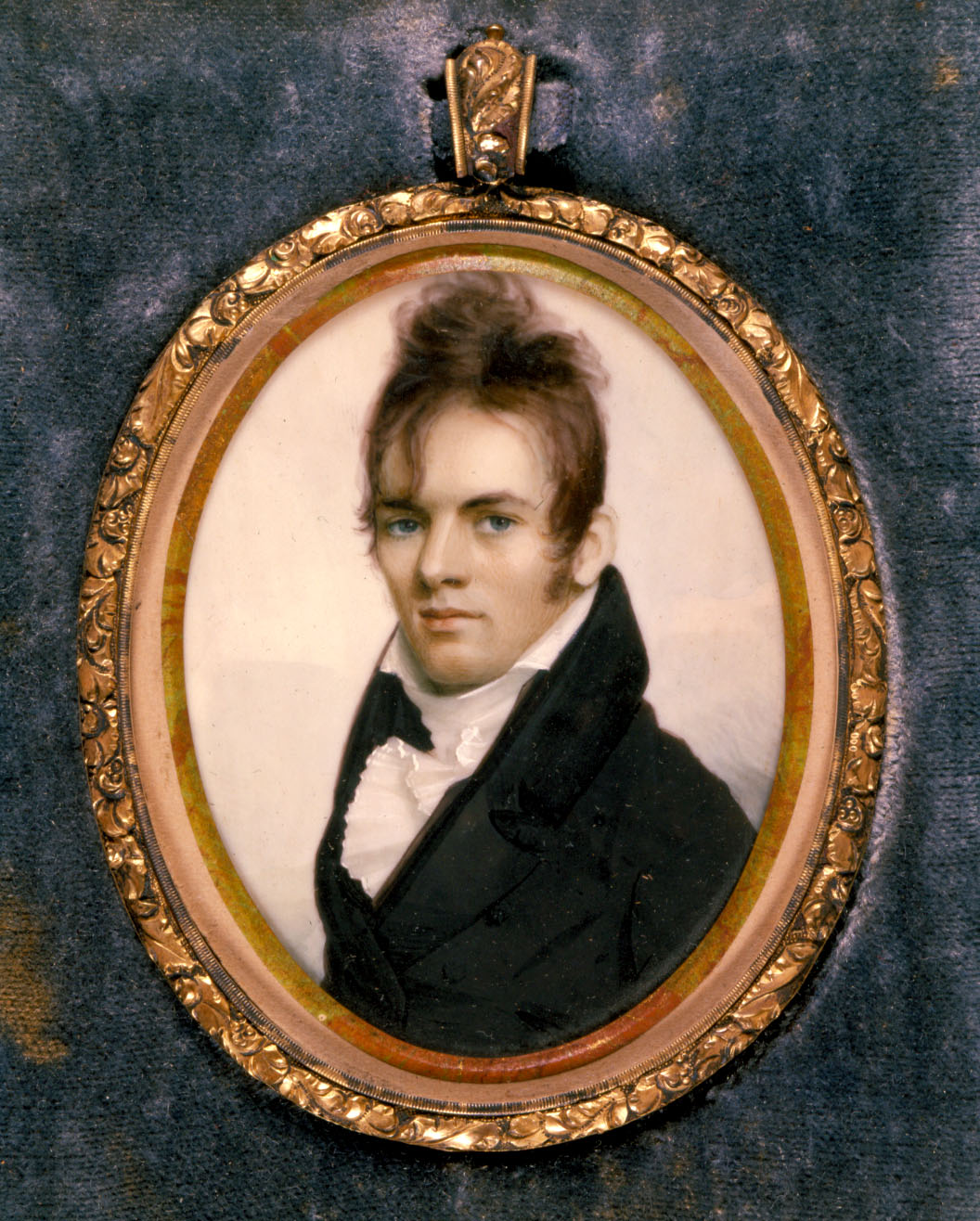
- Portrait of Hinman by Anson Dickinson
- Born: June 20, 1785; Southbury, Connecticut
- Died: October 16, 1868 (aged 83)
- Occupation: Lawyer
- Known for: Antiquarian writings

Royal Ralph Hinman (June 20, 1785 – October 16, 1868) was an American lawyer and antiquarian who held various public offices in Connecticut, and who wrote on antiquarian subjects.

== Biography ==
Royal Ralph Hinman was born in 1785 in Southbury, Connecticut, the son of General Ephraim Hinman, a successful Connecticut merchant, and Sylvania (French) Hinman. He graduated Yale College in 1804, and Litchfield Law School in 1806, where he studied law with David Sherman Boardman and Noah B. Benedict. In 1808 he was admitted to the bar in Litchfield County Court, and began to practice law in Roxbury, Connecticut.

In 1814, Hinman married Lydia Ashley Hinman. He was elected a Connecticut State Representative in 1814, 1825 and 1831. He was Postmaster of Roxbury from 1823 to 1833 and was Secretary of the State of Connecticut from 1825 to 1842. Between 1835 and 1836 he was a member of the Committee to Revise Public Statutes of Connecticut. In September 1844, the Port of New Haven appointed him the Collector of Customs.

== Works ==
The Committee to Revise Public Statutes of Connecticut included Hinman, Leman Church and the Hon. Elisha Phelps. Between 1835 and 1836 they compiled and published 1640 pages on the private of special acts of the state. In 1838 Hinman and Thomas Clap Perkins revised and published the Statutes of Connecticut Revisions of 1838, in 717 pages. Hinman was a member of the Connecticut, Massachusetts, and New Jersey state historical societies. He published many historical works including the Antiquities of Connecticut and A Historical Collection of the Part Sustained by Connecticut During the War of the Revolution. He contributed many Connecticut articles to The New England Historical and Genealogical Register during its early years. His Catalogue of the Names of the First Puritan Settlers of the Colony of Connecticut was deemed of sufficient importance to be republished in 2015 (with a revised title) by the New England Historic Genealogical Society.

== Bibliography ==
- Hinman, Royal Ralph; Phelps, Elisha; Church, Leman; John Hooker; J. Judson Dimock; Jared B. Foster (1837). Resolves and Private Laws of the State of Connecticut. J.B. Eldridge.
- Hinman, Royal Ralph (1838). The Blue laws of New Haven colony: usually called Blue laws of Connecticut; Quaker laws of Plymouth and Massachusetts; Blue laws of New York, Maryland, Virginia, and South Carolina. First record of Connecticut; interesting extracts from Connecticut records; cases of Salem witchcraft; charges and banishment of Rev. Roger Williams, &c.; and other interesting and instructive antiquities. Compiled by an antiquarian. Case, Tiffany.
- Burrows, Russel E.; Ellsworth, William Wolcott; Hinman, Royal Ralph (1839). Commissions of Russel E. Burrows.
- Beach, John; Perkins, Thomas Clap; Hinman, Royal Ralph (1839). The public statute laws of the state of Connecticut: compiled in obedience to a resolve of the General assembly, passed May 1838, to which is prefixed the Declaration of Independence, Constitution of the United States, and Constitution of the state of Connecticut. Published by the authority of the state. John L. Boswell.
- Hinman, Royal Ralph (1842). A Historical Collection from Official Records, Files, Etc, of the Part Sustained by Connecticut During the War of the Revolution. General Books. ISBN 978-1-150-13757-0.
- Hinman, Royal Ralph (1846). A Catalogue of the Names of the First Puritan Settlers of Connecticut, from 1635 to 1665: Collected from State, Town, and Probate Records. E. Gleason.
- Hinman, Royal Ralph (1856). A Family Record of the Descendants of Sergt. Edward Hinman: Who First Appeared at Stratford in Connecticut, about 1650. Collected from State, Colony, Town and Church Records: Also, from Old Bibles and Aged People. Press of Case, Lockwood.
- Hinman, Royal Ralph (October 2009). Letters from the English Kings and Queens, Charles II, James II, William and Mary, Anne, George II. BiblioLife. ISBN 978-1-116-38912-8.
- Hinman, Royal Ralph (January 2010). A Catalogue of the Names of the First Puritan Settlers of the Colony of Connecticut (Volume 3); With the Time of Their Arrival in the Colony. General Books. ISBN 978-1-153-31926-3.
- Hinman, Royal Ralph (1910). A Part of the Early Marriages, Births, and Baptisms in Hartford, Ct., from Record.

== Notes and references ==
Citations

Political offices
Preceded by Thomas Day	Secretary of the State of Connecticut; 1835–1842	Succeeded by Noah A. Phelps

Sources

- Genealogies of Connecticut Families. Genealogical Publishing Com. 1983. p. 8. ISBN 978-0-8063-1030-5.
- "Royal Ralph Hinman". The Ledger. Litchfield Historical Society.
