= Gilbert Stuart (Goodridge) =

1825 painting by Sarah Goodridge

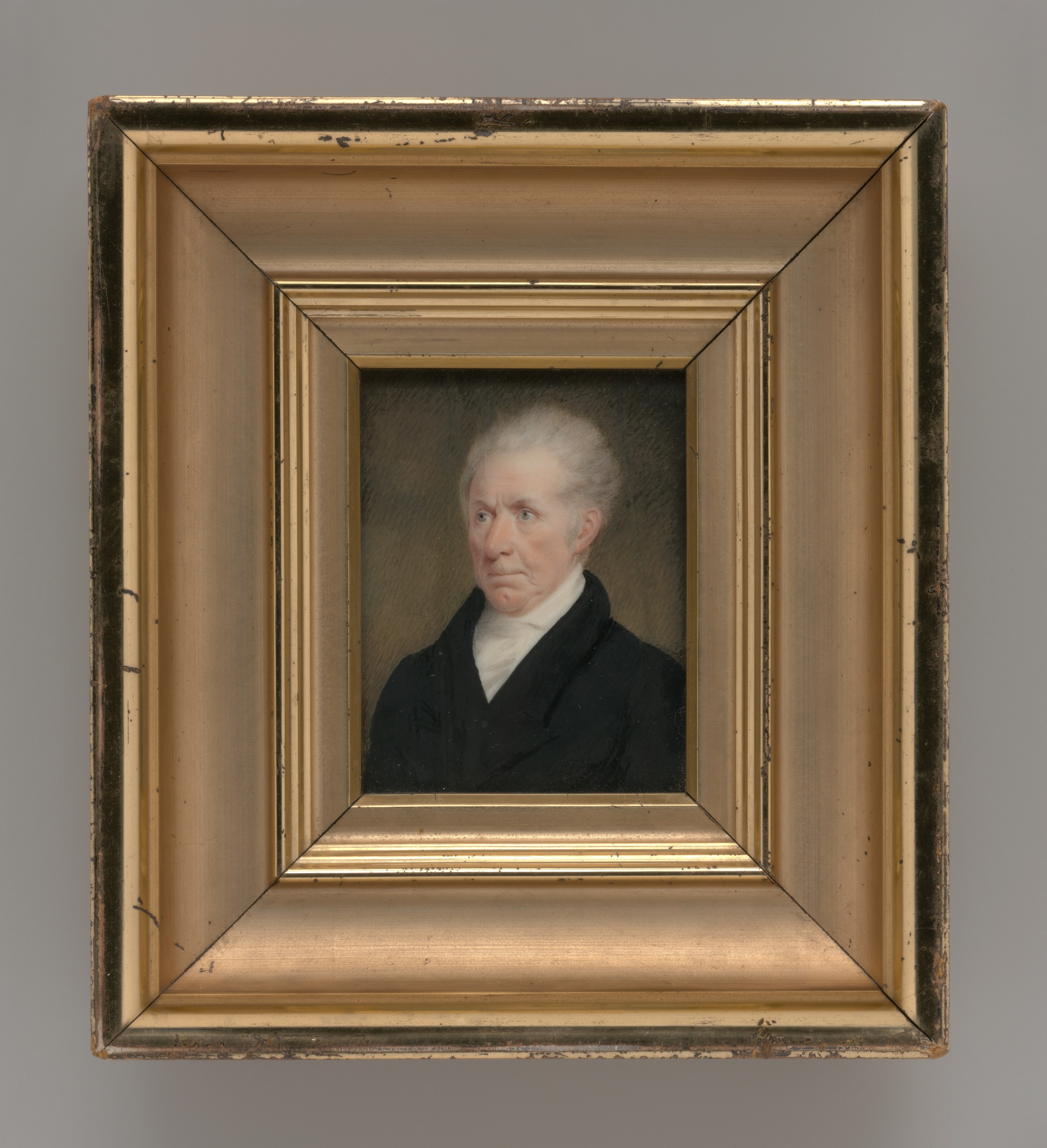
- Artist: Sarah Goodridge
- Year: c. 1825
- Dimensions: 9.3 cm (3.7 in) × 7 cm (2.8 in)
- Location: Metropolitan Museum of Art
- Accession No.: 95.14.123
- Identifiers: The Met object ID: 10956

Gilbert Stuart is a painting by Sarah Goodridge. It is in the collection of the Metropolitan Museum of Art.

Sarah Goodridge was a miniature portrait painter, who studied with noted American painter Gilbert Stuart. In 1825, he commissioned a portrait from her. This miniature is in the Smithsonian American Art Museum. The portrait bust faces obliquely left. It was described by family as "the most lifelike of anything ever painted of him in this country".

Goodridge made copies of the work, which are now in the Metropolitan Museum, Museum of Fine Arts, and National Portrait Gallery. The Metropolitan Museum version was collected by Moses Lazarus.
