= Sarah Goodridge =

American artist (1788–1853)

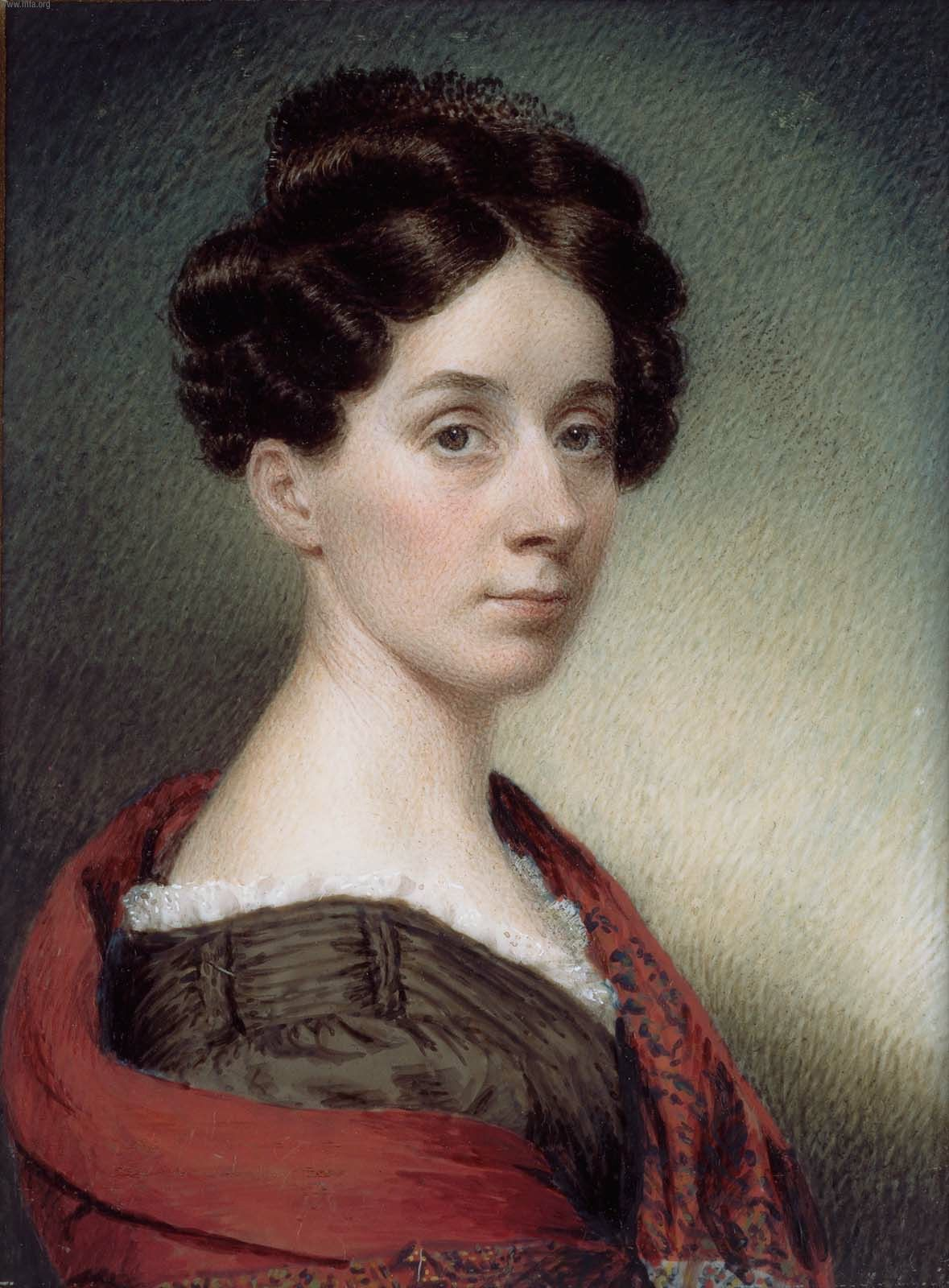
- Self-portrait (1830)
- Born: February 5, 1788; Templeton, Massachusetts, US
- Died: December 28, 1853 (aged 65); Boston, Massachusetts, US
- Other name: Sarah Goodrich
- Known for: Portrait miniature

Sarah Goodridge (February 5, 1788 – December 28, 1853; also referred to as Sarah Goodrich) was an American painter who specialized in portrait miniatures. She was the older sister of Elizabeth Goodridge, also an American miniaturist.

== Life ==
Goodridge was born in Templeton, Massachusetts, the sixth child and third daughter of Ebenezer Goodridge and his wife Beulah Childs. At an early age, she began drawing and showed an aptitude for art. Women's educational opportunities were limited at the time and where Goodridge lived, so she was largely a self-taught artist. She attended the local district school. Her early sketches of people around her were on birch bark since she lacked the resources to purchase paper. She stayed with her brother, William M. Goodrich, for a few months in Milton, and attended a boarding school there. She also got a few drawing lessons in Boston where she accompanied her brother. In Boston, she also met Gilbert Stuart who took an interest in her work. He critiqued her work, gave her instruction in technique, and in 1825 she made a portrait of him, which he claimed to be the only true likeness ever done of him. She had various famous subjects for her miniatures including General Henry Lee, Theophilus Parsons, Isaiah Thomas, Daniel Webster, and General Henry Knox.

In 1820, she went to live with her sister Eliza in Boston and began receiving lessons and painting miniature portraits. She earned enough from commissions to support herself and her family for several decades. She eventually specialized in miniatures painted on ivory, getting lessons from a Hartford miniaturist, almost certainly Elkanah Tisdale. Her paintings were exhibited in Boston and Washington, D.C.

Goodridge became well known for her portraits of politician Daniel Webster and fellow artist Gilbert Stuart. Among Goodridge's works is a miniature portrait of her own bared breasts, titled Beauty Revealed, now in the Metropolitan Museum of Art in New York. The miniature was painted on a sliver of ivory that measured just 2 5/8 by 3 1/8 inches. Executed in 1828, it was presented by the artist to her close friend, correspondent, and occasional subject, Webster. The work was included in the retrospective "The Philippe de Montebello Years: Curators Celebrate Three Decades of Acquisitions." It was the inspiration for a miniature painted by the fictional heroine of Blindspot: A Novel (New York, 2008), by Jane Kamensky and Jill Lepore. Despite her relationship with Webster, of whom she was rumoured to be his mistress, Goodridge remained unmarried.

After her eyesight failed in 1851, she retired from painting and settled in Reading, Massachusetts. She died in December 1853 during a Christmas visit to Boston.

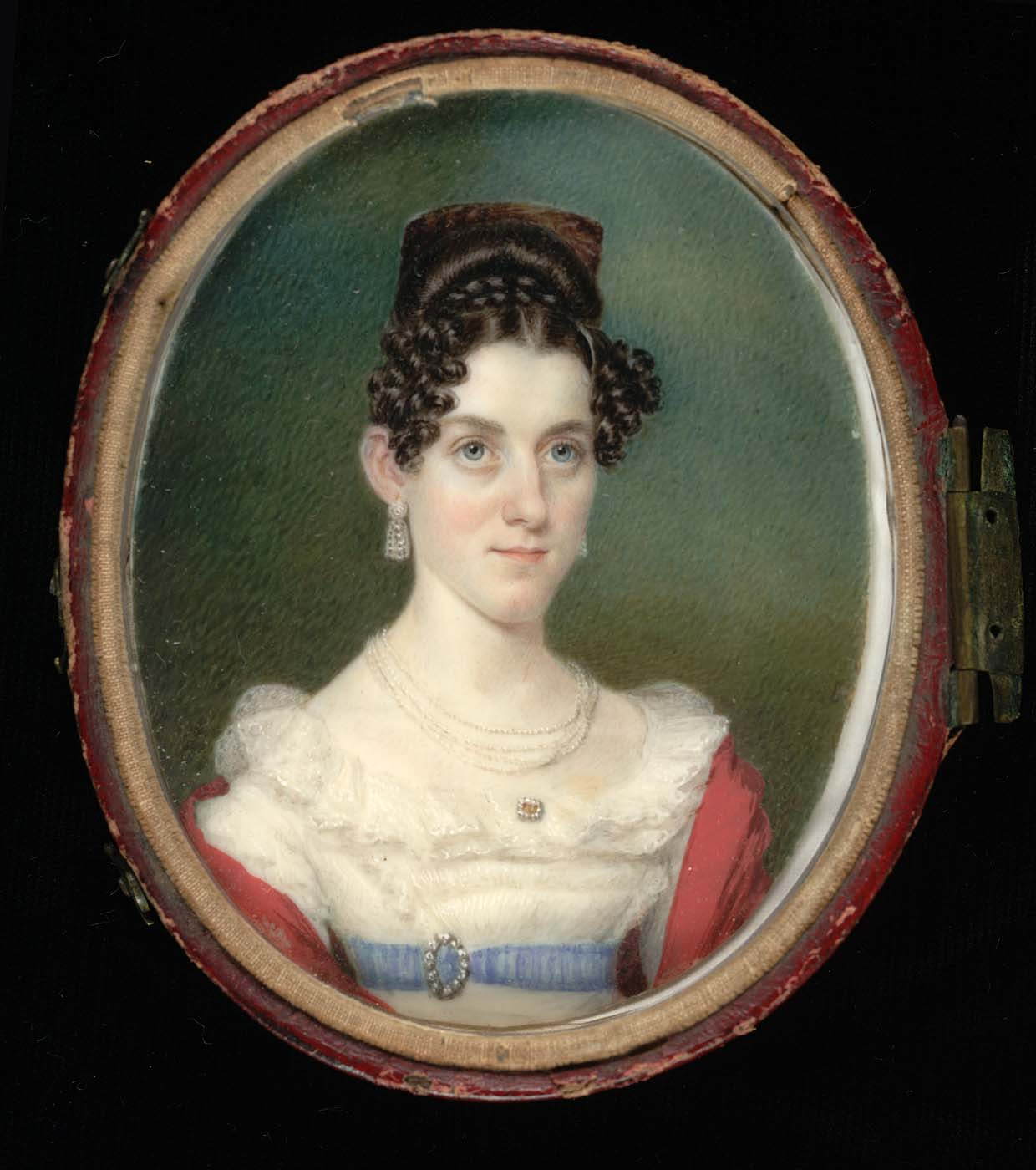
Matilda, circa 1825

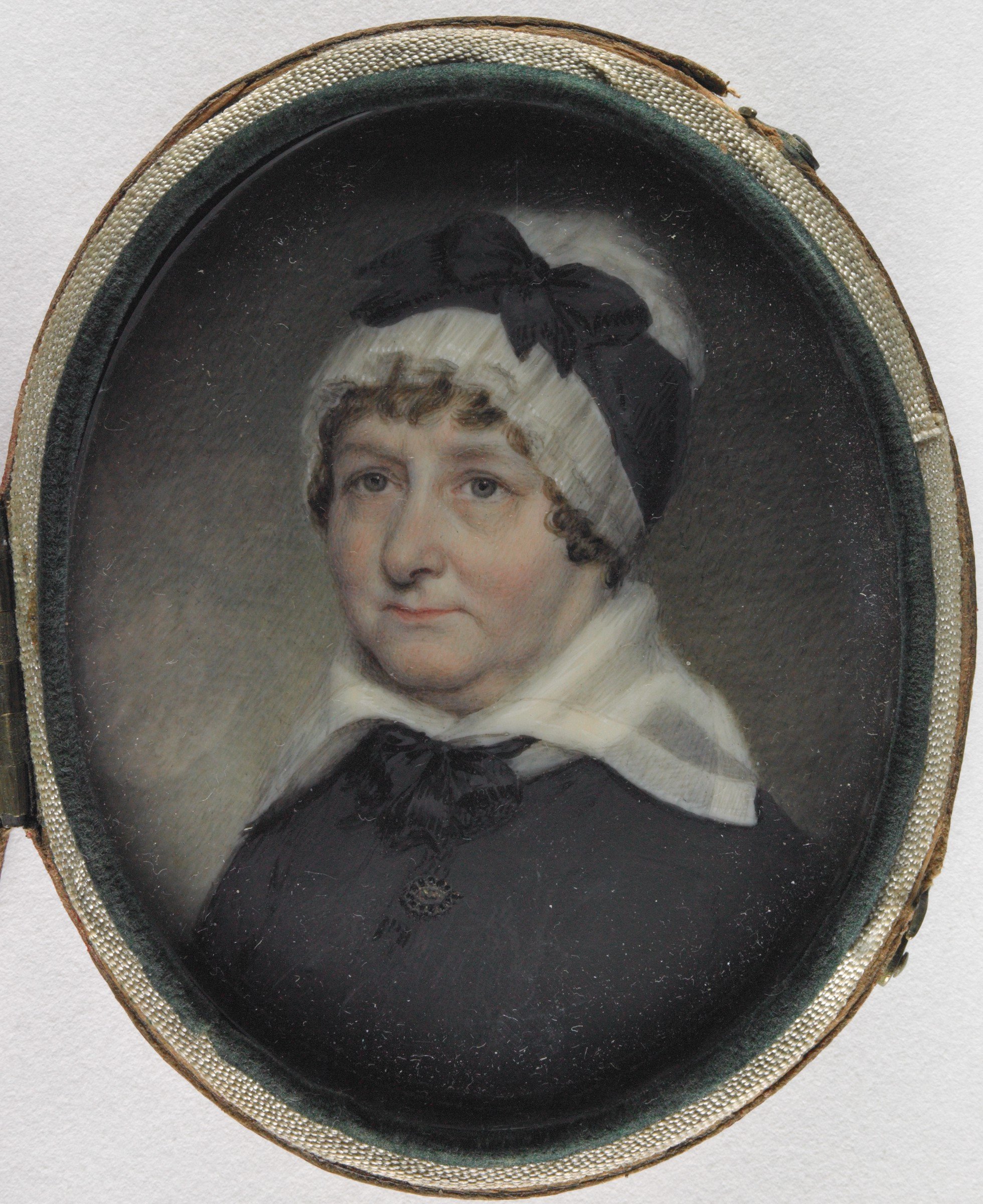
Elizabeth Greenleaf Parsons

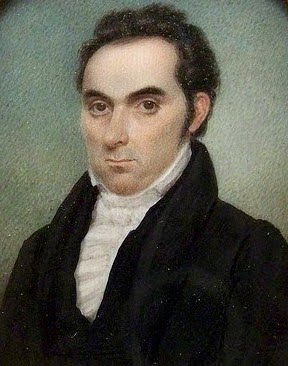
Portrait of Daniel Webster, 1825

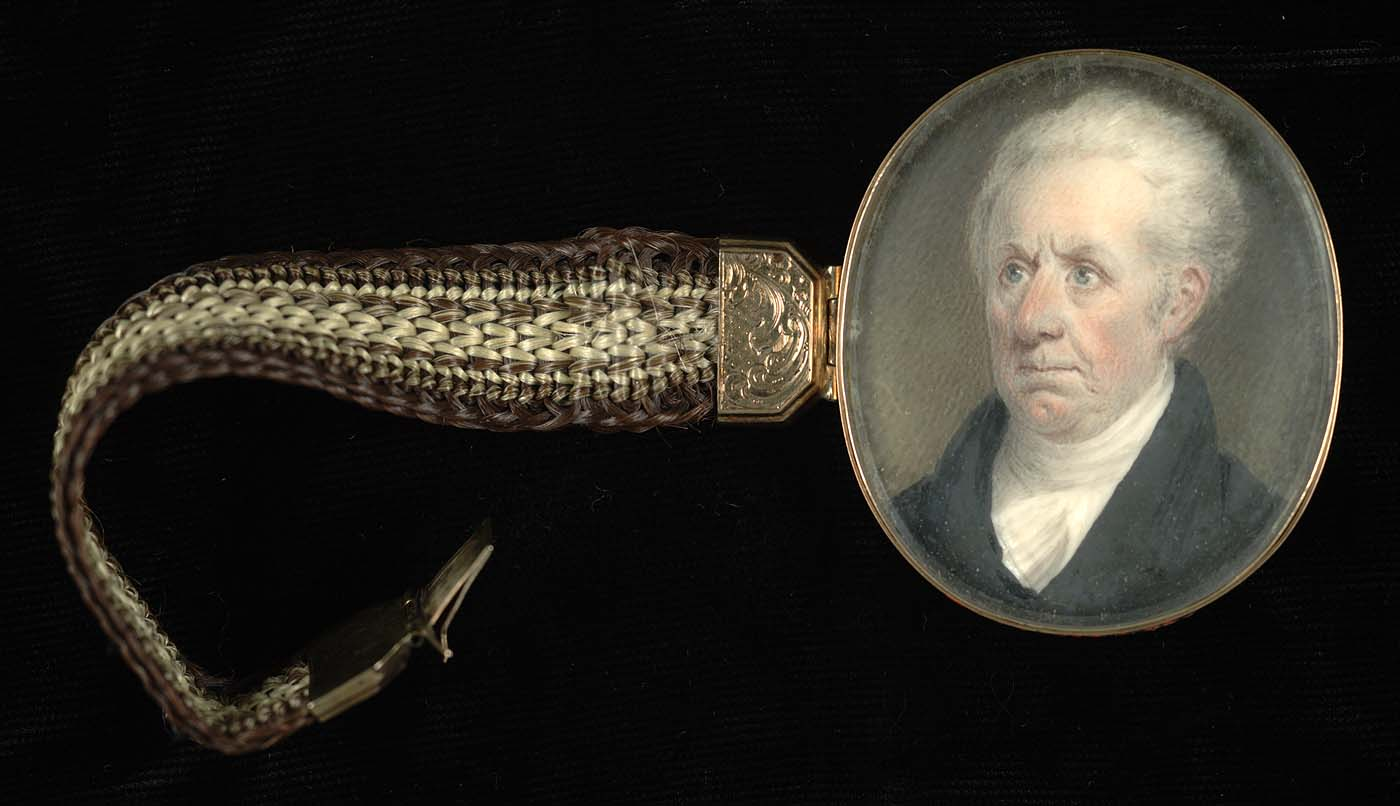
Gilbert Stuart, miniature on a fob

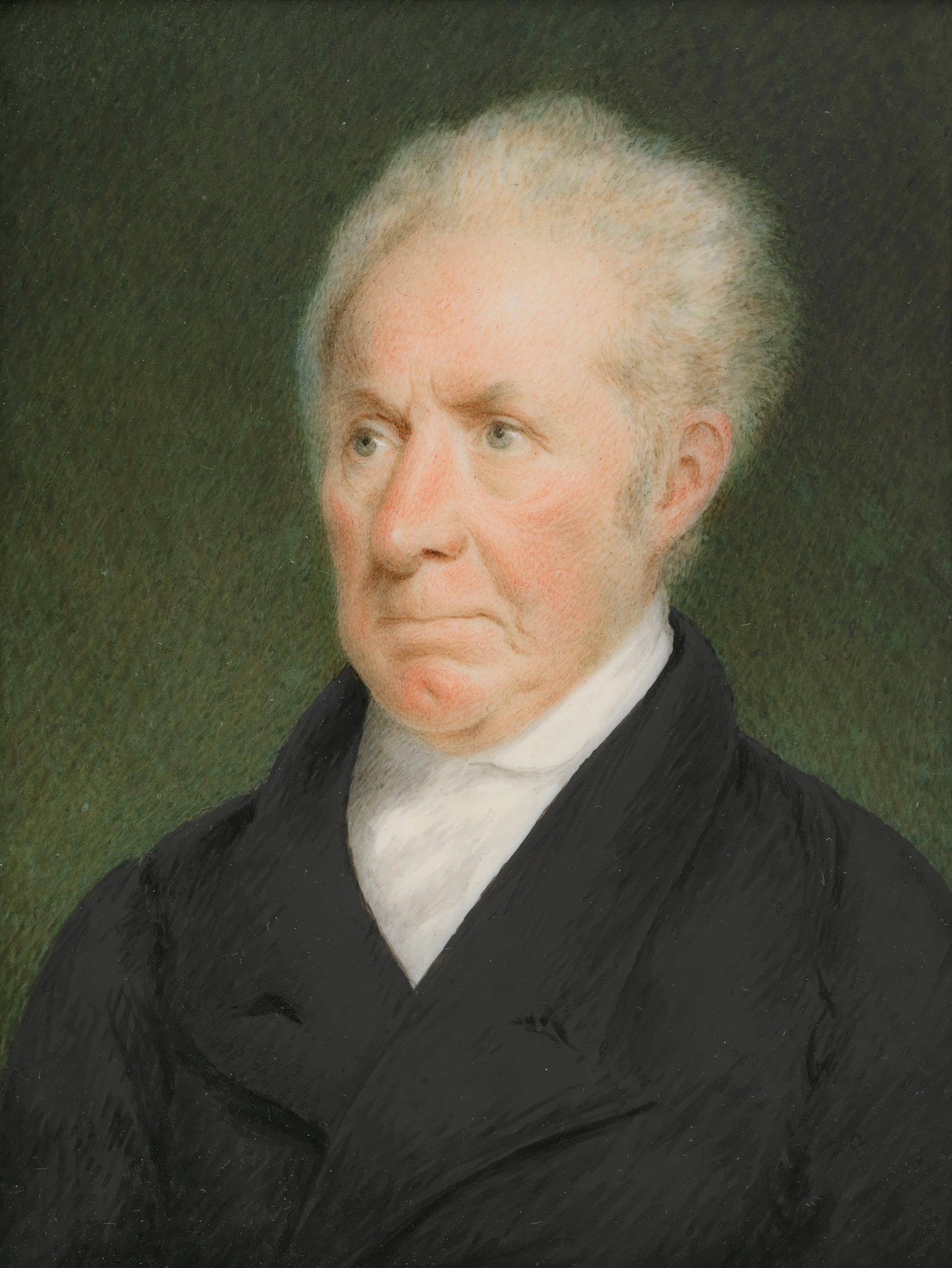
Portrait of Gilbert Stuart, 1825

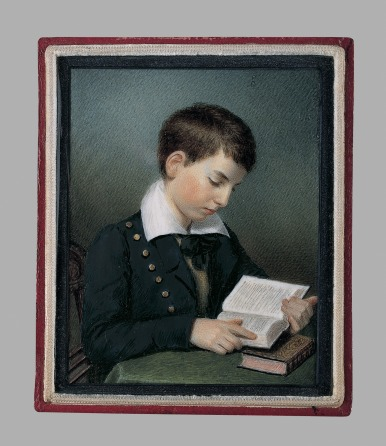
The Studious Youth (Edward Appleton)

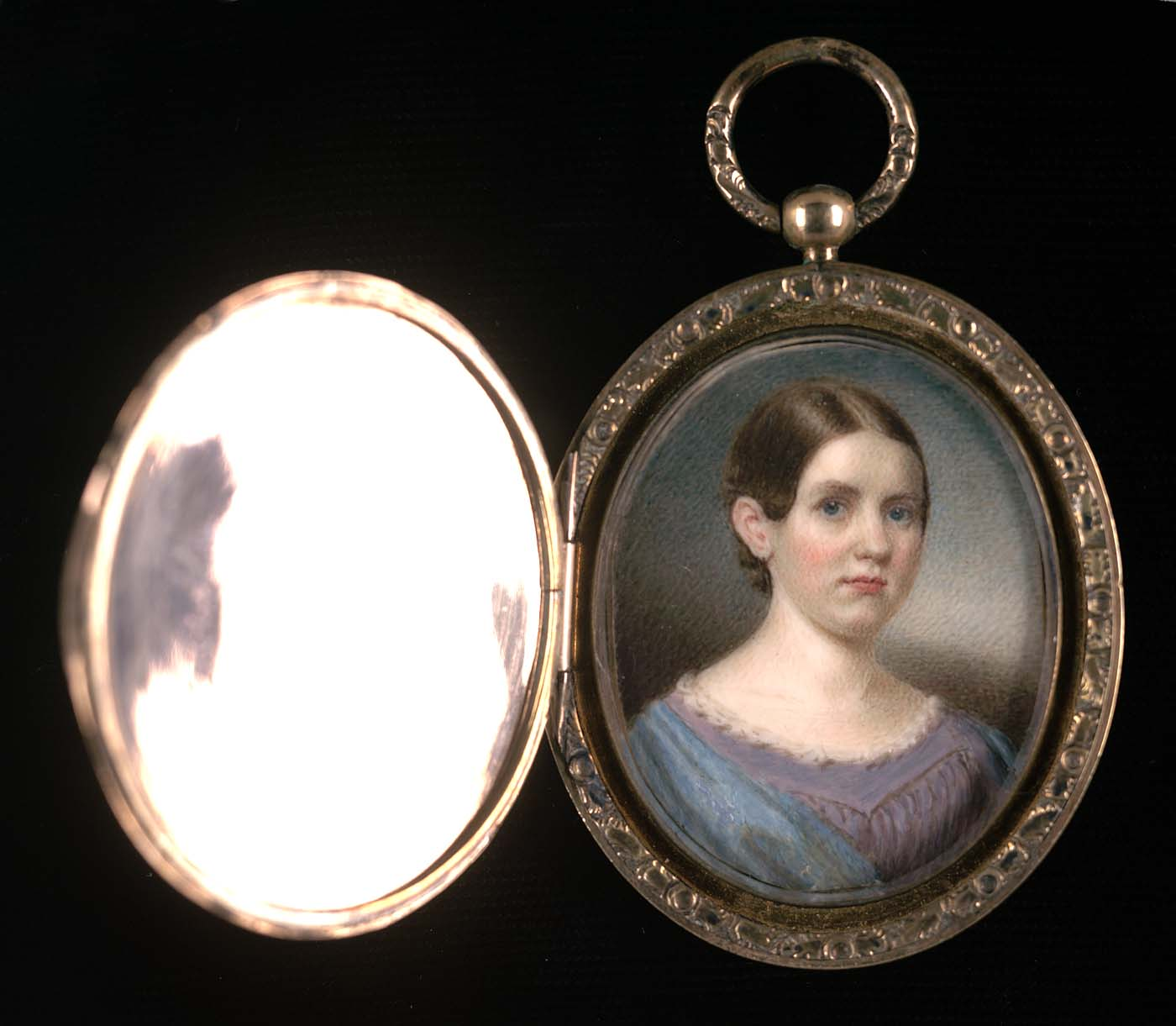
Emily Appleton

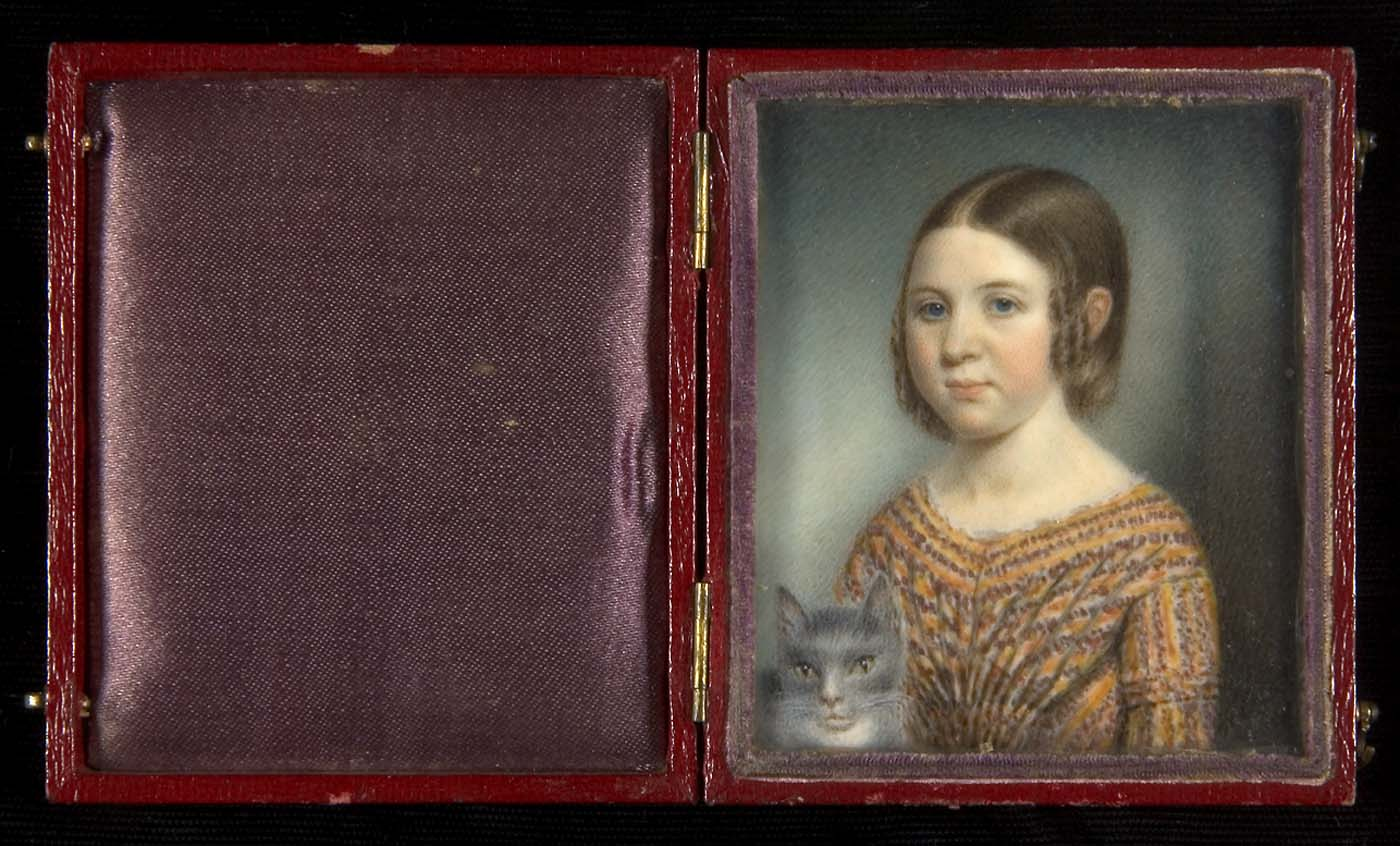
Beulah Appleton and her cat

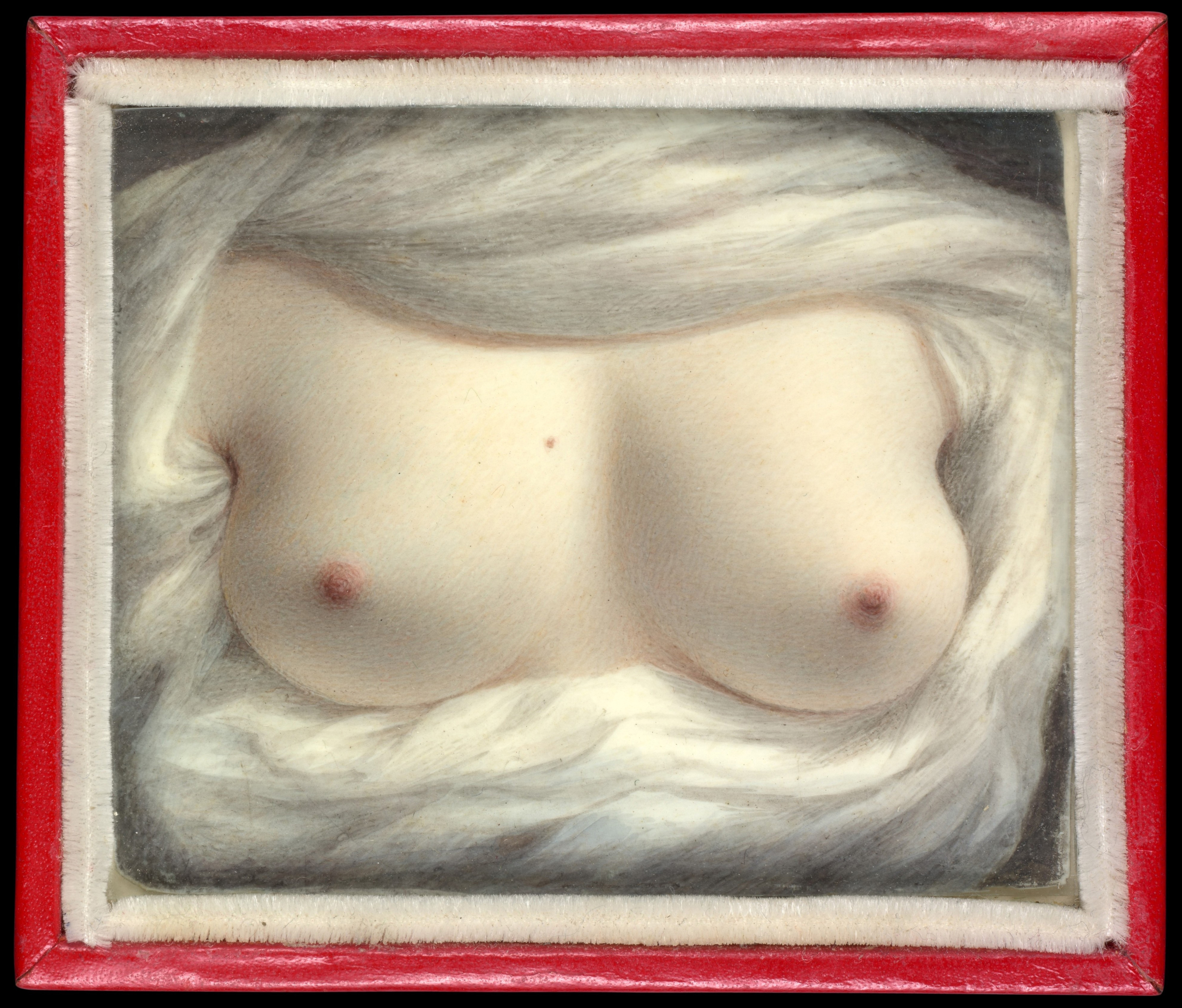
Beauty Revealed, 1828 self-portrait, Metropolitan Museum of Art
