= Elizabeth Goodridge =

American painter (1798–1882)

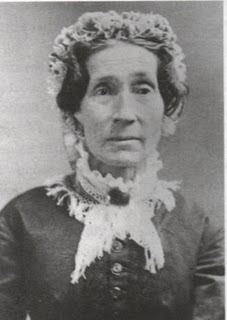
- Elizabeth Goodridge, c. 1870
- Born: Elizabeth Goodridge; March 12, 1798; Templeton, Massachusetts
- Died: April 18, 1882 (aged 84); Reading, Massachusetts
- Known for: Miniaturist
- Spouse: Ephriam Stone (m. 1849)

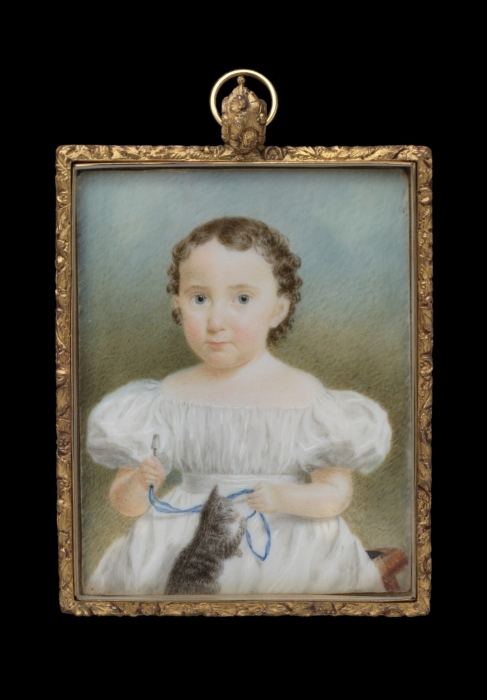
Portrait miniature of Julia Porter Dwight by Elizabeth Goodridge, c. 1832. Yale University Art Gallery

Elizabeth Goodridge (March 12, 1798 – April 18, 1882) was an American painter who specialized in miniatures. She was the younger sister of Sarah Goodridge, also an American miniaturist.

== Early life ==
Goodridge was born in Templeton, Massachusetts, the seventh child and fourth daughter of Ebenezer Goodridge and his wife Beulah Childs. Eliza's earliest miniatures date from the late 1820s and are similar in style to her sister's work, although not as technically advanced. At an early age, she began drawing and showed an aptitude for art. Women's educational opportunities were limited at the time and where Goodridge lived, so she was essentially a self-taught artist.

== Career ==
Goodridge probably began her career in Boston working with her sister, but spent most of her life in the central part of Massachusetts. She lived in Templeton, Massachusetts, and made several extended trips to Worcester in the 1830s and 1840s, during which time she lived with and painted members of the Foster family.

The American Antiquarian Society's portrait collection contains the largest representation – 12 images – of Eliza Goodridge's known work. The Worcester Art Museum also houses several of Goodridge's miniatures.

Among Goodridge's better-known miniatures are Alice Goudry of Wilmington, Massachusetts in the Metropolitan Museum of Art; Stephen Salisbury III (1838), a watercolor on ivory, in the Worcester Art Museum; Sophia Dwight Foster Burnside (ca. 1830), in the American Antiquarian Society collection; Julia Porter Dwight (ca. 1832), a portrait of the grandniece of Yale president Timothy Dwight, in the Yale University Art Gallery, New Haven, Connecticut.

Goodridge's landscapes include View of Mount Holyoke, Massachusetts and the Connecticut River, ca. 1827, and View of Round Hill, Northampton, Massachusetts, 1824, in the Worcester Art Museum.

== Personal life ==
In 1849, at the age of fifty-one, Goodridge married Colonel Ephraim Stone, who owned a general store and sawmill in Templeton.
