= American Academy of the Fine Arts =

Former art school in New York City

Coordinates: 40.78367°N 73.95867°W

The American Academy of the Fine Arts was an art institution founded in 1802 in New York City, to encourage appreciation and teaching of the classical style. It exhibited copies of classical works and encouraged artists to emulate the classical in their work. Richard Varick, the mayor of New York, and Gulian Verplanck, a New York politician, were some of the academy's original organizers. Younger artists grew increasingly restive under its constraint, and in 1825 left to found the National Academy of Design.

== History ==
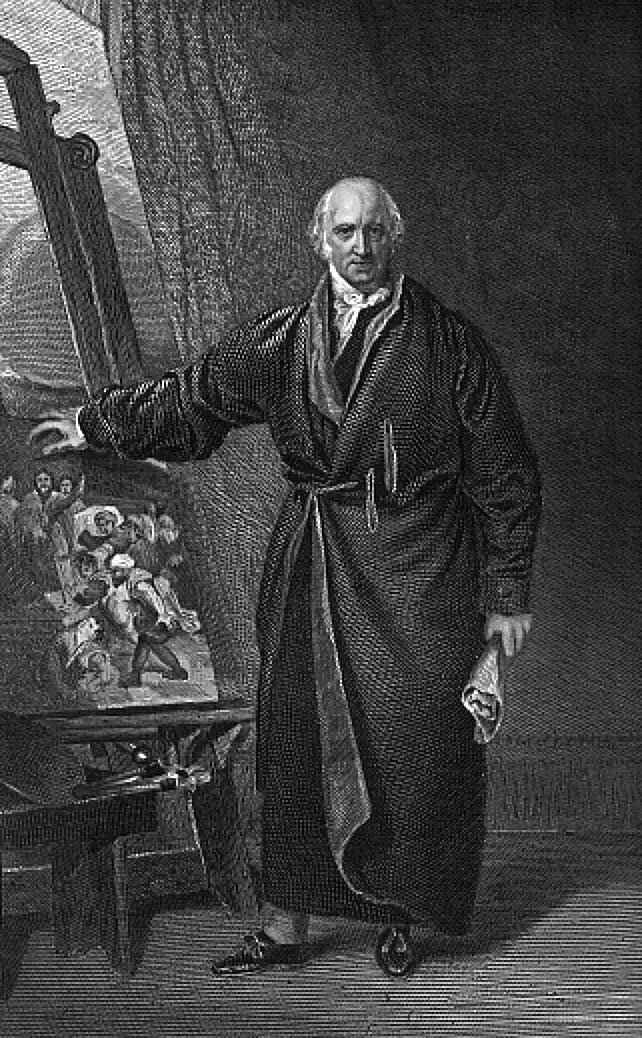
An 1877 portrait engraving of Benjamin West by Thomas Lawrence

The academy's original name was the New York Academy of the Fine Arts. Its founders included Richard Varick, a mayor of New York City, and Gulian C. Verplanck, a future influential politician in the state and nationally.

A conservative organization, the academy was led by John Trumbull, a painter, who served as its president from 1817 to 1836. He had long practiced the classical ideal of art. The academy's conservatism led younger painters to form a splinter group.

In 1825, they abandoned the American Academy to found the National Academy of Design, also in New York City. The American Academy said it regretted the loss of the young artists, but affirmed its traditions. Ultimately it did not attract enough students and support, and closed in 1841. The National Academy has continued as a vital institution.

=== The West commission ===
In 1818, Trumbull, representing the American Academy, commissioned a portrait of his former teacher and mentor, the painter Benjamin West, from Thomas Lawrence, widely considered to be the most accomplished English portraitist of the age. Lawrence set a price of 400 guineas for the project. According to Carrie Rebora's 20th-century account, to pay for the work, Trumbull opened a subscription fund before finally taking delivery of the painting in 1822 for the academy. Two earlier 19th-century accounts had said that Lawrence was made a member of the academy and painted the portrait in exchange.

== See also ==
- Pennsylvania Academy of the Fine Arts
- National Academy of Design
- Thomas Lawrence
- Samuel Morse
- John Trumbull
- Richard Varick
- Gulian C. Verplanck
- Benjamin West
