= Carrie Rebora Barratt =

American art historian

- Born: 1959-1960; Chicago, Illinois
- Occupations: Art historian, museum administrator
- Known for: American art history

Academic background
- Education: University of Illinois at Chicago (BA) University of California, Los Angeles (MA) CUNY Graduate Center (PhD)
- Thesis: The American Academy of the Fine Arts, New York, 1802–1842 (1990)

Academic work
- Discipline: Museums, arts, not-for-profit administration
- Sub-discipline: Public gardens, plant science, horticulture
- Institutions: The Metropolitan Museum of Art, The New York Botanical Garden

Carrie Rebora Barratt is an American art historian specializing in museum administration and collaborative nonprofit leadership. She has worked in this domain in New York City since the 1980s. Barratt was Curator of American Paintings and Sculpture (1989–2009), and Manager of the Henry R. Luce Center for the Study of American Art (1989–2009) and Deputy Director for Collections (2009–2018) at the Metropolitan Museum of Art. She served as the Chief Executive Officer and William C. Steere Sr. President of The New York Botanical Garden 2018-2020 during a transitional period. Prior to that, she spent over thirty years at the Metropolitan Museum of Art as a curator and administrator.

Barratt was born in Chicago and holds a BA in history of art and architecture from the University of Illinois at Chicago. She completed a master's degree in art history from the University of California, Los Angeles, and a PhD in art history from the Graduate Center of the City University of New York.

Barratt joined the Metropolitan Museum of Art in 1984 as a summer intern. In subsequent years, she received a Chester Dale Fellowship in 1987 and an Andrew W. Mellon Fellowship in 1988 to write her doctoral dissertation. Barratt was Curator of American Paintings and Sculpture (2001–2009), and Manager of the Henry R. Luce Center for the Study of American Art (1989–2009). In 2009 she was named Deputy Director for Collections and Administration at the Metropolitan Museum of Art, a position she held until 2018.

On July 1, 2018, Barratt became the CEO and President of The New York Botanical Garden, the ninth person and first woman to lead the organization in this role. On July 8, 2020, Barratt announced that she would step down from her position at the end of the summer of 2020.

In June 2026, the Nelson-Atkins Museum of Art appointed Barratt as its Senior Curator-at-Large for American Art.

== Selected publications ==
- Jasper Cropsey Watercolors: Catalogue and Essay, National Academy of Design (New York, New York), 1985.
- The Art of Henry Inman, National Portrait Gallery, Smithsonian Institution (Washington, DC), 1987.
- John Singleton Copley in America, Metropolitan Museum of Art (New York, New York), 1995.
- John Singleton Copley and Margaret Kemble Gage: Turkish Fashion in 18th-Century America, Putnam Foundation (San Diego, California), 1998.
- Queen Victoria and Thomas Sully, Princeton University Press (Princeton, New Jersey), 2000.
- Gilbert Stuart, Yale University Press (New Haven, Connecticut), 2004.
