= Jay Heritage Center =

Non-profit organization in New York, United States

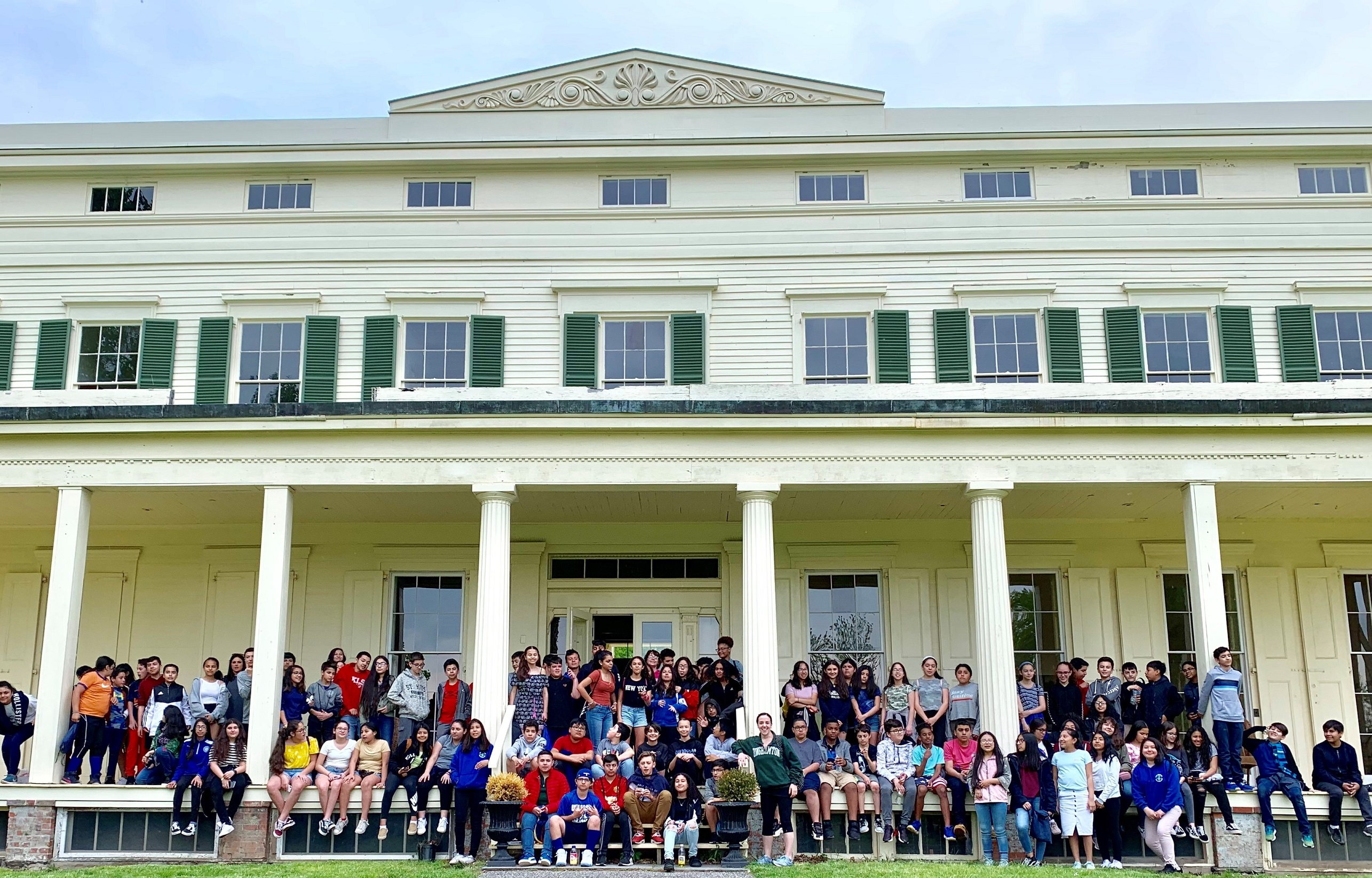
- School group at Jay Estate
- Established: 1990; 36 years ago
- Founders: Kitty Aresty, Catherine Crean, Karen Kennedy, Rhoda Kornreich, Helen "Dee Dee" Paschal and members of the Jay Coalition
- Headquarters: Jay Estate
- Website: www.jayheritagecenter.org

The Jay Heritage Center (JHC) is a 501(c)(3) not-for-profit organization incorporated in 1990 and chartered by the New York State Board of Regents to act as stewards of the 23-acre Jay Estate, the National Historic Landmark home of American Founding Father John Jay. Jay's ancestral property in Rye, New York is considered the centerpiece of the Boston Post Road Historic District.

== Mission ==
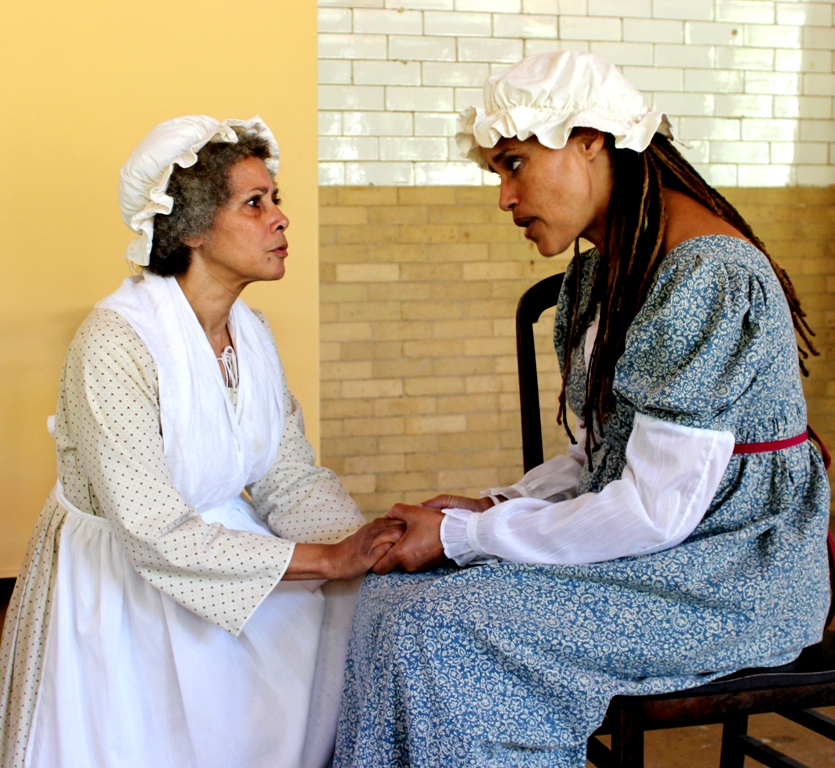
Striving for Freedom, an interactive play

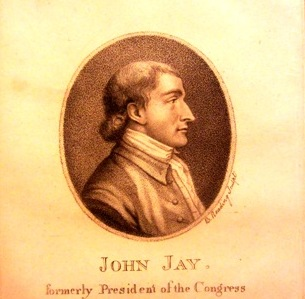
John Jay, by Pierre Eugene du Simitiere

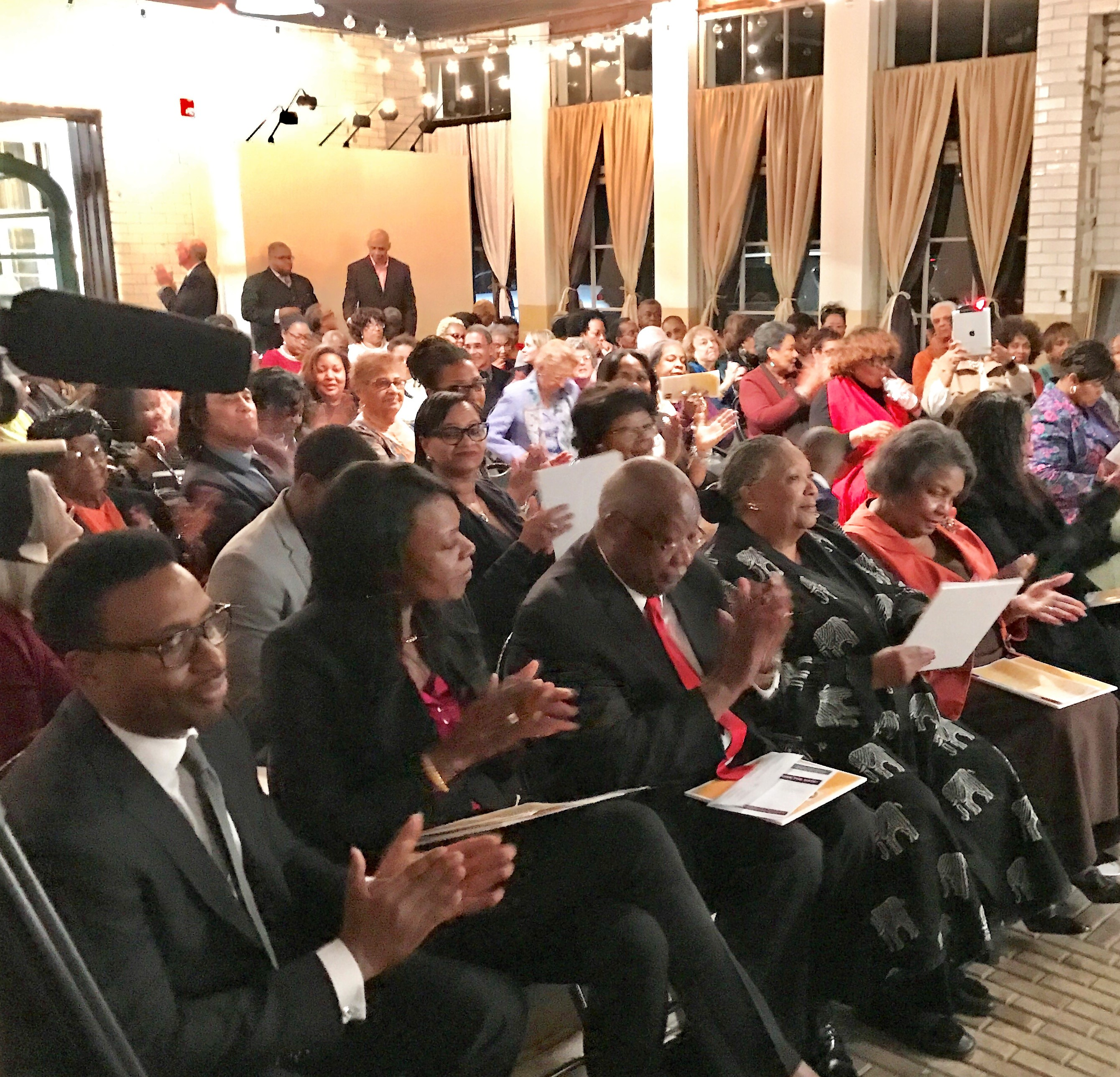
The Annual Trailblazers Awards Ceremony honors notable African American individuals in Westchester County at the Jay Estate which is on the African American Heritage Trail

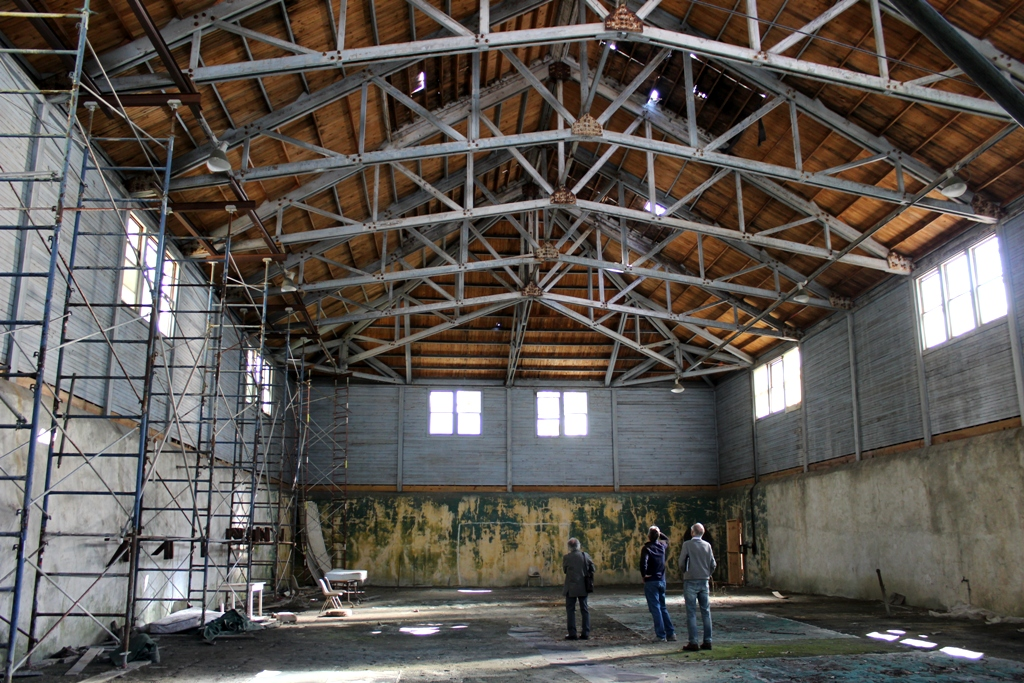
The Palmer Tennis House is the third oldest indoor tennis court in the United States

The Jay Heritage Center's mission is to educate the public about the legacy of American patriot, jurist, anti-slavery advocate and diplomat John Jay. Visitors, adults and children are guided through the historic preservation, restoration and interpretation of the land upon which he, and many others, including enslaved women and men, grew up in Rye, New York. JHC manages the remaining 23-acre (9.3 ha) core parcel of Jay's home as an active campus with indoor and outdoor classrooms filled with programs in American history, architecture, social justice, landscape conservation and environmental stewardship.

== History ==
The Jay Heritage Center was an outgrowth of the civic advocacy of several groups starting in 1979 that ultimately became the Jay Coalition in 1986. This group of community stakeholders, united by their dedication to protect John Jay's ancestral home as well as the neighboring Marshlands Conservancy and Long Island Sound in Rye from commercial development, attracted more than 62 historical and environmental organizations. Members of the Coalition included descendants of John Jay such as John Jay Iselin, and groups like the Sierra Club, the National Trust for Historic Preservation and others.

The coalition lobbied for support from local, state and federal politicians for more than 11 years. They attended numerous planning commission meetings, gathered signatures, drafted legislation and engaged in other grassroots activism. Finally, the core members of the endeavor formally incorporated as the non-profit Jay Heritage Center. The efforts of the Coalition received bipartisan support from numerous government officials. Among the critical players were New York Governor Mario Cuomo, Westchester County Executive Andrew P. O'Rourke, Suzi Oppenheimer, Richard Ottinger, and Joe DioGuardi.

Advocacy by the Jay Heritage Center also contributed to the preservation of the surrounding National Historic Landmark District. In 2005, J. Winthrop Aldrich, former assistant to six successive Commissioners of New York State Department of Environmental Conservation (1974–94) and Deputy Commissioner New York State Office of Parks, Recreation and Historic Preservation (1998–2003; 2007–10) attested that the non-profit's effort "to preserve, restore and interpret the properties has been a model for the nation."

Notable advisors to the non-profit have included the late Roger G. Kennedy, Director of the Smithsonian, preservationist James Marston Fitch and Elizabeth Barlow Rogers, who together with other architectural historians and preservations suggested a strategy for the organization. Charles A. Birnbaum of The Cultural Landscape Foundation has also been an active advisor to the organization.

In 2019, the Jay Heritage Center was invited to join the African-American History in Westchester Commemoration Committee to help plan events throughout the county to commemorate the 400th anniversary of the arrival of the first enslaved Africans to the English Colonies in North America in 1619.

== Stewardship of the Jay Estate ==
=== Private public partnership ===
In 2010, stakeholders and preservationists concerned about the potential closure of 55 New York State parks gathered at a public forum in Greenburgh, New York to suggest solutions to then Governor David Paterson. It was suggested that negotiating public-private partnerships with trusted non-profits might be an alternative to shuttering historic sites. This conveyance of responsibility turned out to be particularly suitable for the Jay Estate. The Jay Heritage Center was already one of the three owners of a parcel of public parkland that overlooks Long Island Sound. JHC owns 1.5 acres (0.61 ha) and the New York State Office of Parks, Recreation and Historic Preservation (NYSOPRHP) and Westchester County Parks share interest in the remaining 21.5 acres (8.7 ha) (with NYSOPRHP owning 90% and Westchester County Parks owning 10%).

The agreement received unanimous and bipartisan support from the Westchester County Board of Legislators in November 2012. Officials saw the agreement as a means towards preserving the site's future with trusted curators but also acknowledged that the covenant was a means towards removing all taxpayer costs for maintenance of the property. In August 2013, under Governor Andrew Cuomo JHC was finally awarded management of the Jay Estate by NYSOPRHP and Westchester County Executive Rob Astorino through a public-private partnership agreement. The agreement was renewed in 2023.

NY State Parks Commissioner Rose Harvey commented on the agreement in a lecture titled Stewardship of New York's Cultural and Natural History on April 29, 2014. The Commissioner articulated the importance of saving the site: "Here we are at the boyhood home of the only native founding father and the first Chief Justice of the United States, author of New York's constitution and two time governor, abolitionist and patriarch of several generations of similarly public minded descendants. It is a reminder of how many leaders called New York home and it is a source of state pride that we have preserved this home."

=== Landscape ===
JHC is entrusted to stabilize and rehabilitate culturally significant landscape features at the Jay Estate including 1822 stone ha-ha walls, 1.5 acres (0.61 ha) of historic sunken gardens that date back to the 1700s, a meadow, an apple orchard, and elm tree allée. JHC was awarded a $500,000 Regional Economic Development Council (REDC) grant in December 2014 to help restore the historic Jay Gardens.

=== Buildings owned by the Jay Heritage Center ===
JHC owns two of the buildings outright and receives no annual governmental funding for them. The two structures are the 1838 Peter Augustus Jay House and a 1907 carriage house. The carriage house was designed by the architect Frank A. Rooke who designed Claremont Stables and several Sheffield Farms dairy plants in Manhattan. Commissioned by the later residents Warner and Grace Talcott Van Norden, the Classical Revival, yellow folly has its original, four-faced Seth Thomas clock and three pairs of mahogany pocket doors. In 2022, it was renamed the Sue and Edgar Wachenheim III Exhibit and Performance Center following a transformative gift of $1.5 million.

=== Buildings managed by Jay Heritage Center ===
The 1907 Zebra House, Jay Ice House, Palmer Pump House, 1917 Indoor Tennis House, and an 18th-century farmhouse – belong jointly to New York State Parks and Westchester County Parks but are being managed and restored by JHC with fund raised by JHC.

On August 4, 2015 Governor Andrew Cuomo announced more than $6.2 million in grant awards to help 16 historically significant properties repair severe damage from Superstorm Sandy in 2012; JHC was one of those organizations and awarded $391,056 for stabilization and restoration of the 1917 Palmer Tennis House which is also in its care. "The Palmer Tennis House, the third oldest indoor tennis court in the United States, experienced roof damage during Hurricane Sandy. The Jay Heritage Center will stabilize and restore the wood truss system and copper trimmed skylights, as well as the stone foundation and clapboard siding. Improvements to the tennis house, constructed circa 1917, will facilitate historic usage and interpretation."

In 2019, JHC received a prestigious $50,000 grant from the Gerry Charitable Trust to rehabilitate the site of an 1849 Alexander Jackson Davis building and create a garden pavilion for educational purposes.

== Programs and events ==
Today, JHC hosts educational programs in American history, African American History, Social Justice, Environmental Stewardship, Historic Preservation and more. Popular school and family programs have included hands-on archaeology digs and architecture mini-camps. JHC was also named to New York State's Path Through History in 2014 for its programs that explore themes of Civil Rights as reflected in the legacy of the Jay family.

Through collaborative partnerships, JHC is a host/co-sponsor of the following annual programs and events: Martin Luther King Jr. Literary Celebration (January), Annual African American Trailblazers Awards Ceremony (February), I Love My Park Day (May) and Hudson River Valley Ramble (September).

=== American history, social justice, African American history ===
JHC's signature school program, Striving For Freedom, is a site-specific, interactive play based on historic records which engages middle and high school students in a discussion of Jay's complicated role in the abolition of slavery in New York State. The program is provided free thanks to a long time grant from Con Edison; free bus transportation is provided as well for qualifying schools. The play has been performed for over 15 years and the average size class that attends is 100 students.

=== Environmental stewardship ===
Our Footprints Matter is an ongoing program which highlights the energy efficient measures employed by JHC.

JHC regularly holds programs and workshops to educate the community about Invasive Species identification and management. Working with fellow parks, historic sites and Audubon chapters, JHC has been a longtime partner of NY State's Lower Hudson Partnership for Invasive Species Management (LHPRISM). JHC has advocated for the removal of invasive species from public parks since 2007.

== Exhibits ==
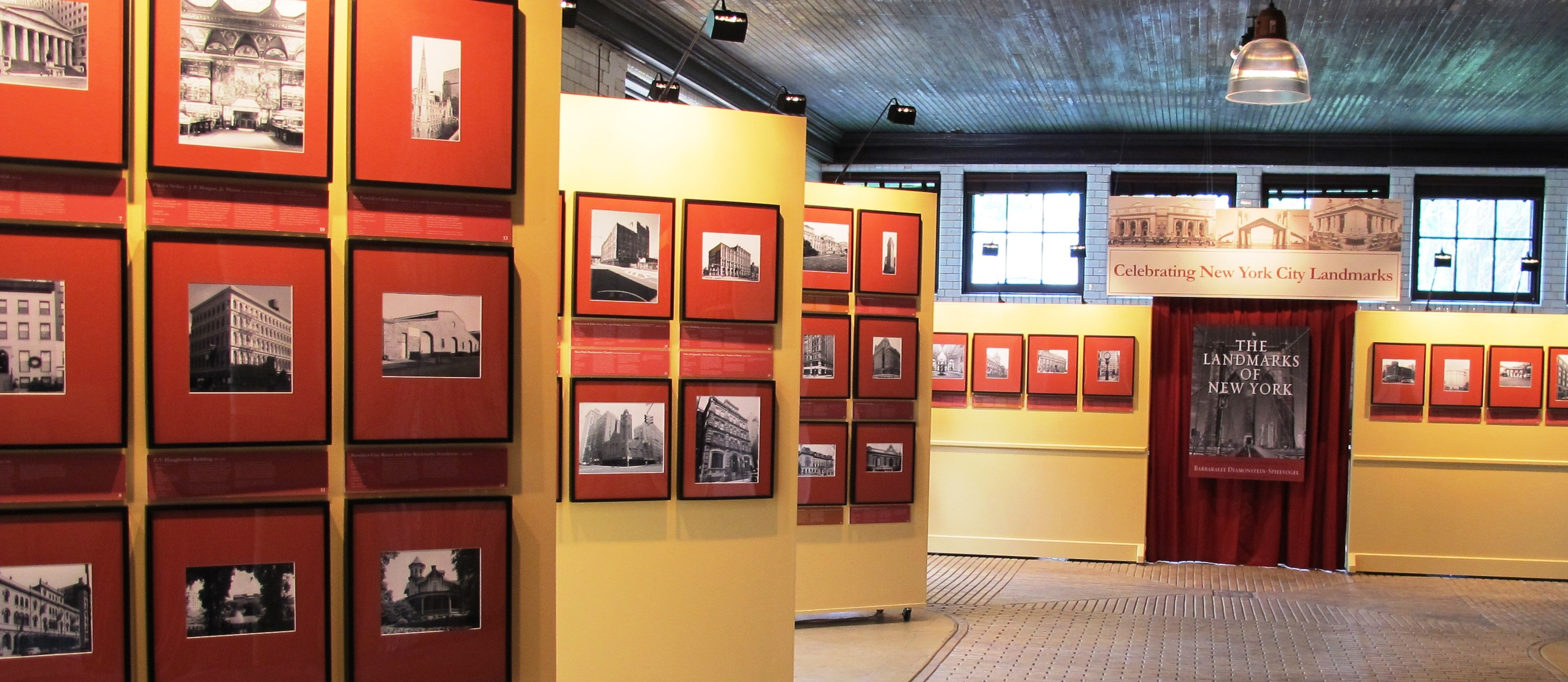
"The Landmarks of New York"

JHC's most recent exhibit is Preserving Westchester's African-American Heritage: Engaging Youth & Community. Past exhibits have included A Legacy of Sailing – Residents of the Jay Estate and Yachting New York 1843–1966, which coincided with New York State's Hudson-Fulton-Champlain Quadricentennial celebration and was co-sponsored by Mystic Seaport; The Jays and The Abolition Of Slavery: From Manumission to Emancipation co-sponsored by the New-York Historical Society; and The Landmarks of New York a major exhibit of over 100 black and white photographs of iconic structures saved through preservation advocacy. The exhibit Mary Rutherfurd Jay – Garden Architect (1872–1953) illustrated the life and career of one of America's earliest landscape architects and proponents of professional education for women.

== Notable speakers ==
Notable programs for adults at the site have featured New York historian Russell Shorto, African American Heritage historian Dr. Larry Spruill, Lincoln historian Harold Holzer, American essayist Adam Gopnik, constitutional scholar Akhil Reed Amar, Pulitzer Prize-winning authors Ron Chernow, Annette Gordon-Reed, Joseph Ellis and Alan Taylor, historians Joanne B. Freeman, Barry Lewis and Peter S. Onuf, American author and activist Hugh Bernard Price, landscape preservationists Elizabeth Barlow Rogers and Lynden B. Miller, jurists Jonathan Lippman and Janet DiFiore. Children's programs have welcomed illustrator Barry Blitt, historian Jonah Winter, pop-up engineer Robert Sabuda and artist Herve Tullet.

The Jay Heritage Center hosted a conference in September 2013 titled Populism and Constitutionalism in concert with Wolfson College, Oxford that attracted notable legal scholars from around the world.

== John Jay Medal for Service ==
In 2012, JHC created "The John Jay Medal For Service" "to recognize individuals who demonstrate a selfless spirit of commitment and engagement with their community." JHC Founder Catherine "Kitty" Aresty and New York preservation advocate Barbaralee Diamonstein-Spielvogel were the first recipients of the Medal awarded by Congresswoman Nita Lowey. 2016 Honorees were Joseph Ellis, author of Founding Brothers and environmental lawyer Nicholas A. Robinson.

== Honors ==
Members of the JHC Board, and the organization itself, have been honored for their service in building awareness about the historical and cultural significance of John Jay's legacy and home in Rye by a number of organizations and government officials including the Garden Club of America, African American Men of Westchester, Parks & Trails New York, American Bar Association and NY State Senator Shelley Mayer.

JHC was honored with a NY State Historic Preservation Award for Non-Profit Achievement in December 2022 by Governor Kathy Hochul and NY State Parks Commissioner Erik Kullesid.
