= Jay Estate =

- The Jay Estate
- U.S. Historic district – Contributing property
- U.S. National Historic Landmark District – Contributing property
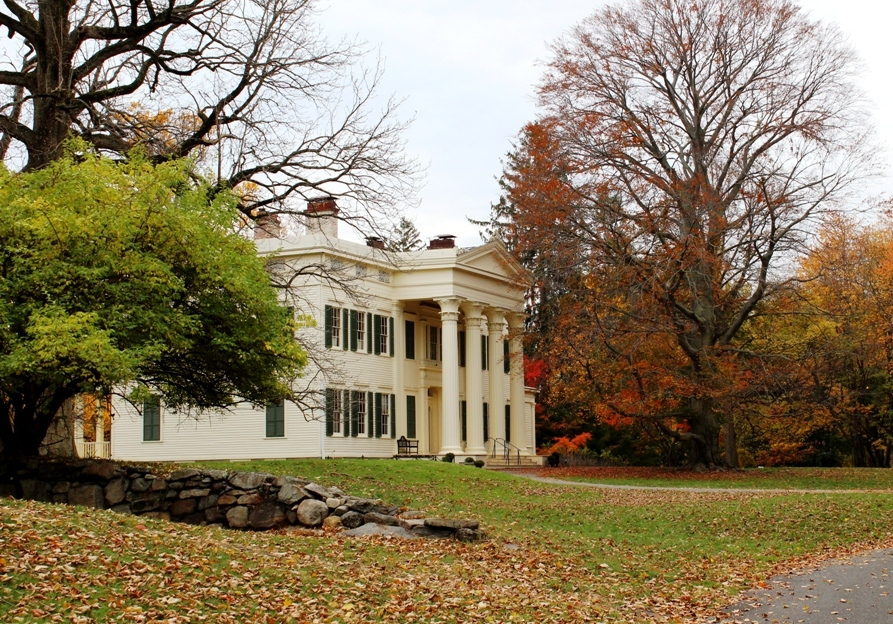
- The Jay Estate in Rye, NY
- Location: 210 Boston Post Road, Rye, New York
- Coordinates: 40°57′26″N 73°42′22″W
- Area: 23 acres with 3 owners: NY State Parks, Westchester County Parks and the Jay Heritage Center
- Built: 1745; 1838; 1907
- Built by: Edwin Bishop with influences by Minard Lafever, Asher Benjamin and Chester Hills; Frank A. Rooke
- Architectural style: Greek Revival; Classical Revival
- Restored by: Jay Heritage Center
- Website: www.jayheritagecenter.org
- Part of: Boston Post Road Historic District (Rye, New York) (ID82001275)

Significant dates
- Added to NRHP: October 29, 1982
- Designated NHLDCP: August 30, 1993

The Jay Estate is a 23-acre park and historic site in Rye, New York, with the 1838 Peter Augustus Jay House at its center. It is the keystone of the Boston Post Road Historic District, a National Historic Landmark District (NHLD) created in 1993. The site is one of two surviving remnants of the 400-acre (1.6 km^{2}) farm where US Founding Father, John Jay (December 12, 1745 – May 17, 1829), grew up, the other intact parcel being the Marshlands Conservancy. It is also the place where Jay returned to celebrate the end of the American Revolutionary War, after he negotiated the 1783 Treaty of Paris with fellow peacemakers John Adams and Benjamin Franklin. The preserved property is located on the south side of the Boston Post Road (US 1) and has a 3/4-mile (1.2 km) view of Milton Harbor.

The Jay Estate is a recognized historical resource. It is part of a 10,000+ year old Indigenous peoples archaeological site and overlooks the oldest man-managed meadow on record in New York State. It is a significant African American Heritage Trail site. The Jay Estate is also one of a select few national landmarks devoted to education about the country's early nation-builders including Washington's Mount Vernon, Jefferson's Monticello, Hamilton's The Grange, Madison's Montpelier and Jay's retirement home the John Jay Homestead.

== Ownership and stewardship ==
The Jay Estate has 3 discrete owners:New York State Parks, Westchester County and the Jay Heritage Center. New York State Parks (90%) and Westchester County (10%) own a 21.5 acre parcel known as the "Jay Property" as tenants in common while the non-profit Jay Heritage Center (JHC) owns 1.5 acres outright including the Jay Mansion and the 1907 Van Norden Carriage House. A 2013 public-private partnership and agreement awarded stewardship of the State and County's 21.5 acres, including preservation, restoration and interpretation to the Jay Heritage Center (JHC). Under the operating agreement, JHC receives no funds from New York State, Westchester County or the City of Rye. All monies for improvements are raised through individual donations, corporate gifts and grants. Because of the significance of the site, all preservation work is done with adherence to the standards of the Department of the Interior. The agreement was unanimously renewed in 2023.

The Jay Estate is located adjacent to the Marshlands Conservancy, a completely separate nature preserve owned and operated 100% by Westchester County Parks.

== History ==
=== Indigenous peoples settlement site ===
As a component of the Boston Post Road Historic District, the Jay Estate has been further recognized as an archaeologically significant area. There are known affiliations with Middle Woodland, Late Woodland, Late Archaic and periods of historic significance of 3000-4999 BC, 1000-2999 BC, 1499-1000 AD, 1749-1500 AD, 1825-1849, and 1850-1874.

=== Childhood Home of John Jay ===
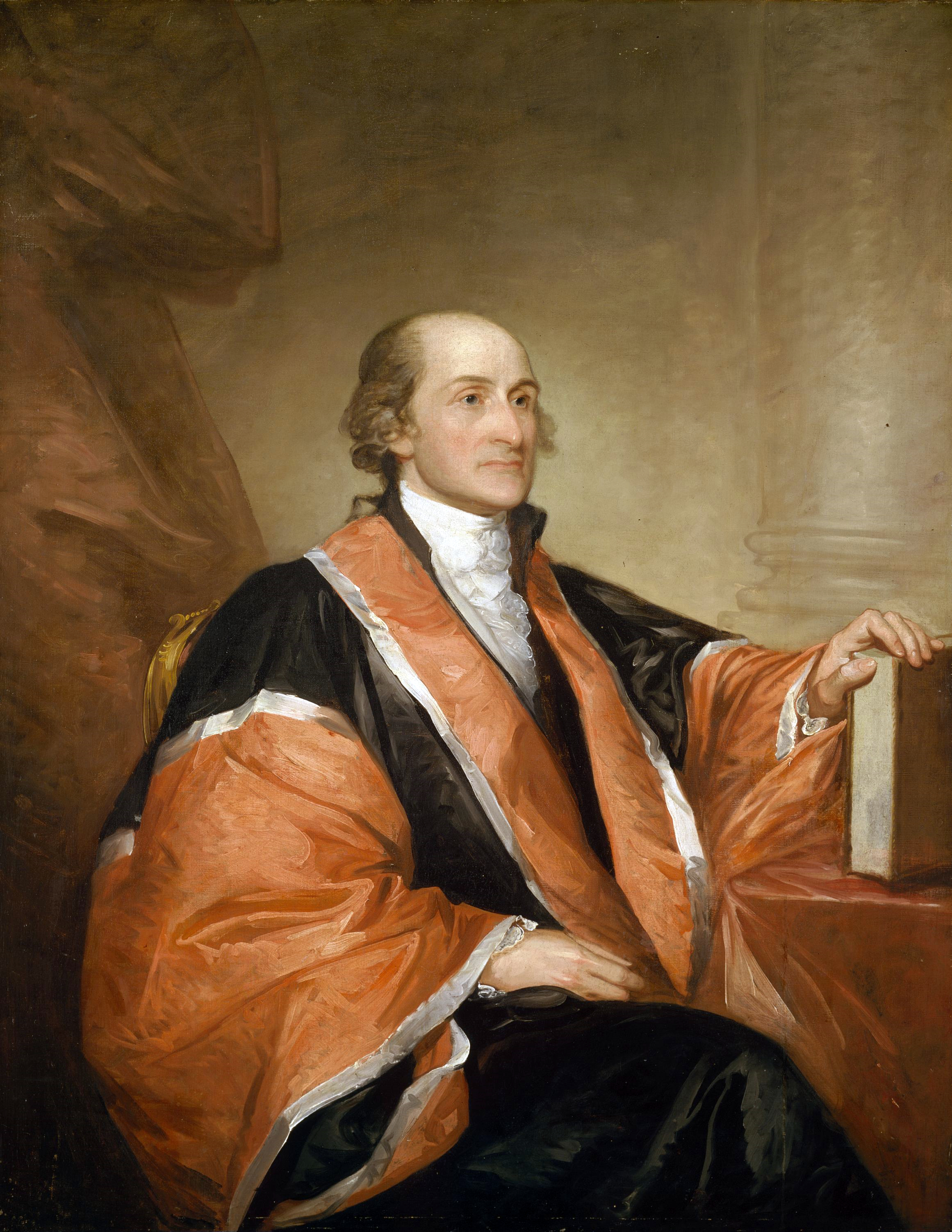
Portrait of John Jay by Gilbert Stuart, 1794

Of America's seven most notable Founding Fathers - George Washington, John Adams, Jay, Benjamin Franklin, Alexander Hamilton, Thomas Jefferson and James Madison - Jay alone was born in what would become the settler-colonial territory of New York State. He was raised in Rye from 3 months at what he called the "Family Seat" a 400-acre (160 ha) farm later named "The Locusts" overlooking Long Island Sound. The property had been first leased then purchased by his father Peter from Rye settler John Budd before Jay's birth.

Jay was home schooled by his mother Mary until 8 years old. He had three siblings with disabilities who lived there as well - Augustus who suffered from learning disabilities and Anna and Peter who were both blind. Two other siblings, an older sister Eve and a younger brother Frederick also occupied the house. The estate at this time was also home to 8 enslaved people according to a 1755 New York State Census; remnants of what appears to have been an enslaved person's dwelling were discovered in August 2017. Based on archival drawings, the core property at that time had several smaller outbuildings including an ice house, stable, smokehouse and additional dwellings clustered around the main house including a still extant farmhouse that dates to the mid 1760s. Numerous wells provided water on the property along with two other freshwater sources known as the East Stream and West Creek. Crops included potatoes.

At 14 years old, Jay went to New York City to study law at Kings College (today's Columbia University) but continued to come home fortnightly to spend time and holidays with family. Exchanges with his father reveal the names of enslaved persons living at the site including Moll, Old Plato, Little Plat, Old Mary, Young Mary, Zilpha, Clarinda and Anthony.

=== Family Seat ===
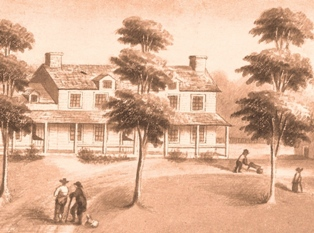
Ancestral home of John Jay in Rye, New York

When the Stamp Act compelled Jay and many other lawyers to strike in defiance of British law, he returned there to live from 1765 to 1766, and immersed himself in re-reading the classics. After negotiating the Treaty of Paris that ended the Revolutionary War, Jay rejoiced with family and friends at his home in Rye in July, 1784. While Governor of New York, Jay notes "I am the owner of one undivided half part of a lot of land containing by estimation seventy acres, in the township of Rye adjacent to the farm of Peter Jay and occupied by him." – John Jay, October 1, 1798. John Jay and members of his family spent time there including his wife Sarah Livingston Jay and his youngest son William. After Jay's retirement to Bedford, he inherited his brother's portion of the estate and oversaw management of the property from 1813 to 1822 before transferring it to his eldest son Peter Augustus in 1822. Still he advised on the planting of numerous trees.

During this period, the landscape began to change. Dry-laid stone ha-ha walls replaced fences and the view to the Long Island Sound was more formally shaped. Three large elm trees were planted behind the main house to replace three locusts that had fallen during the September Gale of 1821. The last enslaved resident of the property, a man named Caesar Valentine, was freed in 1824 and remained at the Jay Estate in the employ of the Jay family until his death and burial on the farm in 1847.

Famous visitors to the Jay Estate during this period include Yale President Timothy Dwight IV, American novelist James Fenimore Cooper, artist and inventor Samuel F. B. Morse.

=== The 1838 Jay Mansion (also known as the Peter Augustus Jay House) ===
In 1836, seven years after his father's death, Peter reluctantly took down the ancestral house voluntarily. He reincorporated its timbers, doors, shutters and nails into a new 1838 structure, locating the second construction on the footprint of the first building. Stylistic elements appear to have been influenced by architectural pattern books by Minard Lafever, Asher Benjamin and Chester Hills. While the style of the mansion's facade is grand, the rear piazza replicates the simplicity and same dimensions of the first house, one story high and 80 feet (24 m) long.

Portrait of Peter Augustus Jay, lawyer and anti-slavery advocate, by John Wesley Jarvis

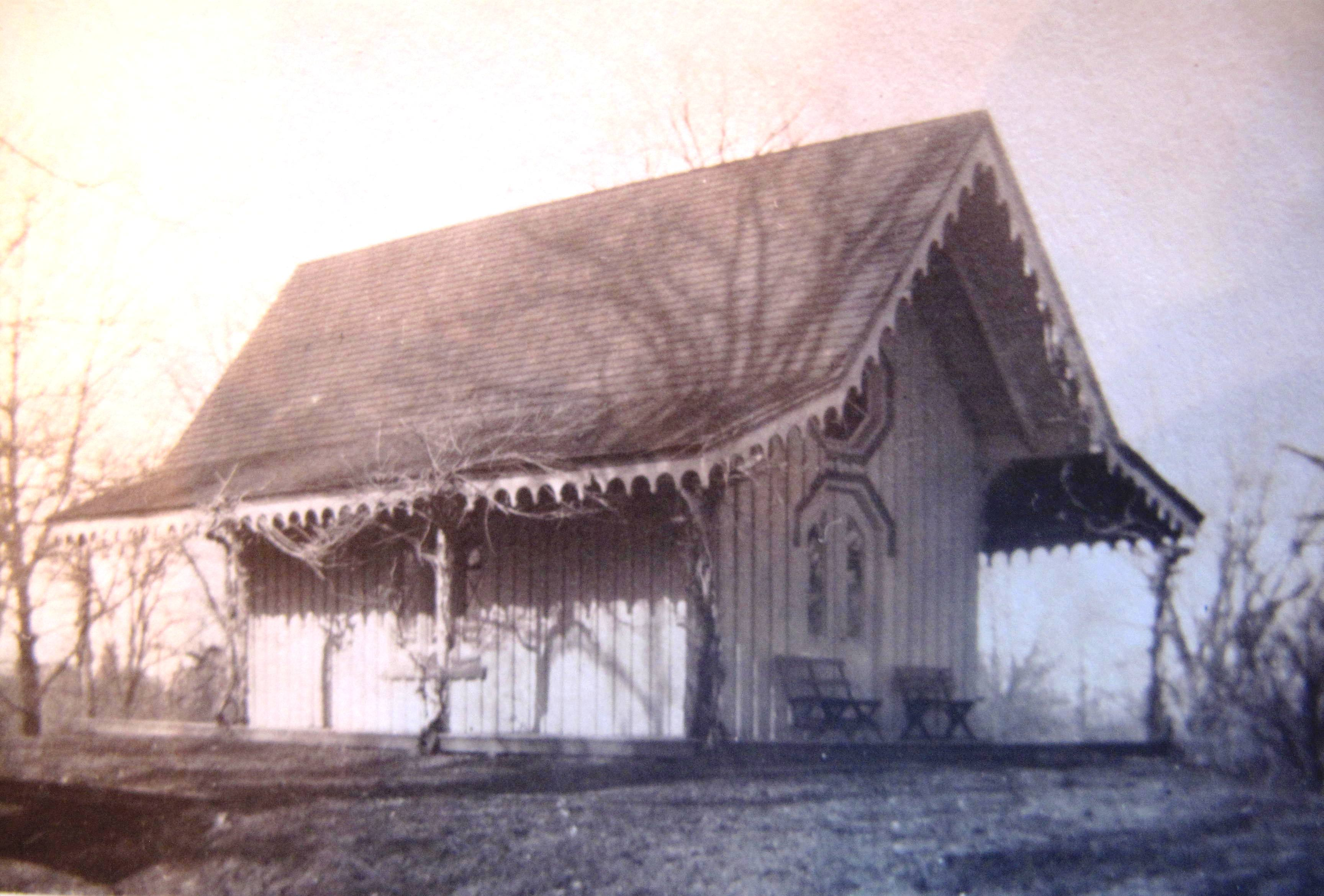
1849 Alexander Jackson Davis Cottage at Jay Estate (Jay Heritage Center Archives)

=== Alansten ===
After Peter Augustus Jay's death in 1843, the Jay Estate passed down to his son John Clarkson Jay a noted conchologist, member of the Lyceum of Natural History doctor and co-founder of New York Yacht Club. Dr. Jay made changes to the mansion which included rerouting the central hall staircase. In 1849, he added a Carpenter Gothic cottage based upon designs by Alexander Jackson Davis as well as a bowling alley. He also gave the property the new name of "Alansten." Portions of the property were leased by gardeners and farmers who managed the surrounding land for the Jay family as a dairy farm. The property was kept open for livestock and planted with crops of rye, wheat and corn.

The home and surrounding acreage stayed in the Jay family through 1904. Other notable owners and residents of the property during this period include landscape architect Mary Rutherfurd Jay, her brother Pierre Jay, first Chairman of the Federal Reserve Bank of New York, and art collector and philanthropist Junius Spencer Morgan II.

=== 20th Century Owners ===
Owners of the Jay Estate in modern times included architect Henry Ives Cobb (1904) who purchased the land with hopes to develop it; Dutch financier Warner M. Van Norden and Grace Talcott (1905-1911) who kept rare animals including Highland cattle and Grévy's zebras; Princeton benefactor and Palmer Square creator Edgar Palmer and his wife Zilph (1911-1935); National Horse Show President Walter B. Devereux and his wife Zilph (1935-1966); the Methodist Church (1966-1979); and lastly DGM Partners, a real estate concern formed by Diane Millstein, wife of philanthropist Ira Millstein (1979-1992).

It is during this period (circa 1917) that a large Indoor Tennis House is constructed. Landscape architects Brinley & Holbrook redesign the gardens.

=== Threat of Development (1979 - 1992) ===
The Jay Estate was threatened by development in 1979. The conflict that arose galvanized the advocacy efforts of more than 62 historical and environmental organizations known as the "Jay Coalition" (the precursor to today's Jay Heritage Center) together with numerous government officials. Supreme Court Justice Harry A. Blackmun was a visitor to the site during this time.

During this chapter of change, and upon seeing the preserved landscape and viewshed of John Jay's youth and early adulthood, Justice Harry Blackmun remarked,

It was a place that struck me then as symbolic of what was impressive about certain aspects of the latter part of the 18th century—gracious living and status to be sure, but coupled with a sense of responsibility, particularly to government and to the art of getting along together.

— Harry Blackmun, Associate Justice, United States Supreme Court

It is also during this window that the surrounding Boston Post Road Historic District was added to the National Historic Register of Places (1982).

In 1992, after 13 years of negotiations and public hearings, Westchester County purchased the 23 acre property for $11.5 million and the Jay Estate was preserved. Two buildings and 1.5 acres in the center of that parcel were sold to the Jay Heritage Center.

=== Preservation and Interpretation (1993 - Today) ===
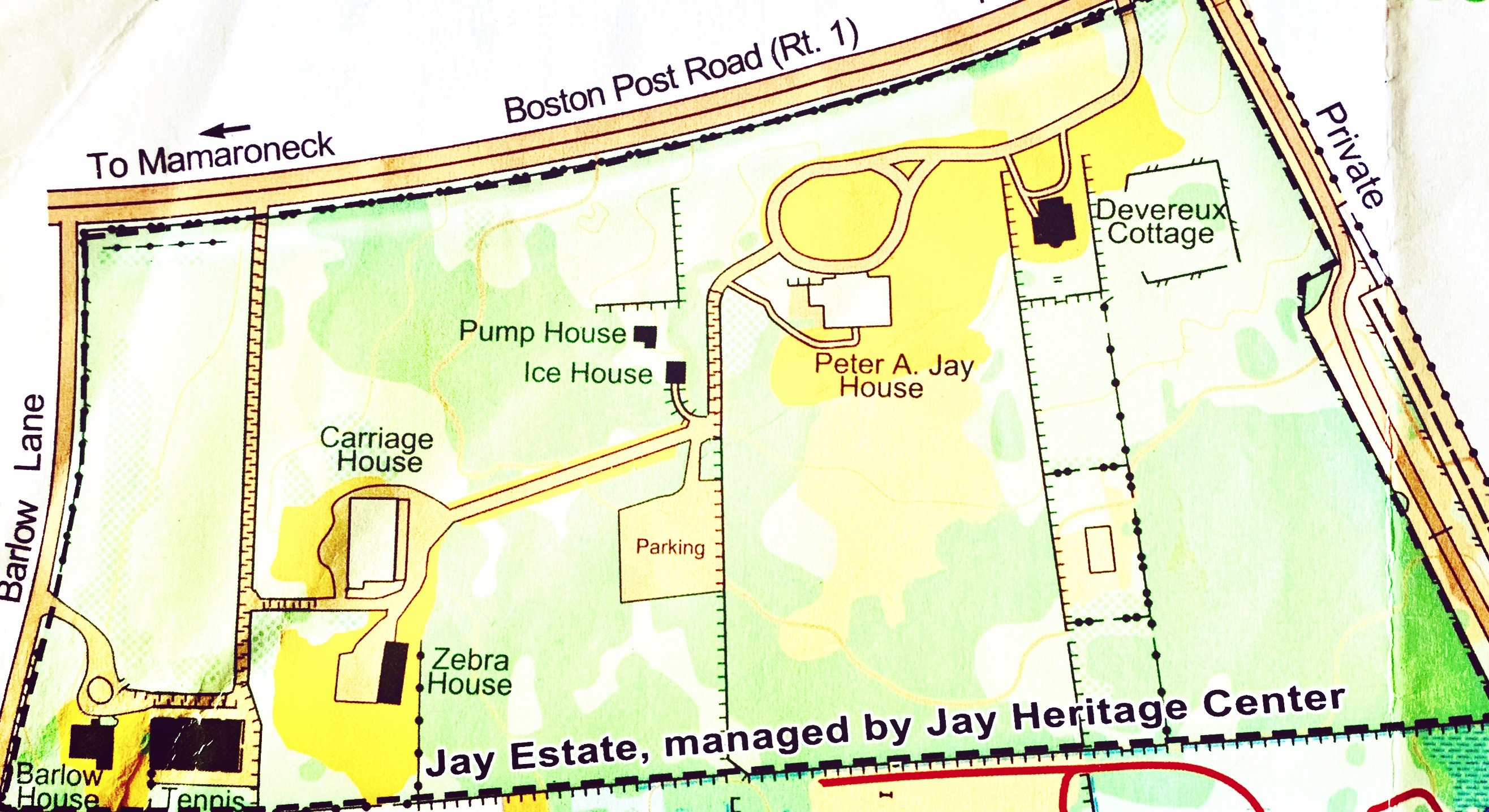
23-acre Jay Estate map

In 1993, the Jay Estate and surrounding properties were further elevated in stature and included in a National Historic Landmark District by the National Park Service. In keeping with this distinction, preservation of the Jay Estate adheres to standards set by the Department of the Interior. In 1997, New York State Parks purchased a 90% interest in the remaining 21.5 acres to become tenants in common with Westchester County.

Despite best efforts to maintain the property, the landscape fell into disrepair. By 2011, the integrity of the property was again in jeopardy. Charles A. Birnbaum of The Cultural Landscape Foundation declared the Jay Estate an at-risk landscape. To help build consensus for ways to move constructively forward, Birnbaum and Jay Heritage Center co-sponsored a day-long symposium called "Bridging the Nature Culture Divide." Landscape design professionals and members of the community were invited to reimagine how components of the landmark like its historic gardens and meadow could be reimagined in a sustainable manner. The event was so successful that it was repeated at other national sites. Subsequent forums were co-sponsored by the Central Park Conservancy (2012) and the Presidio Trust (2015).

In 2013, the non-profit Jay Heritage Center was awarded stewardship of the park under a private-public partnership agreement following legislative approval by Westchester County in 2012. The agreement was unanimously renewed in 2023.

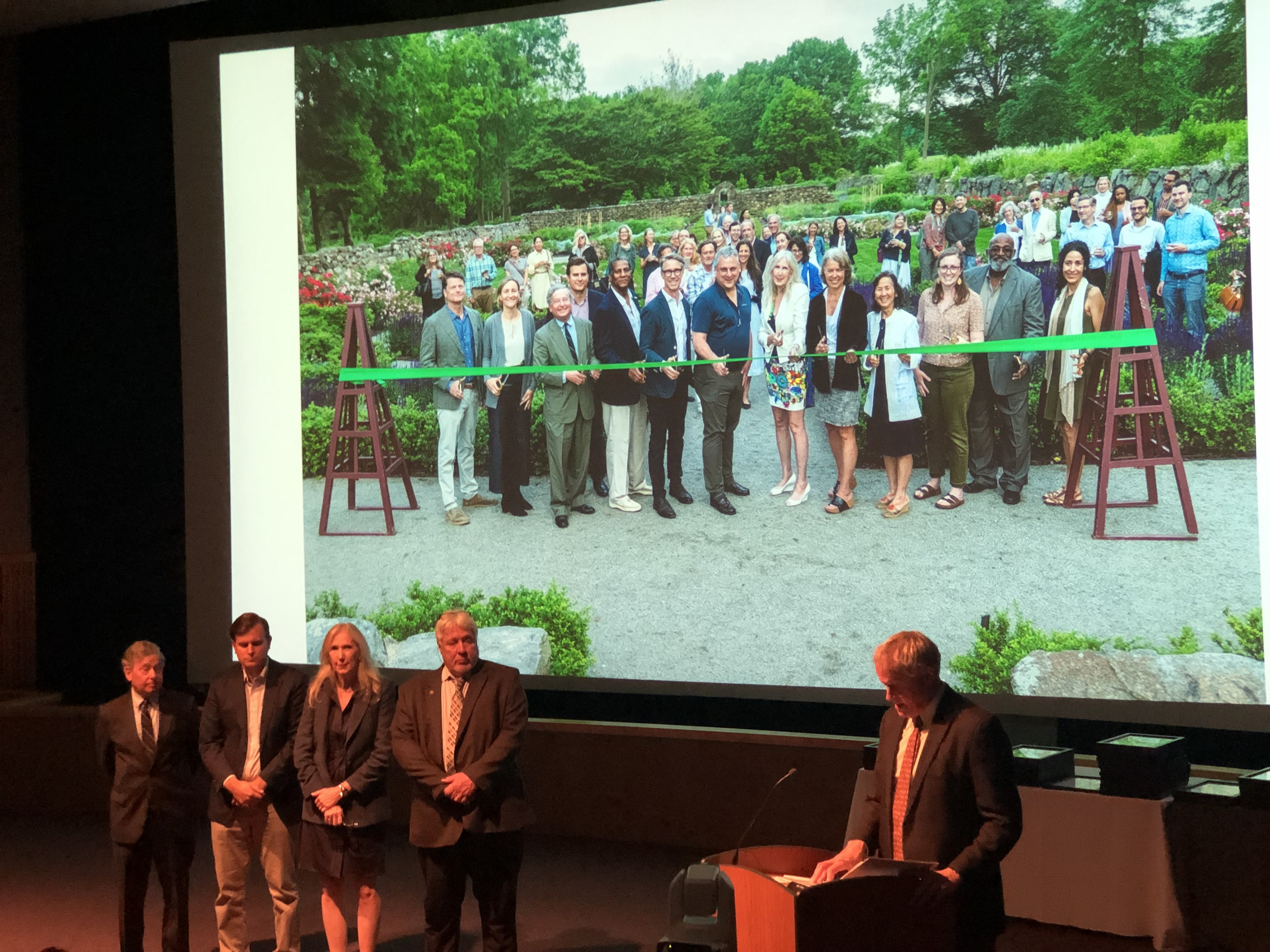
JHC Team Receives 2022 NY State Historic Preservation Award from NY State Parks Commissioner Erik Kullesid

Today the 3 owners of the park - NY State Parks, Westchester County and the Jay Heritage Center (JHC) collaborate to ensure the national treasure can be enjoyed by future generations. The partnership has been so successful that JHC was honored with a NY State Historic Preservation Award for Non-Profit Achievement in December 2022 by Governor Kathy Hochul and NY State Parks Commissioner Erik Kullesid.

== Components ==
Plaster Ceiling Medallion in the Drawing Room of the Jay Mansion

1838 Jay Mansion

(Owned by JHC)

Pieces of the original 18th century house "The Locusts" found within the mansion are also on public view and illustrate sustainable building traditions. JHC uses the house to host programs in American history, architecture, landscape conservation and environmental stewardship. Architects involved in the restoration process include Beyer Blinder Belle. One of the most significant additions included installation of a geothermal heating and cooling system. The building is an official Save America's Treasures project and was one of 63 recipients of the prestigious federal grant in 2001.

1907 Carriage House/Sue and Edgar Wachenheim III Exhibit and Performance Center

(Owned by JHC)

The carriage house was designed by architect Frank A. Rooke. It has been used for lectures, programs and concerts. It boasts its original working 1907 Seth Thomas tower clock. The building was renamed the Sue and Edgar Wachenheim III Exhibit and Performance Center Architects following a transformative gift of $1.5 million. Architects involved in the restoration process include Beyer Blinder Belle.

Meadow

(Owned by JHC, NYSOPRHP and Westchester County; maintained and operated by JHC)

Larry Weaner Landscape Architects were selected to rehabilitate a two-acre area full of invasive species and replant the space with native grasses and wildflowers. The goal is to attract more meadow and grassland birds which are in decline.

Historic Jay Gardens

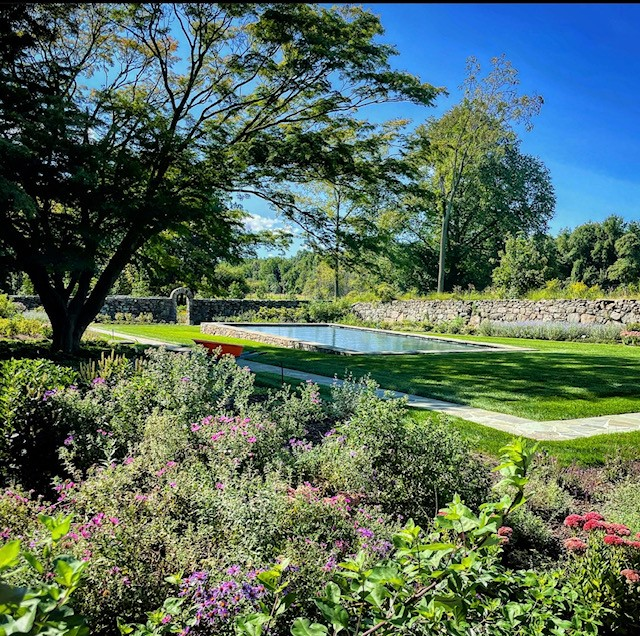
Historic Jay Gardens - Sensory Room and Reflecting Pool

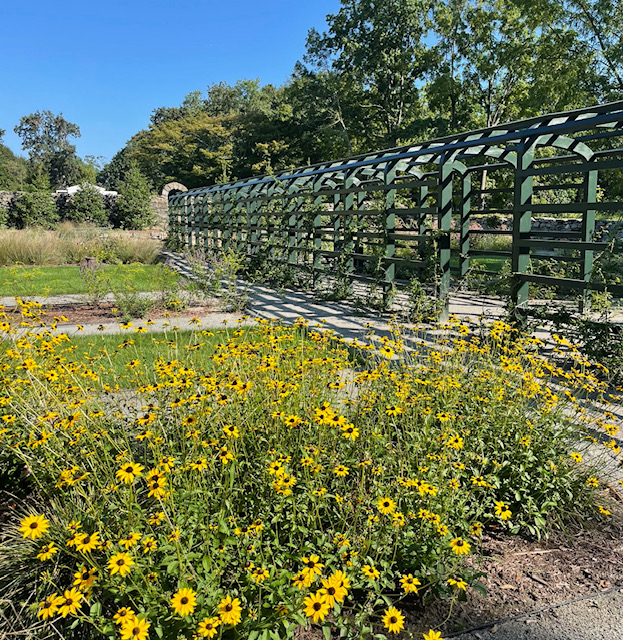
Historic Jay Gardens - Rose Arbor and Native Pollinator Room

(Owned by NYSOPRHP and Westchester County; maintained and operated by JHC)

The original estate gardens had wooden pales that were later replaced by stone fences. Sections of the dry laid stone walls that frame the spaces date from the late 1700s, 1822 and later. The gardens evolved and were even opened on occasion to the public in the 20th century.

Today they are open to the public again. The firm of Nelson Byrd Woltz Landscape Architects was selected to draw plans to restore and rehabilitate the gardens. Work was funded through more than $1,000,000 in donations raised by the Jay Heritage Center and a matching grant $500,000 REDC grant from New York State Parks

1917 Tennis House

(Owned by NYSOPRHP and Westchester County; maintained and operated by JHC)

The "covered" Tennis House is believed to be one of the oldest indoor courts in the country. It is being restored for eventual use by youth groups. The structure was neglected for many years and further damaged during Hurricane Sandy. It is currently undergoing stabilization.

1907 Zebra House

(Owned by NYSOPRHP and Westchester County; maintained and operated by JHC)

== Historic and natural designations ==
=== African American Heritage Trail (2004) ===
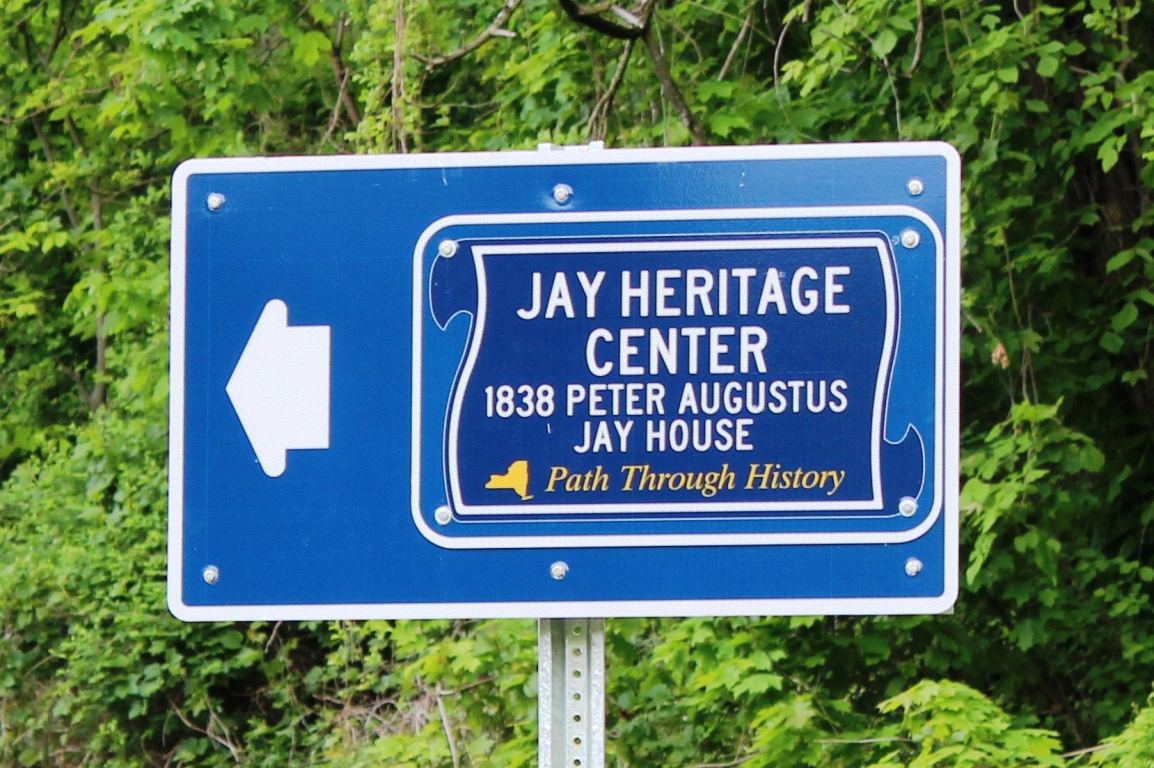
Path Through History designation 2014

The site is known to have been the home and burial site of numerous men and women owned and freed by the Jay family. As such, the estate was designated one of 16 sites on the African American Heritage Trail of Westchester County in 2004. John Jay is well known for a contradictory legacy of owning enslaved individuals while simultaneously advocating emancipation, serving as the first President of the New-York Manumission Society, and establishing the first African Free School. His son Peter Augustus Jay also served as President of the Manumission Society, continuing his work.

=== Hudson River Valley National Heritage Area (2009) ===
In November 2008, the PAJ House became the oldest National Historic Landmark structure in New York State to be equipped with an energy-efficient geothermal heating and cooling system. One year later, the 23-acre Jay Estate was designated a member site of the Hudson River Valley National Heritage Area (HRVNHA) in January 2009, based on its architectural and historic significance as well as green management practices and design efforts in sustainability. The HRVNHA is a prestigious designation by the National Park Service (NPS).

The Jay mansion has been recognized by some historians as an outstandingly pure example of Greek Revival architecture.

The [1838] Peter Jay House ... is undeniably a major architectural landmark. This monumental Greek Revival style house has been generally recognized as one of the most important buildings of its type in the country. Its symmetrical massing, bold scale, and grandly austere detail are an extraordinary symbol of the increasing wealth and power of America during the decade of the 1830s. The house also reflects the importance of the Jay family in a maturing nation.

— Andrew Dolkart, architectural historian

=== NY Path Through History (2013) ===
In 2013, the Jay Estate was added to New York State's Path Through History as an important site that explores themes and the evolution of Civil Rights.

=== New York State Birding Trail (2025) ===
The Jay Estate was one of 12 locations added to New York State's Birding Trail in 2025.

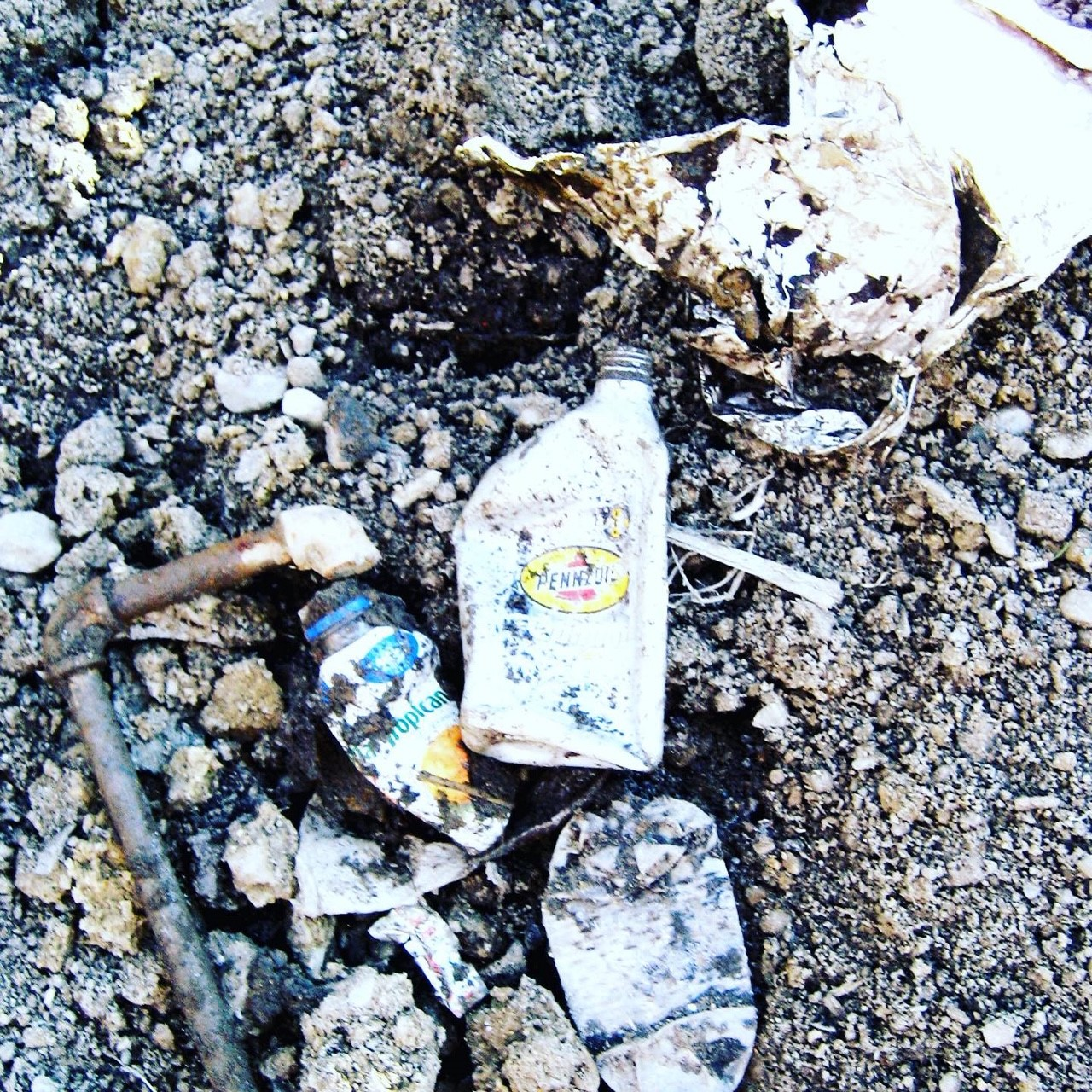

== Controversy ==
In 2010, Westchester County Parks was charged with 4 criminal violations by New York State Department of Environmental Conservation (NYSDEC) when they transported and dumped contaminated fill from Playland Amusement Park at the Jay Estate. The County Parks Commissioner Joe Stout and staff member Peter Tartaglia stated that the fill was "safe" and used in other parks. However, independent testing of the fill revealed high levels of acetone and arsenic used in rat poison. The violations included the County's neglect to remediate landfills that had been added to illegally by contractors during the years of County management from 1992-2010. The dumping incident followed other documented violations by County Parks of SEQR including damage to historic structures and disregard for protection of archaeological resources.

Under the 3 party public-private partnership agreement between New York State Parks, Westchester County Parks and the Jay Heritage Center which was renewed in 2023, the "county will remain responsible for the costs of any environmental remediation that may be required on the property for conditions that existed prior to the license agreement" and yet according to the Jay Heritage Center, confirmed by NYSDEC, as of December 2025 the County remains in violation of its commitment.

== Flora and fauna ==
Native plants and trees found at the Jay Estate include elms, oaks and red maples. The park is also home to numerous wild turkeys, red tailed hawks and coyotes.

Numerous invasive species at the Jay Estate have been noted and mapped with GPS coordinates using the iNaturalist app. Species found including mugwort, multiflora rose, Norway maples, Japanese angelica tree, jetbead, Japanese stiltgrass, Japanese knotweed and wineberry.

== Popular culture ==
John Jay at His Home mural by Guy Pene du Bois at Rye Post Office

- James Fenimore Cooper, a family friend and frequent visitor to both Jay family homes in Rye and Bedford, gave the Rye estate its name, The Locusts. The setting featured prominently in Cooper's first successful novel The Spy (1821). It is believed that the character of Caesar Thompson in the book was based on Caesar Valentine who was enslaved and later freed by the Jay family.
- John Jay at His Home is the title of a Guy Pene du Bois painting at the Rye Post Office that shows John Jay about to leave his Rye home and family to ride circuit.
- The Jay Estate was featured in a popular 2017 NFL and Bud Light ad titled "The Hero's Return."

A History Channel documentary on Alexander Hamilton used the site to recreate scenes of Hamilton's youth, marriage and duel with Aaron Burr.

- In the 1980s, a cult horror film, Spookies, was filmed at the property.
- The Mansion interiors and Jay meadow have appeared in numerous photo shoots for print fashion publications like W Magazine. In 2019, Tory Burch shot her Fall/Winter campaign at the Jay Estate.
- Several episodes of Season 3 of Apple TV's show Dickinson about the poet Emily Dickinson featuring Hailee Steinfeld and directed by Silas Howard were filmed at the property in 2021 using both meadow and the mansion.

== See also ==
- List of burial places of justices of the Supreme Court of the United States

== Sources ==
- Jay, John. Memorials of Peter A. Jay 1905. G.J. Thieme.
- Wells, Laura Jay The Jay Family of La Rochelle and New York, 1938. Order of Colonial Lords of Manors in America.
- Morris, Richard B. Seven Who Shaped Our Destiny: The Founding Fathers as Revolutionaries (New York: Harper & Row, 1973).
- Pfeiffer, John "Preliminary Archaeological Survey of the Boston Post Road Historic District of Rye, NY," April 21, 1982.
- The Modern Builder's Guide, 1833.
- The Beauties of Modern Architecture, 1835.
- Johnson, Herbert Alan, John Jay 1745-1829, 3d Edition, 1995. The University of the State of New York, The State Education Department.
