= Boston Post Road Historic District (Rye, New York) =

Historic district in New York, United States

Coordinates: 40.958487°N 73.701922°W

- U.S. National Register of Historic Places
- U.S. National Historic Landmark District
- New York State Register of Historic Places
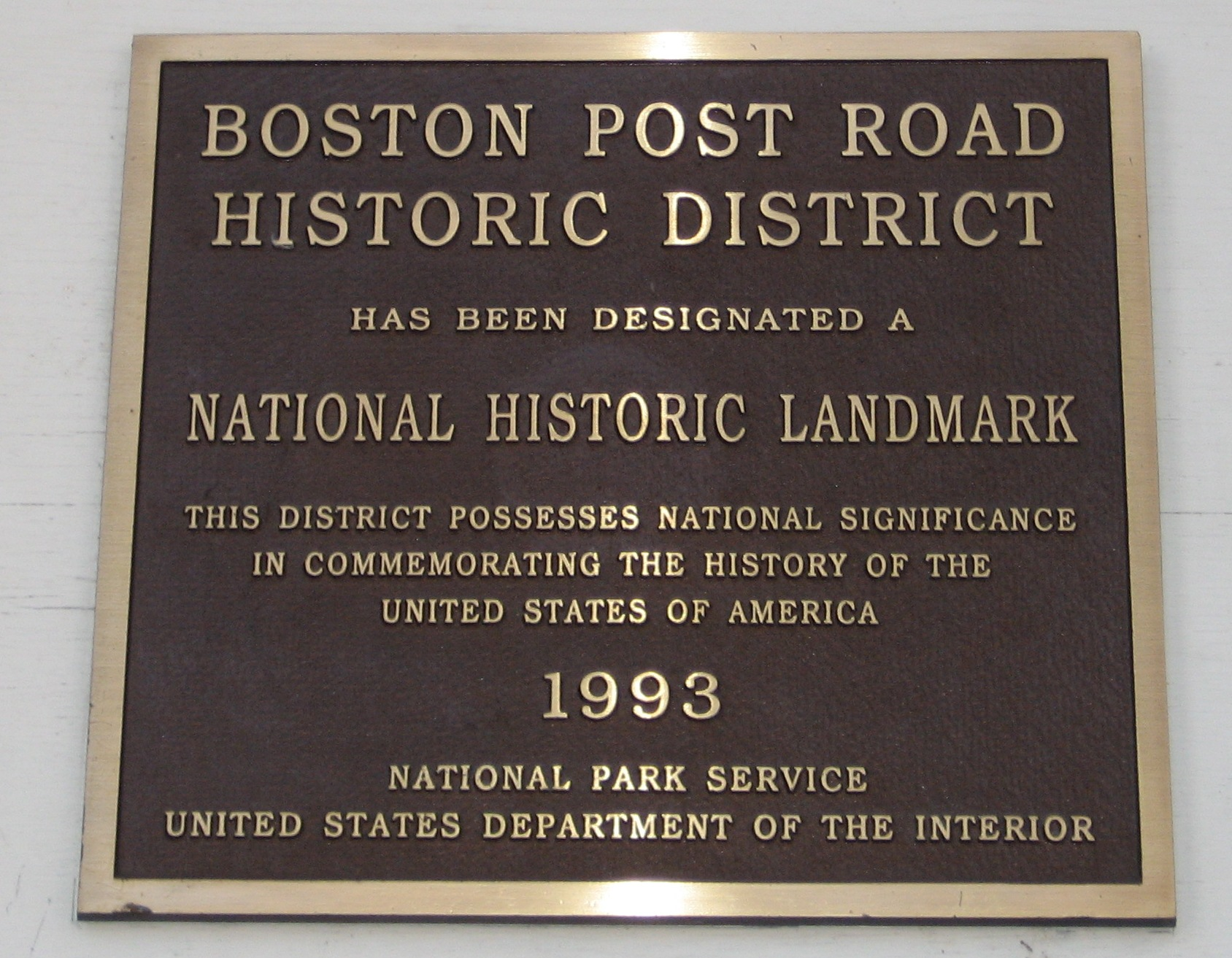
- The National Park Service designated the Boston Post Road Historic District in 1993

- Location within New York Location within the United States
- Location: Rye, New York
- Built: 1838-1854
- Architect: Multiple
- Architectural style: Gothic Revival, Greek Revival
- NRHP reference No.: 82001275
- NYSRHP No.: 11949.000153

Significant dates
- Added to NRHP: October 29, 1982
- Designated NHLD: August 30, 1993
- Designated NYSRHP: September 22, 1982

The Boston Post Road Historic District is a 286-acre (116 ha) National Historic Landmark District in Rye, New York, and is composed of five distinct and adjacent properties. Within this landmarked area are three architecturally significant, pre-Civil War mansions and their grounds; a 10,000-year-old Indigenous peoples site and viewshed; a private cemetery, and a nature preserve. It is one of only 11 National Historic Landmark Districts in New York State and the only National Historic Landmark District in Westchester County. It touches on the south side of the nation's oldest road, the Boston Post Road (US 1), which extends through Rye. A sandstone Westchester Turnpike marker "24", inspired by Benjamin Franklin's original mile marker system, is set into a wall that denotes the perimeter of three of the contributing properties. The district reaches to Milton Harbor of Long Island Sound. Two of the properties included in the National Park Service designation are anchored by Greek Revival buildings; the third property is dominated by a Gothic Revival structure that was designed by Alexander Jackson Davis.

This district, which also has immense archaeological significance and importance to Native American, European-American and African-American heritage, was declared a National Historic Landmark District in 1993. The three-quarters-mile (1.2 km) meadow and viewshed is one of fewer than a dozen such identified Indigenous peoples sites in all of New York State. In 2005, J. Winthrop Aldrich, former assistant to six successive Commissioners of New York State Department of Environmental Conservation (1974–1994) and Deputy Commissioner New York State Office of Parks, Recreation and Historic Preservation (1994-2003; 2007–2010), attested that the District was acknowledged to be "one of New York State's finest assets", "amply deserving the rare honor of National Historic Landmark designation by the Secretary of the Interior."

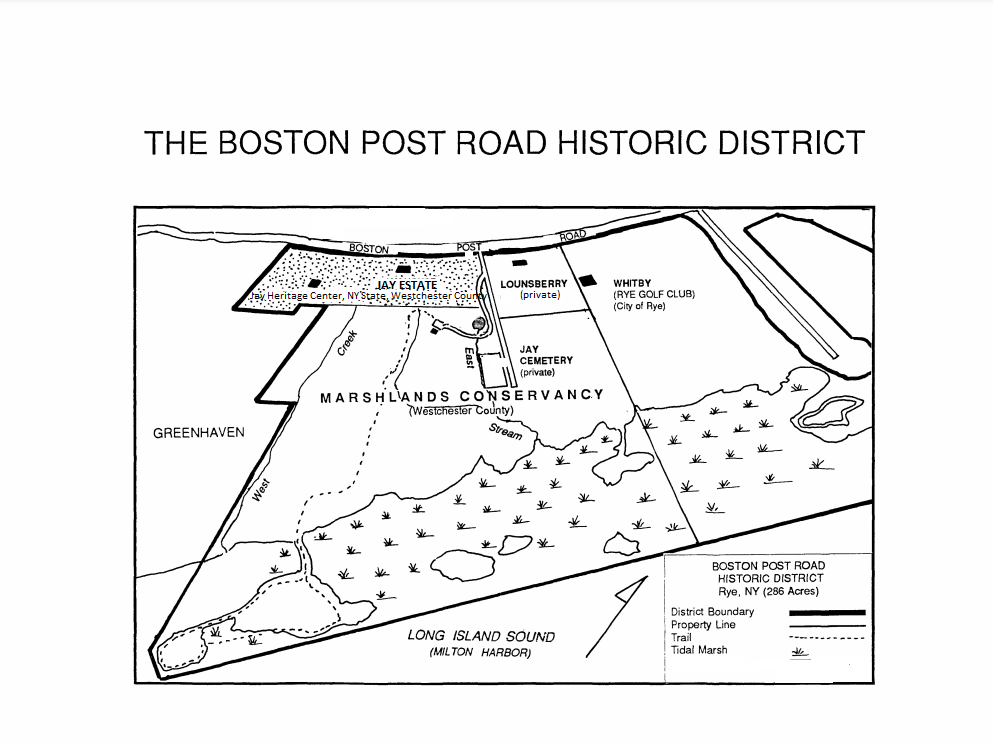
Boston Post Road National Historic District Map, Rye, NY

== Components of the district ==
Included within the district are the following historic buildings, structures, and landscape features:

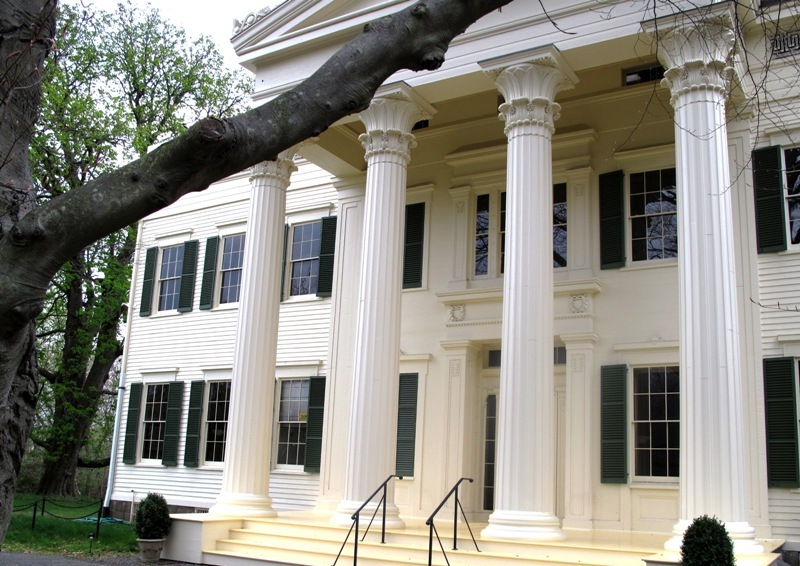
Entrance of the 1838 Peter Augustus Jay House

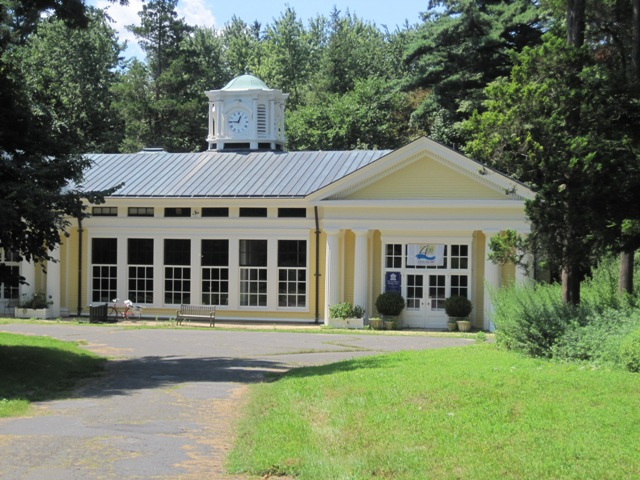
1907 Van Norden Carriage House

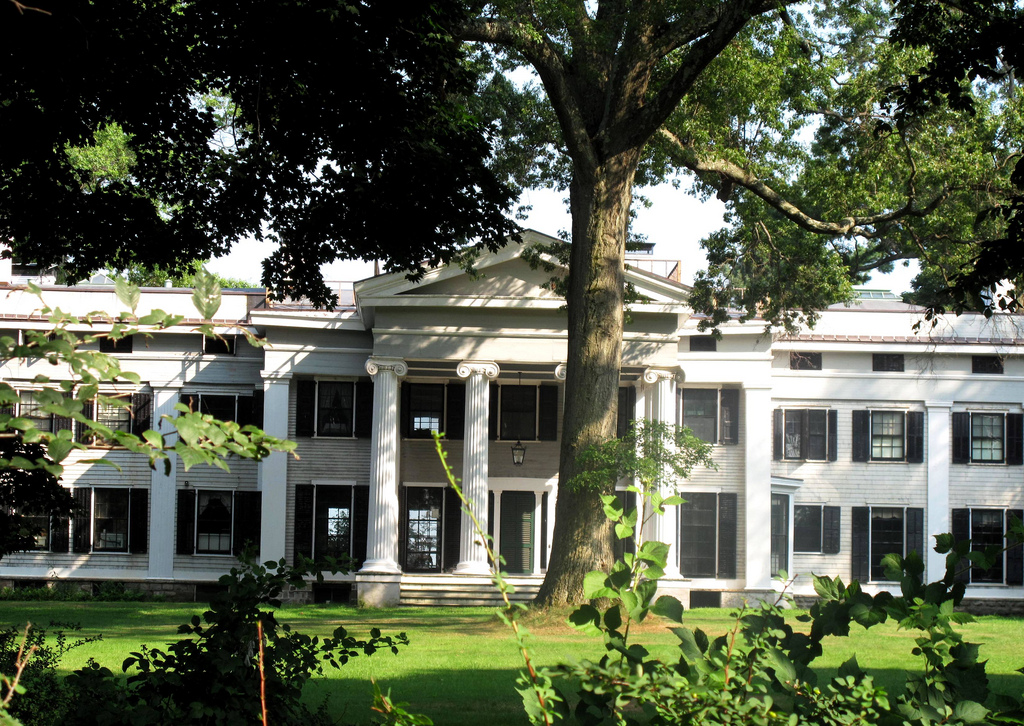
Lounsbury, also known as the Parsons Mansion

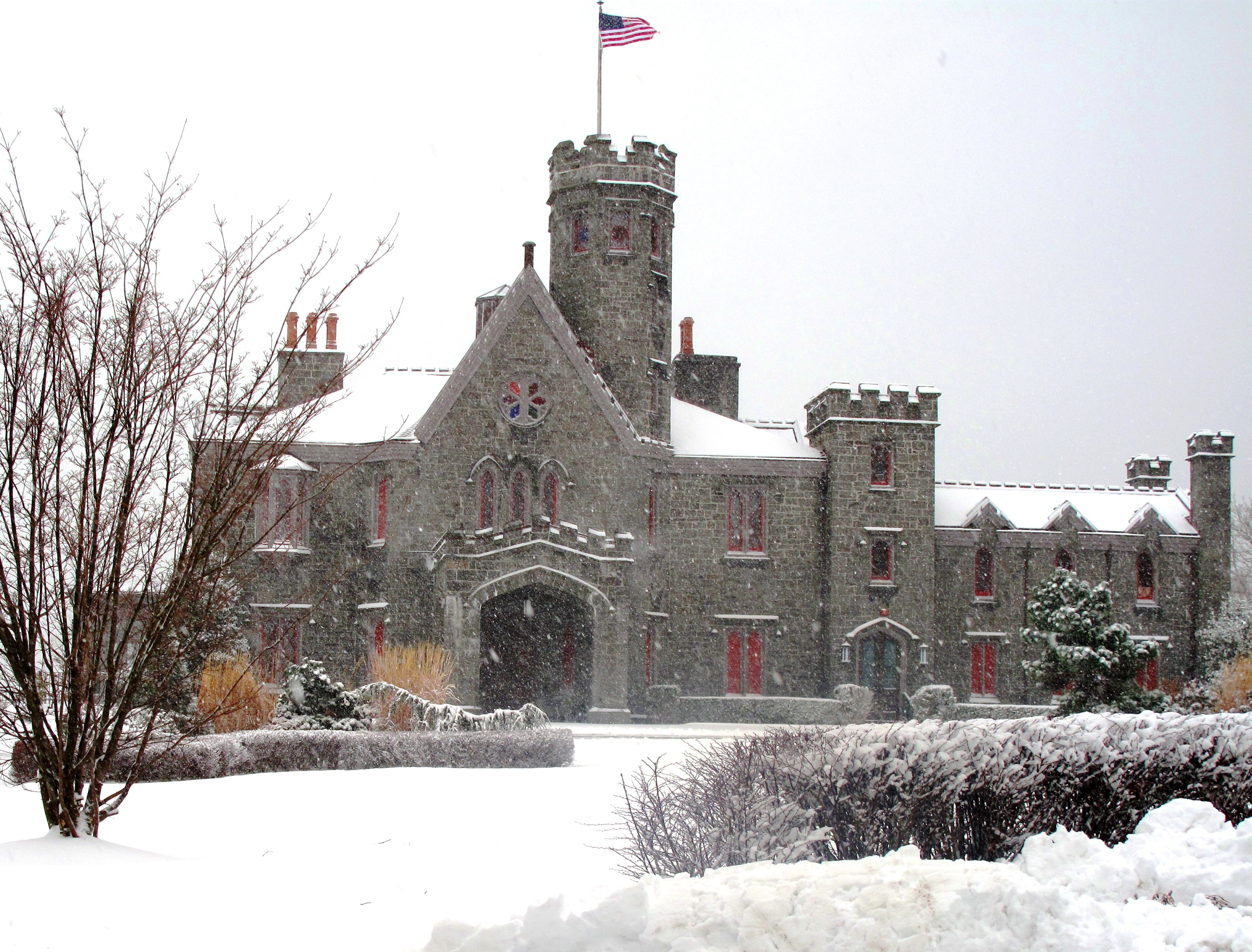
Whitby Castle in winter

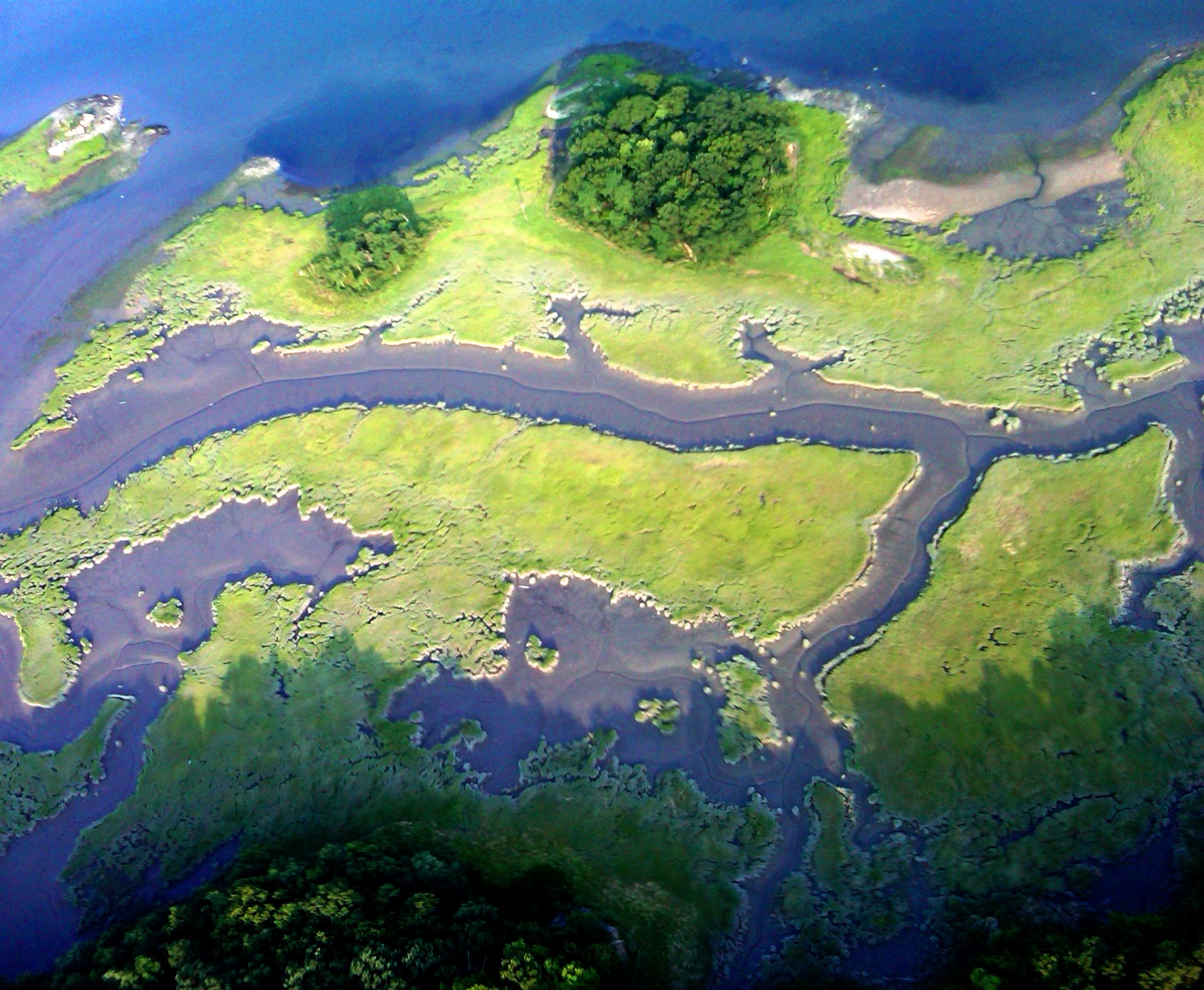
2010 Aerial of Marshlands Conservancy on Long Island Sound

Quartz projectile point and pottery shard found by Dr. Eugene Boesch at Jay Estate

=== Jay Estate (1745 and earlier) ===
The historic 23-acre Jay Estate, including its buildings, landscape, and gardens, is being restored by the not-for-profit Jay Heritage Center. The site was added to the Westchester County African American Heritage Trail in 2004 by then County Executive Andrew Spano because of its association with John Jay and his lasting legacy to abolish slavery through law in his home state beginning in 1777, along with the efforts of his descendants: "With respect to the abolition of slavery in New York, no New Yorker was as persistent, politically skilled, and, ultimately, as legally effective as John Jay." His legacy was complicated: while Jay was founder and president of the Manumission Society of New York, and signed legislation as governor to abolish slavery in 1799, he held enslaved African Americans as workers here until 1810. Free African Americans also worked for wages at his estates.

This house was designated as a member site of the Hudson River Valley National Heritage Area in January 2009 because of 1) the architectural and historical significance of its buildings; 2) as significant parkland it illustrates the role of the Hudson River Valley in the modern environmental movement; 3) the site is associated with great Americans and social issues, particularly the examination of the abolition of slavery; and 4) because of its once notable formal gardens and landscape. Governor Andrew Cuomo added the site to New York State's "Path Through History" in 2013 for its ongoing relevance to the historic interpretation of Civil Rights in New York.

The 1838 Peter Augustus Jay Mansion at the center of the property is owned outright by the Jay Heritage Center; it is one of two Greek Revival residences in the larger landmarked district. The mansion is situated on the site of the childhood home of American Founding Father John Jay, with approximately the same orientation and viewsheds. John Jay's house was built upon the footprint of an older 18th-century farmhouse, "The Locusts". Jay's eldest son, Peter Augustus Jay, replaced it with the current structure in the early nineteenth century. The mansion was constructed according to specifications in a contract between Jay and a builder named Edwin Bishop, and details appear to have been drawn from architectural pattern books by Minard Lafever and Chester Hills. Restoration of the house is an official Save America's Treasures project.

  - 1907 Van Norden Carriage House (designed by Frank A. Rooke)

This bright yellow Classical Revival structure serves as the Visitor Center and is open to the public.

  - 1907 Zebra House (designed by Frank A. Rooke)
  - Tennis House (1917 or earlier)
  - Cottage on Barlow Lane (18th century or earlier)
  - Summer House (1957-8, non-contributing, demolished)
  - Estate Cottage B (demolished)
  - Bowling Alley (demolished)
  - Four outbuildings (demolished)
  - Gazebo (demolished)
  - Gardens designed by Jay family, Brinley & Holbrook and others; includes dry-laid stone ha-ha walls (1822). Currently being restored and rehabilitated by Nelson Byrd Woltz Landscape Architects.

=== Jay Family Cemetery (1806) ===
The Jay Cemetery is a private cemetery of three acres [1.2 ha]. John Jay was buried there in 1829. It is not open to the public.

=== Lounsbury (1831), also known as Lounsberry or the Parsons Estate ===
This second Greek Revival residence in the district has a notable library designed by Delano & Aldrich. It is privately owned and not open to the public.

  - Gardener's Cottage
  - Carriage House and Stable
  - Outbuilding with five bays
  - Poultry and Wood House
  - Greenhouse

=== Rye Golf Club including Whitby Castle (1854) Gothic Revival ===
Former Chapman family residence, which has been adapted for use as the City of Rye Golf Club. Designed by Alexander Jackson Davis

  - Caretaker's house
  - Pool house and golf cart garage (non-contributing)
  - Starter's House (non-contributing)
  - Maintenance building (non-contributing)

=== Marshlands Conservancy (formerly Devereux Reservation, 1966) ===
The Marshlands Conservancy is owned and operated by Westchester County Parks. It is a nature preserve with a diverse number of habitats - several ponds, an East Stream, West Creek, open meadow, woodland, salt marsh, and freshwater wetlands - that attract a variety of flora and fauna. Historically, the land was part of the larger old Jay Estate and the neighboring Parsons Estate. It was formed from two separate gifts in the 20th century: one of 120 acres given by Zilph Devereux to Westchester County on November 9, 1966, and another of 27 acres given by Fanny Wickes Parsons to Westchester County in December 1977. The resulting parcel of 147 acres [59 ha] was rededicated as passive parkland in 1997 by Westchester County so that "The natural area and wildlife sanctuary will be protected, preserved and regulated as a nature and wildlife preserve to be used only for passive recreation." It has been recognized as an Important Bird Area.

== See also ==
- List of National Historic Landmarks in New York
- National Register of Historic Places listings in southern Westchester County, New York
