= Chester Hills =

American architect

- Born: 1798
- Died: 1854
- Occupation: Architect

Chester Hills was author of "The Builder's Guide", an architectural pattern book published in 1846, which, like those of Minard Lafever, influenced architecture in the United States. It is a "practical treatise" on Greek and Roman style architecture.

Two buildings influenced are in Rye, New York: Lounsberry and the 1838 Peter Augustus Jay House within the Boston Post Road Historic District.,

== See also ==
- 1838 Peter Augustus Jay House
