= Parks & Trails New York =

- Parks & Trails New York, Inc.
- Formation: 1985; 41 years ago
- Type: Nonprofit
- Tax ID no.: 14-1753475
- Legal status: 501(c)(3)
- Headquarters: Albany, New York
- Board Chair: Jeffrey P. Bender
- Executive Director: Paul Steely White
- Website: https://www.ptny.org/
- Formerly called: New York Parks and Conservation Association

Parks & Trails New York is New York's leading statewide advocate for parks and trails, dedicated since 1985 to improving our health, economy, and quality of life through the use and enjoyment of green space.

As the leading statewide voice for parks, Parks & Trails New York launched its Campaign for Parks in 2006 with the release of a highly acclaimed report, Parks at a Turning Point – Restoring and enhancing New York’s state park system, which first raised the alarm that New York's park facilities and infrastructure were aging and deteriorating. PTNY's subsequent report, The NYS Park System: An Economic Asset to the Empire State, served as the foundation for its aggressive grassroots organizing and activation of grassroots park Friends groups, which convinced the New York State Legislature to keep parks open in 2010 in the face of draconian proposed budget cuts.

To improve and enhance New York's parks and historic sites and bring visibility to the entire park system and its needs, PTNY launched the annual I Love My Park Day, in which volunteers from across the state participate in cleanup, improvement, and beautification events at New York State parks and historic sites. In collaboration with New York State Office of Parks, Recreation and Historic Preservation (OPRHP) this event will run on a statewide level, providing outreach, promotion, technical assistance and how-to organizer's kits for friends groups to use for their individual events. Friends groups and park staff will oversee cleanup, improvement and beautification projects and work with volunteers. The first annual I Love My Park Day was held on May 5, 2012, where thousands of volunteers, including NYS Governor Andrew Cuomo, helped carry out site improvement projects at more than 40 state parks. In addition, PTNY continues to connect with local friends groups to create a state-wide network of park advocates and supporters. The You Gotta Have Friends newsletter gives updates about parks throughout the state and is designed for friends of the NYS park system.

Another of Parks & Trails New York's priority initiatives is the development and promotion of a statewide network of multi-use trails. As part of this effort, under its Healthy Trails, Healthy People program, PTNY has worked with hundreds of local groups and municipalities interested in creating, supporting, and promoting local multi-use trails. PTNY also founded and spearheads the Statewide Trails Coalition, which advocates for increased funding and supportive public policies for community trails and the statewide trails network.

As part of its technical assistance to grassroots park and trail groups, PTNY's Growing the Grassroots program provides capacity-building grants to groups interested in strengthening their outreach, communications, membership development, or fundraising.

Since 1998, Parks & Trails New York has been working in partnership with the New York State Canal Corporation to help communities along the 524-mile NYS Canal System organize, plan, and develop the Canalway Trail and to build awareness of the Erie Canal corridor as a premier destination for bicyclists and other outdoor enthusiasts. A new report from PTNY and the Canalway Trails Association New York (CTANY), Closing the Gaps: A Progress Report on the Erie Canalway Trail, cites the progress being made to close the five remaining gaps in the 365-mile canalway trail. PTNY's campaign to Close the Gaps, endorsed by Senator Kirsten Gillibrand in the fall of 2010, has generated dramatically renewed interest in completing the trail among citizens, community leaders, and elected officials at all levels of government. Also, PTNY publishes a Canalway Trail Times newsletter, giving updates and information surrounding the Canalway Trail.

In addition to organizing and supporting local park and trail groups through workshops and other targeted technical assistance, Parks & Trails New York provides an interactive Erie Canalway Trail web site experience at Cycle the Erie Canal. This website provides a comprehensive guide to the cross-state Erie Canalway Trail with maps, lodging, attractions, historic sites, bike shops and more. Also available on Parks & Trails New York's website is a guide to more than 110 trails in New York State; as well as alerts, updates and other essential information for parks and trail users and activists, including electronic and print newsletters (Parks & Trails E-NEWS and GreenSpace).

== Bike Tours ==
PTNY sponsors an annual eight-day cross-state bicycle tour along the Erie Canal and publishes a popular guidebook, Cycling the Erie Canal, available on-line and in hard copy.

PTNY also sponsors an annual six-day bicycle tour of the historic Hudson Valley, starting in Albany and ending in New York City. In 2012, the first edition of Cycling the Hudson Valley was published. This guide to history, art, and nature on the East and West sides of the majestic Hudson River is also available on-line and in hard copy.
