= Marshlands Conservancy =

Nature preserve in Rye, New York, US

- U.S. Historic district – Contributing property
- U.S. National Historic Landmark District – Contributing property
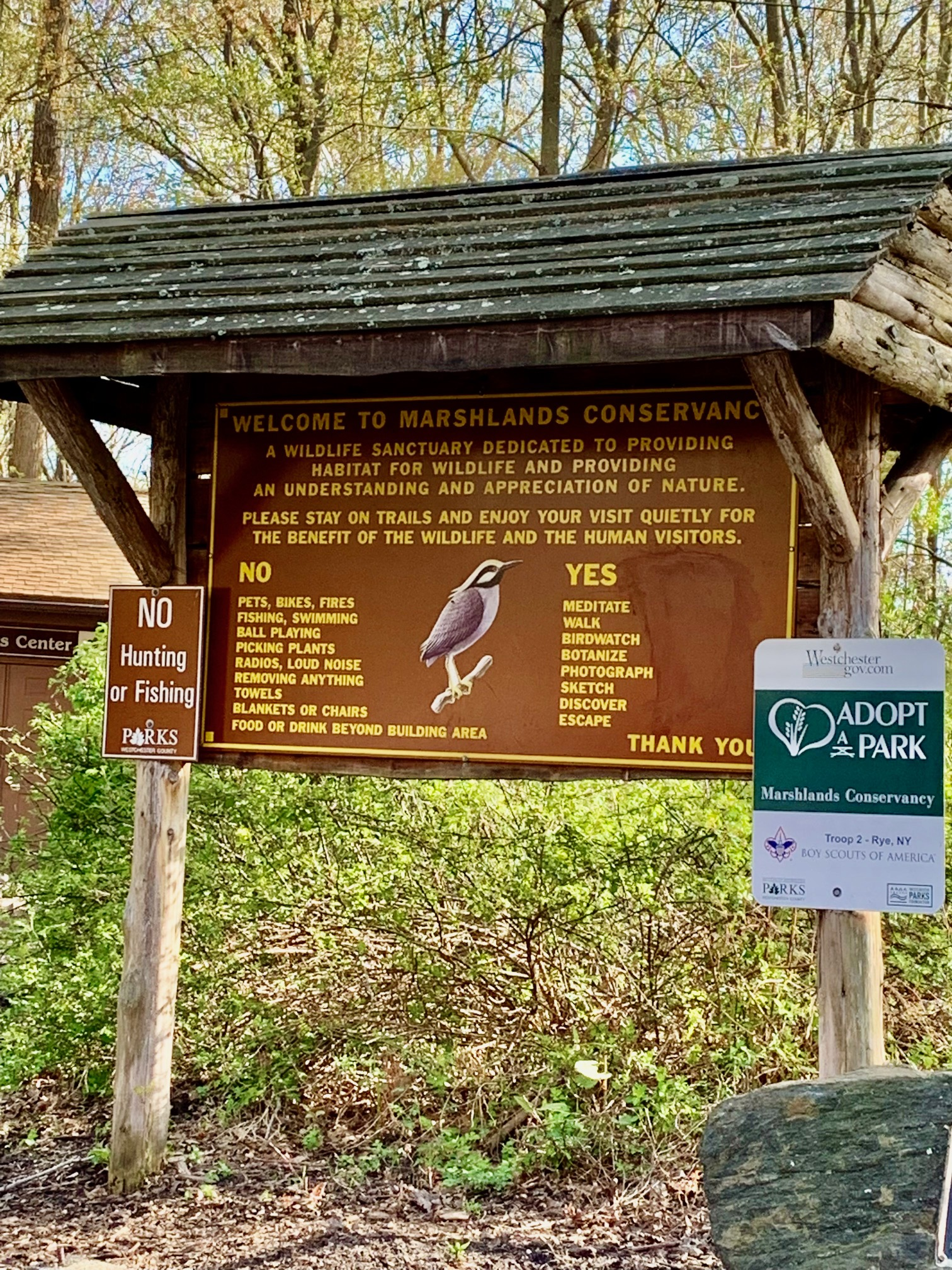
- Location: 220 Boston Post Road, Rye, New York
- Coordinates: 40°57′13″N 73°42′08″W
- Area: 147 acres (59 ha)
- Website: www.marshlandsconservancy.org
- Part of: Boston Post Road Historic District (Rye, New York) (ID82001275)

Significant dates
- Added to NRHP: October 29, 1982
- Designated NHLDCP: August 30, 1993

Marshlands Conservancy is a 147-acre wildlife sanctuary in the city of Rye, New York, fully owned and operated by Westchester County Parks. It was originally the home of the Wecquaesgeek tribe before it was acquired by one of the earliest founders of Rye, John Budd. It was later owned by the family of American peacemaker John Jay.

Today, it has numerous wildlife habitats, ranging from ponds to creeks to a large meadow area, succession forest, freshwater wetlands, and the only extensive salt marsh in Westchester. At its farthest boundary, it borders Long Island Sound. It can be accessed via a private lane which is owned by the Jay descendants and located off the historic Boston Post Road. It is one of 5 properties that together constitute the Boston Post Road Historic District, the only National Historic Landmark District in Westchester County. It has high archaeological sensitivity.The conservancy has also been designated an Important Bird Area.

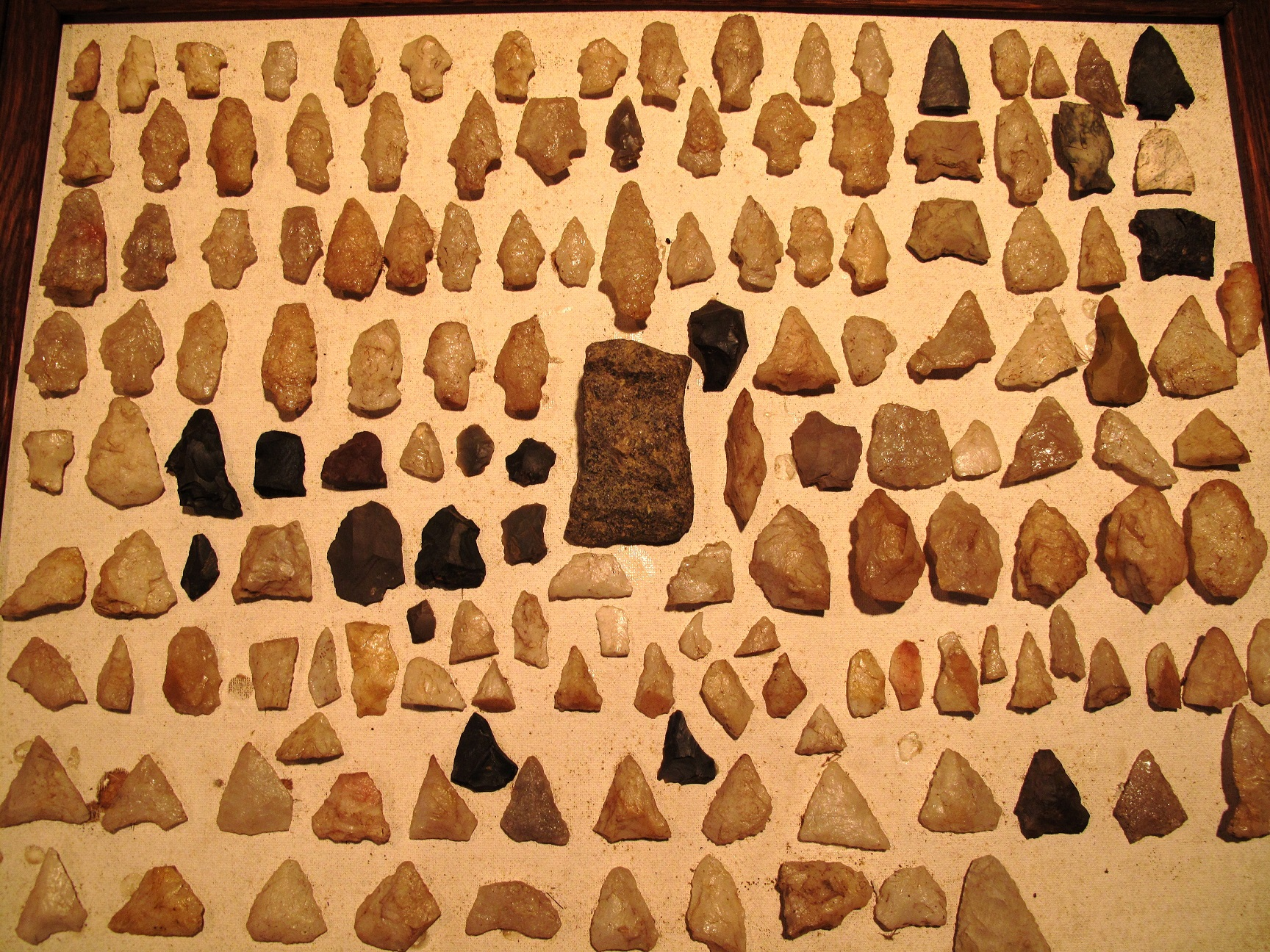
Rye Marshlands archaeological artifacts

== Mission ==
The park is a "rare expanse of undeveloped land along the Sound" "dedicated to providing undisturbed habitat for wildlife and a peaceful oasis for people to discover and understand their natural environment."

== Early history (Precontact - 1661) ==
Archaeological evidence supports the presence of a vibrant Indigenous peoples population at the Conservancy for thousands of years. Findings include the identification of pre-contact deposits from the Archaic and Woodland periods. It is believed that Indigenous stewards cleared brush to prevent reforestation and facilitate hunting and agriculture. They were attracted by plentiful fishing areas and freshwater streams. Historic shell middens of oyster and clam shells support their activities there.

== Budd ownership (1661 - 1745) ==
The land was purchased by John Budd. Elements of the land, such as the field, were also regularly cleared by its colonial residents. It was referred to as Budd's Neck and stayed in the Budd family through 1745.

== Jay ownership (1745 - 1905) ==
The land then was sold by John Budd to Peter Jay and Mary Van Cortlandt, the parents of Revolutionary era patriot, jurist and diplomat John Jay. The land would be owned by John Jay's sibling Peter, and by John Jay himself. It was later passed on to John Jay's descendants. Jay family ownership lasted between 1745 and 1905 and the parcel was 400 acres in size. Other residents of the property who worked and shaped the land in the 1600s through 1800s were enslaved and freed African-Americans, some of whom were buried on site.

Another portion of the conservancy was originally part of neighboring Lounsbury owned by the Parsons family as far back as the early 1800s. Famous owners of the land included John E. Parsons and American anthropologist and archaeologist Elsie Clews Parsons.

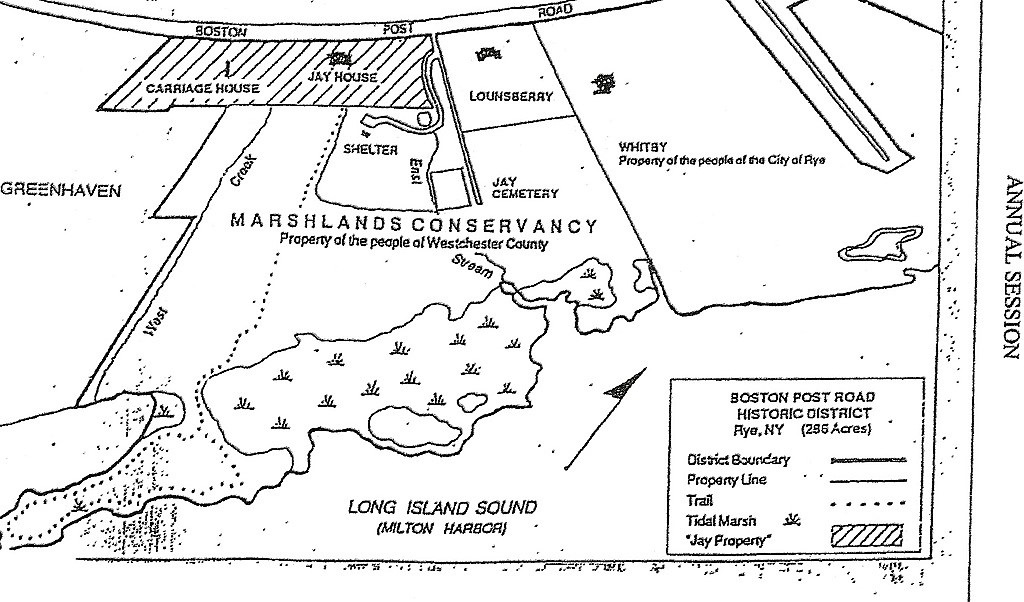
Map of Boston Post Road Historic District's 5 contributing properties plus historic watercourses, the East Stream and West Creek

== Dedication as a nature preserve (1966–present) ==
The Conservancy came into being through two separate real estate donations, one in 1966 and a second in 1977.

=== Devereux donation (1966) ===
The nature preserve was initially named the Devereux Reservation or Conservancy. The original gift consisted of 120 acres from Zilph Palmer Devereux to Westchester County, made on November 9, 1966, and formally accepted by the Westchester County Board of Supervisors on November 21, 1966. The land was intended to be kept as a completely natural park.

A small shelter was built in 1972, and the property reopened as Marshlands Park on June 7, 1972, during the dedication of the preserve. A special volunteer Advisory Board was created to ensure continued oversight of the County's management of the land.

=== Parsons donation (1977) ===
Another donation of 17 acres (plus 10 acres tidal land) was contributed by Fanny Wickes Parsons in 1977 from the acreage of her family's estate called Lounsbury. The gift came with the caveat "that no garages or maintenance buildings be erected and that no marinas be built on or near the shorefront of the tract." In addition to her dedication to protecting wildlife, Mrs. Parsons was also part of the coalition that saved the Jay Estate next door to her home from development in the 1980s.

=== Legislation by Westchester County (1997) ===
The ensuing property of 147 acres [59 ha] (which includes tidal lands) was rededicated in 1997 as passive parkland by the Board of Legislators of Westchester County "The natural area and wildlife sanctuary will be protected, preserved and regulated as a nature and wildlife preserve to be used only for passive recreation." That same year, a Friends group was organized to help staff the shelter and provide tours as well as raise additional funds to supplement the maintenance and mowing of the meadow.

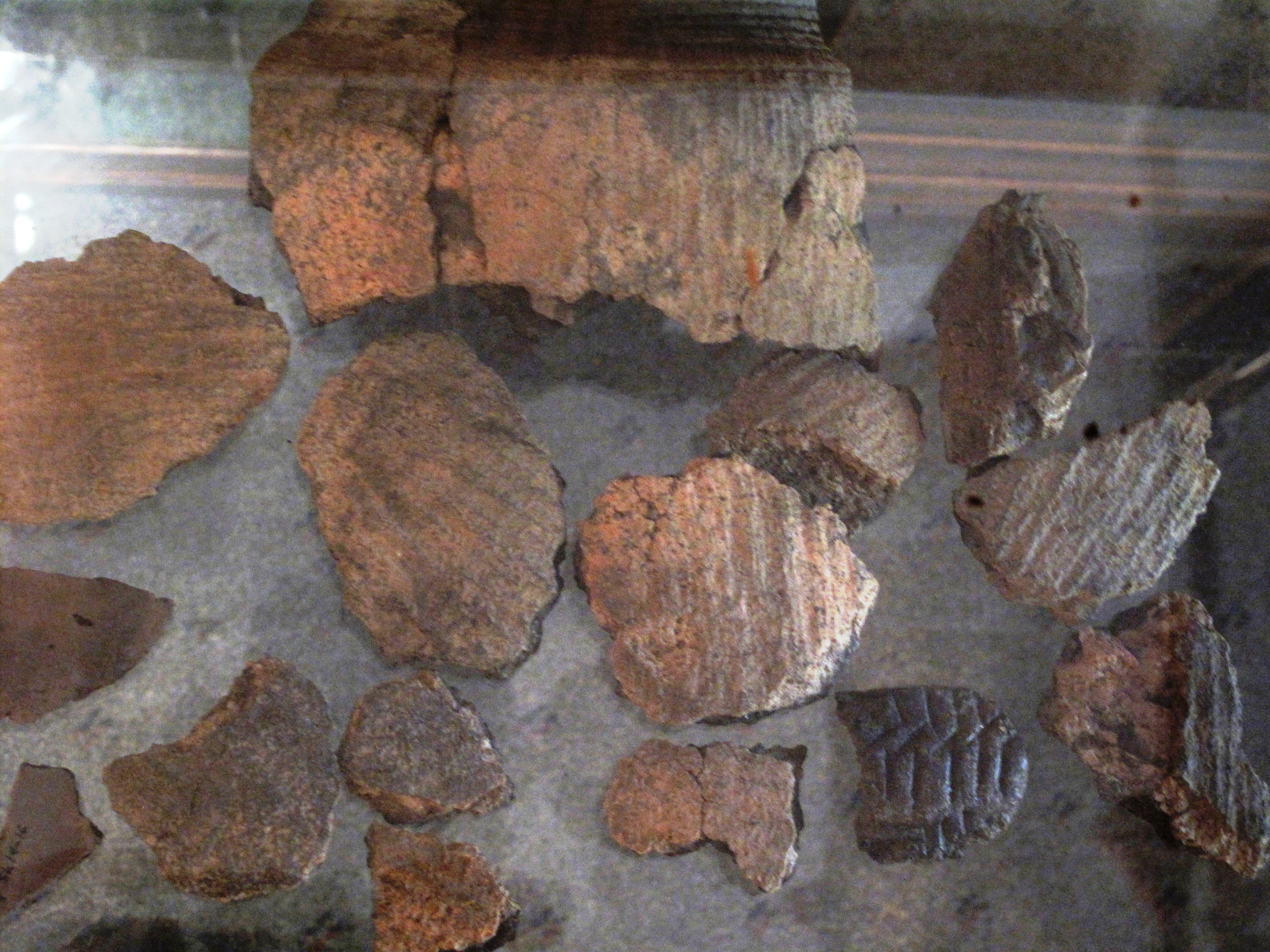
Rye Marshlands Conservancy - pottery fragments from archaeology 1969

== Cultural resources ==
=== Archaeological sensitivities ===
Numerous reports have long confirmed the importance of Marshlands Conservancy as a highly archaeologically sensitive area. It is one of many sites in Rye with such importance which also include an area in the Blind Brook watershed. Wilbur Clark, a founder of the Museum and Laboratory of Archaeology at the Muscoot Reservation in Croton-on-Hudson and student of Lenape culture found numerous artifacts.

Thousand-year old pottery fragments called sherds, flakes and projectile points were found by two brothers, Frank and Pat Vetere in the 1960s. Frank was the primary collector and discovered rare tools including hammerstones, scrapers and a rare cutting implement called a celt. Certain of the items found dated back to 3000 B.C. and are currently on exhibit at the Harrison Historical Society.

In 1982, New York State archaeologist John Pfeiffer mapped out areas of high concern including a rock shelter, quarry, farm animal gravesite and more in a planning document called the Closs Report noting the presence of Indigenous and colonial era deposits.

=== First Peoples ===
The discovery of 88 stone fishtail points and fragments, 31 of which were collected between 1981 and 1987 by Stuart Fiedel, suggests encampments of what is known as an Orient phase or culture at the site. The presence of other cultural deposits were documented as recently as 2007 (Hartgen) and 2009 (Boesch).

=== African Americans ===
Marshlands Conservancy was once part of a larger property called the Jay farm. Based on historical accounts including census records, it is known that anywhere from a dozen to perhaps two dozen people were enslaved by both the Budd and Jay families and worked there. Some were freed there and some buried there on the original parcel which at that time included the Marshlands property. One burial of a man named Caesar Valentine was recorded to have taken place in 1847.

== Natural resources ==
=== Salt marsh and tidal flats ===
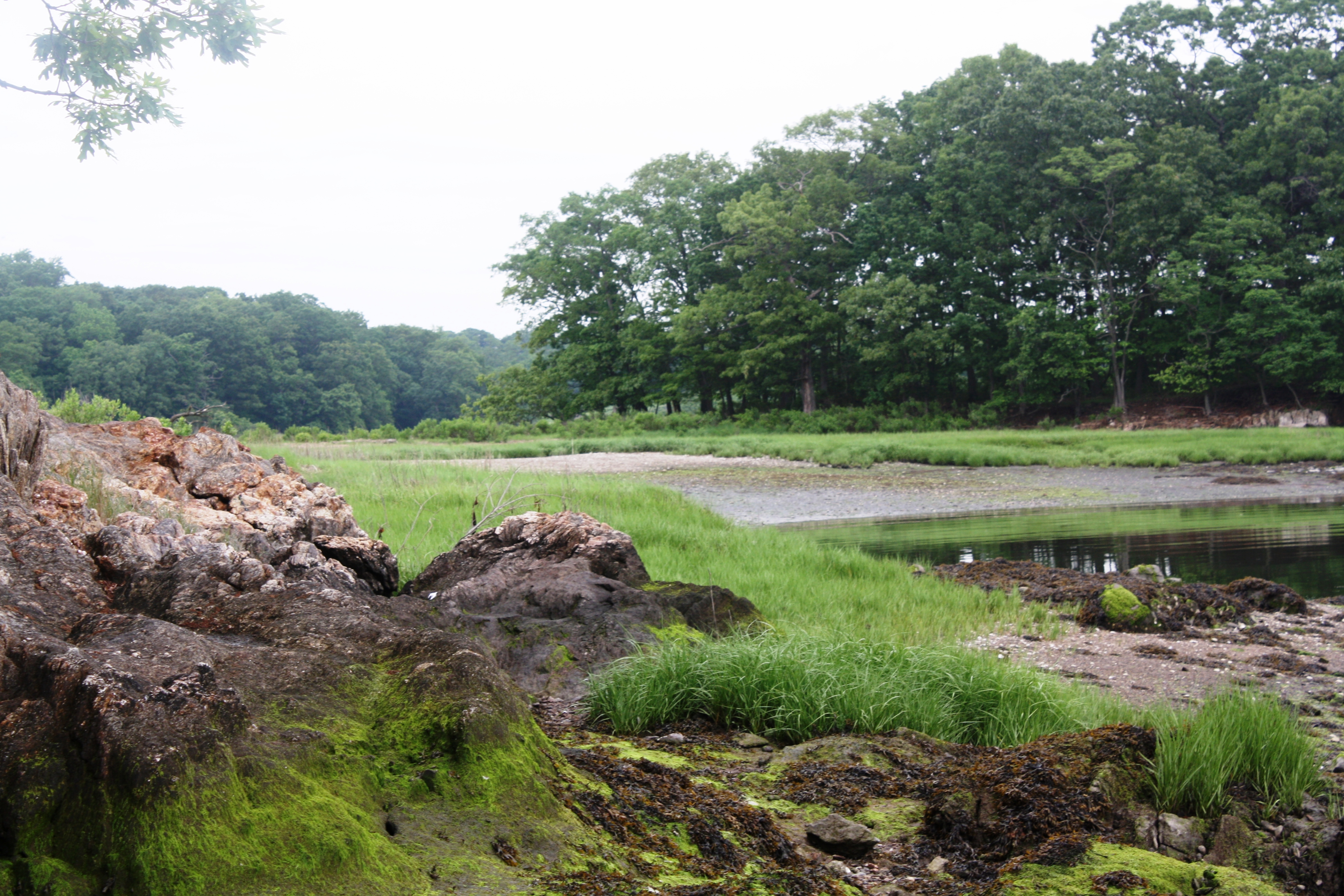
Tidal flats at Marshlands

The preserve's salt marsh was recognized in 1987 as a rare ecosystem and tidal flats community by the N.Y.S. Department of State Division of Coastal Resources & Waterfront Revitalization.

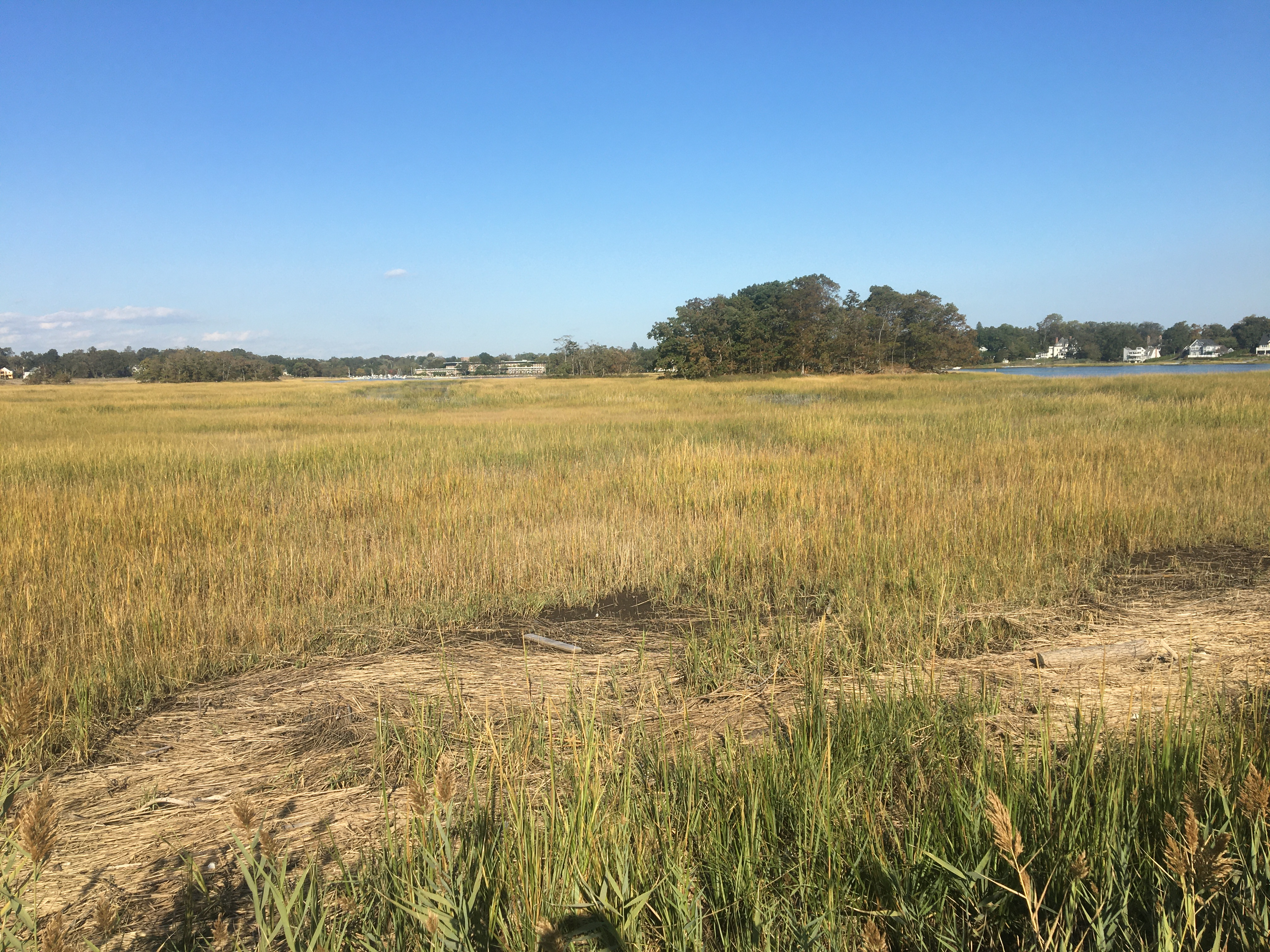
Salt marsh in early autumn

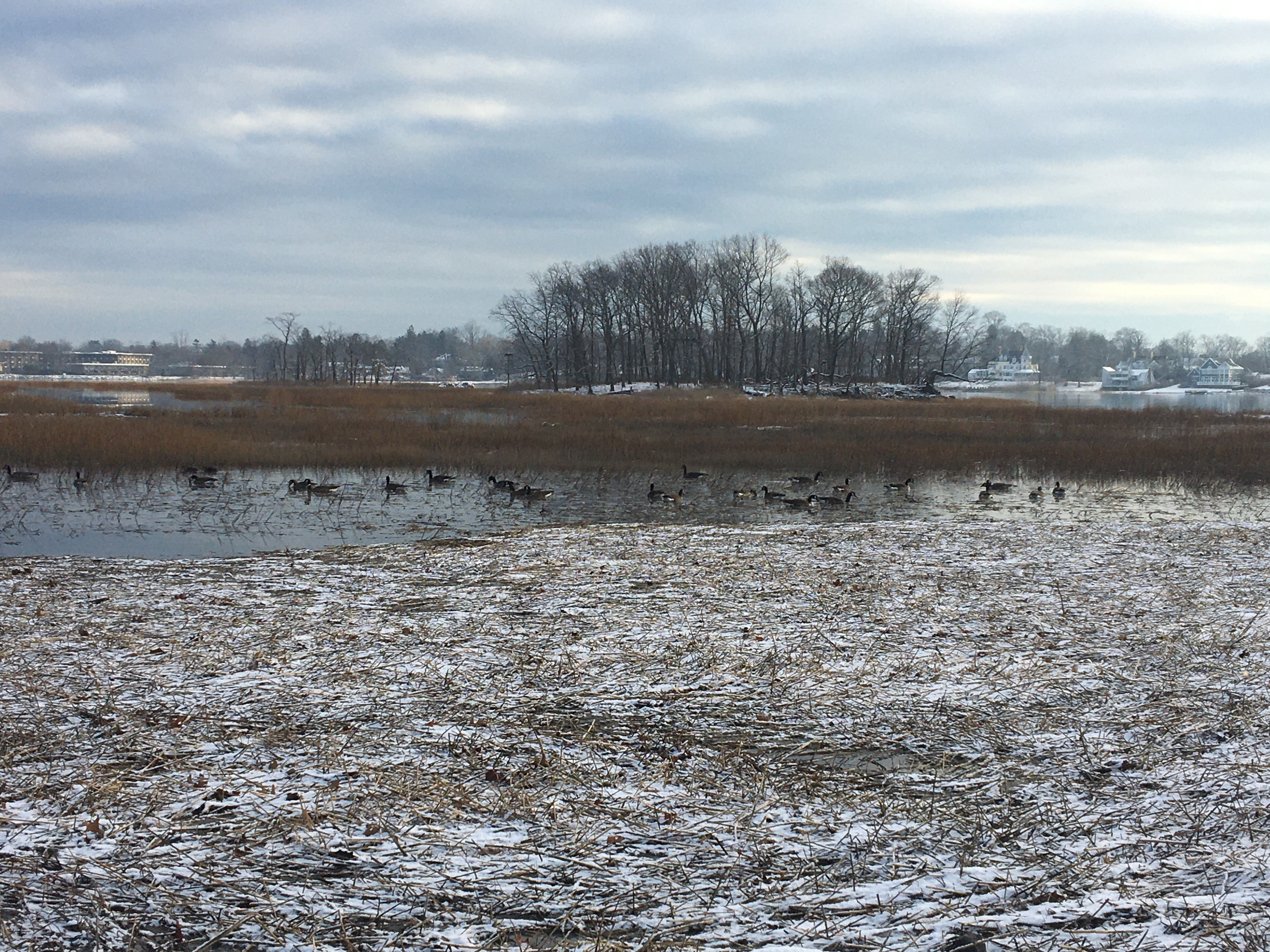
Salt marsh in winter with Canada geese in the water

=== Woodland trails and ruins ===
There are two trail loops. One is 2.8 miles long. Passive recreation only is permitted at Marshlands Conservancy including walking, hiking and birdwatching. Dogs and bikes are strictly forbidden according to regulations adopted on December 31, 1975. Ruins of a summer home built on the property by 20th century owners can be found on the trail alongside the water. All that remains is a chimney and stone foundation.

=== Watercourses ===
The East Stream and West Creek are two fresh watercourses that run through the Marshlands Conservancy. They are both referenced by Westchester County in 1997 legislation (see map inset). They are habitat for American mink, snapping turtles and box turtles.

== Fauna ==
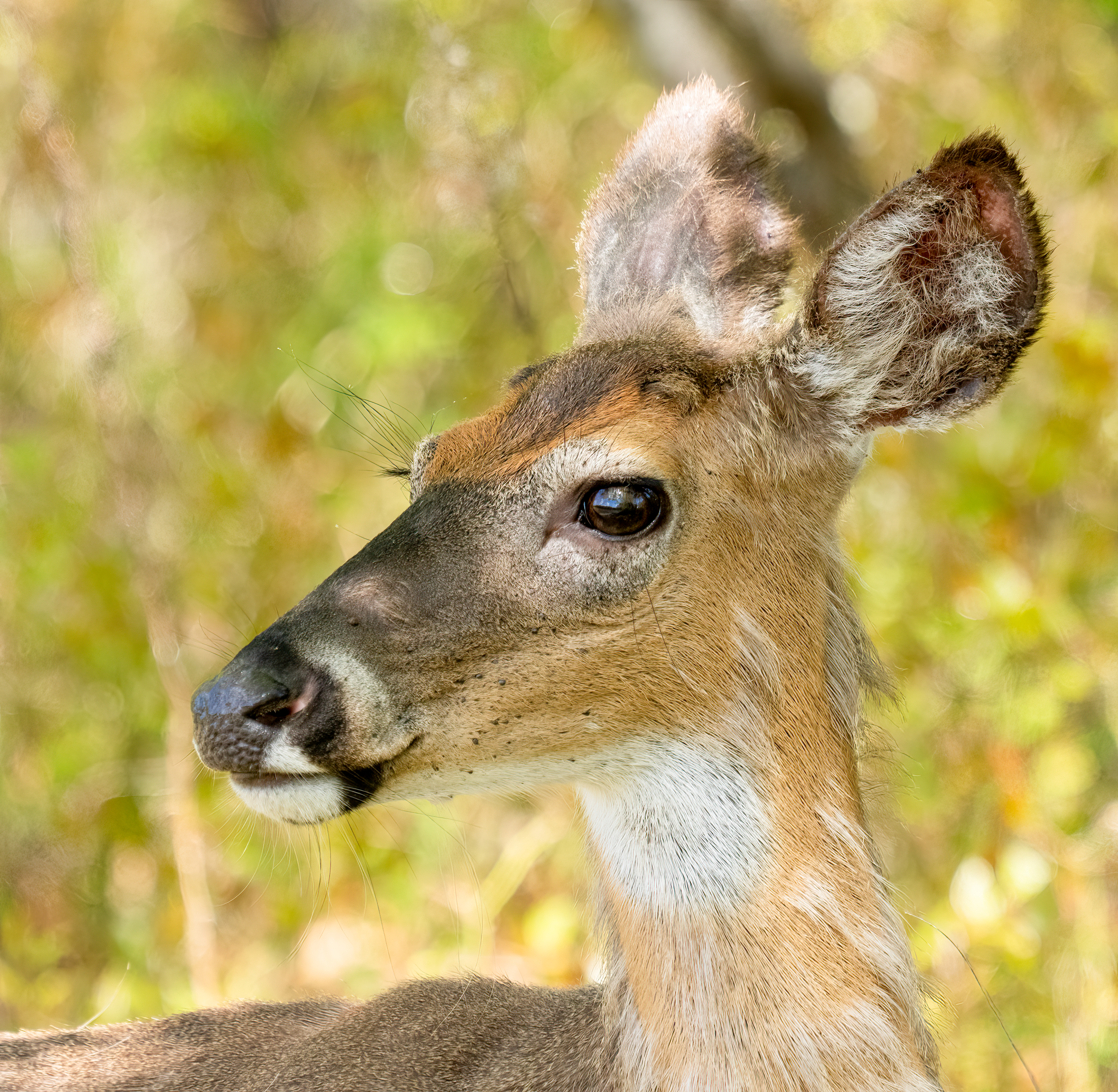
White-tailed deer

Marshlands Conservancy is home to many creatures from horseshoe crabs to coyotes. Visitors can see foxes, herons, egrets and more. Nature study is especially focused on salt water life.

=== Birds ===
The Conservancy land was donated with the goal of creating a wildlife sanctuary especially for waterfowl and migratory birds. Over 230 species of birds have been spotted from Black rail to American Avocet. New York State has 200 species of rare birds and one of them, which is listed as one of special concern, a red-headed woodpecker (Melanerpes erythrocephalus) was recently spotted at the Conservancy on a dead tree in December 2025.

=== Fish and shellfish ===
Marine life at Marshlands include pipefish, small crabs (often hidden in rocky structures off of the water), and killifish.

=== Mammals ===
Deer, fox, coyotes, rabbits and groundhogs are among the mammals that have habitats at the conservancy.

== Flora ==
A trail guide published in the 1980s under the auspices of then Westchester County Executive Alfred DelBello and Parks Commissioner Joseph M. Claverly noted the location of both native and invasive species along pathways, in the woods, next to bridges and by the beach and marsh.

=== Native plants and trees ===
The biodiversity of the Marshlands Conservancy has changed since its creation as a preserve. Native plants found at the Conservancy once included:

- Black birch
- Bladderwrack
- Butterfly weed
- Christmas fern
- Dogtooth violet
- False Solomon's seal
- Giant sunflower
- Glasswort
- Groundsel tree
- Heath aster
- Jewelweed
- Lopseed
- Marsh elder
- Marsh mallow
- New York aster
- Poison ivy
- Post oak
- Sassafras
- Seaside goldenrod
- Skunk cabbage
- Spartina
- Spicebush
- Sweet gum
- Trillium
- Tulip tree
- White ash
- White oak
- Wild geranium
- Wild strawberry

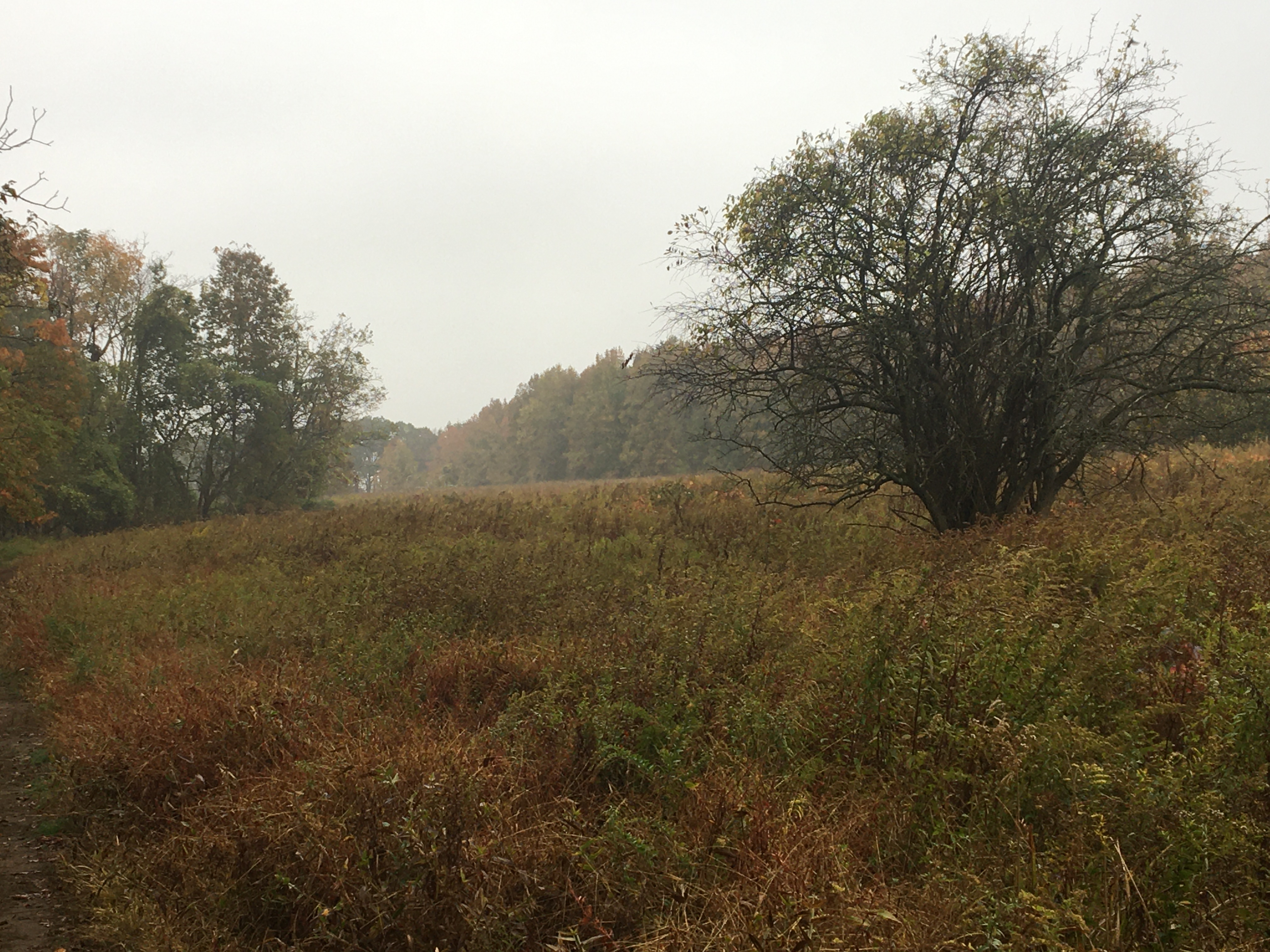
Long meadow in early autumn

=== Invasive species ===
Like many other sanctuaries that are impacted by climate change, the ecology of Marshlands is changing due to the aggressive pressure of invasive species. Disturbed waste areas at the conservancy include a refuse dump next to the long meadow where Tree of Heaven can be found. According to Audubon, invasive plants like Tatarian honeysuckle and Norway maples cause harm to native plants and the local ecosystem. Other invasive species identified include:

- Common burdock
- Crabapple
- Creeping bellflower
- Curly dock
- Deptford pink
- Everlasting pea
- Garlic mustard
- Japanese barberry
- Japanese knotweed
- Japanese stiltgrass
- Jetbead
- Mugwort
- Multiflora rose
- Norway maples
- Oriental bittersweet
- Phragmites
- Porcelainberry
- Privet
- Tatarian honeysuckle
- Tree of heaven
- Wineberry
- Wrinkled rose

Asian shore crabs have been implicated in the decline of the common periwinkle at Marshlands.

== Controversy ==
Concerns about the impact of construction and development on or adjacent to the Marshlands Conservancy have existed for a long time. Most recently, area residents have raised concerns about a $10,845,000 plan to dig in the nature preserve without environmental review or notification of neighbors and area stakeholders including the City of Rye and New York State. Descendants of John Jay are among those requesting greater transparency and compliance with environmental and archaeological due diligence. Repeated requests by the public and the press for information have been rebuffed by Westchester County.

In January 2026, Afro-Indigenous descendants of the area also voiced their opposition to construction at the site. In March 2026, the Jay Heritage Center and the Preservation League of New York State raised additional legal concerns about the project's potential impact on environmental, cultural and archaeological resources.
