= Path Through History =

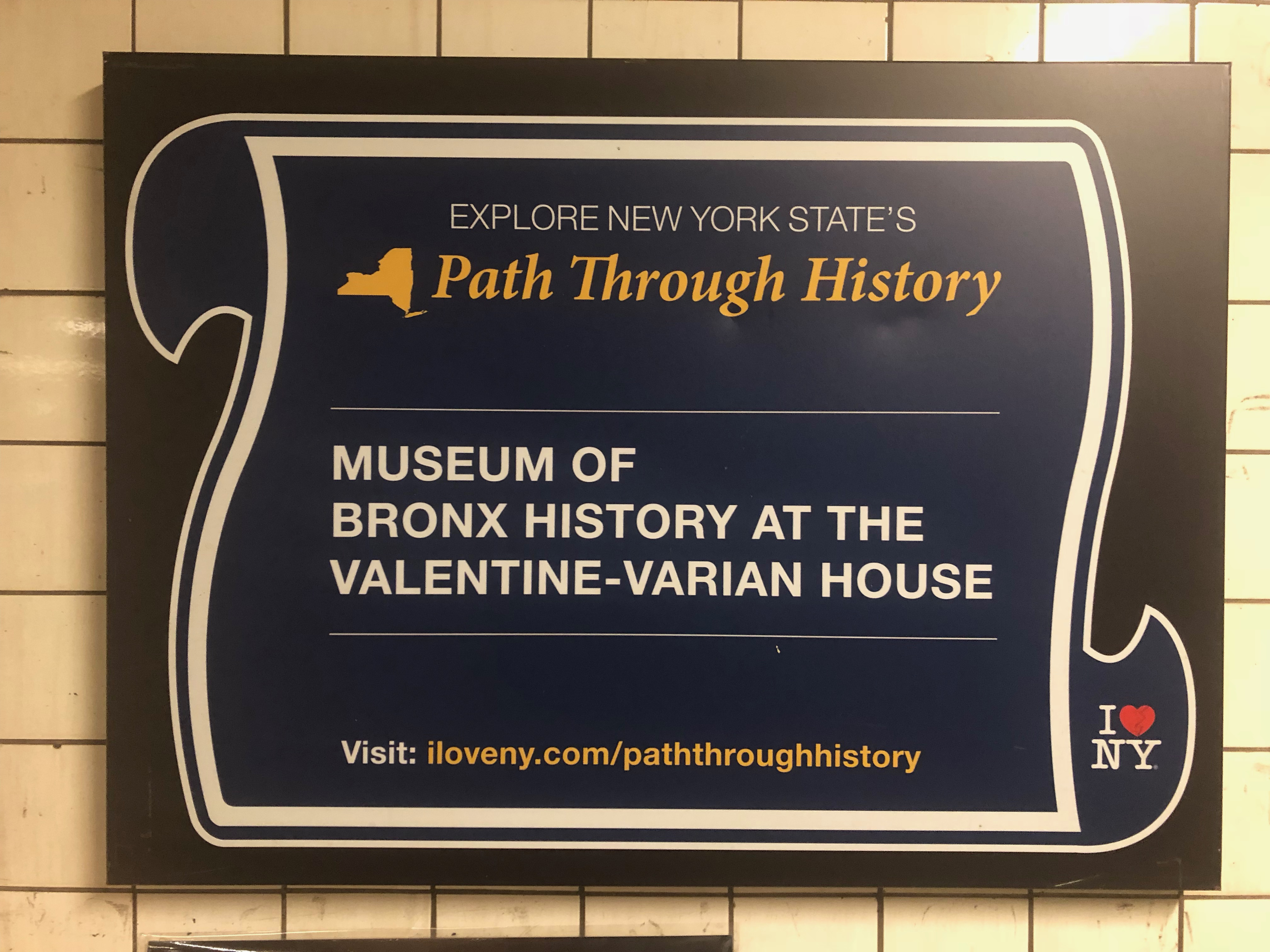
NYS Path Through History Sign Museum of Bronx History

New York State's Path Through History is a tourism and economic development initiative formed to promote increased visitation to more than seven hundred historic sites throughout the state. The "path" is organized by theme and region. It was launched in 2012 by then-governor Andrew Cuomo and highlighted through the very prominent installation of blue and gold colored directional signs on streets, subways and major highways. Today the program is administered under the auspices of I Love New York and the Empire State Development Corporation.

== History ==
The "Path Through History" concept was first unveiled at a gathering of over 200 historians and parks stewards in Albany on August 28, 2012. Co-Chairs of the strategic branding effort were Mark Schaming, Director of the New York State Museum and Lincoln historian Harold Holzer. Other advisors for the endeavor included Robert Weible, New York State Historian, Dr. Robert Harris of Cornell University, Kenneth T. Jackson, Professor in History and the Social Sciences at Columbia University, Dr. Lisa Keller, Professor of History, Urban and Women Studies at SUNY Purchase, and Dr. Thomas A Chambers, Professor of History, Niagara University.

In 2015, a companion website was created, and the searchable database was designed to allow tourists to find attractions and events throughout the state easily and create their own unique travel itinerary. A specific Path Through History Weekend was scheduled during the month of June featuring a plethora of special events to further create excitement about exploring museums, parks and natural spaces. During the pandemic in 2020, Path Through History Weekend took place as a virtual event. Informational kiosks at rest stations also highlight area attractions.

== Geographical and thematic distribution ==
The original Path Through History sites were divided into 10 regions: Western NY, Finger Lakes, Central New York, Southern Tier, Mohawk Valley, Capital Region, North Country, Mid-Hudson, New York City, and Long Island. Those regions were reorganized and expanded to 11 areas; today they include: Adirondacks, Central New York, Greater Niagara, New York City, Capital-Saratoga, Chautauqua-Allegheny, Hudson Valley, Thousand Islands-Seaway, Catskills, Finger Lakes and Long Island.

Historic sites were originally sorted into twelve different categories: Arts and Culture; Canals and Transportation; Civil Rights; Colonial History; Innovation and Commerce; Native Americans; Natural History; The Revolution; Sports History; U.S. Presidents; War of 1812; and Women’s Rights. More recently, the category of Immigration was added and the category of Civil Rights was expanded into Equal Rights.

== Highway signage controversy ==
Over $1.8 million was spent on Path Through History highway signs with the objective of stimulating greater economic growth through heritage and cultural tourism especially in upstate New York but the federal government was quick to criticize the billboards pointing out that their size and array of logos could distract and endanger drivers on the highway. As punishment, the federal government withheld $14 million in critical infrastructure funding from New York State pending its removal of the dangerous non-conforming signs. In response, New York State pledged to remove 80% of the signs and the $14 million was released. As part of a settlement agreement, some signs were allowed to remain so that their impact could be further evaluated.

== Economic impact ==
Others cite the positive aspects of the campaign and say it has had traction in the digital marketing space. One analysis of the economic impact of heritage tourism in the first year of the program (2013) estimated a benefit of $5 billion in revenue.
