= David Clarkson (banker) =

American banker (1795–1867)

President of the New York Stock Exchange
- In office 1837–1851
- Preceded by: R. D. Weeks
- Succeeded by: Henry G. Stebbins

Personal details
- Born: March 27, 1795
- Died: June 3, 1867 (aged 72) New York City, New York, U.S.
- Spouse: Elizabeth Streatfield Clarkson (m. 1822)
- Children: 11
- Parent(s): Matthew Clarkson; Sally Cornell Clarkson

David Clarkson (March 27, 1795 – June 3, 1867) was an American banker who was president of the New York Stock Exchange from 1837 to 1851.

== Early life ==
He was the eldest son of eight children born to Gen. Matthew Clarkson and, his second wife, Sally (née Cornell) Clarkson (1762–1803). From his father's first marriage to Mary Rutherfurd (a daughter of Walter Rutherfurd and sister of U.S. Senator John Rutherfurd), he had one half-sister, Mary Rutherfurd Clarkson, who married her cousin Peter Augustus Jay (the eldest son of Chief Justice John Jay). His father was a Revolutionary War hero who served in the New York State Assembly and Senate and was the 6th President of the Bank of New York.

His paternal grandparents were David Clarkson (a direct descendant of the English born Puritan clergyman, the Rev. David Clarkson) and Elisabeth (née French) Clarkson (a direct descendant of Phillip French, the 27th Mayor of New York City) and his uncle, Thomas Streatfeild Clarkson, was the grandfather of Thomas S. Clarkson, the namesake of Clarkson University. His maternal grandparents were Samuel Cornell and Susan (née Mabson) Cornell.

== Career ==
Clarkson served as president of the New York Stock Exchange from 1837 until 1851 when he was succeeded by his vice president, Henry G. Stebbins (later a member of the U.S. House of Representatives from New York's 1st district). An earlier vice president under his presidency was Edward Prime, a son of Nathaniel Prime and partner in Prime, Ward & King. After his tenure as president of the Exchange, he was chosen as president of the Gallatin Fire Insurance Company, serving practically until his death in 1867.

Following in the footsteps of his father and grandfather, he served as a governor of the New York Hospital "so that for one complete century, from 1770, when the board organized, to 1870, the name was on the board."

== Personal life ==
On March 27, 1822, he was married to Elizabeth Streatfield Clarkson. Elizabeth, his cousin, was the daughter of Thomas Streatfeild Clarkson and Elizabeth (née Van Horne) Clarkson. Together, they were the parents of eleven children, including:

- Matthew Clarkson (1823–1913), who married Susan Matilda Jay, the youngest daughter of David's half-sister Mary and her husband Peter Augustus Jay, in 1852.
- Thomas Streatfeild Clarkson (1824–1902), who married Ann Mary Clarkson (1827–1910), a daughter of Thomas Streatfeild Clarkson and Elizabeth (née Clarkson) Clarkson.
- David Clarkson (1826–1904), "the eldest of five brothers who lived with their sister at the old family residence," 112 East 23rd Street.
- Augustus Vallete Clarkson (1829–1907), an Episcopal minister who served as Rector of the Church of St. Augustine in Croton, New York.
- Frederick Clarkson (1830–1901), a member of the Sons of the Revolution, the Society of Colonial Wars, the Society of Foreign Wars and was a supporter of the American Museum of Natural History.
- William Clarkson (1832–1895), who did not marry.
- Frances Selina Clarkson (1834–1835), who died in infancy.
- Augustus Levinus Clarkson (1835–1910), who did not marry.
- Robert Clarkson (1837–1849), who died young.
- Elizabeth Clarkson (1839–1856), who died young.
- Catherine Goodhue Clarkson (d. 1918), who lived at 16 West 48th Street and died unmarried in 1918.

Clarkson died on June 3, 1867.

Business positions
Preceded by R. D. Weeks	President of the New York Stock Exchange; 1837 – 1851	Succeeded by Henry G. Stebbins
