= Autumn de Forest =

American painter

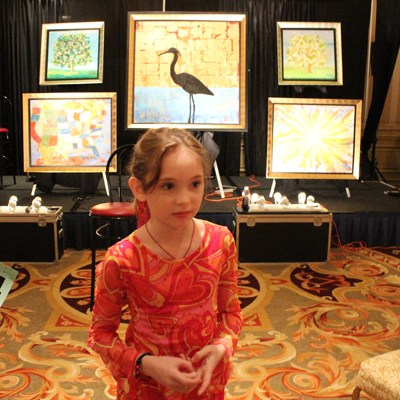
- De Forest at auction of her work and other artists at The Henry Hotel, Dearborn, Michigan
- Born: October 27, 2001 (age 25)
- Occupation: Painter
- Known for: Selling more than $100,000 in paintings at the age of eight
- Relatives: Lockwood de Forest (1850–1932); George de Forest Brush (1855–1941); Robert W. de Forest

Autumn de Forest (born October 27, 2001) is an American painter from Las Vegas, Nevada. The Discovery Channel referred to her as "an artistic genius" when she was eight years old. Members of the art community and other media outlets, such as the Huffington Post and Forbes, have referred to de Forest as a prodigy. Her paintings have sold for a total of $7 million.

== Personal life ==
De Forest lives in Las Vegas, Nevada, with her parents, Douglas de Forest and Katherine Olsen de Forest. Douglas is a musician and composer, and Katherine is a former actress and model. Autumn De Forest is the descendant of twentieth-century artists Lockwood de Forest (1850–1932), George de Forest Brush (1855–1941) and Roy Forest (1930–2007). She is also related to Robert W. de Forest, a former director of the Metropolitan Museum of Art in New York City.

== Beginnings ==
De Forest began experimenting with a paintbrush at the age of five when her father was staining wooden furniture. Given scrap wood at her request, de Forest painted a design that her parents felt surpassed the average child's artistic ability. De Forest's parents encouraged her, providing her with brushes, canvases and acrylic paint. The de Forests repurposed their music studio into an art studio. When she was seven years old, de Forest wanted to display her art. Her parents rented a space at the 2009 Boulder City Fine Arts Festival, where she received an honorable mention. A month later, de Forest won best of show in another Art in the Park event. After time, her parents obtained representation for her and her work, with Ben Valenty, a child-artist representative.

== Career growth ==
At the age of eight, de Forest sold more than $100,000 in paintings within 16 minutes at an auction in February 2010. One of her paintings was purchased for $25,000. After this event, the Discovery Health Channel included de Forest in a television special about child geniuses. She has appeared on local and major news networks throughout the U.S. including NBC's Today Show and The Wendy Williams Show. De Forest was commissioned by Disney to paint a series of Disney princesses. Time for Kids, a publication by Time Inc. written for school children, referred to de Forest as a modern master in an August 2013 print and online article about de Forest and her work.

In 2017, the Monthaven Arts and Cultural Center in Hendersonville, Tennessee, hosted a major solo exhibition for de Forest titled "Her White Room: The Art of Autumn de Forest."

That same year, de Forest was listed as one of Teen Vogue's "21 Under 21."

In 2018, de Forest was featured in the music video for the song "Youth" by best-selling recording artists Shawn Mendes and Khalid. The video calls out various exceptional young people, including de Forest, musicians Elias and Zion Phoenix, and drag queen Clawdeena.

== Technique and inspiration ==
De Forest paints with acrylic paint, oil paint and encaustic (melted wax) on canvas. Dreams, and other things she notices in passing and even commercials have provided inspiration for her painting. De Forest cites as inspiration Andy Warhol, Georgia O'Keeffe, Pablo Picasso, Grant Wood, Jackson Pollock, Jasper Johns and Henri Matisse, contributing to her assortment of styles.
