= Peter T. Curtenius =

American politician

Col. Peter T. Curtenius

New York State Auditor
- In office April 2, 1782 – March 15, 1797
- Governor: George Clinton; John Jay
- Preceded by: Comfort Sands
- Succeeded by: Samuel Jones

Personal details
- Born: Peter Theobaldus Curtenius; April 3, 1734; New York City, Province of New York
- Died: 1798; New York City, New York
- Resting place: Beechwoods Cemetery, New Rochelle, New York
- Spouse: Catharine Goelet (m. 1755)
- Children: 9
- Parent: Anthonius Curtenius
- Relatives: Peter Goelet (brother-in-law)

Peter Theobaldus Curtenius (April 3, 1734, in New York City – 1798 in New York City) was an American merchant and politician.

== Early life ==
Peter Theobaldus Curtenius was born on April 3, 1734, in New York City. He was the son of Rev. Anthonius Curtenius, a clergyman of the Dutch Church who had come from Holland to the United States.

== Career ==
In 1774, he was a member of the New York Committee of Correspondence. On May 31, 1775, the New York Provincial Congress appointed him Commissary General, with the rank of colonel, being in charge of the purchase of provisions for the Continental Army.

In 1782, after the resignation of merchant and banker Comfort Sands, he was appointed New York State Auditor, holding the post until the creation of the succeeding office of comptroller in 1797.

== Personal life ==
In August 1755, he married Catharine Goelet (died 1806), a sister of his partner Peter Goelet, and their children were:

- Elizabeth Curtenius (born 1757)
- Anthony Curtenius (born 1759)
- Catharine Curtenius Dunlap (born 1761)
- Gen. Peter Curtenius (1763–1817), who married Mary Anna Lasher (d. 1829)
- Janet Curtenius (born 1765)
- Philip Curtenius (born 1768)
- Jane Curtenius (1770–1846), who married Elbert Roosevelt (1767–1857), a grandson of Johannes Roosevelt.
- Mary Curtenius (born 1773)
- Anthony Washington Curtenius (born 1775).

He died from yellow fever in New York City, and was originally buried at the vault of the Middle Dutch Church on Cedar Street, but he and his son Peter's remains were re-interred in 1857 at the Beechwoods Cemetery in New Rochelle, New York.

=== Descendants ===
His son Peter as the Marshal of the City of New York in 1812 carried out a registration of "Alien Enemies", that is British people, of whom there were about 1500 in the city, following the outbreak of the War of 1812. His grandson, Clinton Roosevelt (1804–1898), was a politician and inventor.

== Sources ==
Political offices
Preceded by Comfort Sands as Auditor General	New York State Auditor; 1782–1797	Succeeded by Samuel Jones as Comptroller
