= Edward Prime =

American banker (1801–1883)

8th President of the New York Stock Exchange
- In office 1835–1836
- Preceded by: R. D. Weeks
- Succeeded by: R. D. Weeks

Personal details
- Born: December 10, 1801 New York City, U.S.
- Died: August 21, 1883 (aged 81) Riverdale-on-Hudson, New York, U.S.
- Spouses: Anne Bard (m. 1827; died 1834) Charlotte Wilkins Hoffman (m. 1836)
- Relations: Comfort Sands (grandfather); William Seton III (nephew)
- Parent(s): Nathaniel Prime; Cornelia Sands Prime
- Occupation: Banker

Edward Prime (December 10, 1801 – August 21, 1883) was an American banker who served as president of the New York Stock Exchange.

== Early life ==
Prime was born on December 10, 1801, at 54 Wall Street in New York City. He was the eldest son of Nathaniel Prime (1768–1840) and Cornelia (née Sands) Prime (1773–1852), who married in 1797. Among his sisters was Cornelia Prime (wife of Robert Ray, a brother-in-law of New York Gov. John Alsop King), Emily Prime (wife of U.S. Navy Capt. William Seton and a son of Elizabeth Ann Seton), Matilda Prime (wife of Gerard Holsman Coster), and Laura Prime (wife of John Clarkson Jay, a son of Peter A. Jay and grandson of John Jay).

His maternal grandparents were Comfort Sands, the merchant, banker and Continental Congressman, and Elizabeth (née Cornell) Sands. His paternal grandparents were Joshua Prime and Bridget (née Hammond) Prime.

Prime was educated at McCulluck's boarding school in Morristown, New Jersey, where his father and other family members were educated.

== Career ==
Five years before his birth, his father organized "Nathaniel Prime, Stock and Commission Broker" which made money buying and selling bank stocks before he opened his own private bank where he allowed customers to deposit money and then loaned it out. In 1808, his father brought Samuel Ward III in as a partner and the firm was renamed Prime & Ward, followed by his uncle Joseph Sands in 1816 when the firm became Prime, Ward & Sands. In 1824, the firm was again reorganized as Prime, Ward, Sands & King when James Gore King became a partner upon his return from England. After Sand's death in 1826, the firm became Prime, Ward & King.

In 1826, Prime entered the firm and was made a partner of Prime, Ward & Co. upon his father's retirement in 1832. His father, in ill health, committed suicide on November 26, 1840, by cutting his throat. The firm collapsed in 1847, and Prime established the firm of Prime & Co., which consisted of him and his four sons, where he worked until his retirement in 1867, at which point his sons also retired.

=== Philanthropy ===
Prime was one of the founders of the New York Eye and Ear Dispensary. He was also a vestryman in St. Philip's Church in Manhattan and a warden of Christ Church in Riverdale.

== Personal life ==
On September 18, 1827, he was married to Anne Bard (1804–1834). Anne was the daughter of William Bard, a lawyer who founded the New York Life Insurance and Trust Company. Anne's younger sister, Susan Bard, was the wife of Edward's first cousin, Ferdinand Sands, both being grandsons of Comfort Sands. Before his first wife's death in 1834, they were the parents of four children:

- Cornelia Prime (1829–1869), who married German-born August Ahrens (1818–1869) in 1850.
- Nathaniel Prime (1830–1885), a Brevet Lieutenant Colonel who died unmarried.
- William Bard Prime (1832–1836), who died in infancy.
- Edward Prime (b. 1833), who married Annie Rhodes Gilbert (1856–1941), the widow of his younger half-brother in 1889.

After the death of his first wife in New York City on October 27, 1834, he married Charlotte Wilkins Hoffman (1808–1892) in 1836.

- William Hoffman Prime (1837–1881), who married Anne Rhodes Gilbert in 1879.
- Charlotte Prime (1838-1923), who married Leonard J. Wyeth in 1858.
- Mary Catherine Prime (b. 1841), who married James A. Scrimper in 1868.
- Henry Prime (1847–1914).

An avid sportsman, he was said to have been the first to bring a pack of fox hounds to the United States, where he used to "hunt the fox in the woods of Long Island".

Prime died on August 21, 1883, in Riverdale-on-Hudson, New York. After a funeral at Christ Church in Riverdale, he was buried at Green-Wood Cemetery in Brooklyn.
