= William Seton =

William Seton may refer to:

- William Seton (writer) (1835–1905), American author, novelist and popular science writer
- William Seton, 1st Lord Seton (died 1410), Scottish noble
- William Seton of Kylesmure (1562–1635), Scottish landowner and postmaster
