= Clinton Roosevelt =

American politician

Member of the New York State Assembly for New York County
- In office January 1, 1837 – December 31, 1837

Personal details
- Born: November 3, 1804 New York City, United States
- Died: August 8, 1898 (aged 93) Fisher's Island, New York, United States
- Relations: See Roosevelt family Peter T. Curtenius (grandfather)
- Parent(s): Elbert Roosevelt; Jane Curtenius Roosevelt

Clinton Roosevelt (November 3, 1804 – August 8, 1898) was an American politician, lawyer, and inventor from New York. He was a member of the prominent Roosevelt family.

== Early life ==
Roosevelt was born in New York City on November 3, 1804, and raised in Pelham, New York, where he attended common school. He was a son of Elbert Roosevelt (1767–1857) and Jane (née Curtenius) Roosevelt (1770–1846). He had seven siblings, five of which were brothers: Peter Curtenius (1795–1891), Elbert Jones (1797–1885), Henry (1800–1848), the Rev. Washington (1802-), and Isaac (1812–1856). His sisters were Jane Eliza (1807–1892) and Mary (1810–1822). The site of the house he was born in was later occupied by the Standard Oil building in New York.

He later attended law school in New York and became prominent at the bar.

== Family ==
A member of the Roosevelt family, he was a great-grandson of Johannes Roosevelt, making him a distant cousin of U.S. Presidents Theodore and Franklin D. Roosevelt. His grandfather, Peter Roosevelt, was a Major in the Revolutionary Army.

He is also related to Presidents John Quincy Adams and Martin Van Buren. Through his maternal grandmother, Catharine Goelet Curtenius, wife of New York State Auditor Peter Theobaldus Curtenius, he was additionally a member of the Goelet family. His grandfather was partners in business with his grandmother's brother Peter Goelet.

== Career ==
=== Politics ===
Roosevelt was a founding member of the Locofocos, or Equal Rights Party, a radical faction of the Democratic Party. In 1836, he was elected to the New York State Assembly, 60th New York State Legislature, and served from 1837 to 1840. Roosevelt was an opponent of the monopoly banking system and cited bank paper currency as the cause of economic problems. After the Panic of 1837, when New York's economy worsened and the working population suffered, he changed his views, calling for a communist economic system with greater government involvement. At one point he served as Commissioner of Pensions.

On October 1, 1845, he delivered a speech to the World's Convention at Clinton Hall in New York, organized by Robert Owen.

Roosevelt was in Russia at the outbreak of the Crimean War (1853 to 1856) and was employed as a "diplomatic agent of the governments concerned," acting as the "herald who carried the official dispatches between St. Petersburg, Paris, Vienna, and Berlin."

In 1884, Roosevelt gave a "rambling talk" at the People's Hall about "bulls and bears, the Stock Exchange, national banks, over-speculation, specie and paper currency, and financial depression." He gave his last political speeches in the Tilden campaign.

In his middle age, Roosevelt retired from public life and devoted his efforts to the study of geology, economics, and other sciences. He later went on to write several books of his own.

=== Law ===
In 1885, Roosevelt filed a petition to the state legislature for the dissolution of the Trinity Church corporation on the grounds that its charter had been violated. He based his petition on the apparent fact that the property was no longer used for church purposes, that the Trinity pastors no longer preached orthodox Episcopalianism, and that the organization had become a "political society."

=== Invention ===
Roosevelt was also an inventor and an advocate of patent reform.

In the 1850s, he invented a warship design. He envisioned the building of a vessel sharp at both ends, "plating them with polished iron armor, with high bulwarks, and a sharp roof plated in like manner, with the design of glancing the balls. The means of defence are a torpedo, made to lower on nearing an enemy, and driven by a mortar into the enemy's side under water, where, by a fusee, it will explode."

Neither the United States nor Russia were interested. Charles Morris described the design as "a useless waste of labor," and "absurd," although admits "the torpedo idea, suggested by Roosevelt, has won its way remarkably since that date."

Roosevelt later proposed trade unions to increase the profits of inventors. In 1872 he was granted a patent for an "Improvement of Splice Pieces for Railway Rails."

=== Publishing ===
Roosevelt is the author and publisher of a wide variety of written works. He served as editor of the Locofoco paper, Democrat, when it began to appear in 1836.

Of his writings, Roosevelt is most well known for his 1841 book, The Science of Government, Founded on Natural Law. Only two copies of the original printing of this text are known to survive: one in the Library of Congress, Washington D.C. and another in the Harvard University Library.

Joshua Greenberg describes the reception of the book as "less than enthusiastic." Edgar Allan Poe wrote a severely critical review of the work for Graham's Magazine, objecting in particular to what he described as Roosevelt's "pompous" tone and writing. William T. Still described the book as being "the Luciferian doctrine in its purest form."

=== Controversy ===
Roosevelt has long been the center of speculation and conspiracy theory. Salem Kirban claimed that Clinton was a member of the "Colombian Lodge of the Order of the Illuminati," described as having been "established in New York City" in 1795. Kirban provides no source or substantiation.

== Personal life ==
Roosevelt had an office in New York City at 52 Exchange Place and lived at 411 West 23rd Street until his death.

He was a member of the Geographical Society, the New York Biographical Society, and the Metropolitan Museum of Art.

Roosevelt never married. He died on August 8, 1898, at his summer home on Fisher's Island, New York. His funeral was held at Christ Church in Pelham Manor, New York, and he was subsequently buried in Beechwoods Cemetery in New Rochelle, New York.

At his death, the New York Times described him as "the oldest member of the Pelham Manor branch of the family," and the New-York Observer recognized him as "the last of the older generation of the family of that name."

== Publications ==
=== Books ===
- The Mode of Protecting Domestic Industry, Consistently with the Desires Both of the North and the South, by Operating on the Currency. New York: McElrath and Bangs (1833); New York: B.H. Tyrrel (1889). 48 p. OCLC 940223422.
- The Science of Government, Founded on Natural Law. New York: Dean & Trevett (1841). 113 p. OCLC 1119062829.
  - Reprinted with commentary in 1955 by Emmanuel M. Josephson as Roosevelt's Communist Manifesto. New York: Cheney Press. 128 p. OCLC 896521361.

=== Articles ===
- "To the Inventors of the United States." Scientific American, vol. 2, no. 15 (January 2, 1847), p. 119. OCLC 7792725322. JSTOR 26133984.
- "To the Inventors of the United States." Scientific American, vol. 2, no. 16 (January 9, 1847), p. 123. OCLC 7792961207. JSTOR 26128029.
- "Declaration of the Principles of the Reformed Association of Inventors." Scientific Mechanic: Inventors' Advocate, Patent Office Reporter, and Expositor of Arts and Trades (February 5, 1848), p. 3.
- "Inventors Convention." Scientific American, vol. 4, no. 32 (April 28, 1849), p. 250. OCLC 7792796971. JSTOR 24929423.
- "On the Paradox of Political Economy in the Coexistence of Excessive Production and Excessive Population." Proceedings of the American Association for the Advancement of Science, 13th Meeting, August 1859 (Cambridge, 1860), pp. 344–352. OCLC 43547565.
- "Principia of Social Science." OCLC 43052674.
  - Republished in The Mode of Protecting Domestic Industries / The Science of Government Founded on Natural Law / Paradox of Political Economy (New York: B.H. Tyrrel, 1889), pp. 1–6.

=== Pamphlets ===
- Proposition of a New System of Political Economy, and a Party to Prevent the Threatened Civil War Between the North and South (New York: O. Halsted, 1832). 8 p. OCLC 41362554.
- The Political and Legal History of the Trinity Church Monopoly. No. 1. (New York: J.T. Crowell, 1848). 23 p. OCLC 909043.
- Charges and Argument Against Thomas Ewbank (1851)
- Introduction to the Universal Science (New York: C. Roosevelt, 1858). 24 p. OCLC 63171373.
- Opinions on the Rights of Conscience and of Property in Trinity Church to the King's Farm and Garden, and the Dominie Bogardus Bowery; and also, on the like rights in the Collegiate Reformed Dutch Church, to the trust estates of Steenwick and Harpending. (New York: C. Roosevelt, 1885). 40 p. OCLC 12675115.
- An open letter from the counsel of the late Rev. David Groesbeck to the general convention of the Protestant Episcopal church in the United States and British North America; by Clinton Roosevelt, of counsel in the case of Groesbeck vs. Dix and Dunscomb, as reported in the N.Y. 'Daily Transcript,' February 18, 1871. (New York: Evening Post Job Printing Office, 1889). 23 p. OCLC 82527192.

=== Collected works ===
- The Mode of Protecting Domestic Industries / The Science of Government Founded on Natural Law / Paradox of Political Economy. New York: Benjamin H. Tyrrel (1889). OCLC 940156079.

=== Patents ===
- "Improvement in Splice-Pieces for Railway Rails," Patent No. 124,856. US124856A. U.S. Patent Office (March 19, 1872)
