= Van Campen Taylor =

American architect

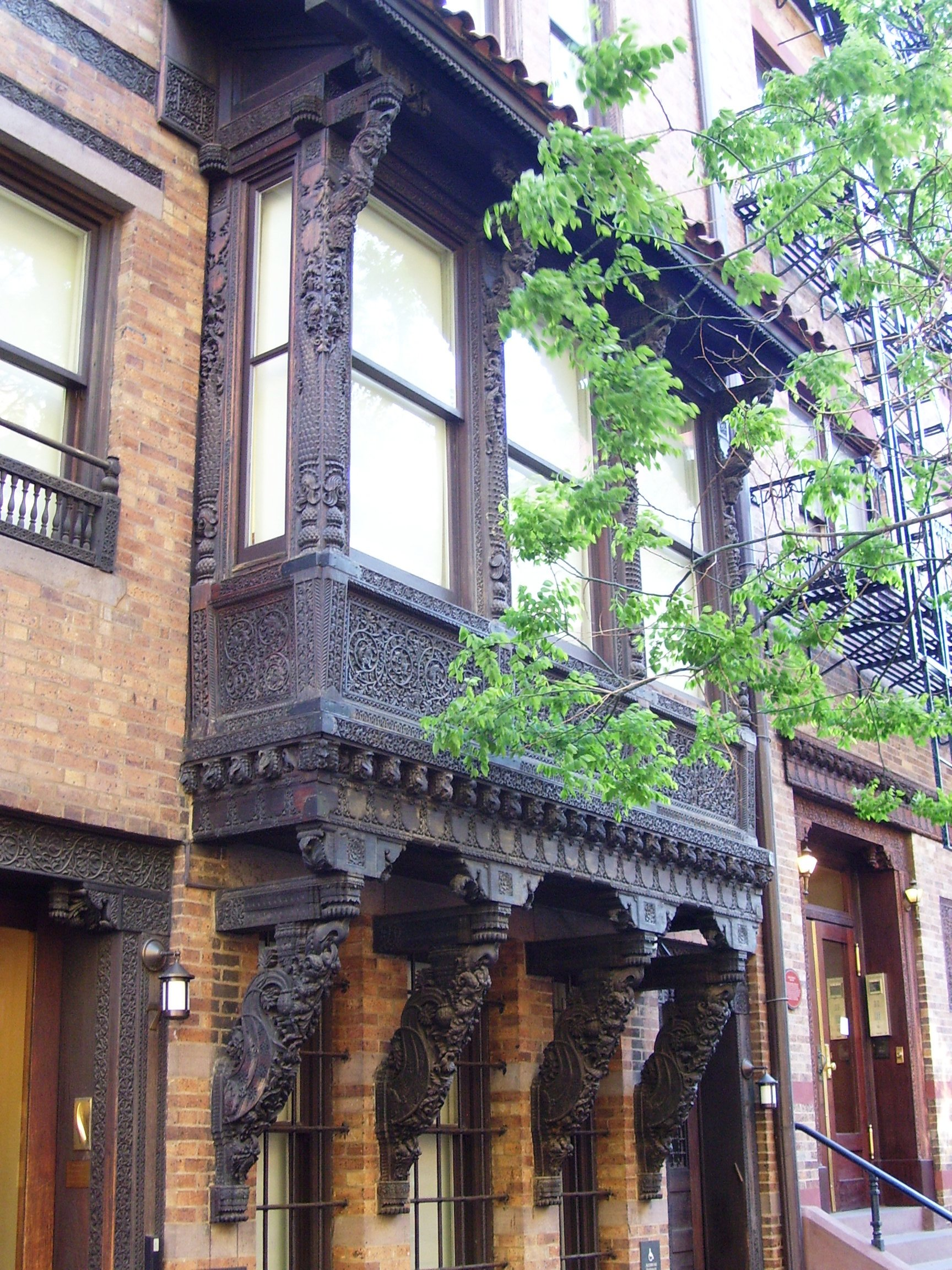
Detail of decorative teak work on the home Taylor designed for artist and shipping heir Lockwood De Forest in New York City.

Benjamin Van Campen Taylor (1846–1906) was a late nineteenth- and early twentieth-century American architect.

Taylor was graduated with a Bachelor of Arts (A.B.) degree from Rutgers College in New Brunswick, New Jersey in 1867.

== Buildings ==
- Winants Hall (1890) at Rutgers University's Queen's Campus, was the college's first dormitory building.
- A home built for decorative arts designer, landscape painter and shipping heir Lockwood de Forest (1887) in New York City’s Greenwich Village presently houses the Edgar M. Bronfman Center for Jewish Student Life at New York University.
- A home built for jewelry maker Charles L. Carrington (1885) in Newark, New Jersey.
