= Winants Hall =

- U.S. Historic district – Contributing property
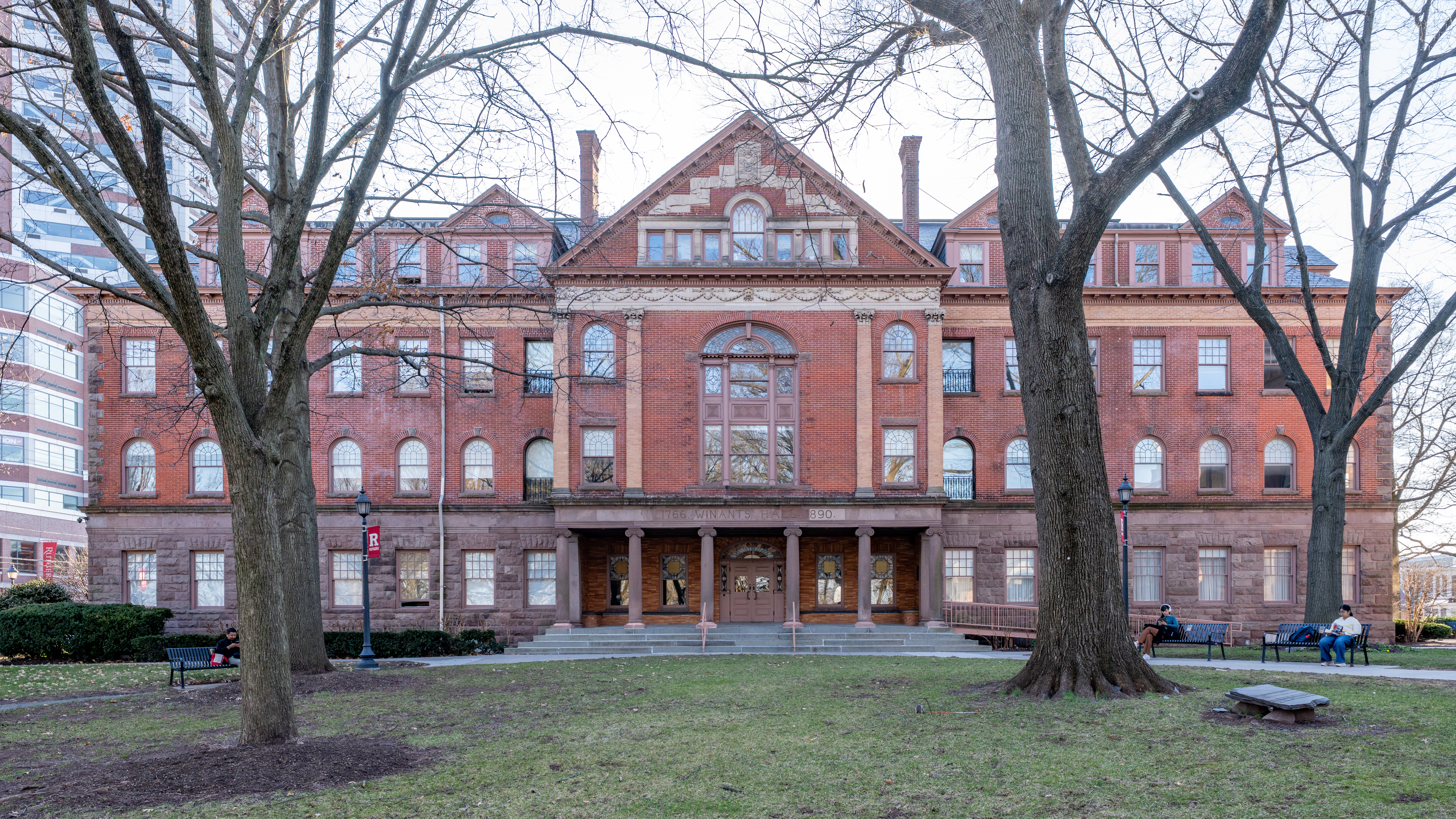

- Location within Middlesex County, New Jersey
- Location: 7 College Avenue; New Brunswick, New Jersey
- Coordinates: 40°29′54″N 74°26′48″W
- Built: 1890
- Architect: Van Campen Taylor
- Part of: Queens Campus, Rutgers University (ID73001113)
- Designated CP: July 2, 1973

Winants Hall is a historic educational building located on the Queens Campus of Rutgers University in New Brunswick, New Jersey. Designed by Van Campen Taylor and completed in 1890, Winants Hall is the oldest dormitory building at Rutgers University, known then as Rutgers College. The building was a gift to the university from Board of Trustees member and Bayonne businessman, Garrett E. Winants, and cost $75,000. The construction of the dormitory satisfied many long-awaited needs of the college. The new residential system also fostered a thriving social atmosphere for students, staff, and guests as it served as a student dormitory from 1890 to 1947.

It is a contributing property in the Queens Campus, Rutgers University Historic District, which was added to the National Register of Historic Places on July 2, 1973.

== History ==
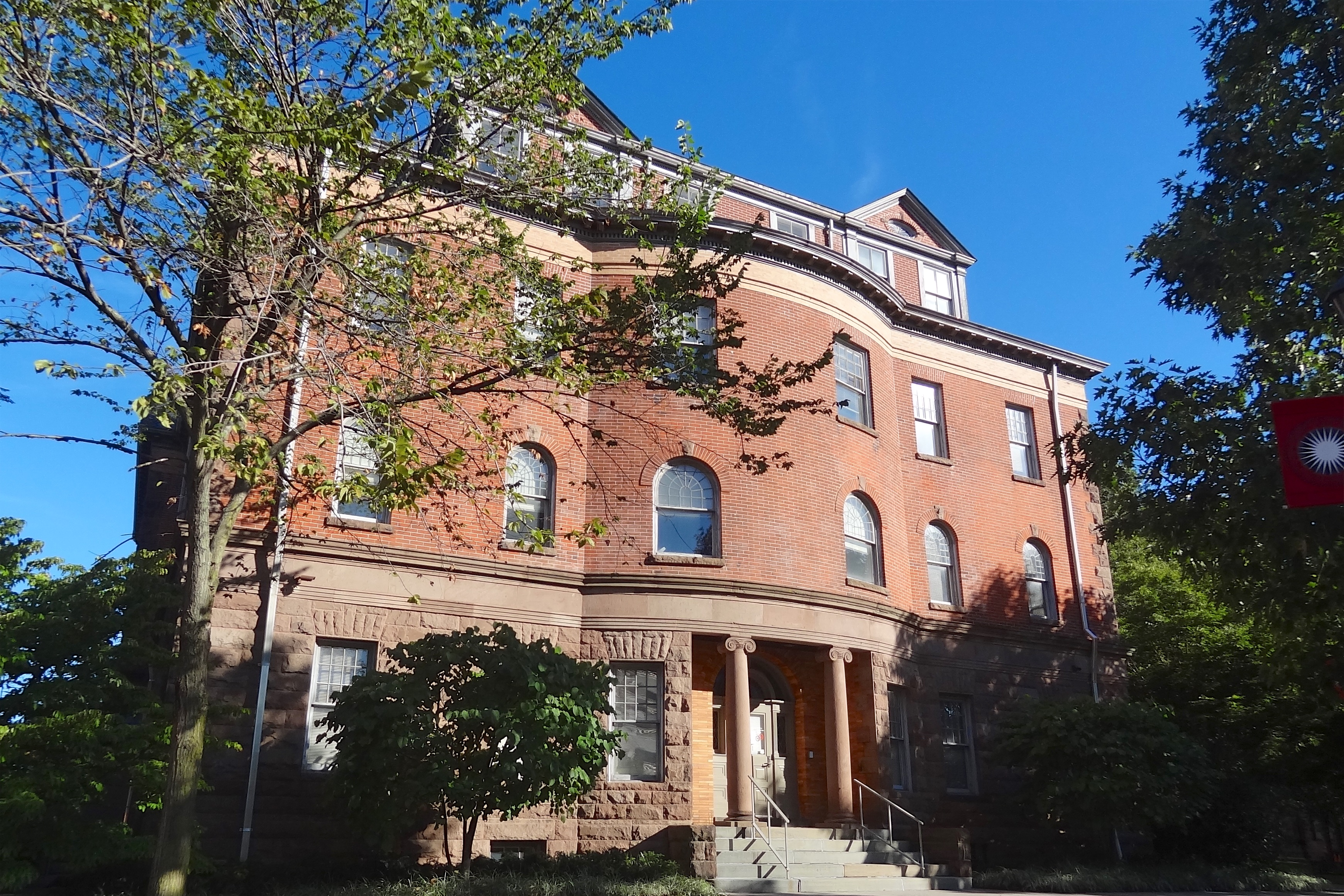
View from Somerset Street.

When Garrett E. Winants donated money to Rutgers College for the creation of its first dormitory, he stipulated that the building expressly be used “only by the students of Rutgers College...and be kept in good and reasonable repair at the expense of said college.” The cornerstone was laid by Winants on June 18, 1889 during a celebration of faculty and students. By September 1890, the building was completed and provided accommodations for about 85 students. Rooms were chosen by students on the basis of seniority, with the older students getting first pick. The students paid rent in advance before the start of the semester. In 1896, Amanda Winants, the wife of Garrett E. Winants, donated an extra $10,000 “for the sole purpose of keeping in repair the building known as Winants Hall.”

Previous to the construction of Winants Hall, Rutgers men had been living in boarding houses, commuting, or living in fraternity houses. Rutgers students had been begging for a long time to have a central living location on campus and their wishes were finally met by Winants. William H. S. Demarest, president of Rutgers College, describes the issue of housing in his History of Rutgers, “It was the first full answer to the dormitory appeal which had repeatedly expressed itself for sixty years…” Having a central residence was so important to students and changed the way students saw and experienced college. Demarest states, “It marked innovation in the order of Rutgers College life.” The move to have dorms on campus was described as, “‘an incentive to increased work ...and loyalty to alma mater.’ Students were thrilled to have a home of their own. That year they dedicated the Scarlet Letter yearbook to Mr. Winants “‘with the love of all Rutgers.’” Some of the students, those who were not already in fraternities, were clearly very excited to have a new community to be a part of.

A Targum article from 1924 describes what living in Winants Hall was like. According to the article, the students had water fights and there was the “throwing of everything from bags of water and door-loads of snow to bureaus and armchairs. These articles are generally projected from the third and fourth floors, and the law of gravity, the only law which has always been respected in Winants, takes effect.” Winants had its own culture which was shared by many of the men who attended Rutgers. It was a place for them to connect with each other beyond just the classroom setting. The Targum article states, “It is probably safe to say that Winants had had more influence on the men who have gone through Rutgers College with it as their home than any other building on campus. Winants men are always Rutgers men, in every sense of the word…” The construction of the residence hall helped push Rutgers to be a more social school. Winants Hall served as a quasi-student center when Rutgers College had not yet constructed one. Winants Hall served as an area for hosting guests, celebrations, alumni dinners, football team dinners, and meetings for various associations, including the college YMCA.

The donation of Winants Hall came at a pivotal time for the university. Since its founding in 1766 by the Dutch Reformed Church, the college struggled with funding issues and low attendance rates, even closing its doors from 1794 to 1807 and again from 1816 to 1825. In 1825, Rutgers College, having sold its property to the church, came under its control to survive as an institution and even though it survived, attendance rates continued to drop until the late 1850s. During this difficult time, “The public displayed great apathy toward the college, and the trustees placed the blame on the aging faculty.” The trustees led the college into major reforms such as the overhaul of faculty and improvement in facilities. Attendance to the college increased in the latter half of the nineteenth century.

A major reason for the college's rapid growth in the second half of the nineteenth century was the passing of the Morrill Land-Grant Act of 1862. This Act offered federal land to each state to be given to a college where instruction would be offered in agriculture and the mechanic arts. In 1864, the land grant for New Jersey was awarded to the newly formed Scientific School of Rutgers College. This grant and following grants provided the impetus for Rutgers to become a “substantial, academically oriented, increasingly secular, financially secure, multipurpose college” under President Campbell. President Merrill Edward Gates continued this modernizing mission in a campaign to raise academic standards and improve student discipline. By the 1890s, this growing and modernizing institution desperately needed a modern residential system for students which Winants Hall provided.

=== Building's Evolution ===
The interior of the building has been altered many times to adapt to the university's needs. When it was first completed in 1890, the first floor of the building consisted of a dining room, assembly room and student suites, each containing two bedrooms and a study room. The second and third floors held more suites and the fourth floor contained suites, the kitchen, laundry, and employee's apartments. The dormitory housed about 85 students. In 1909, the dining hall was improved and in 1911 and 1915, the building was re-furnished and plumbing improved. Winants would serve as Rutgers College's sole dormitory until 1915 when Ford Hall was built on the Voorhees Mall along College Avenue. By 1915, suites on the first floor were turned into offices for the college YMCA. In the summer of 1920, Winants Hall served as the residence for students completing the first ever summer session at Rutgers. Later in 1925, the new Industrial Extension Division, a program to teach practical and technical skills to public utility employees and headed by Professor Miller, moved its offices into Winants Hall and eventually expanded so that in 1929, its offices extended over the south end of the first and second floors of the building. The building continued to serve a dual function as a student dormitory and office space until 1947 when Rutgers University fully converted Winants Hall into an academic and administrative facility.

The biggest alteration to Winants Hall came in 1990 with a campaign to reconfigure the building for its centennial. The $9.6 million (in 1990 dollars) restoration project's goal was to create a new administrative center in the building. The campaign proposed that the building would be adapted to serve as an assembly area for Rutgers’ Board of Governors, Board of Trustees, and Board of Overseers. It would also serve as an alumni center and office for various administrative departments. During this project headed by the Hillier Group, the building was gutted and braced with a new steel frame. Even the windows were rebuilt. On the exterior, the Hillier Group reconstructed the cornices and cleaned and restored the stone banding and stained glass windows. In the interior, they restored four Roman brick fireplaces, the marble floor, and the four-story oak staircase. Fire stairs and an elevator were added and rooms were adapted for office use. Recently, Winants Hall was renovated again in 2017 and 2018. The building currently serves the university as an administrative building.
