= Montague Castle =

Canadian-born American stained glass artist (1939–1867)

- Born: April 8, 1867; Montreal, Quebec, Canada
- Died: August 11, 1939 (aged 72); New Rochelle, New York, U.S.
- Burial place: Beechwoods Cemetery, New Rochelle, New York, U.S.
- Education: Art Students League of New York
- Occupations: Stained glass artist, businessperson, painter
- Spouse: Louise Griffin (m. 1897–)

Montague Castle (April 8, 1867 – August 11, 1939) was a Canadian-born American stained glass artist, businessperson, and painter. He maintained Montague Castle Stained Glass Studio in New York City, and the Montague Castle-London Company of New York, and he created stained glass for many of the churches and synagogues.

== Life and career ==
Montague Castle was born on April 8, 1939, in Montreal in Quebec, Canada. His father William Castle was an interior designer, and stained glass artist.

He moved at the age of 21 to New York City and enrolled at the Art Students League of New York, followed by six years of studied of art in Paris.

In Paris, Castle became interested in portrait painting, and when he returned to New York City he taught at the Art Students League of New York. By 1897, Castle stopped painting to focused exclusively on stained glass, and opened his own stained glass studio, Montague Castle Stained Glass Studio. Castle created stained glass for many churches and synagogues, including at Temple Emanu-El of New York; Temple Beth Israel in Hartford, Connecticut; Central Park United Methodist Church in Buffalo, New York; and National City Christian Church in Washington, D.C.. He also worked alongside Tiffany Studios of New York City.

He died at age 72 on August 11, 1939, in his house in New Rochelle, New York after suffering from a long illness.
