= Robert Charles Sands =

American writer and poet

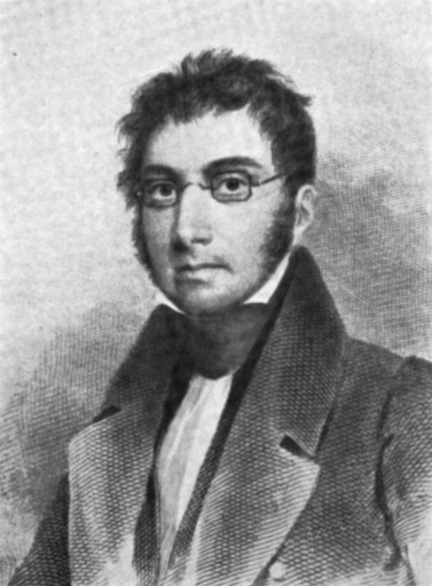
- Born: May 11, 1799; Brooklyn, New York
- Died: December 16, 1832 (aged 33); Hoboken, New Jersey
- Occupation: Writer
- Father: Comfort Sands

Robert Charles Sands (May 11, 1799 – December 16, 1832) was an American writer and poet.

== Biography ==
Robert Charles Sands was born in Brooklyn, New York on May 11, 1799, the son of Auditor-General Comfort Sands (1748–1834) and his second wife, Cornelia Lott Sands (1761-1856). He was a scholar and a writer of many literary types, but without much originality. His best work is considered to be in his short stories. His most well-known poem is Yamoyden which is an Indian story written in collaboration with a friend. He is considered part of the "Knickerbocker group", which also included Washington Irving, William Cullen Bryant, James Kirke Paulding, Gulian Crommelin Verplanck, Fitz-Greene Halleck, Joseph Rodman Drake, Lydia M. Child, and Nathaniel Parker Willis.

He died in Hoboken, New Jersey on December 16, 1832.
