= Robert Doughty Weeks =

American banker

President of the New York Stock Exchange
- In office 1834–1835
- Preceded by: Edward Prime
- Succeeded by: David Clarkson
- In office 1836–1837
- Preceded by: John Ward
- Succeeded by: Edward Prime

Personal details
- Born: July 8, 1795 Oyster Bay, New York, U.S.
- Died: June 16, 1854 (aged 58) Oyster Bay, New York, U.S.
- Spouses: Julia Hall Brasher (m. 1819; died 1828) Harriet Thompson Strong (m. 1832)
- Relations: Henry DeForest (grandson); Robert W. DeForest (grandson); Louis Seabury Weeks (grandson)

Robert Doughty Weeks (July 8, 1795 – June 16, 1854) was an American banker who was a founder and president of the New York Stock Exchange.

== Early life ==
Weeks was born on July 8, 1795, in Oyster Bay, New York. He was a son of James Huggins Weeks of Cove Hill in Oyster Bay and Miriam (née Doughty) Weeks (1765–1854).

His maternal grandparents were Elizabeth and Charles Doughty, and his paternal grandparents were Jotham Weeks and Sarah (née Huggins) Weeks.

== Career ==
A found and member of the New York Stock Exchange, Weeks served as president of the Exchange twice, first from 1834 to 1835 (when he was succeeded by Edward Prime), and second from 1836 to 1837, when he was succeeded by David Clarkson.

== Personal life ==
Weeks married twice. He married his first wife, Julia Hall Brasher (1802–1828), a daughter of Gasherie Brasher, on January 14, 1819. Together, they were the parents of:

- John Abeel Weeks (1820–1900), who married Alice Hathaway Delano, a distant cousin of Franklin D. Roosevelt, in 1849.
- Julia Mary Weeks (1827–1896), who married Henry Grant DeForest.

After her death, Weeks was married to Harriet Thompson Strong (1801–1864), a daughter of Benjamin Franklin Strong and Sarah (née Weeks) Strong, in 1832. Together, they were the parents of:

- Sarah Strong Weeks (1833–1863), who married Edwin Carnes.
- Benjamin Strong Weeks (1834–1902)
- James Weeks (1836–1921), who married Kezia Seabury.
- Francis H. Weeks (1844–1913)

Weeks died on June 16, 1854, in Oyster Bay, New York.

=== Descendants ===
Through his eldest son John, he was a grandfather of Sarah Carnes Weeks (1863–1956), the first wife of Francis L. V. Hoppin, an architect and artist.

Through his son James, he was a grandfather of Louis Seabury Weeks (1881-1971), an architect who designed buildings for International Telephone & Telegraph in Madrid (Telefónica Building), Bucarest (Telephones Company Building), and New York (75 Broad Street).

Through his daughter Julia, he was a grandfather of Henry Wheeler DeForest (1855–1938), who became a railroad executive, capitalist and industrialist, and Robert Weeks DeForest (1848–1931), a lawyer, financier, and philanthropist. Weeks was buried at Green-Wood Cemetery in Brooklyn.
