= Darius Miller (railroad executive) =

American railroad executive

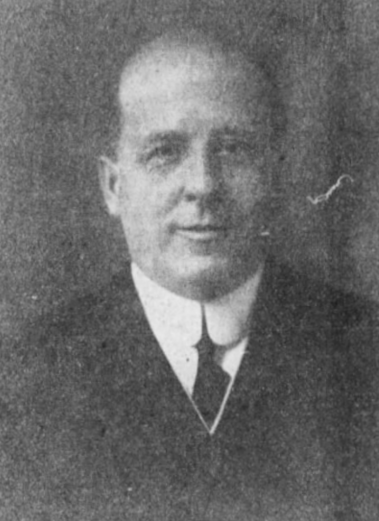
- Born: April 3, 1859; Princeton, Illinois, US
- Died: August 24, 1914 (aged 55); Glacier Park, Montana, US
- Occupation: Railroad executive

Darius Miller (April 3, 1859 – August 24, 1914) was president of the Chicago, Burlington and Quincy Railroad and Colorado and Southern Railway.

== Early life and family ==
Darius Miller was born in 1859 in Princeton, Illinois, the son of John S. and Elizabeth H. Miller. He was educated in his home town; in 1882, he married Sue C. Brown of Morris, Illinois.

In 1910, Miller and his wife Sue were living in Chicago. Thorndale Manor, which was designed by Howard Van Doren Shaw and built in Lake Forest, Illinois, in 1916, was originally built for Miller. The home was owned from the 1940s until 2001 by the family of Ronald P. Boardman.

== Railroad career ==
Miller's railroad career began in 1877, at the age of 18, as a stenographer for the Michigan Central Railroad. In 1880 he changed jobs to be a clerk for the St. Louis, Iron Mountain and Southern Railway in that company's freight office. He was promoted in 1881 to be chief clerk to the general manager, holding this position for two years. Miller changed jobs again in 1883 to become the general freight and ticket agent for the Memphis and Little Rock Railroad; he held that position until 1887 when he was promoted to general freight and passenger agent. Two years later in 1889, Miller became the traffic manager for the St. Louis, Arkansas and Texas Railroad. Miller made another change in 1890 to become traffic manager for the Queen and Crescent Road, holding that position until late 1893. At that time he was appointed as traffic manager for the Missouri–Kansas–Texas Railroad (MKT); he was promoted to vice president in November 1896. In October 1898 he left the MKT to become second vice president of Great Northern Railway, serving in that position until 1902 when he became first vice president of the Chicago, Burlington and Quincy Railroad (CB&Q). He was appointed president of both the CB&Q (succeeding George Harris) and the Colorado and Southern Railway in 1910.

In 1913 Miller drafted sample legislation against trespassing on railroad property, which he then submitted to the governors and railroad commissions of the states through which the CB&Q operated. Miller cited a total of 51,083 deaths following trespassing on railroad property in 1911 as part of the reasoning behind the sample legislation; he proposed fines ranging from $10 to $100 or jail terms of up to 30 days per infraction.

After his death in 1914, Miller was succeeded as president by Hale Holden.

== Death and burial ==
While on a vacation at Glacier Park, Montana, with his wife Sue, Darius Miller reportedly collapsed on August 22 from what was soon revealed to be appendicitis. Special emergency trains carrying physicians, railroad officials and family members were dispatched from St. Paul, Seattle and Great Falls, Montana, and Miller received an operation to treat the condition on August 23, but Miller died from the original injury on Sunday, August 24, 1914.

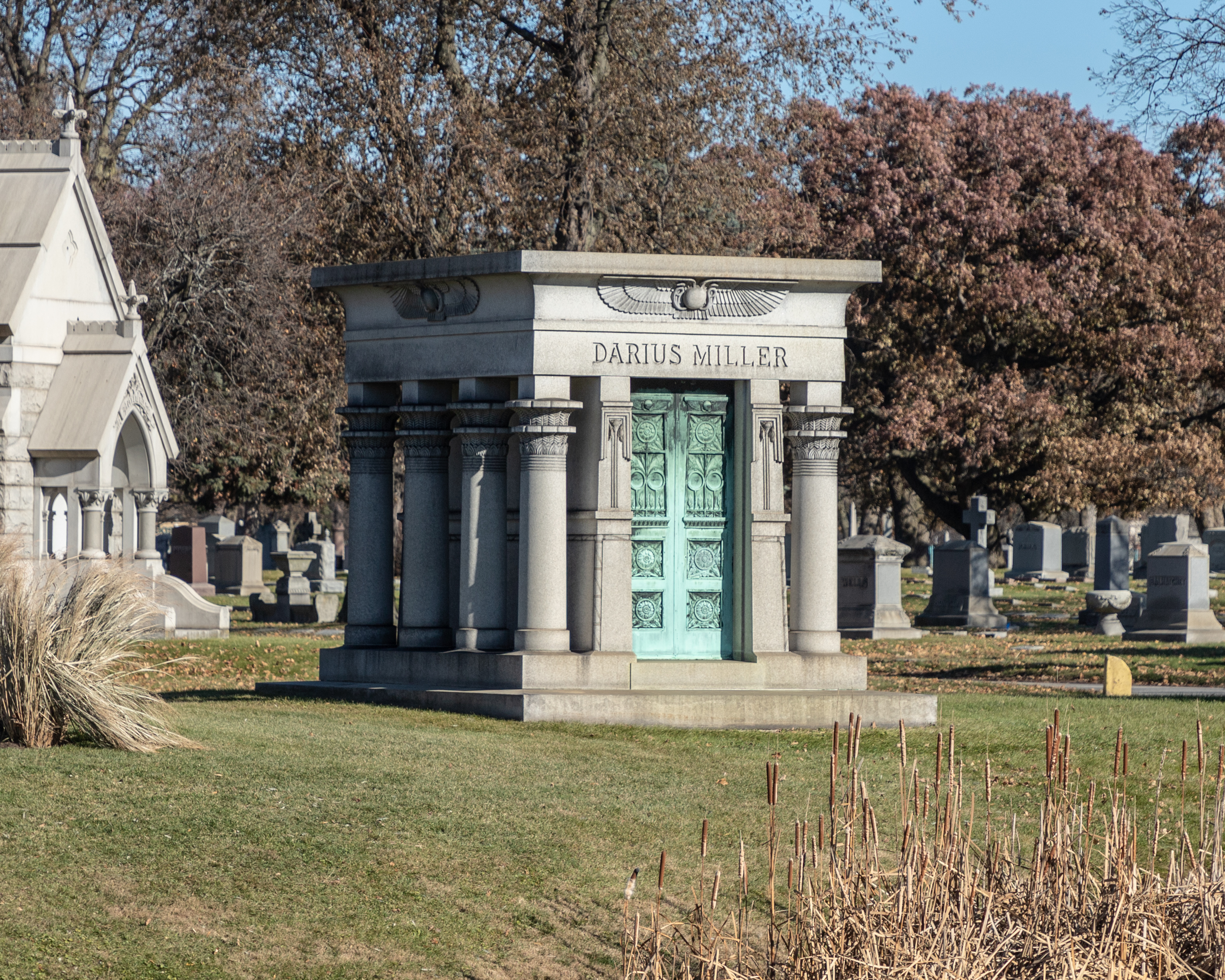
Miller's mauseoleum at Rosehill Cemetery

His funeral was held on August 27, 1914, with a large number of railroad presidents and prominent Chicago businessmen serving as honorary pallbearers. These included:

A. F. Banks, W. G. Bierd, J. H. Carroll, E. F. Carry, W. P. Clough, A. J. Earling, Howard Elliott, Samuel Morse Felton, Jr., Samuel W. Fordyce, W. A. Garnder, Jule Murat Hannaford, George Harris, James J. Hill, Louis W. Hill, W. V. Keeley, J. W. Kisen, George E. Marey, C. H. Markham, J. J. Mitchell, J. R. Morron, R. U. Mudge, A. D. Parker, Charles Elliott Perkins, Jr., J. W. Peyton, F. H. Rawson, G. M. Reynolds, Edward Payson Ripley, T. Schumacker, John G. Shedd, S. C. Scotten, O. N. Spencer, J. B. Terbell, J. J. Turner, Frederick Douglas Underwood, Daniel Willard and B. M. Winchell

The active pallbearers were all executives of the CB&Q.

Miller was interred in an Egyptian Revival-style mausoleum at Rosehill Cemetery. Although some websites include him as part of the expedition that opened King Tut's tomb, his death in 1914 and the date of the tomb discovery in 1922 would disprove this assertion.

In honor of Miller, CB&Q officials donated land in Princeton, Illinois, where Miller was born and raised, to the city of Princeton; the land formed the basis of Darius Miller Park. The park is adjacent to the current Princeton station served by Amtrak.

Business positions
Preceded by George Harris	President of Chicago, Burlington and Quincy Railroad; 1910 – 1914	Succeeded by Hale Holden
