= Henry deForest =

American businessman (1855–1938)

- Born: October 29, 1855; New York City, U.S.
- Died: May 28, 1938; Cold Spring Harbor, New York, U.S.
- Education: Williston Seminary; Yale University; Columbia Law School
- Spouse: Julia Gilman Noyes (m. 1898)
- Relatives: Robert W. DeForest (brother); Lockwood de Forest (brother); Edie Sedgwick (granddaughter)

Henry Wheeler DeForest (October 29, 1855 – May 28, 1938) was an American railroad executive, capitalist and industrialist.

== Early life ==
DeForest was born in New York City on October 29, 1855. He was a son of Henry Grant DeForest and Julia Mary (née Weeks) DeForest. Among his siblings was older brothers Lockwood DeForest, a painter and interior designer, and Robert Weeks DeForest, a lawyer, financier, and philanthropist.

DeForest paternal grandfather was Lockwood DeForest, a prominent South Street merchant and direct descendant of Jessé de Forest, of French Huguenot ancestry, whose Dutch West India Company helped to settle New Amsterdam. Through his mother, he was distantly related to Frederic Church, the Hudson River landscapist, and his maternal grandfather was Robert Doughty Weeks, the first President of the New York Stock Exchange.

He was a graduate of Williston Seminary in Easthampton, Massachusetts, Yale University in 1876, and Columbia Law School in 1878.

== Career ==
After being admitted to the bar in 1878, he began practicing law with his father, brother, and uncle in New York. When that firm was dissolved in 1893, DeForest and his brother founded the firm known as DeForest Brothers. From 1925 to 1928, he was chair of the executive committee of the Southern Pacific Railroad, and chairman of its board of directors from 1929 to 1932.

He assisted E.H. Harriman in the recapitalization of the Wells Fargo Express Company, and was a longtime director of the Equitable Life Assurance Company. With Elihu Root, he was the trustee of the majority of the Equitable's capital stock. He also served as president of the New York Botanical Garden from January 1928 to November 1937.

== Personal life ==
On August 22, 1898, DeForest was married to Julia Gilman Noyes (1875–1967) in St. Paul, Minnesota. Julia was the daughter of Emily Hoffman (née Gilman) Noyes and Charles Phelps Noyes, a millionaire druggist. Together, they resided at 63 East 79th Street in New York, Nethermuir in Cold Spring Harbor (the former home of Chinese merchant Oliver Kimball Gordon), and were the parents of:

- Julia Mary DeForest (1899–1988), who married Beverley Duer (1893–1961).
- Henry Wheeler DeForest Jr. (1901–1913), who died of a brain tumor in 1913.
- Charles Noyes DeForest (1905–1929), a Yale graduate who died in Palermo, Italy during a trip around the world.
- Alice Delano DeForest (1908–1988), who married Francis Minturn Sedgwick (1904–1967), son of Henry Dwight Sedgwick, in 1929.

DeForest died at his county home, Nethermuir, in Cold Spring Harbor on 1938. He was buried at Memorial Cemetery of Saint John's Church in Laurel Hollow, New York on Long Island.

=== Descendants ===
Through his daughter Alice, he is the grandfather of Andy Warhol's muse Edie Sedgwick.

Business positions
Preceded by Julius Kruttschnitt	Chairman of the Southern Pacific; Railroad Executive Committee; 1925–1928	Succeeded by Hale Holden
Preceded by None	Chairman of the Southern Pacific; Railroad Board of Directors; 1929–1932	Succeeded by Hale Holden
