= Comfort Sands =

American politician (1748–1834)

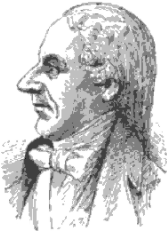

Member of the New York State Assembly from New York County
- In office 1784-85, 1788 and 1788-89

New York State Auditor General
- In office 1776–1782
- Preceded by: Office created
- Succeeded by: Peter T. Curtenius

Personal details
- Born: February 26, 1748 Cow Neck, Long Island, British America
- Died: September 22, 1834 (aged 86) Hoboken, New Jersey, U.S.
- Spouses: Sarah Dodge (m. 1769; died 1795) Cornelia Lott (after 1795)
- Relations: Joshua Sands (brother)
- Children: 18, including Robert
- Parent(s): John Sands; Elizabeth Cornwell Sands

Comfort Sands (February 26, 1748 – September 22, 1834) was an American merchant, banker and politician.

== Life ==
Comfort Sands was born in Cow Neck, Long Island on February 26, 1748. He was one of eight children born to John Sands (1708–1760) and Elizabeth (née Cornwell) Sands (1711–1782), who also descended from one of the three original families who owned Cow Neck. Sands and his siblings received limited schooling. His older brothers included John Sands (1737–1811), who served as a colonel during the Revolutionary War and was also a member of the New York State Assembly for Queens County, and Joshua Sands, a U.S. Representative.

=== Family ===
The Sands family was one of the original three families that settled in and owned what is now Sands Point, New York. Born in Reading, Berkshire, England, James Sands (d. 1695) immigrated to Plymouth, MA with his wife Sarah and their children, circa 1658. Along with several other men, James Sands obtained what is now Block Island, Rhode Island from the original inhabitants of the island, the Narragansetts, in 1660. In 1661, Sands sailed from Taunton, MA and moved his family to Block Island and had six children.

== Career ==
While still in his teens, Comfort left Long Island for Manhattan to work as a clerk. Sands worked at several positions including at Joseph Decker's store that was located on Peck Slip in lower Manhattan. Around 1769, Comfort opened his own store and by 1776, he had become a wealthy merchant.

During the American Revolutionary War, Comfort was a member of the New York Provincial Congress and was appointed as the first New York State Auditor-General (now known as the New York State Comptroller) in 1776. He served in this position until his resignation in 1782.

In 1783, Sands and his brother Joshua formed a business partnership dealing in foreign trade and land speculation. Their partnership included real estate ventures and a rope making manufacturing business in Brooklyn. In 1784, the Sands brothers purchased 160 acres of land along the Brooklyn waterfront for $12,000. They acquired the land, originally owned by the Rapelje family (also spelled Rapelye), early Dutch settlers of Brooklyn, under the 1779 New York State "Act for the Forfeiture and Sale of the Estates of Persons who Have Adhered to the Enemies of this State." The land acquired in the purchase included what is now the location of the Brooklyn Navy Yard (previously the New York Naval Shipyard), as well as the DUMBO and Vinegar Hill neighborhoods bordering the East River in Brooklyn. The waterfront area was to be the site of a new, planned community, called Olympia. It was to be divided into both commercial and residential properties and would be connected to Manhattan via the nearby ferry service. Though the land was surveyed, Olympia was never completed.

In 1784, he was one of the founders and became one of the first directors of the Bank of New York at its incorporation, the oldest bank in the United States. He was a member of the New York State Assembly from New York County in 1784–85, 1788 and 1788–89. He was President of the New York Chamber of Commerce from 1794 to 1798.

== Personal life ==
Comfort Sands married twice and had 18 children, 15 of whom were born to his first wife Sarah and three born to his second wife Cornelia. In 1769, he married Sarah Dodge (1749–1795) of Hunts Point in Westchester County, N.Y. (now part of the Bronx).

- Joseph Sands (1772–1825), a banker with Prime, Ward & King who married Maria Theresa Kampfel (1782–1846)
- Cornelia Sands (1773–1852), who married Nathaniel Prime (1768–1840), the banker.
- Richardson Sands (1783–1806)

After the death of Sarah, Comfort married Cornelia Lott (1761–1856), daughter of Abraham Lott of Brooklyn. Their children included:

- Robert Charles Sands (1799–1832), a noted poet.

In 1825, Comfort and Cornelia Sands moved to Hoboken, N.J. where he died on September 22, 1834.

=== Descendants ===
Through his daughter Cornelia, he was the great-grandfather of Cornelia Ray (1829–1867), who married Gen. Schuyler Hamilton (1822–1903), a grandson of Alexander Hamilton; Robert Ray (1832–1860), and Nathalie Elizabeth Ray (1837–1912), who married Edmund Lincoln Baylies (1829–1869), the parents of Edmund L. Baylies Jr.

Political offices
Preceded by (none)	New York State Auditor General; 1776–1782	Succeeded by Peter T. Curtenius as Auditor
