= Hale Holden =

American railroad executive

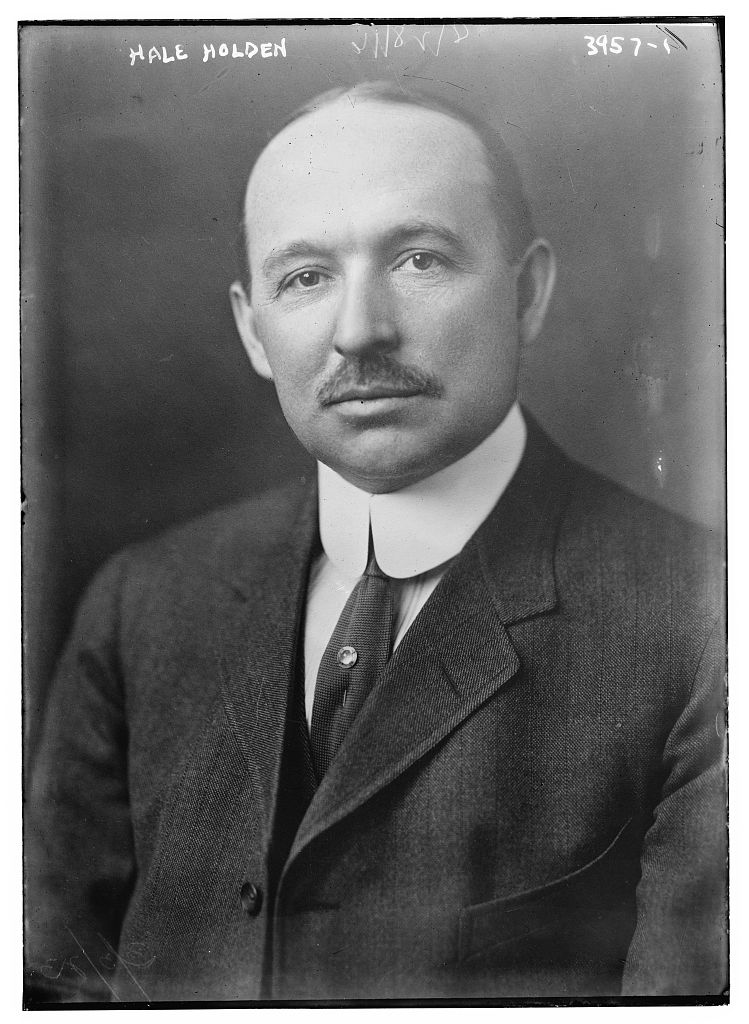
- Holden circa 1915
- Born: August 11, 1869; Kansas City, Missouri
- Died: September 23, 1940 (aged 71); New York City
- Occupation: railroad executive

Hale Holden (August 11, 1869 – September 23, 1940) was president of the Chicago, Burlington and Quincy Railroad (CB&Q) from 1914 to 1918 and 1920 to 1929, and chairman of the board of directors for Southern Pacific Railroad from 1932 to 1939. He was one of the lawyers working for James J. Hill's defense team in the Minnesota Rate Cases. In later years he served as a director for a number of large companies including American Telephone & Telegraph, New York Life Insurance Company and the Chemical Bank & Trust.

== Early life ==
Hale Holden was born on August 11, 1869, in Kansas City, Missouri, the son of Howard Malcomb and Mary Finley (Oburn) Holden. He received his education at Williams College (graduated 1890) and Harvard Law School (entered September 22, 1890; left 1892). Although he graduated from Williams College, he was forced to withdraw from Harvard due to family finances.

== Career ==
Holden practiced law as a partner in Dean, McLeod & Holden in Kansas City; it was his work in this company as a local attorney for the Great Northern Railway during the Minnesota Rate Cases before the Supreme Court that influenced James J. Hill in his favor.

=== Railroad career ===
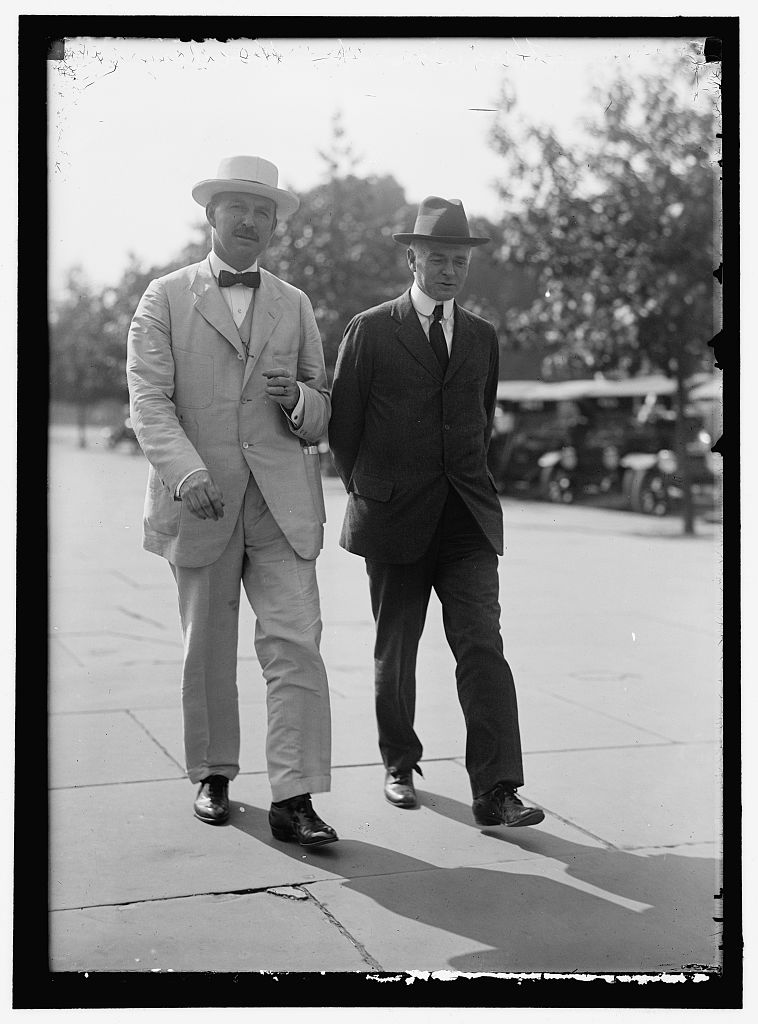
Hale Holden (left) and Fairfax Harrison, who was president of Southern Railway and an executive with the American Railway Association, in 1917.

In 1907, Holden left private law practice to become the general attorney for CB&Q, where his first assignments were to manage the railroad's interstate commerce litigation. 1910 saw a number of changes to the CB&Q leadership team, first with vice president Daniel Willard leaving the CB&Q to become president of the Baltimore and Ohio Railroad, which led to Darius Miller's post being extended to include Willard's former position; then when George Harris resigned a few weeks later, Miller assumed the presidency and Holden became Miller's assistant. Holden was promoted to vice president on November 8, 1910. Following the sudden death of Darius Miller in 1914 from appendicitis, Holden assumed the presidency of the CB&Q. As one of his last statements, Miller was reported to have asked Louis W. Hill to recommend Holden to James J. Hill as Miller's selection for his successor; Holden was elected president by the railroad's board of directors at a meeting on August 27, 1914, immediately after Miller's funeral. At the time, Holden was the youngest chief executive, at age 45, of any American railroad.

When World War I began and American railroads were brought under the control of the United States Railroad Administration (USRA), Holden was asked to head the USRA but declined the top position, opting instead to assist incumbent director William Gibbs McAdoo. In 1918, Holden stepped down from the CB&Q presidency (to be succeeded by Charles Elliott Perkins, Jr., the son of Charles Elliott Perkins) to become USRA's central western region director, then returned to the presidency of the CB&Q in 1920, serving for another nine years. Also in 1918, Holden was appointed as vice president and director of the American Railway Association, where he served until 1924. He also served from 1922 to 1924 as chairman of the executive committee for Association of Railroad Executives. In the 1920s, Holden advocated, including testifying before the Interstate Commerce Commission in 1922 and 1923, for the consolidation of the railroads in the western United States into four large systems: the Hill railroads (which included Great Northern Railway, Northern Pacific Railroad and Chicago, Burlington and Quincy Railroad), Union Pacific Railroad, Santa Fe Railroad, and Southern Pacific Railroad.

In 1929, leaving the CB&Q again (to be succeeded by Frederick E. Williamson), Holden became chairman of the executive committee for Southern Pacific Railroad (succeeding Henry deForest); he was promoted to chairman of the Southern Pacific in 1932, and finally retired in 1939. Since the Southern Pacific management team was based in New York, Holden also maintained an apartment there at 610 Park Avenue in addition to his home in Chicago.

== Personal life ==
On September 18, 1895, he married Ellen Mitchell Weston, daughter of Byron Weston and Julia (née Mitchell) Weston, in Dalton, Massachusetts, with whom he had two sons and one daughter. His son Hale Holden, Jr., (born in 1900) became an executive with the Pullman Company.

Holden was preceded in death by his wife Ellen on October 22, 1936, in Chicago; she was buried in Dalton, Massachusetts. After her death, he moved to New York City, taking up residence on East 72nd Street in Manhattan.

Hale Holden died on September 23, 1940, in New York. He was survived by his three children, a sister and a brother.

Business positions
Preceded by Darius Miller	President of Chicago, Burlington and Quincy Railroad; 1914–1918	Succeeded by Charles Elliott Perkins, Jr.
Preceded by Charles Elliott Perkins, Jr.	President of Chicago, Burlington and Quincy Railroad; 1920–1929	Succeeded by Frederick E. Williamson
Preceded by Henry deForest	Chairman of the executive committee for Southern Pacific Railroad; 1928–1932	Executive committee dissolved
Preceded by Henry deForest	Chairman of the board of directors for Southern Pacific Railroad; 1932–1939	Vacant Position nonexistent until 1964 Title next held by Donald J. Russell
