= Lockwood de Forest =

American artist (1850–1932)

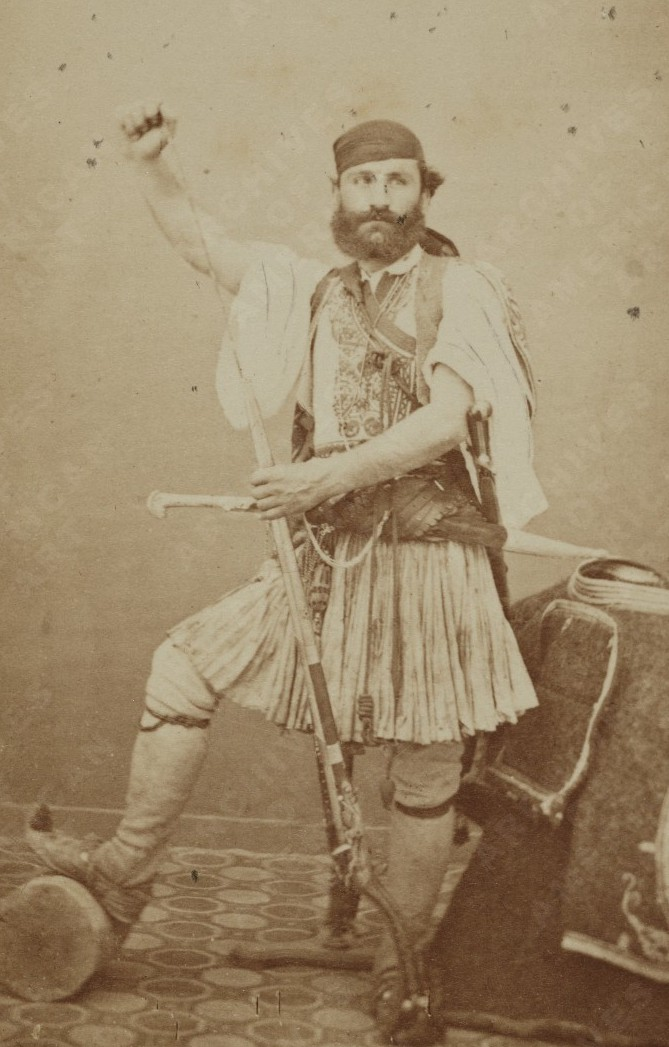
- Lockwood de Forest (circa 1870) in a Greek costume
- Born: June 8, 1850; New York City, New York, U.S.
- Died: April 3, 1932 (aged 81); Santa Barbara, California, U.S.
- Education: Hermann David Salomon Corrodi
- Known for: Painter, designer, decorator
- Movement: Orientalist

Signature
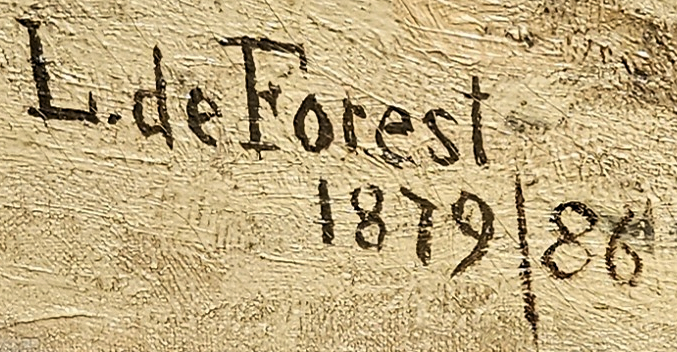

Lockwood de Forest (June 8, 1850 – April 3, 1932) was an American painter, interior designer and furniture designer. A key figure in the Aesthetic Movement, he introduced the East Indian craft revival to Gilded Age America.

As a young man, de Forest first worked as a painter, taking the lessons of his Hudson River School contemporaries. In 1879, de Forest began his career in the decorative arts working at Associated Artists along with Louis Comfort Tiffany, before starting his own decorating business that he ran for thirty years. Upon his retirement, de Forest moved to Santa Barbara where he returned to his love of painting while still taking design commissions from local patrons.

== Early life ==
Lockwood de Forest was born in New York City in 1850 to a prominent family that had made its money in South American and Caribbean shipping. He grew up in Greenwich Village and on Long Island at the family summer estate. Encouraged by his parents, Henry Grant de Forest and Julia Mary Weeks, Lockwood and his three siblings developed lifelong interests in the arts; the eldest son, Robert Weeks DeForest (1848–1931), served for seventeen years as the president of The Metropolitan Museum of Art in New York; their sister, Julia Brasher (1853–1910), wrote a book on the history of art; and their youngest brother, Henry Wheeler DeForest (1855–1938), was an avid art collector and amateur landscape architect.

He was matriculated at Columbia College with the class of 1872, but did not graduate according to official records.

During a visit to Rome in 1868, nineteen-year-old de Forest first began to study art seriously, taking painting lessons from the Italian landscapist Hermann David Salomon Corrodi (1844–1905). On the same trip, Lockwood met the American painter (and a distant relative of his half-uncle by marriage) Frederic Edwin Church (1826–1900) who became his mentor. De Forest accompanied Church on sketching trips around Italy and continued this practice when they both returned to America in 1869. In 1872, de Forest took a studio at the Tenth Street Studio Building in New York. During these formative years, de Forest counted among his friends artists such as Sanford Robinson Gifford (1823–80), John Frederick Kensett (1816–72), Jervis McEntee (1828–91), and Walter Launt Palmer (1854–1932).

Over the next decade, de Forest experienced moderate success as a painter. He exhibited for the first time at the National Academy of Design in 1872 and made two more painting trips abroad, in 1875–76 and 1877–78, traveling to the major continental capitals but also the Middle East and North Africa. De Forest's works from the 1870s are generally modest-sized canvases depicting low-key views in an evocative painterly style.

== Career ==
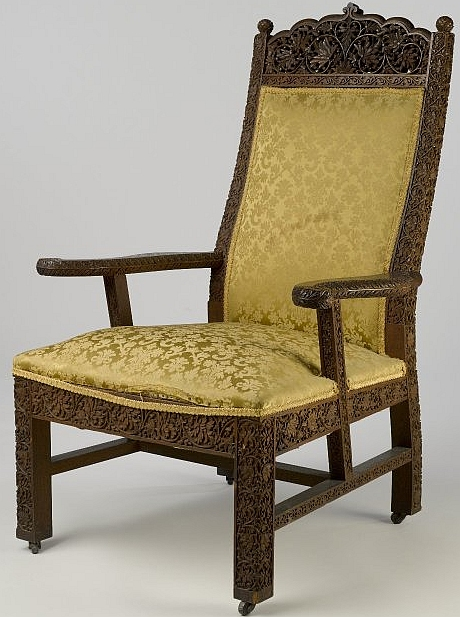
Armchair Designer: Lockwood de Forest, Manufacturer: Ahmedabad Wood Carving Company, Teak, produced in Ahmedabad, India ca. 1895, Brooklyn Museum

In his mid-twenties, de Forest became interested in decoration and architecture after browsing Church's extensive library at his Persian-style home, Olana, in New York. De Forest's first major interior design project was to remodel his parents' New York townhouse in 1876.

In 1879, de Forest became a partner of the design firm Associated Artists, with Louis Comfort Tiffany (1848–1933), Samuel Colman (1832–1920), and Candace Wheeler (1827–1923) where he directed the production of architectural woodwork. Associated Artists lasted only four years, however the firm was one of the most influential decorating companies in the 19th century, and at the forefront of the American Aesthetic Movement emphasizing hand work, intricate color and texture, and tasteful but exotic design themes.

The same year he joined Associated Artists de Forest married Meta Kemble and the newlyweds visited British India on their honeymoon. During what became a two-year trip, de Forest collected furniture, jewelry and textiles as he and his wife traveled through Bombay (Mumbai), Surat, Baroda (Vadodara), Ahmadabad, Agra, Delhi, Amritsar, Lahore, and Srinagar. In Ahmadabad de Forest met Muggunbhai Hutheesing, a philanthropist with an interest in the arts, and together the two men opened the Ahmadabad Woodcarving Company. This studio became crucial to supplying Associated Artists with carved architectural elements and furniture. While in India de Forest also became good friends with John Lockwood Kipling (father of Rudyard Kipling), who shared de Forest's passion for Indian art. Together, the two men organized a display of works by the Ahmadabad Woodcarving Company at the Lahore Museum in 1881.

After Associated Artists closed in 1882, de Forest opened his own design business in New York with a lavish showroom at 9 East 17th Street. In addition to managing the design, production and import of Indian goods, de Forest continued to design his own furnishings and architectural ornaments. His work was exhibited at the Colonial and Indian Exhibition in London in 1886 and at the World's Columbian Exposition seven years later. De Forest's offerings at these fairs attracted an impressive array of clients, including the industrialist Andrew Carnegie (de Forest designed Carnegie's bedroom and library in the Andrew Carnegie House, now the Cooper-Hewitt Museum), transportation magnate Charles Tyson Yerkes, Chicago businessman Potter Palmer, and author Mark Twain.

In 1887, de Forest bought 7 East 10th Street. He had the architect Van Campen Taylor design a plain, basic house that he then proceeded to decorate with intricately carved teak elements made in India. The home was featured in a New York Times article in 1895, where it was written: "The De Forest house surpasses all others in the completeness and harmony of its Oriental character… [The architectural elements and furnishings] are as wholly East Indian as though they were furnishing a Hindu instead of a New-York apartment." Today, this home is the Bronfman Center for Jewish Student Life at New York University.

While working in the decorating business, de Forest had continued to paint at home and he exhibited his work frequently at the Century Association and the National Academy of Design. In 1898, de Forest was made a full member of the academy and it was around this time, with a declining market for exotic interiors, that de Forest became a prolific painter again.

== Later life and death ==
After beginning to winter in Santa Barbara, California around 1902, de Forest built a house and moved there permanently in 1915. He was attracted to the comfortable climate and striking coastlines of the West Coast and, while he continued to design and decorate houses, landscape painting became his primary occupation. De Forest created hundreds of oil sketches of Californian sites, and also traveled around the Pacific Northwest (1903), Maine (1905 and 1908), the Grand Canyon (1906 and 1909), Mexico (1904, 1906–7 and 1911), Massachusetts (1910) and Alaska (1912). Lockwood de Forest died in Santa Barbara on April 3, 1932. He was interred at Green-Wood Cemetery in Brooklyn, New York.

== Ahmedabad Woodcarving Company ==
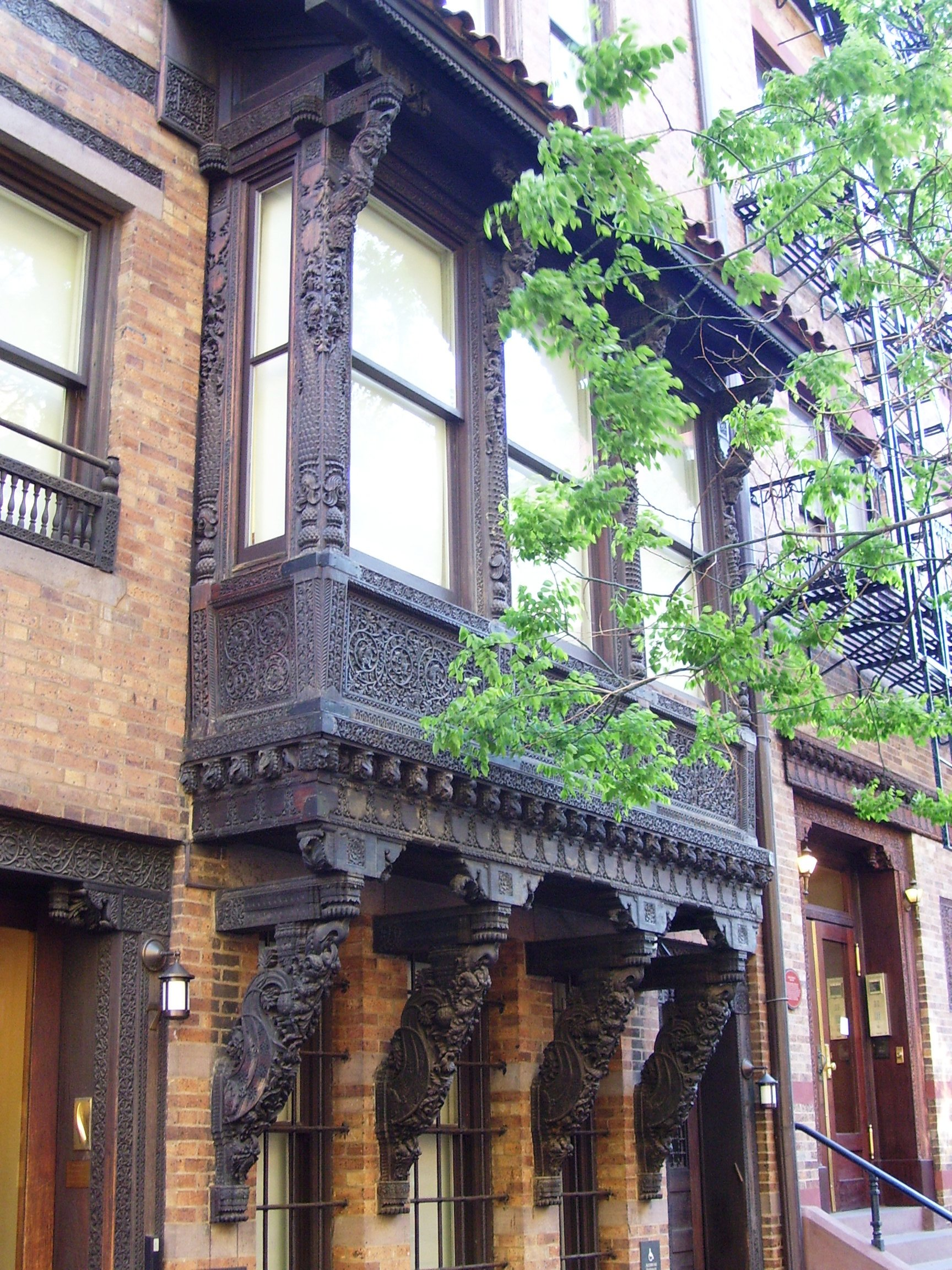
Lockwood de Forest House (now Bronfman Center for Jewish Student Life) at 7 East 10th St. New York City

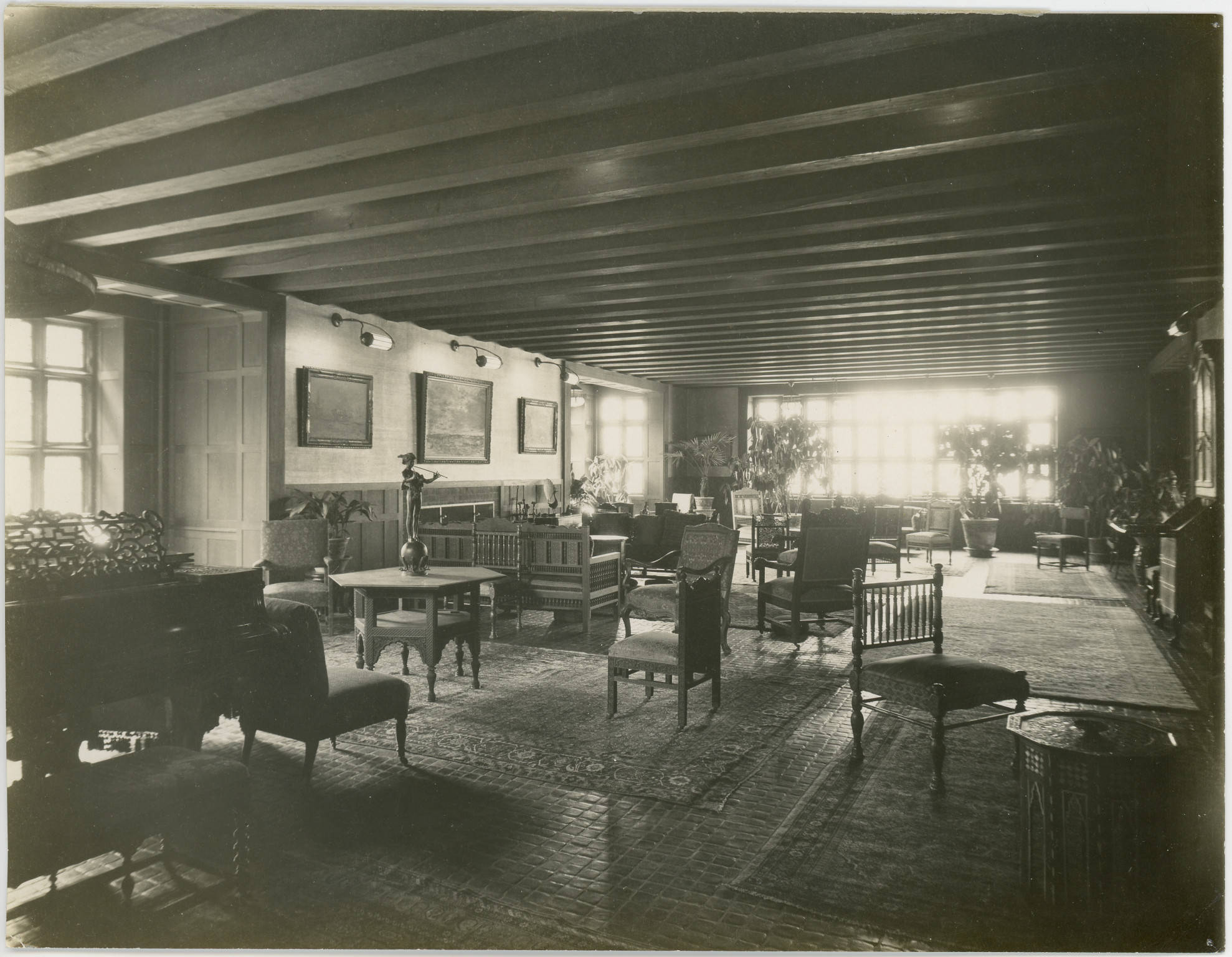
Sitting Room, The Deanery, Bryn Mawr College, Bryn Mawr, Pennsylvania. Decorated by de Forest in 1908.

In 1879, de Forest and Tiffany established an import business called Tiffany and de Forest. In 1879, while visiting India for the first time, he collaborated with Mugganbhai Hutheesing to start the Ahmedabad Woodcarving Company, which produced elaborately carved furniture, tracery panels, jewelry, and textiles. Eventually, in 1908, he transferred his contract with the Ahmedabad Woodcarving Company to Tiffany.

Surviving examples of the carved teakwood furniture from the Ahmedabad Woodcarving Company include:

- The town house that de Forest built for himself at 7 East 10th Street between 1886 and 1888, once heralded as "the most Indian house in America." It is now the Bronfman Center for Jewish Student Life at New York University.
- Baltimore Indian restaurant, "The Brass Elephant" at 924 N. Charles Street
- The Lockwood de Forest Collection at Bryn Mawr College (Bryn Mawr, Pennsylvania)
- Cooper-Hewett National Design Museum, Carnegie Teak Room
- Alice Greenwood Chapman had de Forest replicate the Chicago World's Fair teak room. The room is now the Teakwood Room of the Jason Downer Commons at Lawrence University.
- Olana State Historic Site, former home of Frederic Edwin Church

Lockwood de Forest imported a part (gudha-mandapa) of a 1596 Jain temple at Patan, Gujarat and donated it to the Metropolitan Museum of Art in 1916.

It is likely that the St. Louis Jain temple, which once stood in the 1904 Louisiana Purchase Exposition and is now preserved at the Jain Center of Southern California, was designed and created by the Ahmadabad Woodcarving Company.

== Collections ==
- Alaska State Museum, Juneau, Alaska
- Art Institute of Chicago
- Baltimore Museum of Art
- Brooklyn Museum
- Bryn Mawr College, Pennsylvania
- Century Association, New York, New York
- Cleveland Museum of Art
- Cooper Hewitt, Smithsonian Design Museum (former home of Andrew Carnegie)
- Fine Arts Museums of San Francisco
- Heckscher Museum of Art, Huntington, New York
- Herron Art Institute, Indianapolis, Indiana
- Huntington Museum of Art, Huntington, West Virginia
- Indianapolis Museum of Art
- Lahore Museum, Pakistan
- Mark Twain House and Museum, Hartford, Connecticut
- Merchant Ivory Foundation, Claverack, New York
- Metropolitan Museum of Art
- Naulakha, Dummerston, Vermont (former home of Rudyard Kipling)
- National Academy of Design, New York, New York
- New York University's Bronfman Center for Jewish Student Life (former home of Lockwood de Forest)
- New-York Historical Society
- Olana State Historic Site, New York (former home of Frederic Edwin Church)
- Santa Barbara Museum of Art, Santa Barbara, California
- Society for the Preservation of Long Island Antiquities, Cold Spring Harbor, New York
- Virginia Museum of Fine Arts, Richmond, Virginia
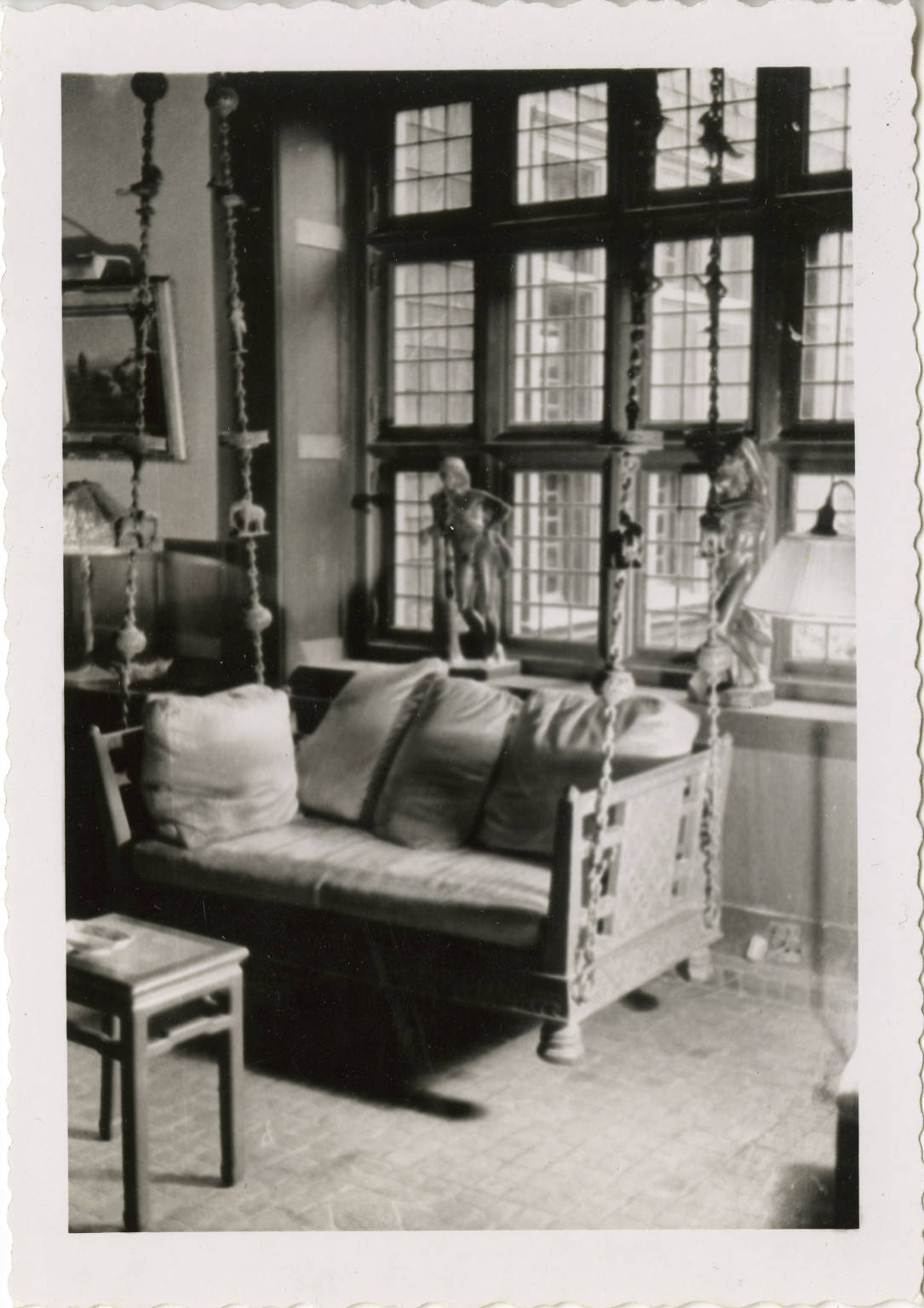
Swing Settee (1908), The Deanery, Bryn Mawr College, Bryn Mawr, Pennsylvania.

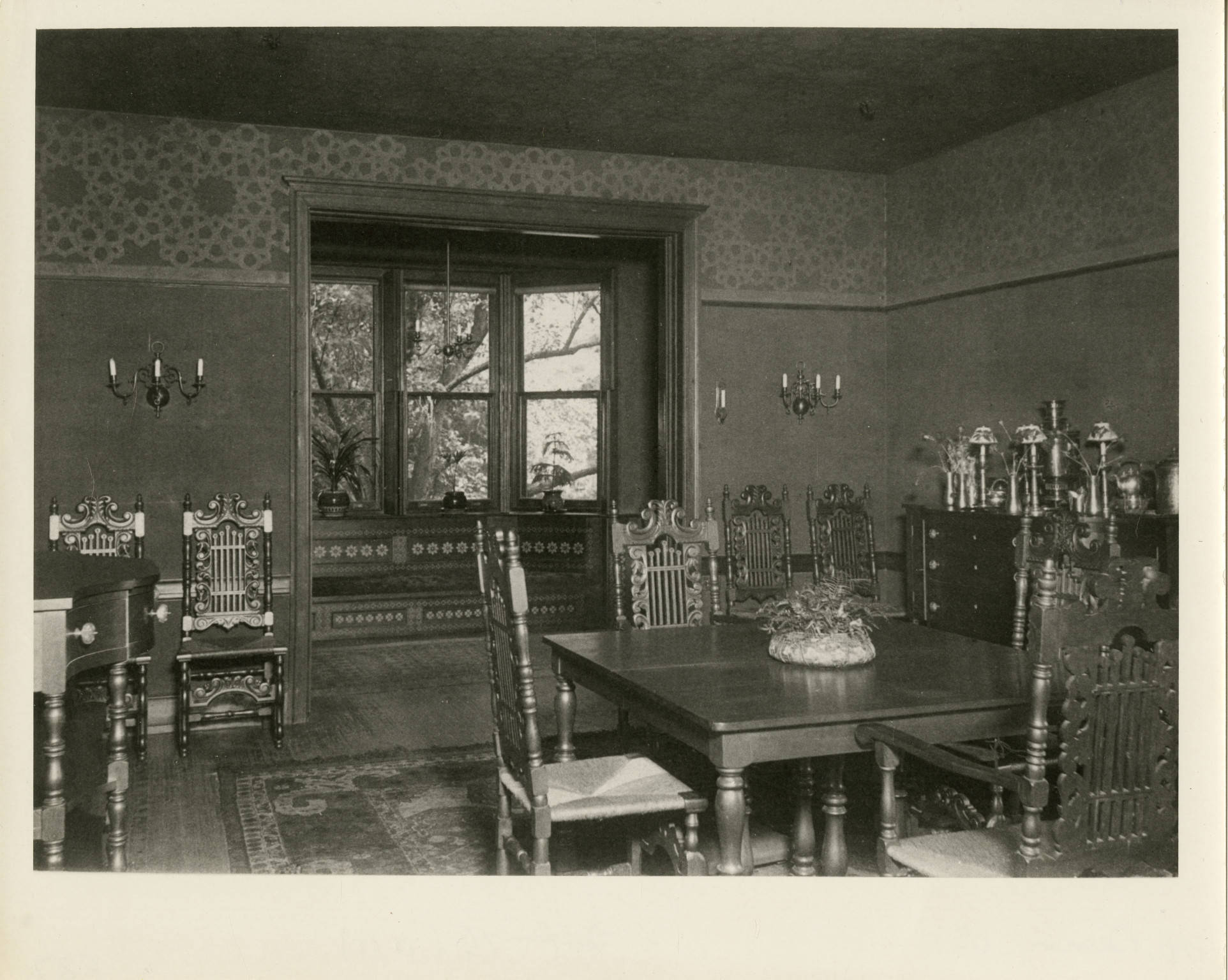
Stenciling in Dining Room of The Deanery (1908–09), Bryn Mawr College, Bryn Mawr, Pennsylvania.

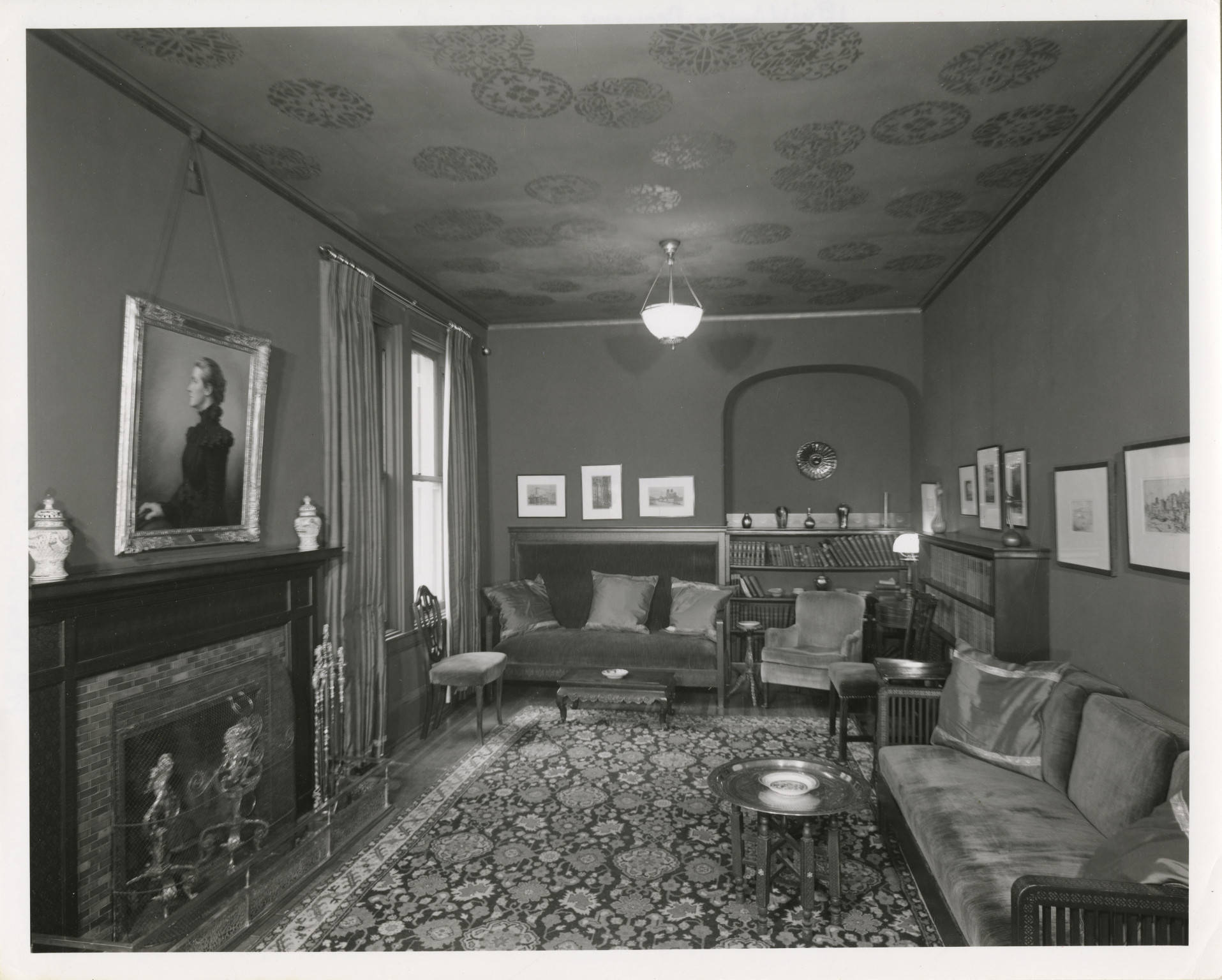
Stenciling in Blue Room of The Deanery (1908–09), Bryn Mawr College, Bryn Mawr, Pennsylvania.
