= Nathaniel Prime =

American banker (1768–1840)

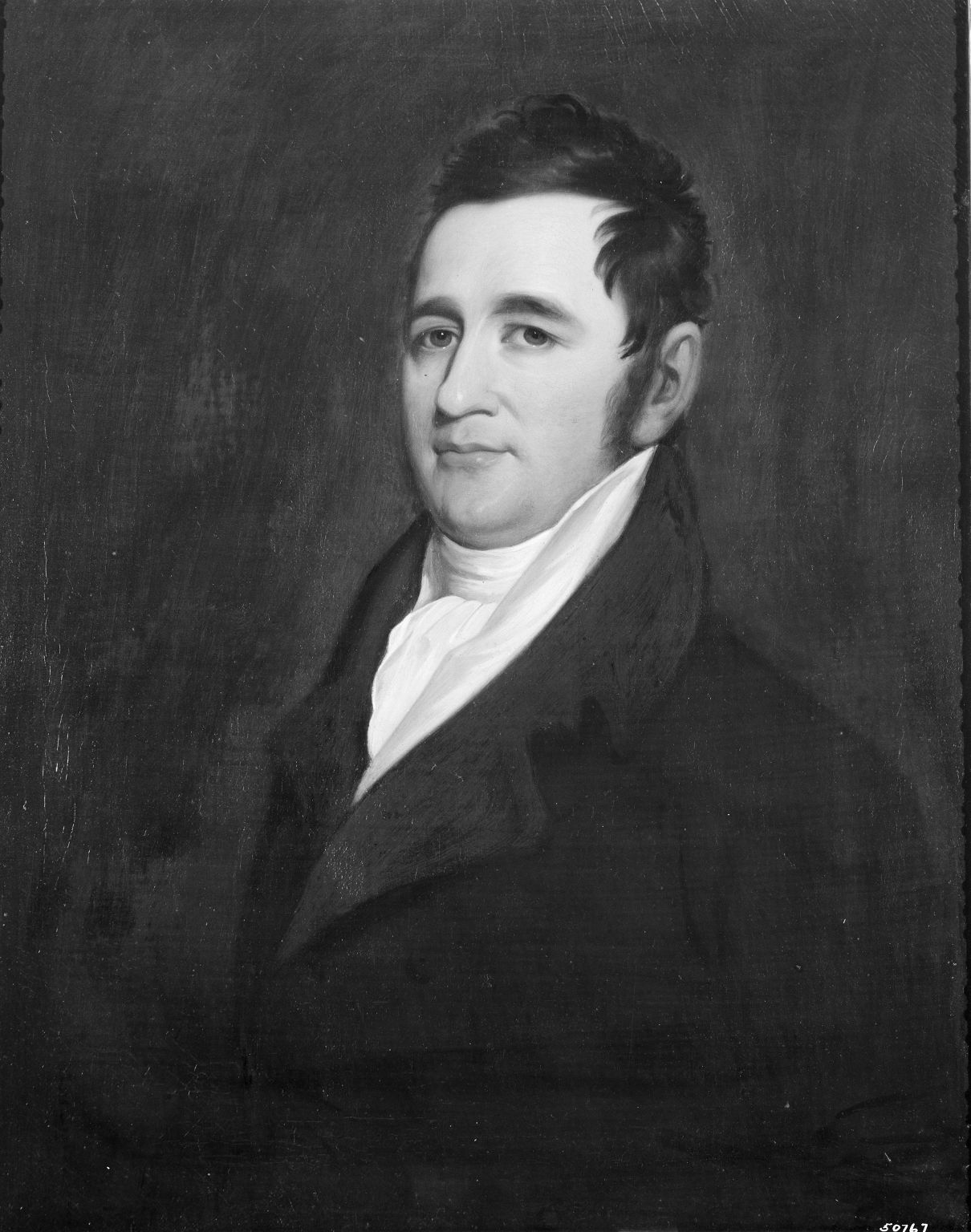
- The b/w version of a portrait of Nathaniel Prime by Oliver Ingraham Lay, 1879 (copy after John Trumbull)
- Born: January 30, 1768; Rowley, Massachusetts, British America
- Died: November 26, 1840 (aged 72); New York City, U.S.
- Occupations: Broker and banker
- Spouse: Cornelia Sands
- Partner: Cornelia Sands (1773–1852)
- Children: Edward Prime
- Parent(s): Joshua Prime; Bridget Hammond Prime
- Relatives: William Seton III (grandson)

Nathaniel Prime (January 30, 1768 – November 26, 1840) was a New York broker and banker.

== Early life ==
Prime was born in Rowley, Massachusetts on January 30, 1768. He was the son of Joshua Prime and Bridget Hammond Prime.

In his early years, he was a coachman to Boston merchant William Gray and moved to New York in 1795.

== Career ==
In 1796, Prime organized "Nathaniel Prime, Stock and Commission Broker" at 42 Wall Street. He made great wealth buying and selling bank stocks. After opening his own private bank, he allowed customers to deposit money and then loaned it out.

In 1808, he brought in Samuel Ward III as a partner and the firm was renamed Prime & Ward. In 1816, Joseph Sands, Prime's brother-in-law, was made a partner and the firm became Prime, Ward & Sands.

In 1824, the firm was again reorganized as Prime, Ward, Sands & King when James Gore King became a partner upon his return from England. King, a son of U.S. Senator Rufus King, had previously been affiliated with the firm of King & Gracie, founded in 1818 in Liverpool, England by King and his brother-in-law, Archibald Gracie Jr. (the son of Archibald Gracie). In 1826, after Joseph died the firm became Prime, Ward & King. Nathaniel Prime retired from the firm in 1832 and his son Edward took his place.

=== Residence ===
Prime and his family lived in a house on the corner of Broadway and Battery Place. In 1807, he purchased a house and 130 acres for a country seat at Hell Gate, New York near Yorkville, New York. The building stood on the block between First Avenue and York Avenue and 89th and 90th streets. In 1857, the mansion was purchased by the Redemptorists, who opened St. Joseph's Orphan Asylum.

John Frazee did a sculpture of Prime.

== Personal life ==
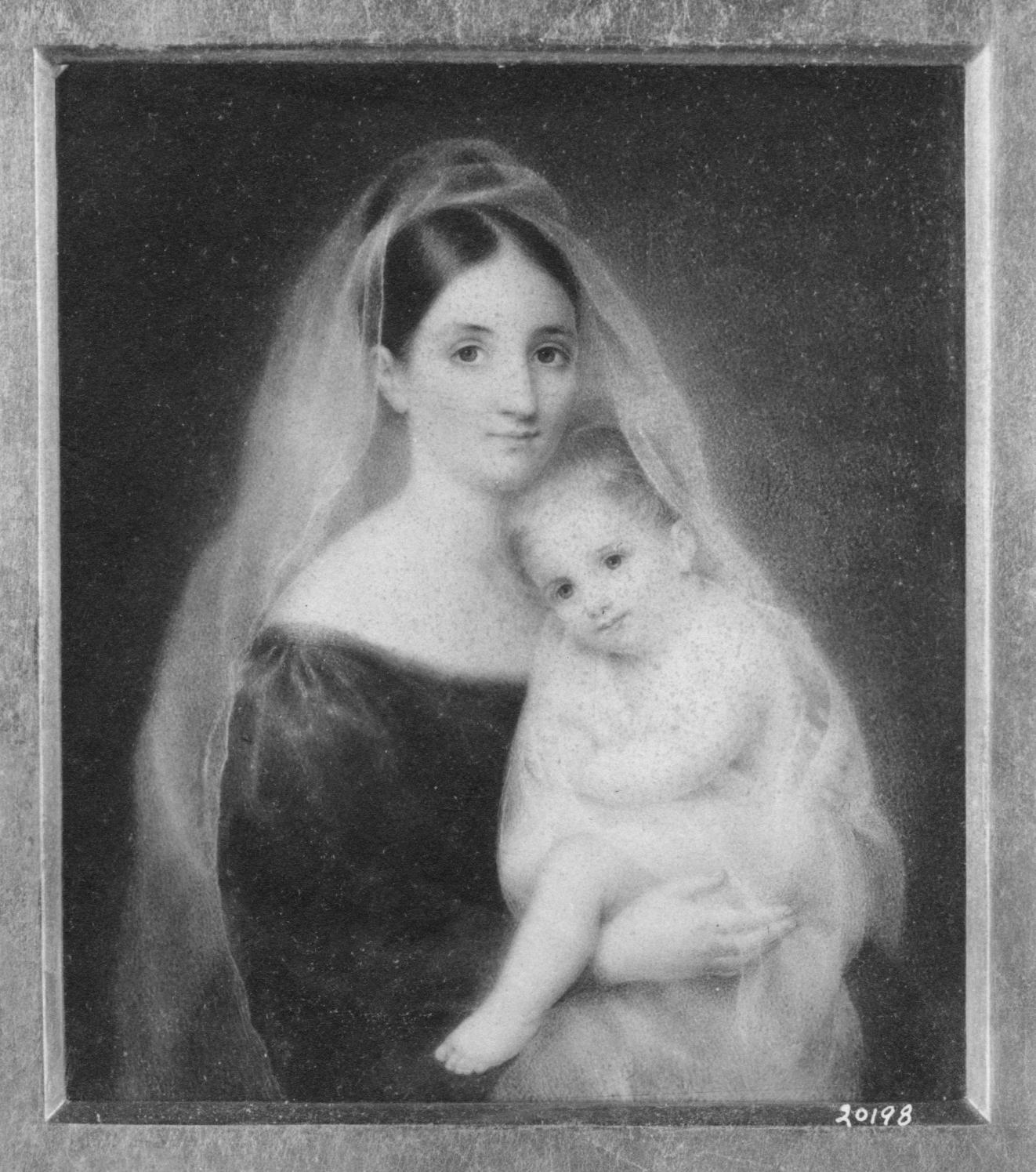
Miniature portrait of Prime's daughter Laura and granddaughter Laura, by Ann Hall.

On June 7, 1797, Prime was married to Cornelia Sands (1773–1852), the daughter of Comfort Sands (d. 1835), the celebrated merchant, banker and Continental Congressman, and Elizabeth (née Cornell) Sands. Together, they were the parents of:

- Cornelia Prime (1800–1874), who married Robert Ray (1794–1879), brother-in-law of New York Gov. John Alsop King.
- Edward Prime (1801–1883), a banker with Prime, Ward & King who married Charlotte Wilkins Hoffman (1808–1892).
- Emily Prime (1804–1854), who married William Seton (1796–1868), a U.S. Navy captain and son of Elizabeth Ann Seton, in 1832.
- Frederick Prime (1807–1887), who married Lydia Hare (1815–1883), a daughter of Robert Hare.
- Matilda Prime (1810–1849), who married Gerard Holsman Coster (1808–1880), son of John Gerard Coster in 1831.
- Laura Prime (1812–1887), who married John Clarkson Jay (1808–1891), the son of Peter A. Jay and grandson of John Jay.

Prime committed suicide on November 26, 1840, by cutting his throat. William H. Aspinwall served on the coroner's jury, and Edgar Howland informed diarist George Templeton Strong that:

"Prime went to his room at two o'clock and appears to have taken up and read his prayer book, then went before the glass, cut his throat coolly and steadily from ear to ear, replaced the razor in its case, and then walked into the next room, and there fell. The jury found "insanity." He had been dyspeptic and nervous for some time; he was retired from active life and his mind, I suppose, preyed on itself for want of occupation ..."

=== Descendants ===
Through his daughter Cornelia, he was the grandfather of Cornelia Ray (1829–1867), who married Gen. Schuyler Hamilton (1822–1903), a grandson of Alexander Hamilton; Robert Ray (1832–1860), and Nathalie Elizabeth Ray (1837–1912), who married Edmund Lincoln Baylies (1829–1869), the parents of Edmund L. Baylies Jr.

Through his daughter Emily, he was the grandfather of author, novelist and popular science writer William Seton III (1835–1905), Robert Seton (1839–1927), a monsignor in the Roman Catholic Church and titular archbishop of Heliopolis.

Through his son Edward, he was the grandfather of William Hoffman Prime (1837–1881), who married Annie Rhodes Gilbert in 1879; Mary Catherine Prime (b. 1841), who married James A. Scrimper in 1868; and Henry Prime (b. 1847). William's children included Charlotte Hoffman Prime (1881–1969), who married William Massena Benjamin (1874–1928), the son of Samuel Nicholl Benjamin; and Charlotte Prime (b. 1838), who married Leonard J. Wyeth in 1858.
