= Robert W. DeForest =

American lawyer and executive (1848-1931)

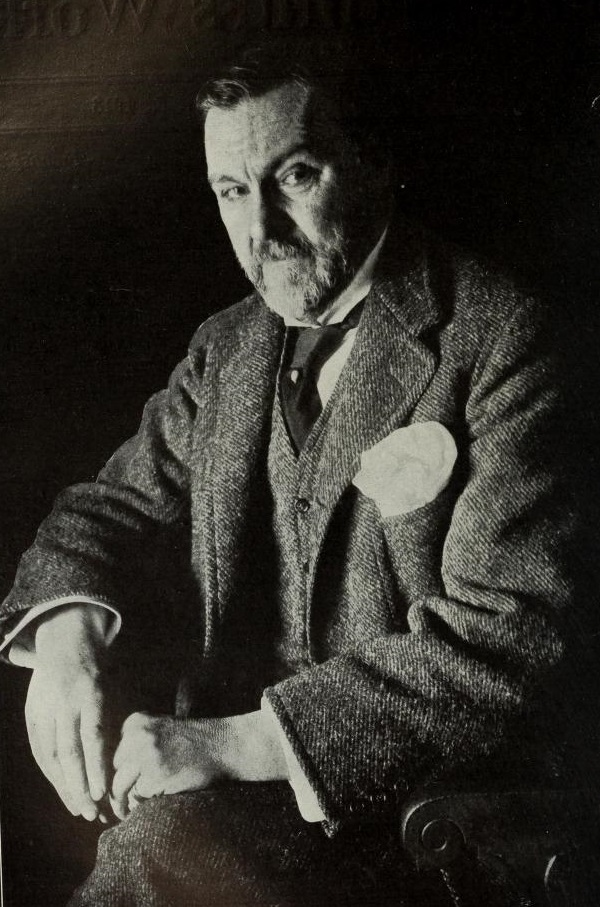
- Pictured in 1913
- Born: April 25, 1848; New York City
- Died: May 6, 1931 (aged 83)
- Parent(s): Henry Grant; Julia Mary Weeks DeForest
- Relatives: Henry deForest (brother); Lockwood de Forest (brother); Robert Doughty Weeks (grandfather)

Robert Weeks DeForest (1848–1931) was an American lawyer, executive, financier, and philanthropist.

== Early life ==
Robert Weeks DeForest was born to Henry Grant and Julia Mary Weeks DeForest in New York City on April 25, 1848, of French Huguenot ancestry. His grandfathers were the South Street merchant Lockwood DeForest and the New York Stock Exchange's first President, Robert Doughty Weeks. He attended primary school in New York City and Easthampton, Massachusetts, before graduating from Yale College with honors in 1870. DeForest received his law degree from Columbia University two years later and subsequently practiced law following admission to the Bar.

== Career ==
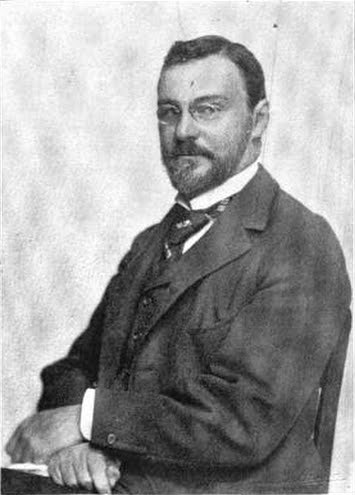
DeForest in 1902

DeForest served as general counsel for the Central Railroad of New Jersey, and in 1902, became a vice president. He led the Hackensack Water Company from 1881 to 1926 and served as its president for at least 15 years, and as a trustee or director of multiple other corporations.

He also led public charity work. In 1901, President Theodore Roosevelt appointed DeForest to the State Tenement House Commission, which he served as chairman and which produced the Tenement House Act of 1901. It also led to the creation of a New York State Tenement House Department in 1902, following an amendment to the state charter. That year, DeForest was appointed New York City's first Tenement House Commissioner. He also served the New York State Conference of Charities and Corrections as well as the National Conference of Charities and Correction. In 1894, he co-founded and was the first president of the Provident Loan Society, which offered the poor lower interest loan alternatives to loan sharks. DeForest additionally served as a manager of NewYork–Presbyterian Hospital and the American Bible Society, and dedicated 50 acres of his Long Island properties through West Hills and Dix Hills in rights of way to the state's Northern State Parkway project.

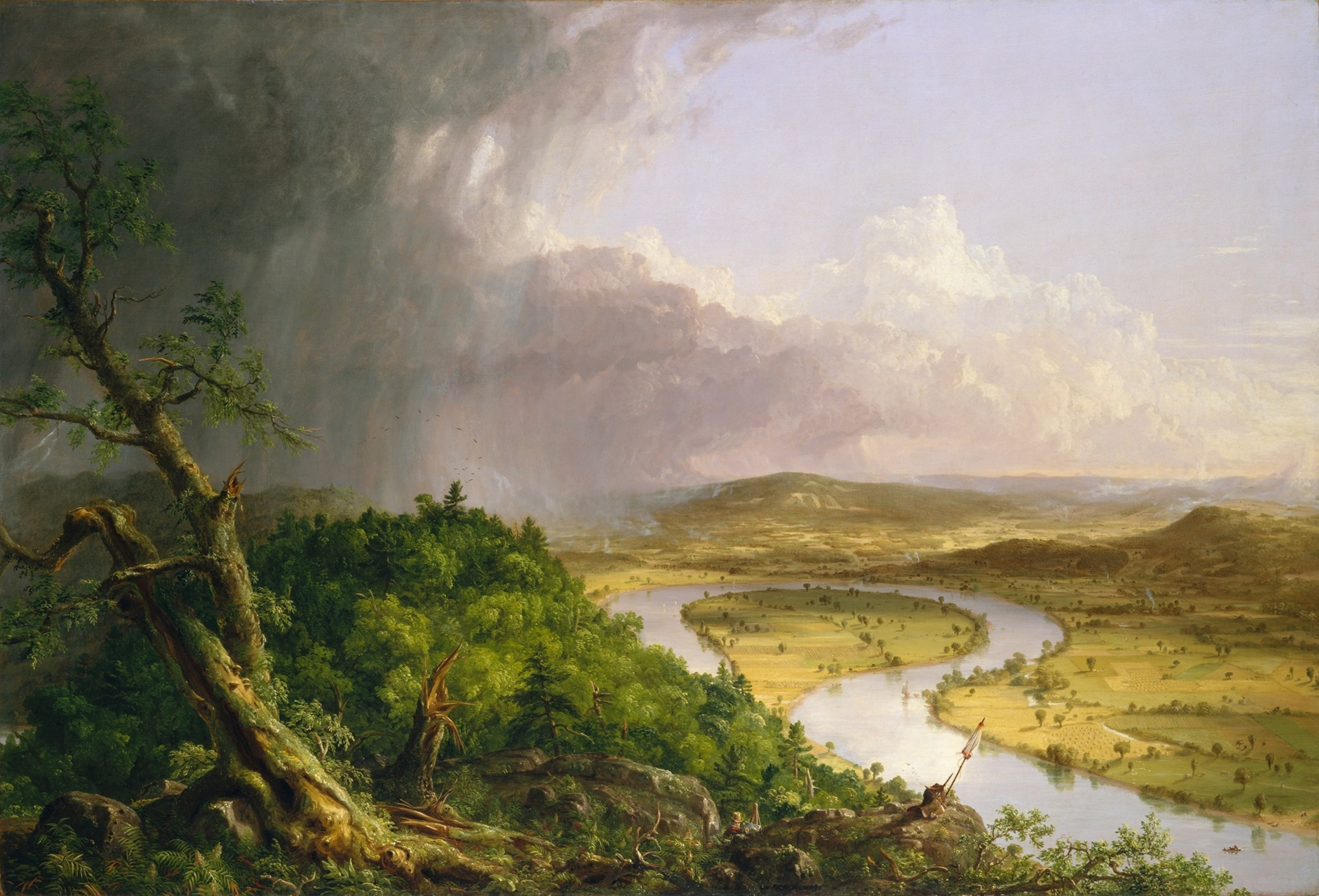

DeForest served as a trustee of the Metropolitan Museum of Art in 1889, and became its president in 1913, following J. P. Morgan. The Museum later published a monograph by DeForest, Art in Merchandise: Notes on the Relationships of Stores and Museums, in 1928.

== Personal life ==
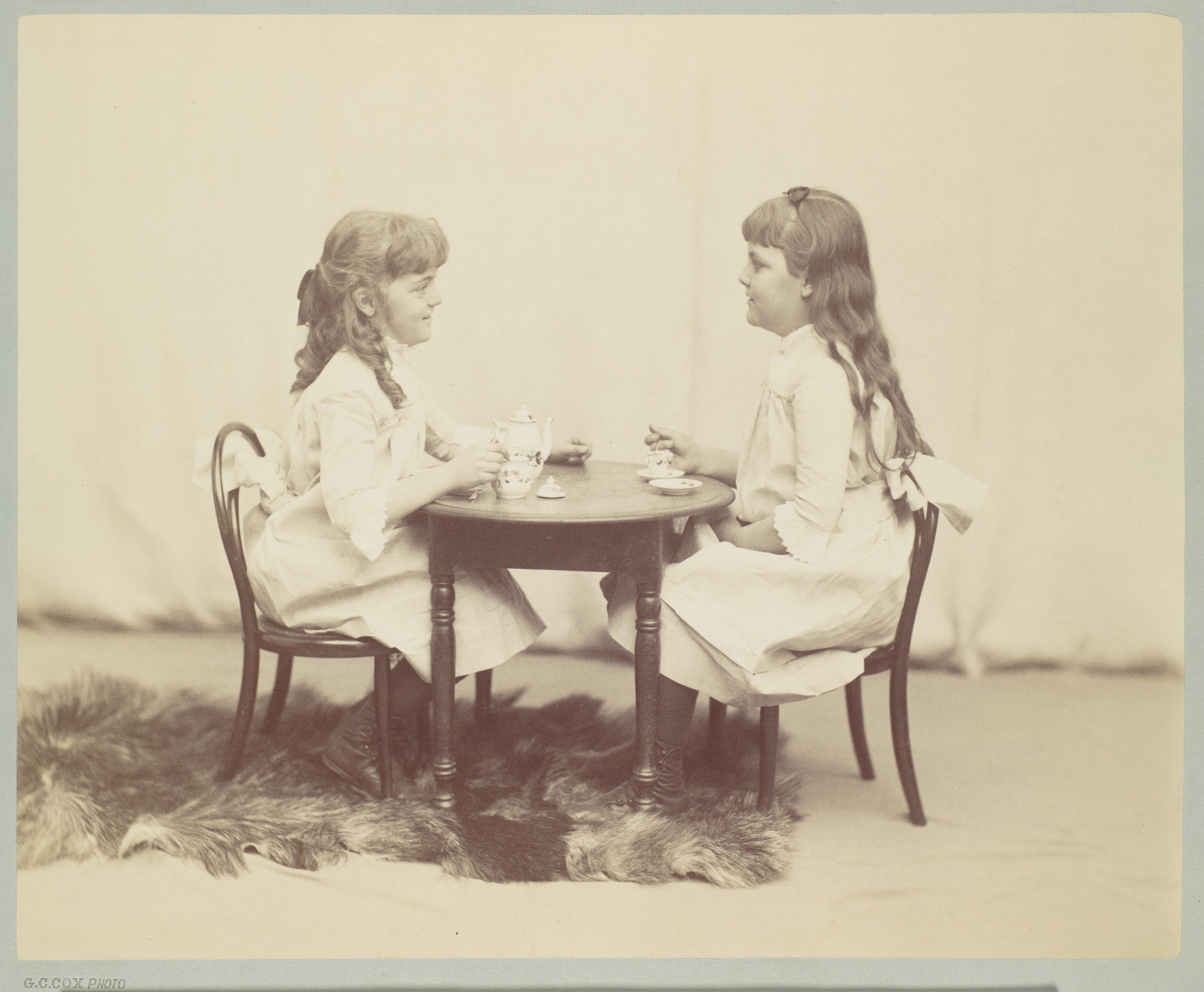
Two of DeForest's children

DeForest married Emily Johnson, the oldest daughter of Central Railroad of New Jersey President John Taylor Johnston, in 1872 and had four children. One of these, Henry L. deForest, was president of Hackensack Water Company from 1936 to 1950, and Lake DeForest is named after Henry.

Robert belonged to organizations including the Century, University, Grolier, Jekyll Island, and Seawanhaka Yacht Clubs.

DeForest's Wawapek Farm, a country house built in 1898 in Cold Spring Harbor, was designed by Grosvenor Atterbury to follow the hill's curve in a comfortable American style distinct from the severe formality of European houses. Through a partnership between his descendants, the community, and local government, a portion of the land was designated as the 32-acre Wawapek Preserve in 2015.
