= Prime, Ward & King =

Defunct American bank

- Industry: Financial
- Predecessor: Nathaniel Prime, Stock and Commission Broker; Prime & Ward; Prime, Ward & Sands; Prime, Ward, Sands, King & Company
- Founded: 1796
- Founder: Nathaniel Prime
- Defunct: 1847
- Headquarters: 42 Wall Street, New York City
- Key people: Nathaniel Prime; Samuel Ward III; James Gore King; Samuel Cutler Ward

Prime, Ward & King was a prominent American investment bank based in New York City in the 18th and 19th Century. The firm collapsed in September 1847.

== History ==
In 1796, Nathaniel Prime organized "Nathaniel Prime, Stock and Commission Broker" at 42 Wall Street, where he bought and sold bank stocks. After opening the private bank, he allowed customers to deposit money and then loaned it out.

In 1808, Prime brought in Samuel Ward III as a partner and the firm was renamed Prime & Ward. In 1816, Joseph Sands, Prime's brother-in-law, was made a partner and the firm became Prime, Ward & Sands.

In 1823, Prime met with and, eventually, invited James Gore King to become a partner upon his return from England. King, a son of U.S. Senator Rufus King, had previously been affiliated with the firm of King & Gracie, founded in 1818 in Liverpool, England by King and his brother-in-law, Archibald Gracie, Jr. (the son of Archibald Gracie). King wound up the affairs of the house in England, returned to New York and became a partner of the house of Prime, Ward, Sands, King & Company on May 1, 1824, which at the time consisted of Nathaniel Prime, Samuel Ward, Joseph Sands, James G. King and Robert Ray (Prime's son-in-law).

In 1826, after Joseph died the firm was again reorganized as Prime, Ward & King with the previous partners and including Edward Prime, Prime's son. In 1832, Prime retired and was replaced as a partner in the firm by his son, Edward.

In 1839, Ward died and was replaced by his son Samuel Cutler Ward, who had joined the firm the previous year. In 1844, King's son Archibald Gracie King joined the firm, which already included Denning Duer, the son of William Alexander Duer and the elder King's son-in-law. In 1846, King and his family left the firm and started James G. King & Son, which he operated until his death in 1853.

The firm stunned the financial world in September 1847, when it collapsed as a result, according to some observers, of the younger Ward's "excessive speculation in commodities." Ward, now bankrupt, left New York to join the California gold rush, then returned to New York several years later with a new fortune that he then lost, before embarking on a new career as a lobbyist that led him to be called "the King of the Lobby".

=== Services ===
Among their biggest clients was Baring Brothers, a British merchant bank based in London that was the world's second oldest merchant bank founded in 1762 and owned by the German-originated Baring family of merchants and bankers.

In 1823, Baring bought Erie Canal bonds through the firm, causing other international investors to do the same. The success of the Canal bonds caused the firm to take the lead in financing American expansion out west.

After the financial crisis of 1836 to 1837, the Bank of England, in an effort to assist New York City banks in resuming specie payment, confided a loan of almost 5 million dollars of gold to the firm, which was considered a remarkable sign of confidence. Samuel Ward III was made President of the Bank of Commerce in New York, a predecessor of the bank later known as J.P. Morgan & Co., in 1839.

== Timeline ==
The firm was known by various names throughout its existence, including:

- Nathaniel Prime, Stock and Commission Broker (1796–1808)
- Prime & Ward (1808–1816)
- Prime, Ward & Sands (1817–1825)
- Prime, Ward, Sands, King & Company (1825–1826)
- Prime, Ward & King (1826–1846)
- Prime, Ward & Company (1847)
- James G. King & Son (1847–1853)

== See also ==
- Nathaniel Prime
