= William Seton (writer) =

American author, novelist and writer

William Seton III
- Born: 28 January 1835; New York, U. S.
- Died: March 28, 1905 (aged 70); New York, U. S.
- Education: St. John's College, Fordham; Mt. St. Mary's, Emmittsburg; University of Bonn
- Occupations: Author novelist science writer
- Spouse: Sarah Redwood Parrish (m. 1884)

William Seton III (28 January 1835 - 15 March 1905) was an American author, a novelist and popular science writer. He was from one of America's most distinguished Roman Catholic families. His paternal grandmother was Elizabeth Ann Bayley Seton, the first American citizen to be canonized by the Roman Catholic Church.

== Life ==
William Seton was born at 22 Bond Street in New York City, one of nine children of William and Emily Prime Seton, seven of whom survived to adulthood. William Sr. was a lieutenant in the U. S. Navy. Another son, Robert, became rector of St. Joseph's Church, Jersey City. His sister Helen (1844–1906) joined the Sisters of Mercy taking the name Sister Mary Catherine. They were cousins of Archbishop of Baltimore James Roosevelt Bayley.

He was educated at St. John's College, Fordham, at Mt. St. Mary's, Emmittsburg, Md., and at the University of Bonn. He traveled extensively abroad before entering a law office in New York.

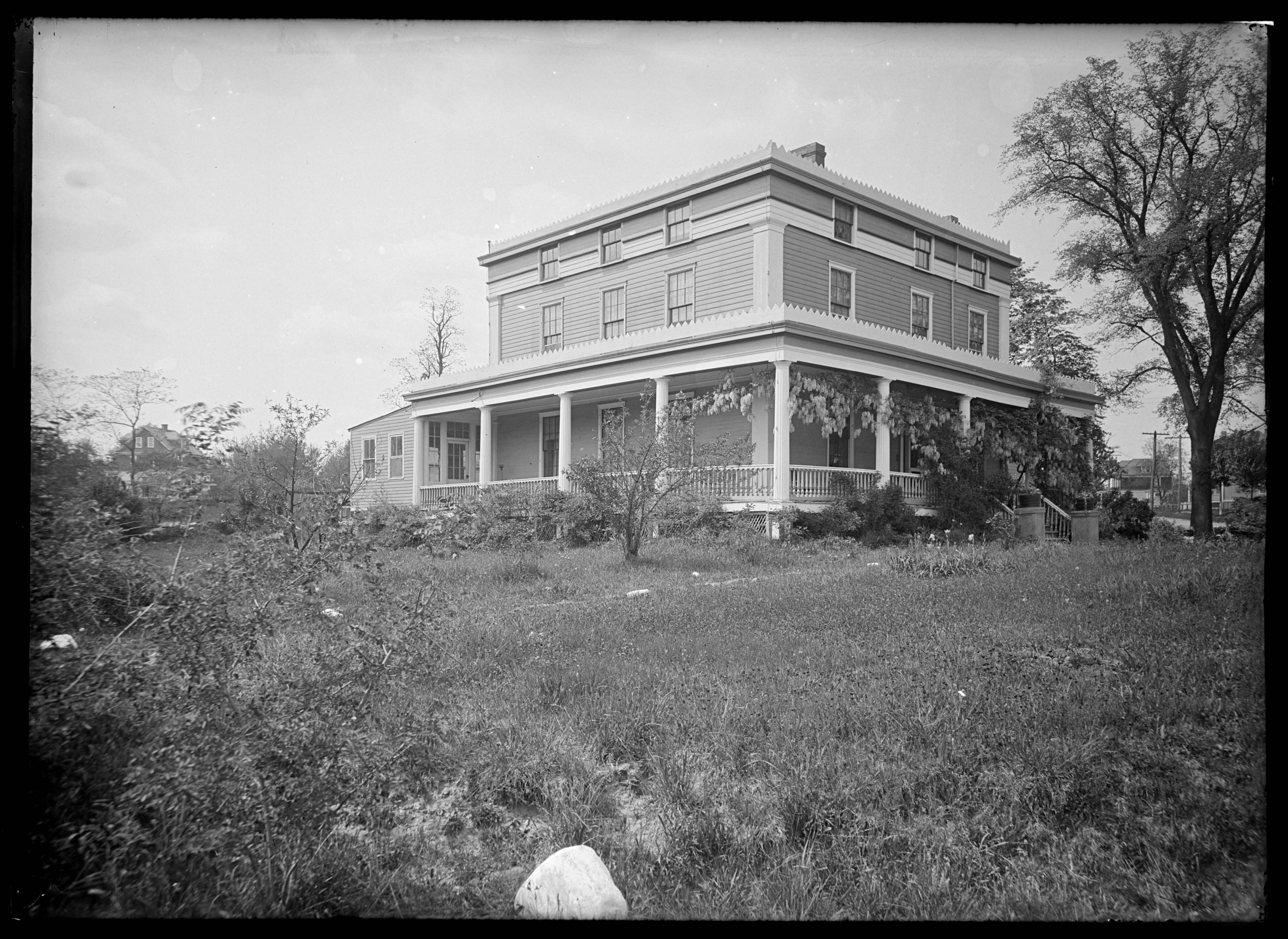
Cragdon, Eastchester, Bronx, 1913

Soon after his admission to the bar he answered Lincoln's first call for troops in 1861. He was disabled for a time by two wounds received in the Battle of Antietam, where he fought as captain of the Forty-first New York Volunteers, French's Division, Sumner's Corps. Seton recovered at St. Joseph's Military Hospital, at McGowan's Pass, cared for by the Sisters of Charity of New York, a religious community founded by his grandmother.

He returned to the family home, Cragdon. Originally called 'The Cedars", the estate was later named after a place purchased in 1784 by his great-grandfather William Seton in upper Manhattan. It was purchased by William's maternal grandfather, banker Nathaniel Prime, who bequeathed it to William's mother, Emily. Seton returned to the front to be captain of the 16th Artillery in Grant's campaign against Richmond.

== Works ==
After the war he devoted himself chiefly to literature, publishing two historical novels, "Romance of the Charter Oak" (1870) and "Pride of Lexington" (1871); "The Pioneer", a poem (1874); "Rachel's Fate" (1882); "The Shamrock Gone West", and "Moire" (1884). About 1886 he went to Europe for serious study in paleontology, psychology, etc., and thereafter usually spent the greater part of each year in France in such pursuits. His forte was presenting scientific matters in attractive English. He issued a brief work, "A Glimpse of Organic Life, Past and Present" (1897). He was a frequent contributor of scientific articles to the 'Catholic World. "The Building of the Mountain", a novel, was in the press at the time of his death.

His alma mater, Mt. St. Mary's, conferred on him the degree of LL.D. in 1890.

== Family ==
Coat of Arms of William Seton

He married Sarah Redwood Parrish on January 3, 1884; their only child, William, died in infancy.

=== Ancestors ===
==== William Seton ====
William Seton (1746–1798), was born in Scotland, a descendant of John Seton, 1st Baron Parbroath. His sister Jane married Walter Synnot of Ballymoyer House, County Armagh.

William emigrated to New York in 1758, and became superintendent and part owner of the iron-works of Ringwood, New Jersey. In 1765, he was elected an officer of the Saint Andrew's Society. He was a loyalist, and the last royal public notary for the city and province of New York during the war. He was a member of the Committee of One Hundred elected May 1, 1775, to control the affairs of the city and county of New York. Although was ruined financially at the close of the Revolution, but remained in New York, where he founded the import-export mercantile firm, the William Seton Company. When the Bank of New York was founded by Alexander Hamilton and others in opened 1784, Seton was the Cashier. His residence was at Hanover Square.

==== William Magee Seton ====
William (1768–1803) was born at sea on his parents return to America from a visit to England, aboard the ship Edward, on the 20th of April, 1768. His godfather was the wealthy merchant William Magee. From the age of ten, William was educated in England, and in 1788 visited important counting houses in Europe and became friends with Filippo Filicchi, a prominent merchant and trading partner in Leghorn, Italy. In 1793 the William Seton Company became Seton, Maitland, and Company. On January 25, 1794, William Magee Seton, aged 25, married Elizabeth Ann Bayley, daughter of physician Richard Bayley, first chief health officer of the City of New York, at St. Paul's Chapel, Samuel Provoost, Rector of Trinity Church presiding. Socially prominent in New York society, the couple soon took up residence on Wall Street. After the elder William Seton's death in 1798, they took in William's six younger siblings, which necessitated a move to a larger house on Stone Street.

The British blockade of France, and the loss of several of his ships at sea, led in 1801 to bankruptcy and the loss of the home at 61 Stone Street causing the family to relocate to 8 State Street in lower Manhattan. As their financial problems escalated, William Magee began to show signs of tuberculosis. Doctors recommended a trip to Italy for the warmer climate. In 1803, Seton, his wife, and eldest daughter sailed for Leghorn. where, as officials feared yellow fever then prevalent in New York, they were held in quarantine for a month. Conditions were cold and damp, and two weeks after release Seton died at the Filicchi home in Pisa on December 27 and was buried in the English cemetery in Leghorn. Seton and his wife had five children: Anna Maria (1795–1812), William II (1796–1868), Richard Seton (1798–1823), Catherine (1800–1891) and Rebecca Mary (1802–1816).

==== Lieutenant William Seton ====
William (1796–1868), and his siblings Richard, Rebecca, and Catherine, were left in the care of their aunt Rebecca Seton until their mother's return in June 1804. Rebecca died the following month. Their mother, who had become acquainted with Catholicism while abroad, converted in March 1805. Burke's Peerage (1900) recognized him as the head of the Seton family of Parbroath, senior cadets of the earls of Winton in Scotland.

The Filicchis arranged for William and his brother Richard to attend Georgetown College. By 1808, Mrs. Seton had moved to Baltimore where she hoped to open a school for girls. At her request, Bishop John Carroll, president of St. Mary's College, had the boys admitted there. One of their teachers was Simon Bruté. In 1822 while sailing with the United States Navy, Richard became infected with typhus as a result of nursing a victim of the disease. Richard died at the age of twenty-three off the coast of Liberia on board the ship USS Oswego and was buried at sea.

During 1815 and 1816, William was with the Filicchis in Italy, where he learned to speak Italian. In addition to Italian, he was fluent in French and Spanish. William was made a midshipman in the US Navy in 1817; he received a commission as lieutenant in February 1826. In July 1832 he married Emily Prime and resigned his commission shortly thereafter.
