= Beechwoods Cemetery (New Rochelle, New York) =

Cemetery in Westchester County, New York

Coordinates: 40°54′24″N 73°47′54″W

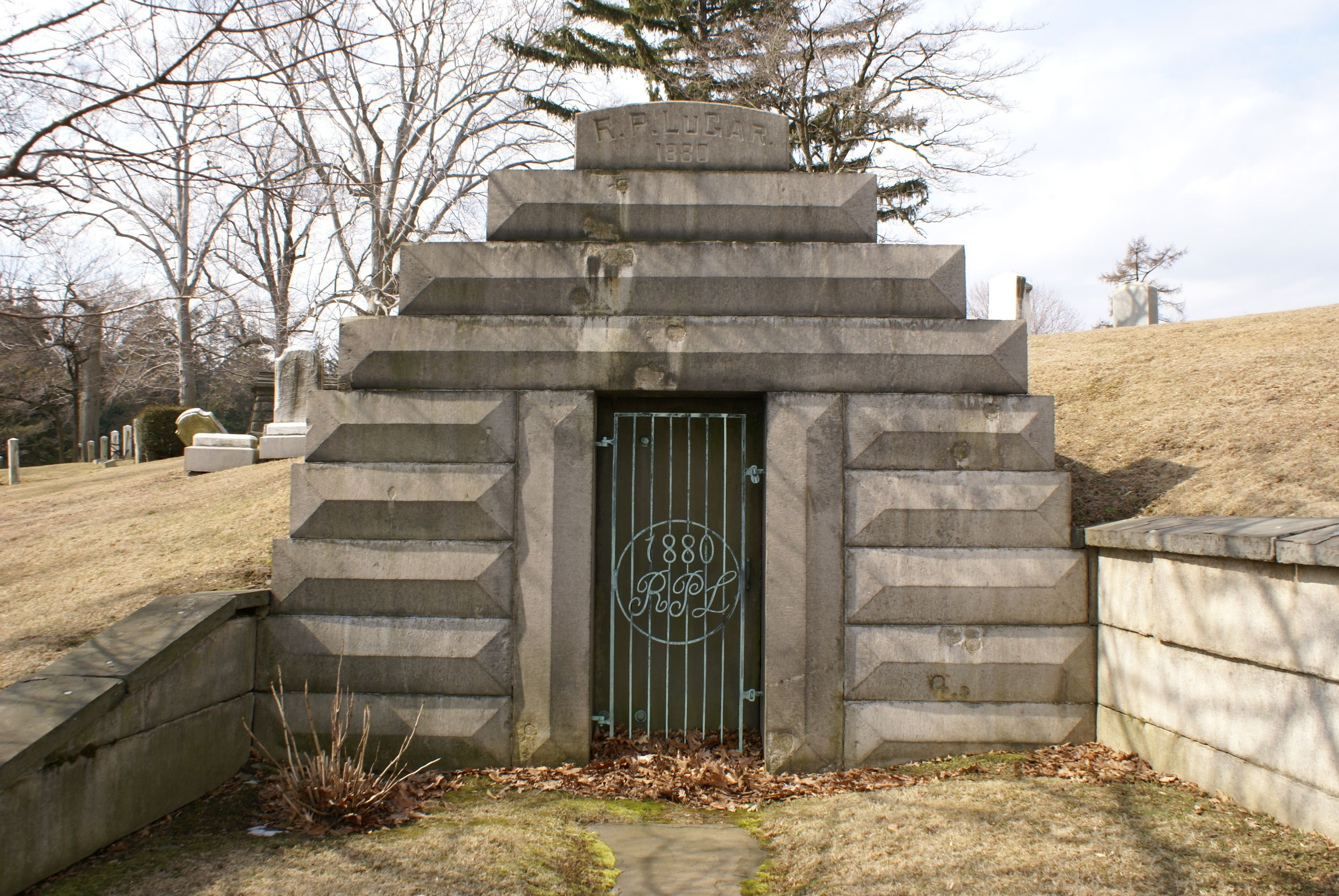

Beechwoods Cemetery is a non-denominational cemetery located in New Rochelle, New York, United States. The cemetery was incorporated in 1854.

== Notable interments ==
=== Medal of Honor recipients ===
- Robert Temple Emmet (1854–1936), Lieutenant in the American Cavalry, for action in the Indian Wars
- William B. Lewis (1847–1900), U.S. Cavalry sergeant in the Indian Wars

=== Others ===
- Nell Brinkley (1886–1944), the "Queen of Comics" illustrator and artist
- Montague Castle (1939–1867) Canadian-born American stained glass artist, businessman, and painter
- Ruth Chatterton (1892–1961), American actress, novelist and aviator (cremated remains)
- Thaddeus Davids (1810–1894), New York City businessman
- William T. Emmet (1869–1918), New York lawyer, Public Service Commissioner
- John Hunter (1788–1852), New York City merchant and landowner
- Lou Jones (1932–2006), 1956 Olympic Gold Medal athlete
- John Q. Underhill (1848–1907), U.S. Congressman
- Max Wertheimer (1880–1943), one of the founders of gestalt psychology

== See also ==
- Holy Sepulchre Cemetery (New Rochelle, New York)
