= Airplane Coaster =

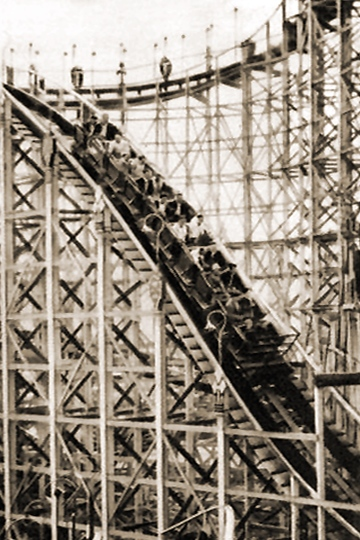
- The first drop of the Airplane Coaster

Playland
- Location: Playland
- Coordinates: 40°57′57″N 73°40′26″W
- Status: Removed
- Opening date: May 26, 1928
- Closing date: November 1957
- Cost: $200,000

General statistics
- Type: Wood
- Manufacturer: Frank W. Darling
- Designer: Frederick Church
- Height: 92 ft (28 m)
- Length: 3,500 ft (1,100 m)
- Speed: 40 mph (64 km/h)
- Trains: 10 cars; riders arranged 2 across in a single row for a total of 20 riders per train
- Airplane Coaster at RCDB

Airplane Coaster, known previously as the Aero-Coaster and the Aeroplane Dips, was a wooden roller coaster which operated at Playland Amusement Park in Rye, New York, United States, from 1928 until 1957.

== History and design ==
The Airplane Coaster was designed by noted roller coaster engineer Frederick Church. For many years it was believed, based on past collaborations and similar design, that Harry Traver of Traver Engineering had built the coaster, but in the 1980s it was determined that Traver was not the builder. A researcher, digging through a Rye, New York attic, discovered plans that listed the actual builder as Frank W. Darling, the owner of LaMarcus Adna Thompson's construction company.

Originally planned to be named "The Bobs" (like many of Church's other coasters), the coaster was first named "Aeroplane Dips" in honor of Charles Lindbergh's noted flight from New York to Paris. Over the next few years, the name was changed to "Aero-Coaster" and finally "Airplane Coaster" (although Aero-Coaster persisted among many as a nickname). The coaster was the largest built at Playland. It had multiple levels with many spirals, as well as steep drops and curves. Most commented on were the bottleneck curves where multiple tracks seemed to converge. It had many similarities in design elements to The Bobs at Riverview Park in Chicago.

=== Demolition ===
Maintenance issues doomed the Airplane Coaster. While it had early operational issues (the coaster took three days to get completely up and running), its late stage lifespan was particularly beset with problems. In 1956, when Playland changed insurance companies, inspectors condemned the coaster, stating it was unsafe. Renovations would have cost $100,000, so it was decided to demolish the coaster for a tenth of the cost instead. The coaster was torn down in November 1957.

== Ride experience and reception ==
The Airplane Coaster was quite popular, with unexpected drops, sharp turns, and sudden speed changes cited as especially thrilling elements. Although some locals at the time expressed wariness with a coaster that seemed too dangerous, many writers have since called it a "masterpiece". A number of other writers called it the greatest roller coaster ever built.
