= Edith Gwynne Read =

American environmentalist (1904 - 2006)

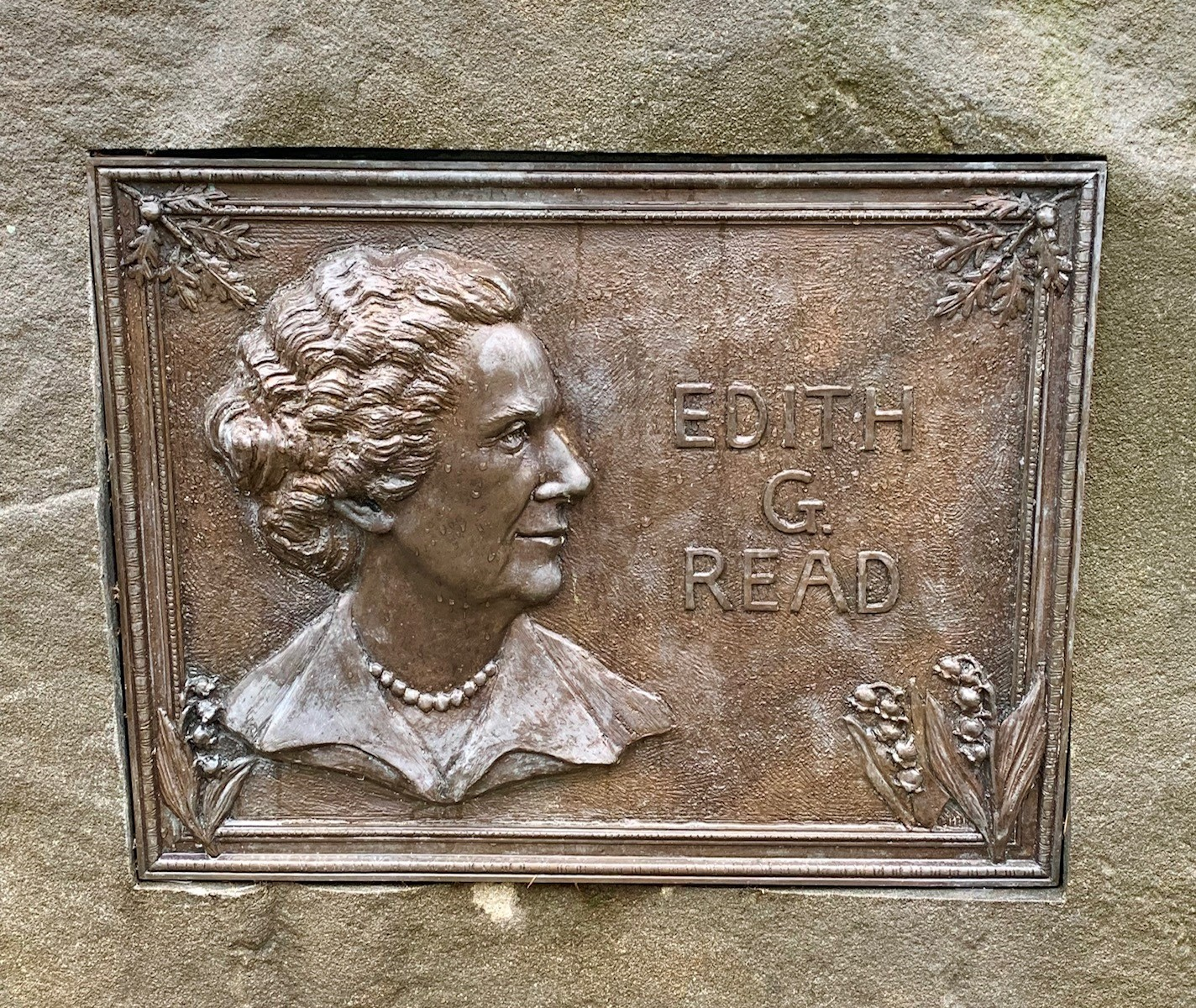
- Edith Gwynne Read dedication plaque at Read Wildlife Sanctuary, Rye
- Born: February 27, 1904; Rye, New York
- Died: April 26, 2006 (aged 102)
- Occupation: American environmentalist
- Spouse: Bayard Whitney Read

Edith Mathews Gwynne Read (February 27, 1904 - April 26, 2006) was an American environmentalist who helped preserve open space and protect watercourses and wetlands in Westchester County, New York, especially Rye. Her leadership led to the creation of the Rye Nature Center and the Edith G. Read Wildlife Sanctuary that bears her name.

== Personal life ==
Edith Mathews Gwynne, was the daughter of Edith Mathews and Arthur C. Gwynne, a broker, and the granddaughter of William Mathews. She was born in 1904 and grew up in Rye, New York. Edith was a graduate of Rye Country Day School and the Westover School, both single sex schools for girls.

She married financier Bayard Whitney Read in 1926 and they had two children. Edith and her family lived in the historic Indian Village and Dogwood Lane neighborhoods of Rye. Both of their homes were close to The Apawamis Club where they were active members and where Bayard Read served as president in 1940.

In 1942, Edith Read organized the Rye Unit of the Citizens'Committee for the Army and Navy to supply service men and women with care packages including knitted clothing items. In addition to her civic community service, Edith was an active member of the Garden Club of America and the Rye Garden Club where she served on its Conservation Committee.

Edith and Bayard shared a passion for the natural world and wildlife preservation. In 1950, they donated 22 acres of hemlock woodland to Greenwich Audubon. Shortly after this, Edith's husband Bayard took up wildlife photography. He was credited with producing the first natural history motion picture about the American bald eagle; it was produced for the Cornell Ornithology Institute and distributed by the National Audubon Society.

== Advocacy record ==
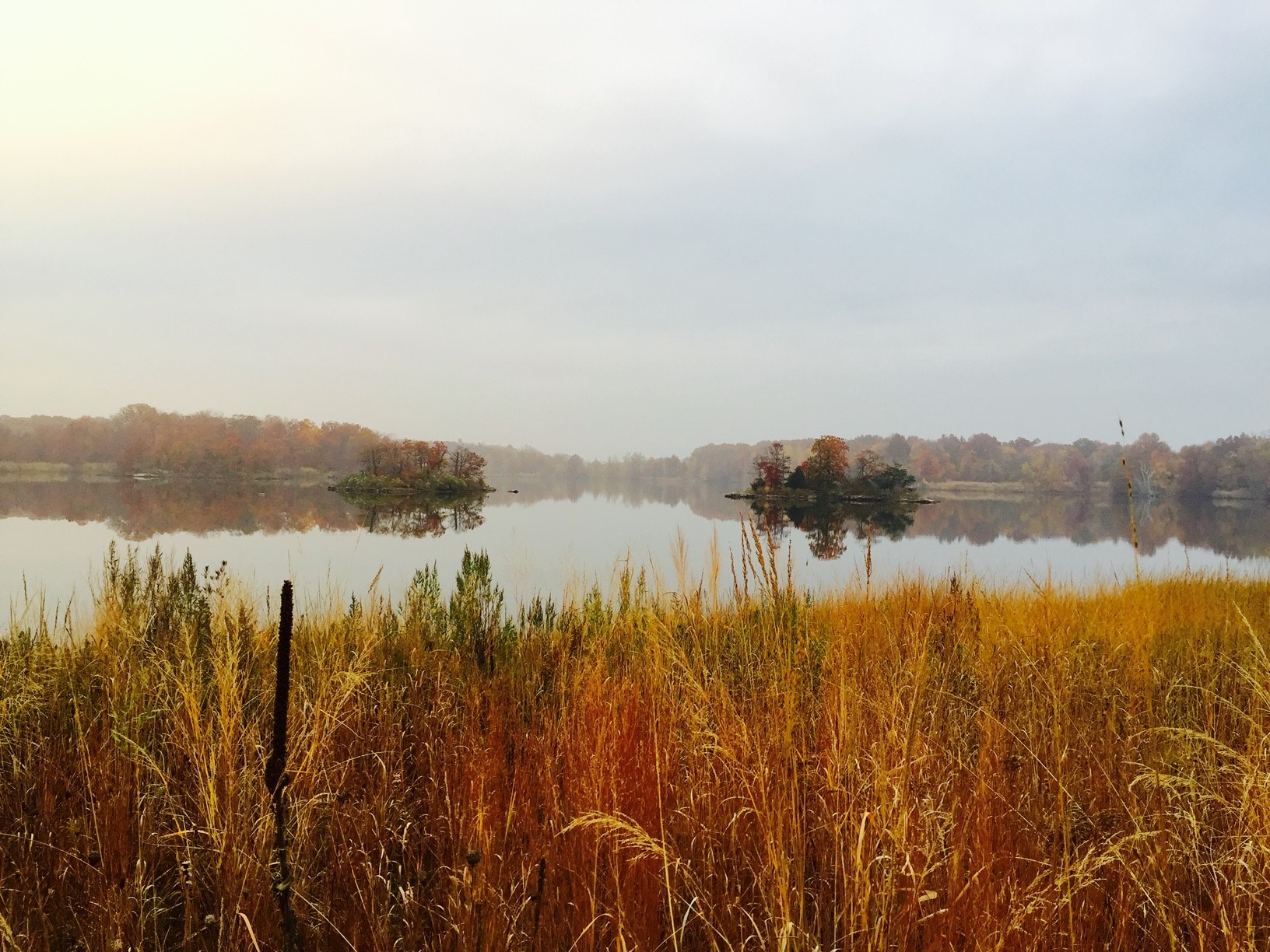
Playland Lake next to Edith G. Read Wildlife Sanctuary

Inspired by her husband's interest in ornithology and her father's penchant for public service, Edith Read became increasingly engaged in conservation. In the fall of 1955, she helped circulate a petition recommending a plan for the acquisition and rehabilitation of ruins and its property known as the Parsons Tract for re-use as a 33-acre preserve and educational park. Following her urging at a public hearing in December 1956, the City of Rye purchased the former Marselis Parsons estate to create the Rye Nature Center. Read served as Chairman of the Center for 10 years. In her concurrent role as Chairman of the Rye Parks Commission, she and her committee drafted a long range plan for the site. The document included the reconditioning of overgrown formal gardens, cleaning a pond and laying out walking trails.

In the 1960s, together with fellow members of the Rye garden clubs, Read also raised awareness about the detrimental impact of overzealous building in wetlands and water pollution in Westchester County. She warned that the Blind Brook was "in danger of even more pollution than at present because of the building of new multiple dwellings, many more housing developments, and the relocation of industrial plants in our area" an environmental concern that continues to this day. She spent more than 12 years helping to gather signatures for petition and writing letters to officials and local papers to halt potential development of two strategic parcels of land on the Rye Harrison border that were critical for flood protection. Read's successful efforts were lauded along with those of "the Little Garden Club of Rye, the Rye Garden Club, the Ceres Garden Club, the League of Women Voters and the Rye Conservation Society in insuring that open space and natural areas are preserved for the future. Their collective farsightedness has been instrumental in making the public increasingly aware of the necessity for conserving and preserving our natural resources."

Not surprisingly, when a Rye-Oyster Bay Bridge was proposed in the 1960s by Robert Moses, Read voiced her opposition to the project. Her stance was reinforced by family and fellow petitioners of the Rye Garden Club who also recognized the threat to Rye's air and water quality.

Read's work did not go unnoticed by her hometown. With her outstanding record for civic engagement, Read was appointed as a Rye City Councilwoman on January 2, 1974. She received the American Legion's 19th Americanism Award on Memorial Day in 1976. This was the same year that she became Chairman of Westchester County's Soil and Water Board in 1976 committing herself to protecting natural water resources. Fully familiar with the devastating impact of flooding in her own neighborhood where "drains 'spouted like geysers'" and "innumerable small streams" contributed to the problem, Read spearheaded a plan to prohibit new construction in the flood prone Blind Brook watershed areas of the City of Rye and adjacent towns of Harrison and Rye town. Her work included the investigation of adding strategic structures like water retention basins. Governmental officials including Congressman Richard Ottinger lauded Read's tenacity.

Edith Read battled Westchester County together with the Long Island Sound Task Force and Federated Conservationists of Westchester in a lengthy litigation aimed at halting dumping that was taking place in Rye along Long Island Sound near a portion of the historic Playland Amusement Park. Broken rides and refuse had been regularly dumped there for years along with garbage. Westchester County had plans to deposit dredged soil from the man made lake throughout the wildlife habitat. A resolution to protect the important bird area was finally reached in 1983 under the auspices of County Executive Andrew O'Rourke.

Read's passion for conservation extended outside of Westchester too. She was a major player in preserving wetlands in the Adirondacks Forest Preserve.

== Legacy ==
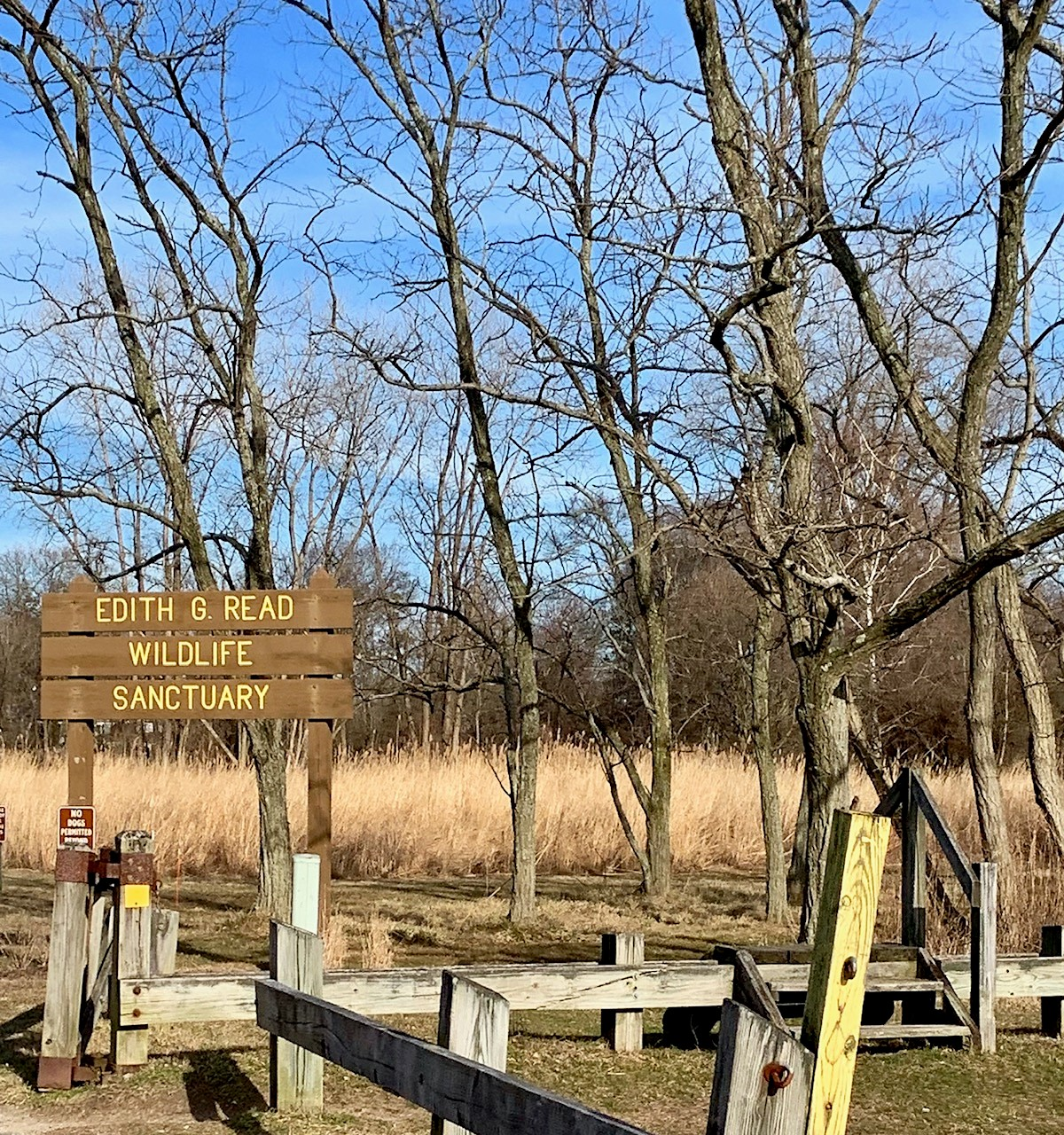
Edith G. Read Sanctuary Entrance next to Playland Amusement Park

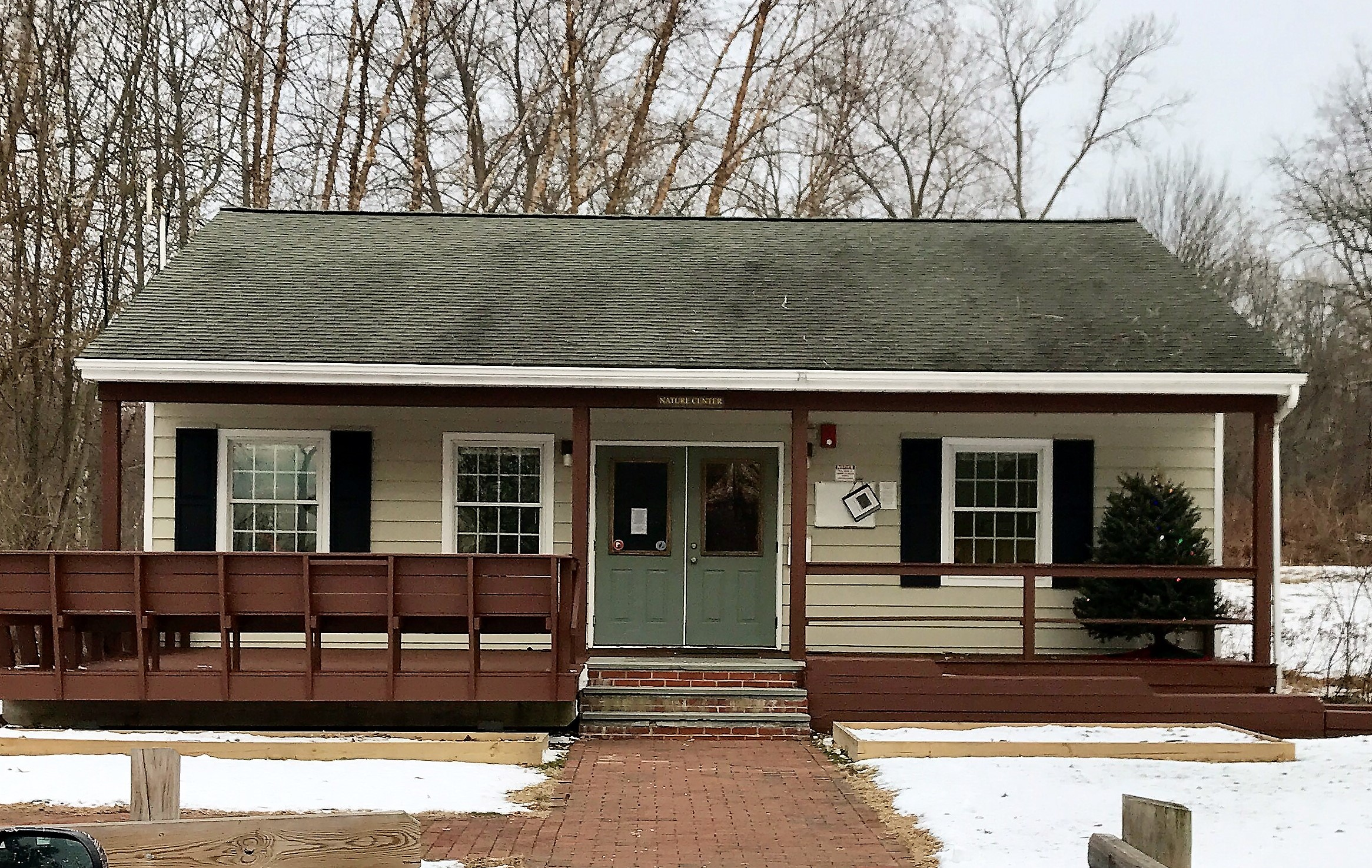
Nature Center at Edith Read Sanctuary, Rye, New York

In 1970, Read's two decades long commitment to conservation was recognized by the League of Women Voters with the creation of an Edith G. Read Award to be given annually to a Rye resident who does the most for conservation.

On June 17, 1978, Read's substantial efforts to create the Rye Nature Center were honored by naming the nature center's museum building after her.

Her most notable tribute however, following years of passionate advocacy, is embodied in the Edith Read Wildlife Sanctuary, which was dedicated as a "forever wild" natural park on October 5, 1985. Today the park is owned and operated by Westchester County Parks and supported by taxpayer dollars. An additional Friends of Edith Read Sanctuary assists with fundraising.

Edith died at 102 years old in 2006. On October 16, 2010, a plaque in her honor was unveiled at the sanctuary to recognize decades of Read's environmental stewardship.
