= Rye High School (New York) =

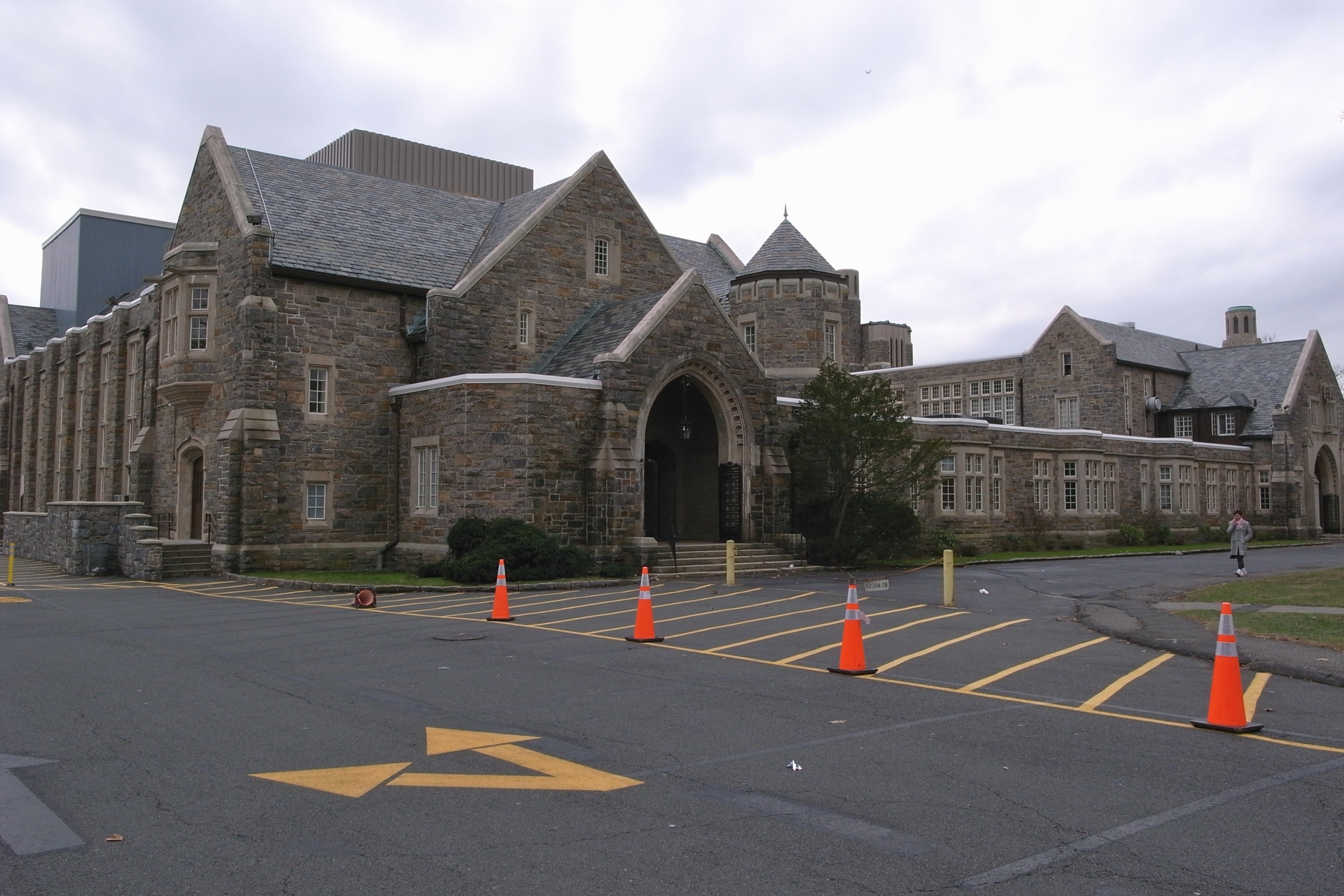
- Rye High School's Performing Arts Center's entrance

Location
- 1 Parsons Street; Hudson Valley; Rye, Westchester, New York 10580; United States; 40°58′24″N 73°41′13″W

Information
- School type: Public
- Status: Operating
- School district: Rye City School District
- CEEB code: 334970
- Principal: Andrew Hara
- Teaching staff: 89.77 (FTE)
- Grades: 9–12
- Enrollment: 905 (2023-2024)
- Student to teacher ratio: 10.08
- Colors: Garnet and Black
- Athletics: Section 1 (NYSPHSAA)
- Mascot: Garnet
- Rival: Harrison, NY
- Website: rhs.ryeschools.org

Rye High School is a public high school in Rye, New York, United States. Rye High School is the only high school in the Rye City School District. It shares a building with Rye Middle School.

== History ==
The school is accredited by the New York State Department of Education and the Middle States Association. The school is ranked the 252nd best high school in the US according to the U.S. News & World Report "Best High Schools" rankings.

Due to the abundance of garnets discovered during construction of the school, this precious gem became the adopted mascot.

== Campus ==
The high school itself was built during the Great Depression, as part of a public works project aimed at giving people work. Rye High School is designed in the style of Gothic architecture, constructed with dark stones, small recessed windows, and sloping roofs.

Several Rye Middle School classes are hosted in the high school building. In addition, seventh and eighth graders use the high school cafeteria for lunch during separate periods, while sixth grade students remain in the middle school building for both classes and lunch.

A $17 million initiative helped modernize the school by constructing a new science wing adjacent to the auxiliary gym on the north end of the campus. The new building contains 12 labs, workrooms, and numerous new facilities, among other things. The project was completed in 2015.

The campus hosts a football stadium with an outdoor track and spots for field events to be conducted, a baseball/softball field, practice fields for various sports (including lacrosse, soccer, field hockey, and cross country), a small brook separating the field from the rest of the school, parking lots, grassy fields, and a few trees.

== Curriculum ==
A graduation requirement of 60 hours of community service was implemented in 1989.

Though not a curricular requirement, as much as 89 percent of the student body participates in Advanced Placement (AP) courses. During the month of May, the school essentially shuts down while AP's are administered to students. Afterwards, students receive a five-day break from classes for their efforts. Unlike many other high schools, AP World History and AP European History is offered to students in the tenth grade, as opposed to only being offered in eleventh grade. This distinction allows students to essentially "try out" AP courses so they can gauge their ability to handle the heavy workload.

At graduation, many students have taken at least one Advanced Placement course, with some students taking in upwards of fifteen of these courses. In addition, several honors courses and one college credit class are offered to students who wish to challenge themselves academically. Recently the school has adopted a new focus on STEAM courses. The most recent example is the addition of the AP Computer Principles course, which ran for the first time in the 2018–2019 school year.

=== Graduation requirements ===
In order to receive a diploma from Rye High School, a student must meet several criteria by the time of graduation. These include, but are not limited to:

- Complete 60+ hours of community service
- Have taken 3+ years of foreign language
- Have taken a Participation in Government class
- Have taken an economics class
- Have 4 or more English credits
- Have 4 or more history credits
- Have at least 1 art credit
- Have 3 or more science credits
- Have 3 or more math credits

=== Athletics ===
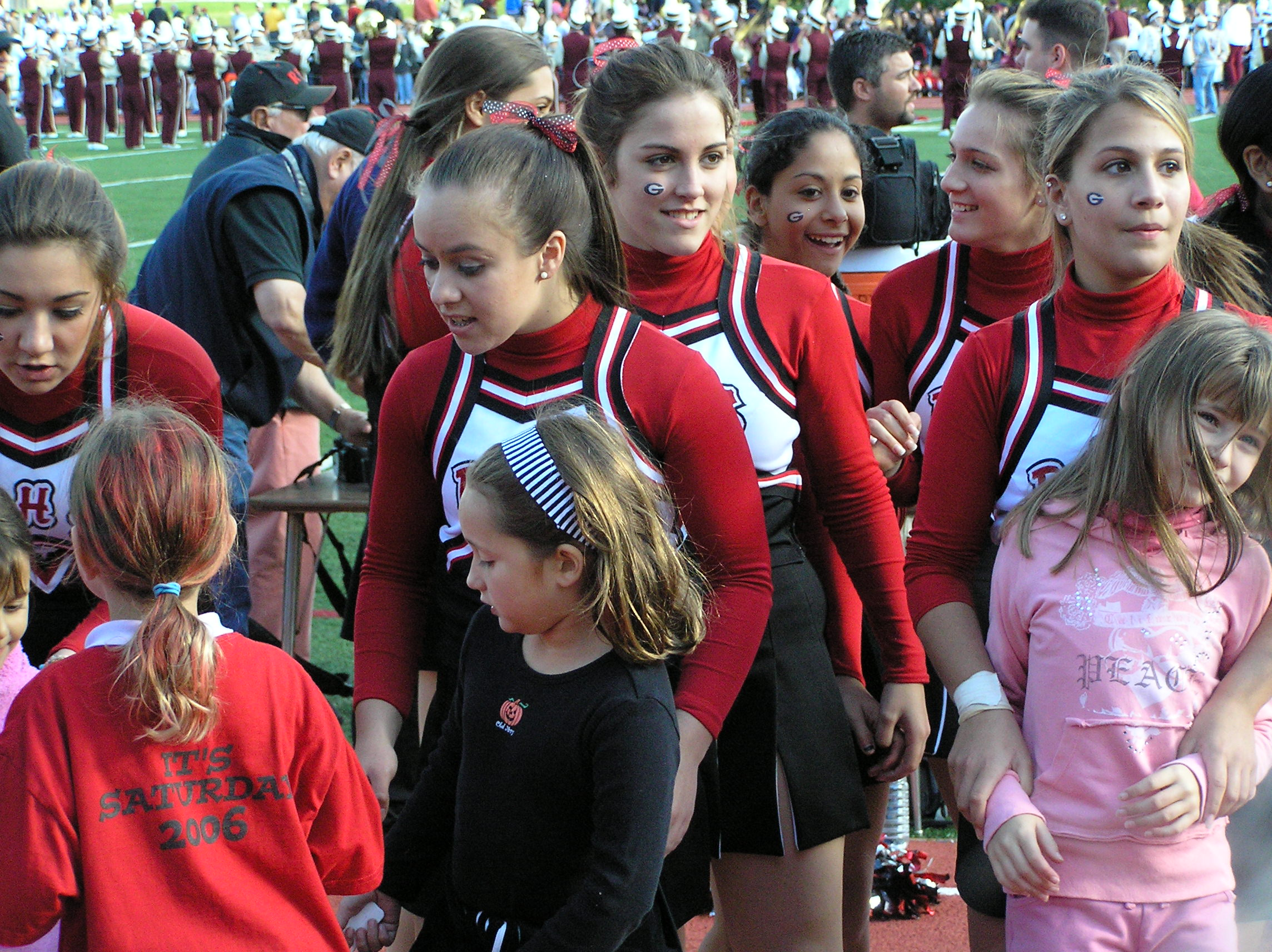
Rye High School football cheerleaders at Rye in 2006

Rye High School fields teams in baseball, softball, basketball, cheer-leading, cross country, crew, field hockey, football, rugby, golf, gymnastics, ice hockey, lacrosse, sailing, soccer, swimming, tennis, track and field, volleyball, and wrestling. As of 2025, the football team has won four state championships, including two in a row (2007, 2008). The basketball team won its league with a 17–6 record in 2009 and went to the Westchester County Center. The sailing team won the state championship in 2017 and the region's team race championship.

1n June 2017, the Rye High School Crew Team (coached by Stan Nelson) won the national championship at the USRowing Youth National Championships in Sarasota, Florida, in the Men's Youth Lightweight 4+, besting boats from Newport and Long Beach, California and St. Louis, Missouri, among others.

=== Hazing ===
Rye High School students had an underground tradition, well known by students and alumni, known as "Freshman Friday." In mid-2012, three Rye High School students were charged with kidnapping three freshmen, taking them to a remote location and hazing them, with one student requiring hospital treatment. The school repeatedly denied any knowledge of the event, despite the fact that many teachers interviewed about the incident did admit that they had knowledge of the event well before the proceedings occurred. After several adjournments, in October 2012 the felony assault charges against the three students were reduced to misdemeanor counts of hazing and unlawful imprisonment, with subsequent proceedings closed.

== Notable alumni ==
Alumni of Rye High School include:

- Greg Berlanti — television writer
- Steve Bodow — television writer
- Jennifer Donnelly — novelist
- Laurie Heineman — Emmy Award-winning actress
- Eric Junge — baseball player
- George Kirby — baseball player
- Michael Kirby — professor of drama and writer
- Frank S. McCullough — politician
- Adam Silver — lawyer and sports executive, NBA Commissioner since 2014
- B. J. Surhoff — baseball player
- Rich Surhoff — baseball player
- Ashley Williams — actress
- Kimberly Williams-Paisley — actress
