= Dragon Coaster (Playland) =

Wooden roller coaster in Rye, New York

Playland
- Location: Playland
- Coordinates: 40.967500°N 73.673900°W
- Status: Operating
- Opening date: 1929

General statistics
- Type: Wood
- Designer: Frederick Church
- Track layout: Triple out & back
- Lift/launch system: Chain lift
- Height: 24 m (79 ft)
- Drop: 23 m (75 ft)
- Length: 1,036 m (3,399 ft)
- Duration: 1:40
- Height restriction: 48 in (122 cm)
- Trains: 2 trains with 6 cars; riders arranged 2 across in 2 rows for a total of 24 riders per train
- Dragon Coaster at RCDB

The Dragon Coaster is a wooden roller coaster at Playland amusement park in Rye, New York. Opened in 1929, it was designed and built by amusement ride creator Frederick Church, the co-inventor of the Racing Derby, another early 20th century amusement park ride. The Dragon Coaster has approximately 3,400 feet of track and is, at its highest, approximately 80 feet tall. There is a tunnel along its span, a common feature of wooden roller coasters from the 1920s, that resembles the body and open mouth of a dragon. It was featured in the film Fatal Attraction, the Tom Hanks starring film Big, and the music video for Mariah Carey's song "Fantasy". The Dragon Coaster is still in operation.

== Ride experience ==
The coaster's name derives from the Dragon's mouth tunnel seen here.

The Dragon Coaster's boarding station is wrapped around the right leg of the layout. After climbing into the new Morgan trains, the operator pushes a lever to release the still used manual braking system. The trains roll down a short inclined curve toward the lift hill.

Once at the top, riders are given a quick view of the Long Island Sound before plunging down an abrupt dip which gives the train a rush of momentum. The train takes a quick left and proceeds down the main drop of about 80 ft. The train passes a few head-choppers as it passes under the lift hill, and then climbs up into a turn-around directly above the boarding station. The trains then proceed down a double-dip like drop. This momentum sends the train going into the mouth of a dragon.

As they enter the tunnel, a roaring sound-effect plays and the eyes of the dragon light up. The tunnel wraps around the turn off the lift hill's upper middle, and sends the riders out into the coaster's left leg.

The trains dip down out of the tunnel into a short straightaway, and then climb up into a turnaround at the far end of the left leg. The trains head back toward the center lift hill turn portion. After a few dips, the trains reach another turn around, directly under the dragon tunnel. They trains proceed back out into the left leg for one more out-and-back trip before heading toward the boarding station. Riders exit the trains; which are manually blocked by the operator, and exit the boarding station. The train then heads from the unload section to the load section.

The ride was master planned by Church to fit directly on top of the Old Mill ride; which he also designed. The ride's dips are consequently placed in clearings in between the Old Mill's tunnels, and some dips dive up over the tunnels. Both are veteran attractions from the opening day, and have shared the same plot of land for almost a century.

== Historical preservation ==
The Dragon Coaster's boarding station at night

The coaster, along with other historic rides at Playland like the Derby Racer (1927), is a contributing component to the site's National Historic Landmark status. A marker on the wall of the loading station lists the ride as one of the original attractions at Playland. The ride is still being manually braked, a feat few coasters can claim today. The ride ran using the original flanged wheel trains until the early 1980s, when the lack of rare parts forced management to switch them out with Morgan Manufacturing trains. These trains are also in use on the two Giant Dipper roller coasters in California, (San Diego and Santa Cruz respectively) the only other roller coasters designed by Church still in operation.

An original train car is mounted across the path from the entrance, next to the on-ride photo purchase booth, so visitors can sit down and take pictures.

The Dragon Coaster was closed during the park's 2025 season. It was renovated in 2026, reopening that year.

== In popular culture ==
- The coaster was featured in Mariah Carey's 1995 video for "Fantasy".
- Glenn Close and Ellen Latzen ride the roller coaster in the 1987 thriller Fatal Attraction.
