= Rye City School District =

School district in New York State

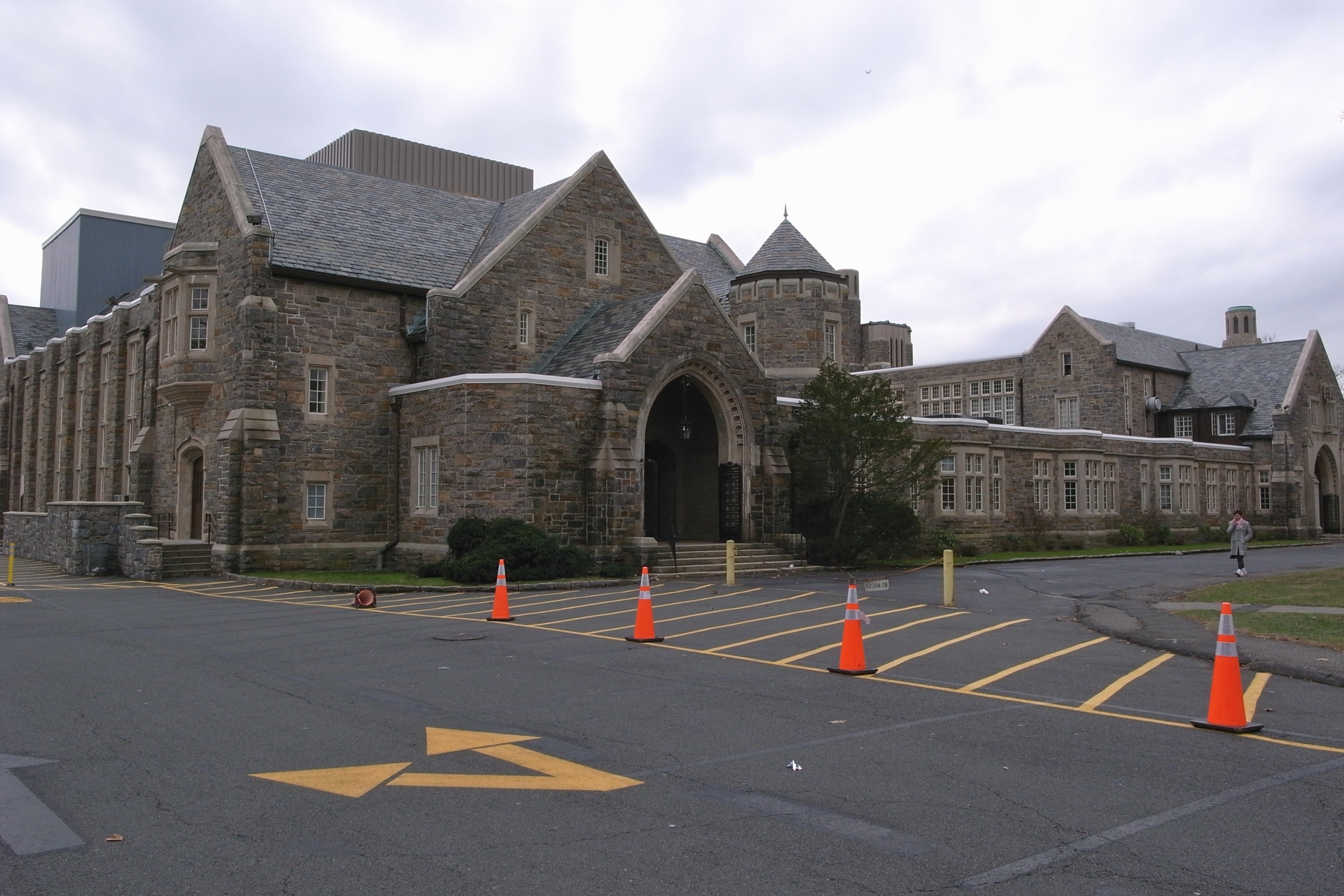
Rye High School

Rye City School District (RCSD) is a school district headquartered in Rye, New York.

It includes most of the City of Rye.

== History ==
Eric Byrne became the superintendent in 2017.

After the COVID-19 pandemic in New York State, in 2021 the district resumed its traditional in-person education program.

== Schools ==
Secondary

- Rye High School
- Rye Middle School

Elementary

- Midland School
- Milton School
- Osborn School
