= Rye, New York =

City in New York, United States

- City
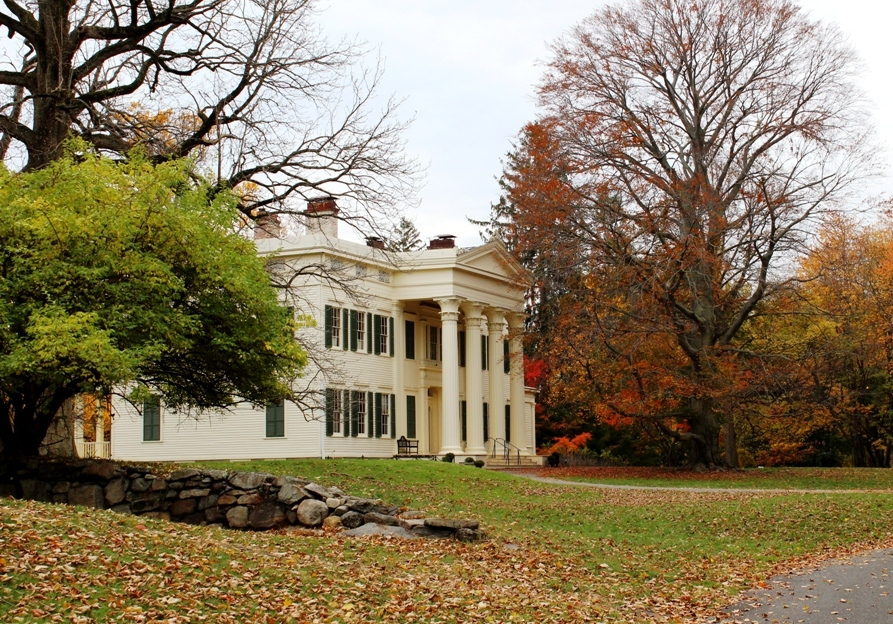
- Jay Estate is the childhood home of American Founding Father John Jay.

- Seal

- Location in Westchester County and the state of New York
- Interactive map of Rye
- Coordinates: 40°58′52″N 73°41′02″W
- Country: United States
- State: New York
- County: Westchester
- Incorporated (as a village): 1904
- Reincorporated (as a city): 1942

Government
  - Type: Council-Manager
  - Mayor: Josh Nathan
  - City manager: Brian Shea
  - City council: Members' List: • Marion Anderson; • James Ward; • Josh Nathan; • Jamie Jensen; • Amy Kesavan; • Keith Cunningham

Area
  - Total: 20.02 sq mi (51.86 km^{2})
  - Land: 5.85 sq mi (15.16 km^{2})
  - Water: 14.17 sq mi (36.70 km^{2})

Population (2020)
  - Total: 16,592
  - Density: 2,835/sq mi (1,094.6/km^{2})
- Time zone: UTC−05:00 (EST)
  - Summer (DST): UTC−04:00 (EDT)
- ZIP Code: 10580
- Area code: 914
- FIPS code: 36-64309
- Website: http://www.ryeny.gov/

Rye is a city in Westchester County, New York, United States, within the New York City metropolitan area. As of the 2020 census, Rye had a population of 16,592. It received its charter as a city in 1942, making it the most recent such charter in the state. The city has an area of 5.85 square miles.

Rye is notable for its waterfront, and two National Historic Landmarks (NHLs). The first NHL is the Boston Post Road Historic District, designated in 1993. It is also the only National Historic Landmark District (NHLD) in Westchester County, and includes the Jay Estate, the childhood home and final resting place of John Jay, a Founding Father and the first Chief Justice of the United States, Marshlands Conservancy, Rye Golf Club, Lounsbury and the Jay Cemetery. The second NHL in Rye is Playland, a historic amusement park designated in 1987, which features one of the oldest wooden roller coasters in the Northeast, the Dragon Coaster.

== History ==
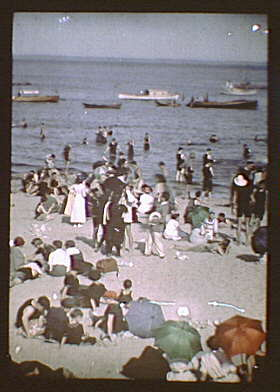
Rye Beach, early 20th century

Rye was once a part of Fairfield County, Connecticut, belonging to the Sachem Ponus, of the Ponus Wekuwuhm, Canaan Parish, and was probably named for that chieftain, "Peningoe Neck".

It was founded in 1660 by three men: Thomas Studwell, Peter Disbrow, and John Coe. Later prominent landowners included John Budd and family. Rye officially became part of the Province of New York and Westchester County in 1683 when Connecticut Colony ceded the town as part of a boundary agreement, though a final legal dispute over the boundary was not fully resolved until 1700. (Rye attempted to secede from New York and rejoin the Connecticut Colony in 1697. This brief rebellion, known as the "Revolt of Rye," lasted until 1700.)

During the 19th and early 20th centuries it was a haven for wealthy Manhattanites who traveled by coach or boat to escape the city heat. Its location on Long Island Sound and numerous beaches also appealed to visitors with more moderate means who gravitated for short stays at cottages and waterfront hotels.

It is noted for having many buildings with architectural distinction that help visually articulate specific neighborhoods and districts.

== Geography ==
According to the United States Census Bureau, the city has a total area of 20.0 square miles (52 km^{2}), of which 5.9 sq mi (15 km^{2}) is land and 14.2 sq mi (37 km^{2}) is water.

Rye is "situated in the eastern part of central Westchester County on Long Island Sound. The western border of the City generally parallels Beaver Swamp Brook, while the eastern border is formed by Milton Harbor and the Sound. Blind Brook traverses the City from the northwest corner of Rye to Milton Harbor at the southern end."

=== Rock and wetlands ===
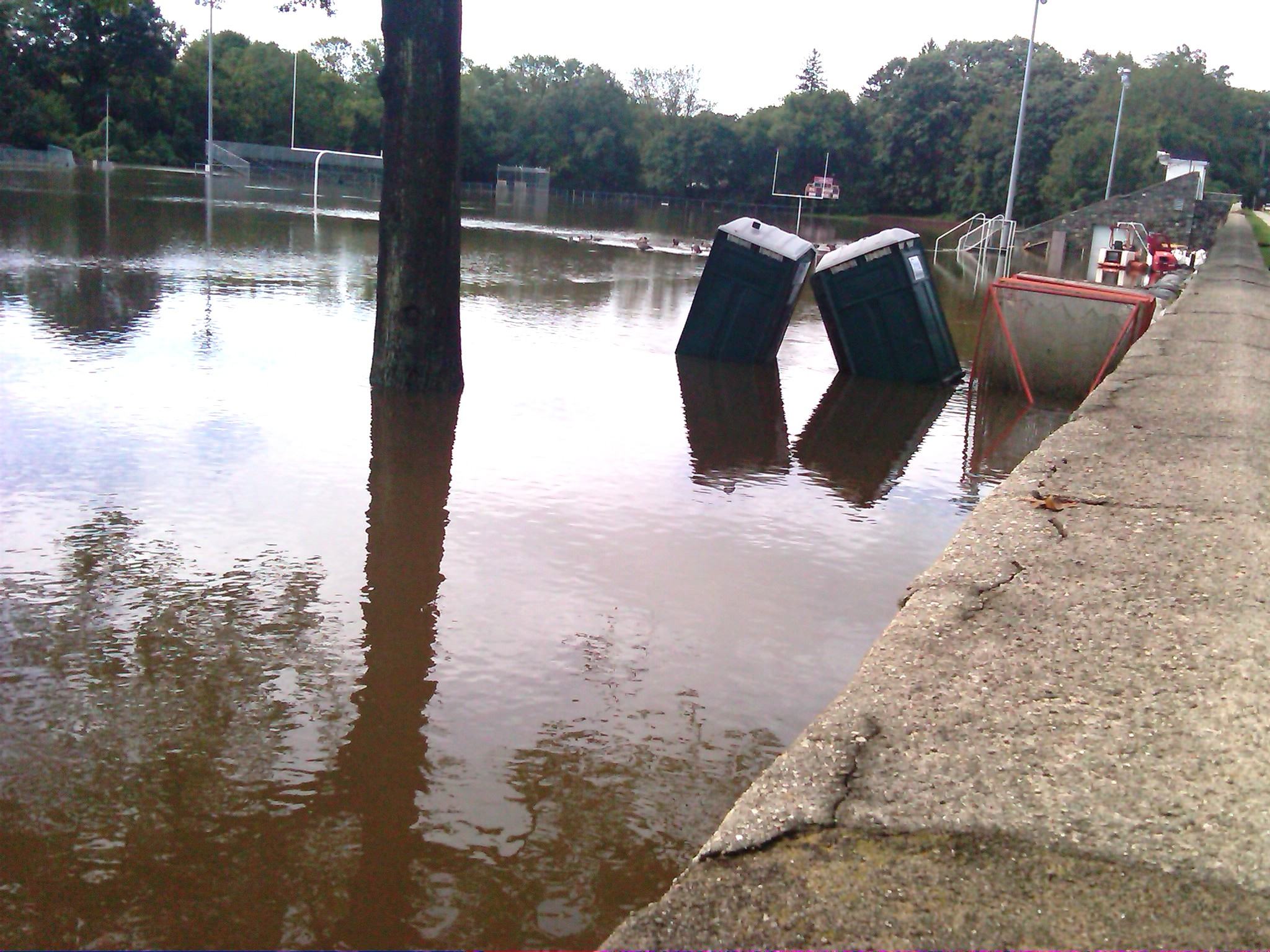
Rye High football field flooded in 2011

The geology and hydrology of Rye is characterized by a significant quantity of rock, marshes and wetlands which makes the city both desirably scenic but also challenging for developers.

Rye's bedrock is predominantly constituted of Fordham gneiss and Harrison diorite also known as Byram Black granite.

According to Rye's 1985 Master Plan, "Rye contains a variety of environmentally significant areas. Numerous tidal and freshwater wetlands are found near the waterfront and brooks. The Milton Harbor area (including the Marshlands Conservancy and Rye Golf Club), Disbrow Park and the Manursing area contain the most extensive wetlands in the City. In addition, substantial areas near the Sound, Milton Harbor, Blind Brook and Beaver Swamp Brook are within the 100 year flood hazard area, and thus subject to potential flooding." According to the City of Rye, "Considerable acreage of these important natural resources has been lost or impaired by draining, dredging, filling, excavating, building, polluting and other acts inconsistent with the natural uses of such areas. Remaining wetlands are in jeopardy of being lost, despoiled or impaired by such acts contrary to the public safety and welfare." As a result, the city has charged itself with the responsibility of "preventing the despoilation and destruction of wetlands and watercourses while taking into account varying ecological, economic, recreational and aesthetic values. Activities that may damage wetlands or watercourses should be located on upland sites in such a manner as not to degrade these systems."

In 2017, Rye resident and then New York State Senator George Latimer noted that wetlands maps for the area have not been updated in over 20 years

=== Flooding ===
Flooding has long been an issue in Rye as in other coastal towns with water coming in from Long Island Sound. The Blind Brook watershed is also a source of that flooding with significant deluges recorded in the neighborhood of Indian Village after four days of rain in October 1975.

Three major weather events in just five years produced catastrophic damage in the town.

- Following major flooding in March 2007, the April 2007 nor'easter six weeks later left some homes in Rye with over five feet of floodwater.
- In 2011, the after effects of Hurricane Irene in August and Hurricane Maria in September included swelling of Blind Brook and submersion of private and commercial properties including the Rye Nature Center, Indian Village, the Rye High football field, businesses on Purchase Street and homes on Milton and Highland Roads.
- Storm surges from Hurricane Sandy in 2012 resulted in evacuations of many coastal residences and facilities including the Milton firehouse.

The city's response to these recurring hazards was to apply for funding through the NY Rising Community Reconstruction Program. Rye received $3,000,000 to safeguard the city against future flooding threats, upgrade its infrastructure for resiliency, identify stormwater mitigation solutions, and protect historic buildings and natural wetlands.

Starting on September 1, 2021, Rye experienced another substantial flooding event. The storm lasted two days and caused significant damage to municipal facilities, businesses and residences. Areas around Indian Village and other sections of the city that had previously flooded during Hurricane Irene were under 8–9 feet of water. Other areas around the town normally not affected by flooding were also affected. Prior to the flooding event, Rye had undergone approximately five inches of rainfall from Hurricane Henri. Two weeks later, the remnants of Hurricane Ida dropped another 8–9 inches of rain in the area within a 12-hour period. Hurricane Ida remnants caused flooding in Rye nearly 10 years to the day from Hurricane Irene.

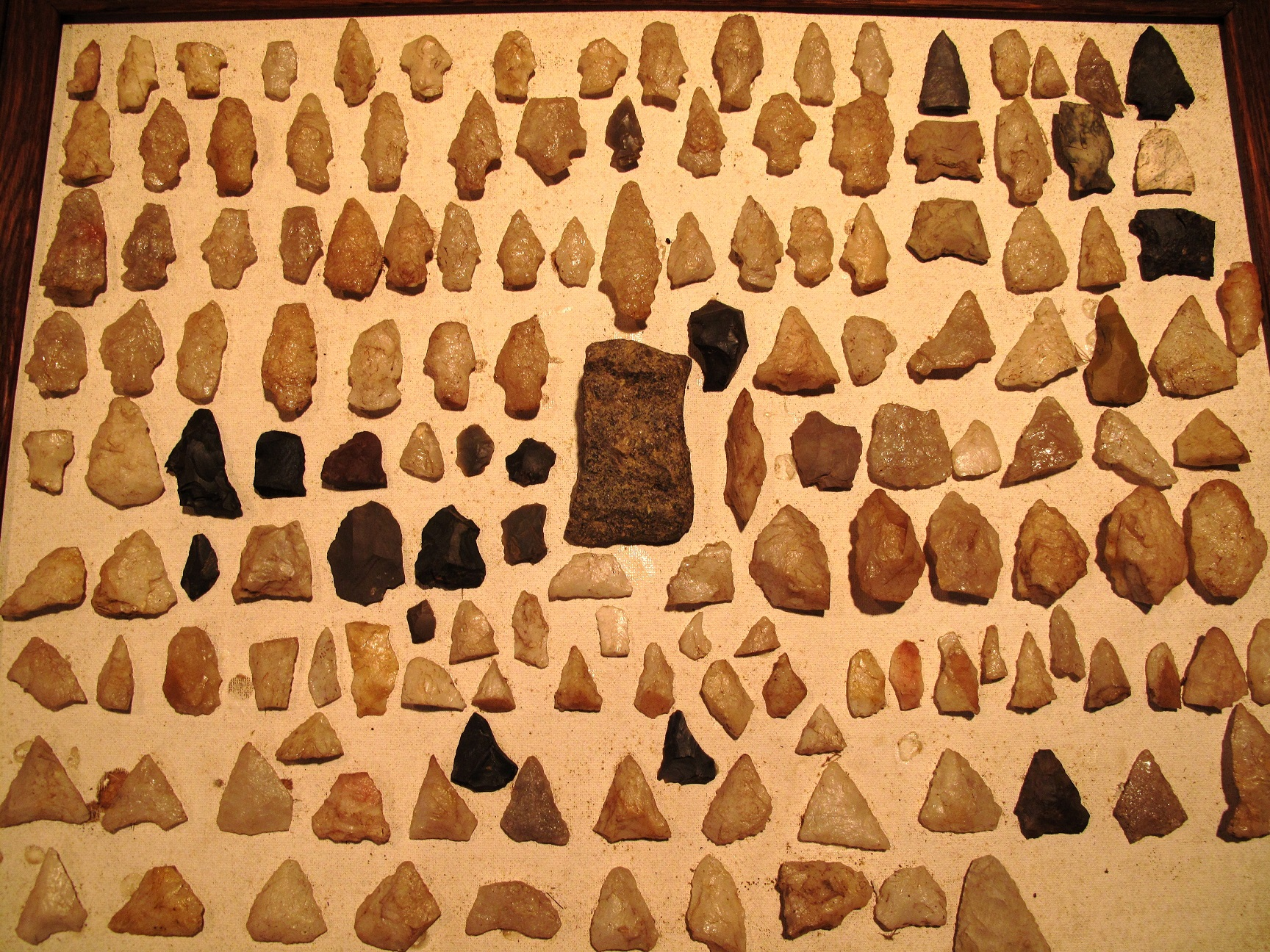
Rye Marshlands archaeological artifacts.

=== Indigenous artifacts ===
As of 2010, 75 percent of the acreage in Rye had been determined to be archaeologically sensitive with many Indigenous contact sites. At least two villages have been determined to have existed. Unearthed artifacts include implements, bones, pottery, skeletons, and a burial ground at the site of the present Playland Casino.

=== Neighborhoods ===
Many of Rye's unique neighborhoods are defined in the 1985 Master Plan. Many have historic significance and their preservation was signaled as important for enhancing Rye's character. They include:

Proposed National Register District

- Soundview Park
- Church Row

Local or National Register Significance

- Dogwood/Upper Dogwood Lane
- Grace Church Street Area
- Milton Harbor
- Kirby Mill
- Post Road Old Cottage District
- Central Business District
- Dublin (West Rye)
- Greenhaven
- Indian Village
- Loudon Woods
- Rye Town Park
- Hix Park

== Demographics ==
Historical population
Census	Pop.	Note	%±
1910	3,964		—
1920	5,308		33.9%
1930	8,712		64.1%
1940	9,865		13.2%
1950	11,721		18.8%
1960	14,225		21.4%
1970	15,869		11.6%
1980	15,083		−5.0%
1990	14,936		−1.0%
2000	14,955		0.1%
2010	15,720		5.1%
2020	16,592		5.5%
U.S. Decennial Census

=== 2020 census ===
As of the 2020 census, Rye had a population of 16,592. The median age was 42.3 years. 29.6% of residents were under the age of 18 and 16.5% of residents were 65 years of age or older. For every 100 females there were 93.8 males, and for every 100 females age 18 and over there were 88.4 males age 18 and over.

100.0% of residents lived in urban areas, while 0.0% lived in rural areas.

There were 5,654 households in Rye, of which 43.2% had children under the age of 18 living in them. Of all households, 64.6% were married-couple households, 10.1% were households with a male householder and no spouse or partner present, and 22.7% were households with a female householder and no spouse or partner present. About 23.0% of all households were made up of individuals and 15.5% had someone living alone who was 65 years of age or older.

There were 6,038 housing units, of which 6.4% were vacant. The homeowner vacancy rate was 1.2% and the rental vacancy rate was 7.2%.

Racial composition as of the 2020 census
Race	Number	Percent
White	13,322	80.3%
Black or African American	199	1.2%
American Indian and Alaska Native	34	0.2%
Asian	1,189	7.2%
Native Hawaiian and Other Pacific Islander	5	0.0%
Some other race	423	2.5%
Two or more races	1,420	8.6%
Hispanic or Latino (of any race)	1,388	8.4%

=== Demographic estimates ===
According to Census Bureau QuickFacts, 74.8% of residents age 25 and over had a bachelor's degree or higher, and 51.7% of residents were female.

== Economy ==
The headquarters of Jarden and GAMCO Investors are located in Rye.

== Arts and culture ==
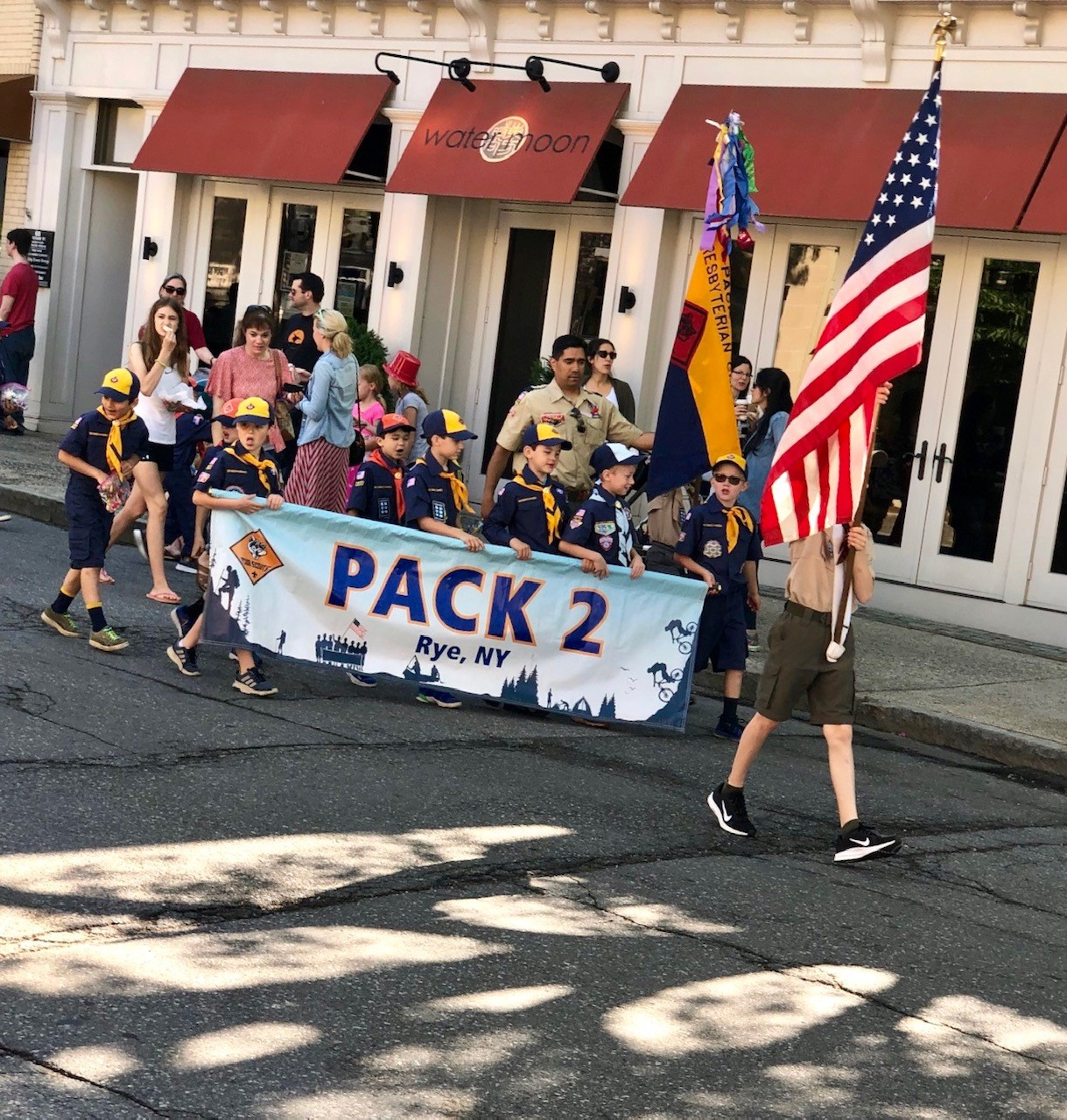
Memorial Day Parade

=== Historic sites ===
==== National Historic Landmarks ====
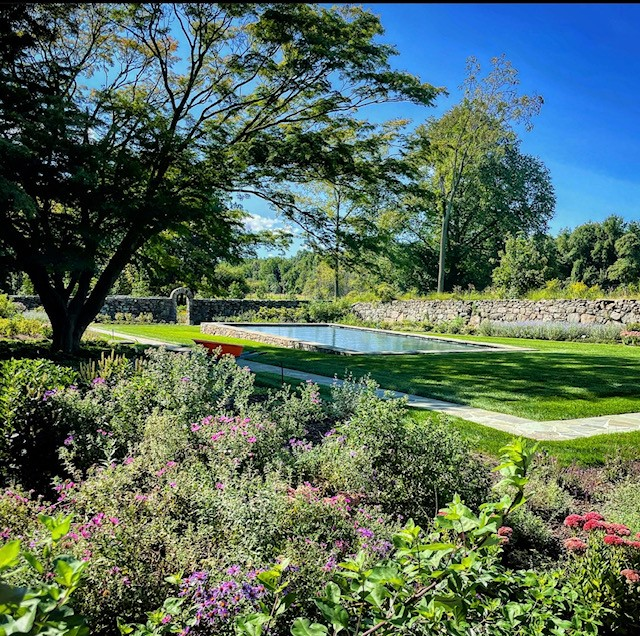
Jay Gardens sensory room and reflecting pool

The wooden Dragon Coaster at Playland Amusement Park, a National Historic Landmark founded in 1927.

Boston Post Road Historic District, a National Historic Landmark District and former home of John Jay, includes five historically significant parcels:

- Marshlands Conservancy, part of original Jay Estate.
- Jay Estate, a 23-acre (9.3 ha) park with gardens operated by the Jay Heritage Center.
- The Jay Cemetery (established 1805)
- Lounsbury (1836–1838)
- Whitby Castle and Rye Golf Club (1852–54)

Playland, opened in 1928, is a 279-acre (113 ha) theme park which features rides, games, an indoor skating rink, beach, boardwalk, and concession stands. It is one of only two amusement parks in the United States designated a National Historic Landmark. Its wooden roller coaster, Dragon Coaster, built in 1929, is one of the last roller coasters built by Frederick Church still operating. The Derby Racer, also built by Church, is one of only two rides of its kind in the US and one of three remaining in the world.

==== Sites on the National Register of Historic Places ====
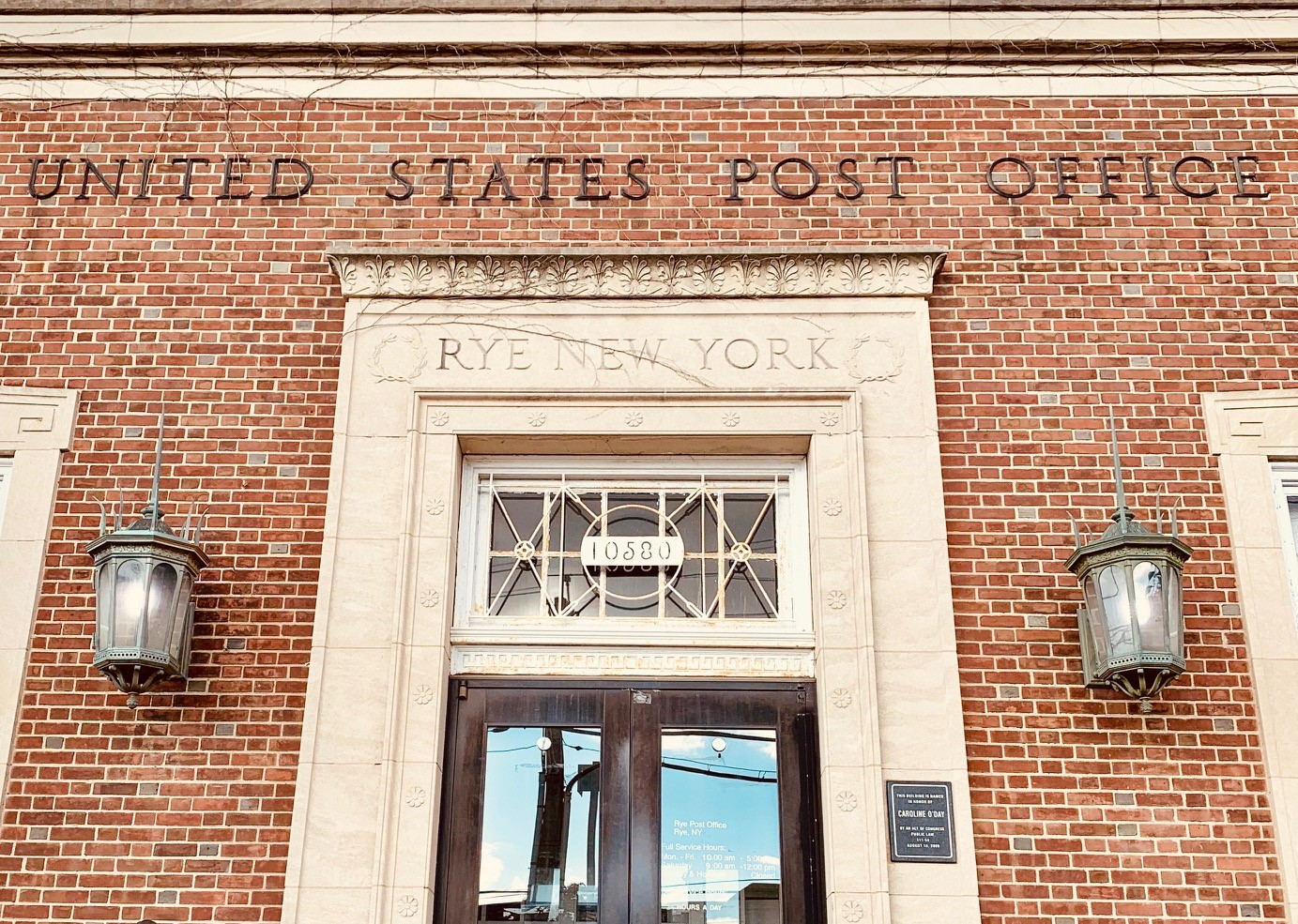
Rye Post Office dedicated to Caroline O'Day

==== Other historic sites ====
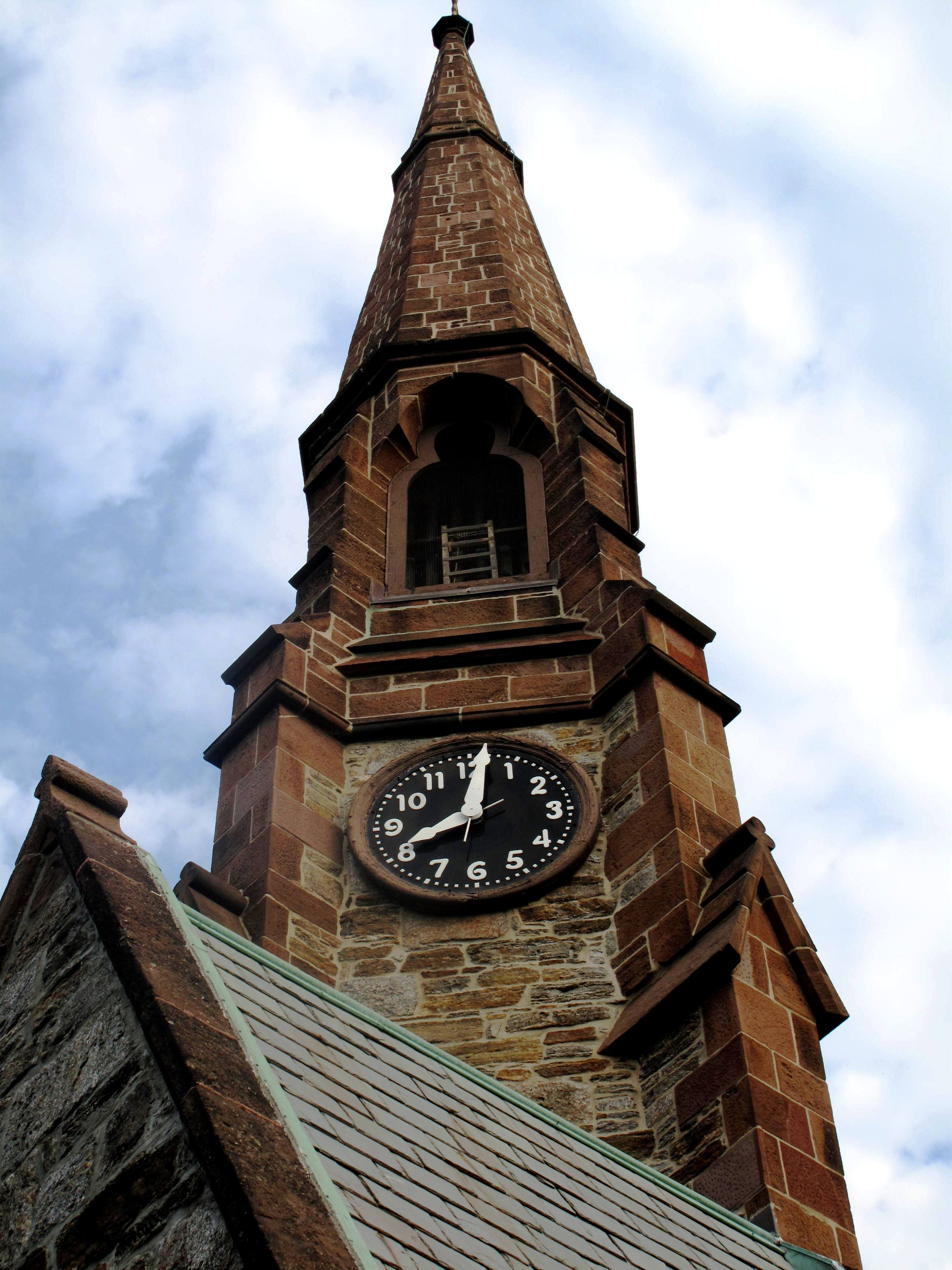
Christ's Church clock tower Rye

- Two 200 plus year old milestones labelled 24 and 25 on the Boston Post Road, the oldest thoroughfare in the United States. These sandstone markers likely date from when the Westchester Turnpike was configured
- A 1938 WPA mural by realist Guy Pene du Bois located in the city's post office lobby and titled John Jay at His Home.
- Two of the 16 sites on the African American Heritage Trail of Westchester County: The Rye African-American Cemetery and the Jay Estate.
- Wainwright House (1928), a 5-acre (2.0 ha) estate with gardens and central building commissioned by US Congressman J. Mayhew Wainwright. In 1951, the property was re-purposed as a religious center.
- Greenwood Union Cemetery – founded in 1837
- Rye African-American Cemetery – established in 1860
- Christ's Church (Episcopal) – established in 1695 as Grace Church; current building erected in 1866
- Church of the Resurrection

== Parks and recreation ==
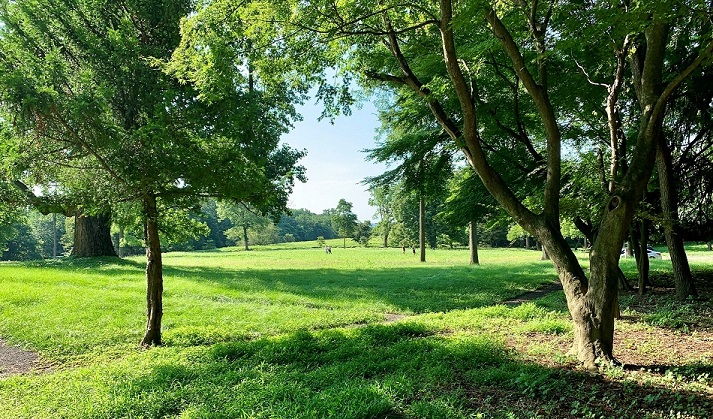
Jay Meadow, Rye, NY

=== Parks and nature reserves ===
Rye has over 454 acres (184 ha) of green open space, as well as coastline.

- Edith G. Read Wildlife Sanctuary (179 acres) established in 1985.
- Rye Nursery Park – acquired "for wetland restoration and park uses".
- Rye Town Park – opened in 1909.

=== Private and public clubs ===
Rye has numerous private country clubs, many of which were formed in the late 19th and early 20th century. The combined acreage of these clubs affords members and guests over 993 acres of recreation.

- American Yacht Club (founded in 1883) – sailing, tennis, paddle
- The Apawamis Club (1890) – golf, squash, tennis, paddle, swimming
- Rye Golf Club (1921) and Ryewood) – golf, swimming
- Westchester Country Club (1922) – golf, tennis, squash, paddle, swimming, beach

=== Recreation facilities ===
- Disbrow Park (51 acres) – tennis, baseball; dedicated as a park in 1930
- Rye Golf Club (126 acres) – golf, swimming; course designed by Devereux Emmet in 1921

== Government ==
The mayor is Josh Nathan. City council is composed of the mayor and six council members. The city manager is Brian Shea.

== Education ==
=== Public schools ===
Most of the city is in the Rye City School District. Rye is served by three public elementary schools: Osborn, Milton, and Midland.

Rye Middle School and Rye High School are part of the same campus, and the two buildings connect.

The Greenhaven and The Preserve at Rye neighborhoods of the City of Rye are served by the Rye Neck School District. Rye Neck High School and Middle School are on one campus also located partially in the City of Rye.

=== Private schools ===
- Rye Country Day School, Pre-K through 12th grade, a college preparatory school

== Media ==
- MyRye.com
- The Rye Record – community paper founded in 1997.

=== Filming location ===
- Episodes of Dickinson were filmed at the Jay Heritage Center in 2021.
- Playland appeared in the films Fatal Attraction and Big.

== Infrastructure ==
=== Transportation ===
The Rye train station provides commuter rail service to Grand Central Terminal in New York City or Stamford and New Haven-Union Station via the Metro-North Railroad's New Haven Line. The Bee-Line Bus System provides bus service to Rye.

=== Police department ===
Rye Police Department has 36 sworn police officers. The Rye Auxiliary Police is an all-volunteer force that provides assistance when needed. The Westchester County Police also patrol areas of Rye. New York State Police patrols Interstate 95 and 287, and MTA Police patrol the Rye Train station and property within the Metro North right-of-way.

=== Fire Department ===
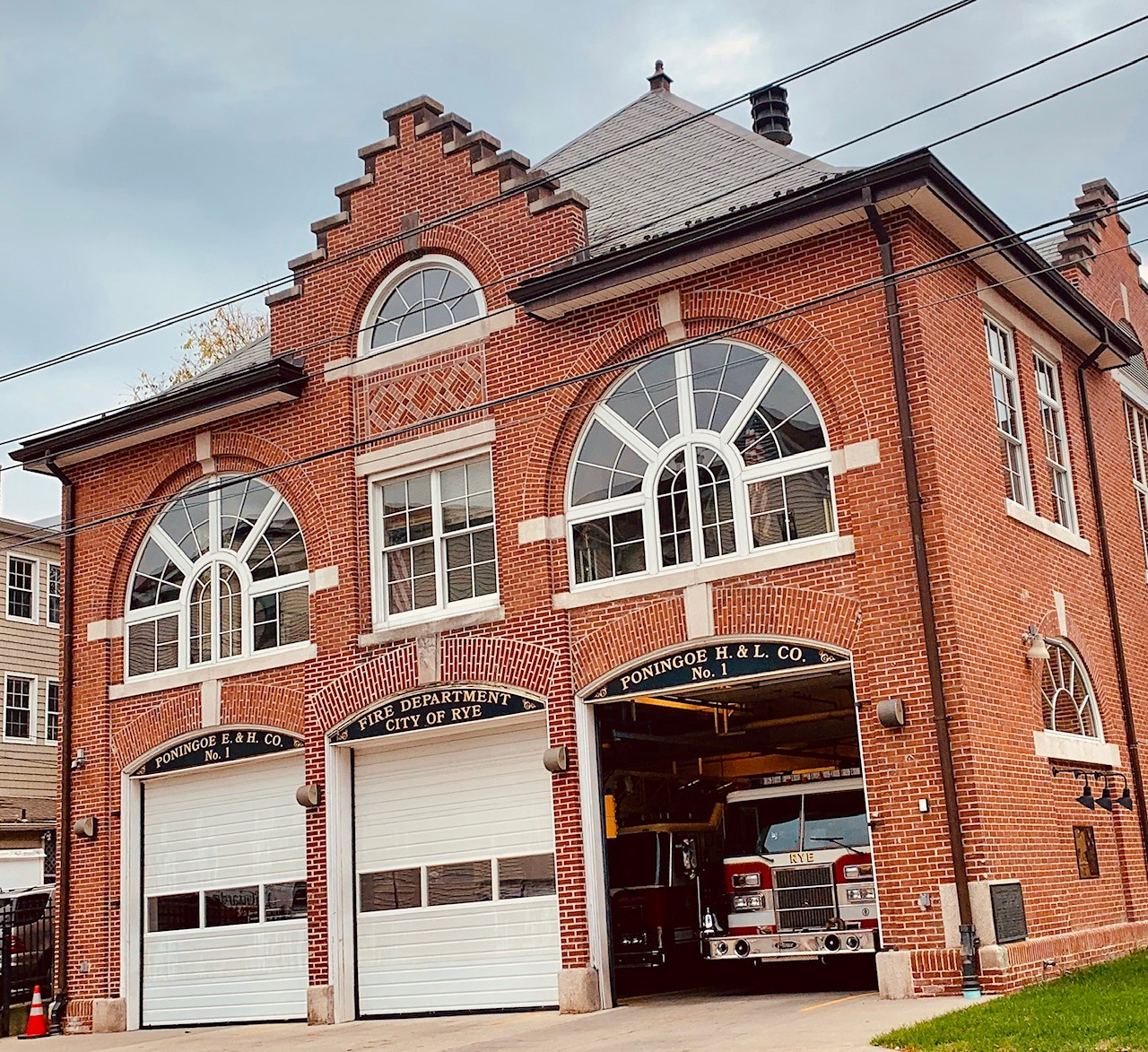
Rye Fire Department Station One, Fire Headquarters

The City of Rye Fire Department is staffed 24 hours a day by a total of twenty-three full-time professional firefighters and fire officers. The department also has five volunteer firefighters.

Rye Fire operates out of two fire stations. Station One, which also serves as Fire Headquarters, is in the village area in the northern part of the city. Station Two, otherwise known as the Milton Point Firehouse, is in the southeastern part of the city near Milton Harbor.

=== Emergency medical services ===
Emergency medical service is provided by Port Chester-Rye-Rye Brook EMS at the Advanced Life Support Level (ALS). The agency has 30 paid EMTs, 15 paramedics and five volunteers. They operate up to five ALS ambulances and three paramedic flycars from their station in Port Chester and responds to over 5,000 calls a year between Port Chester, Rye and Rye Brook.

== Notable people ==
- Roz Abrams, former WABC-TV and WCBS-TV news anchors
- Christopher Atkins, actor
- Raymond E. Baldwin, US Senator
- Lex Barker, actor
- Jason Bateman, actor
- Justine Bateman, actress
- James Roosevelt Bayley, Catholic bishop
- John Bello, founder SoBe Beverages; former president NFL Properties
- Greg Berlanti, TV writer
- Junius Bird, archaeologist
- Roland T. Bird, paleontologist
- Alex Blum, cartoonist
- Roy J. Bostock, former chairman of Yahoo!
- James Bradley, author
- Ralph Branca, Major League Baseball pitcher
- Daniel Burke, former president of The American Broadcasting Company
- Barbara Bush, First Lady, attended Milton Elementary School
- Caleb H. Carlton, US Army brigadier general, retired in Rye
- Doja Cat, rapper and singer partly raised in Rye by her grandmother
- Nelson Chai, former CFO of Merrill Lynch and Bank of America
- Eamonn Coghlan, Olympic track and field athlete
- Bud Cort, actor
- Buster Crabbe, actor and Olympic swimmer
- John Daly, radio and television newsman, emcee What's My Line?
- Mike D'Antoni, head coach of the NBA's Houston Rockets
- William Davis, golfer
- Jennifer Donnelly, author
- Eddie Eagan, sportsman
- Amelia Earhart, aviator; first woman to fly solo across the Atlantic Ocean (born in Atchison, Kansas)
- Flea, bassist for the Red Hot Chili Peppers.
- Betty Francis, fictional character
- Mario Gabelli, stock investor, investment advisor, and financial analyst
- David Gottesman, businessman and billionaire
- Michael Grabner, professional hockey player
- Molly Guion, artist
- Sean Haggerty (born 1976), ice hockey player
- Mark Halstead, footballer
- Irving Harper, industrial designer
- Justin Henry, actor
- Thomas B. Hess, art writer and curator
- Alan J. Hoffman, famous mathematician
- Harold Holzer, Lincoln scholar
- Iakovos, Archbishop of America, (1911–2005)
- Marc Jacobs, fashion designer
- Ajit Jain, head of several reinsurance businesses for Berkshire Hathaway
- Elizabeth Janeway, author
- John Jay, Founding Father, negotiator of the Treaty of Paris, first Chief Justice of the United States, two-time Governor of New York State, anti-slavery advocate, and diplomat
- Peter Augustus Jay (lawyer), President of the NY Manumission Society
- John Clarkson Jay, physician and notable conchologist
- Mary Rutherfurd Jay, landscape architect
- Pierre Jay, first chairman of the Federal Reserve Bank of New York
- Arthur Judson, artists' and orchestra manager
- Christopher Kimball, chef, publisher of Cook's Illustrated and Cook's Country, co-founder of "America's Test Kitchen", and founder of Christopher Kimball's Milk Street Kitchen.
- Ralph Kiner, professional baseball player and broadcaster
- Robert A. Kindler, vice chairman of Morgan Stanley
- George Kirby, professional baseball player
- Nick Kroll, actor, comedian
- George Latimer (New York politician), politician, U.S. representative, former Westchester County Executive
- David Lee, physicist
- Brendan McCole, Gaelic footballer
- John Mack, Morgan Stanley CEO
- Wellington Mara, owner of NFL New York Giants
- William Moulton Marston, creator of Wonder Woman
- Eugene R. McGrath, former chairman and CEO of Consolidated Edison
- Allegra Mertz, championship sailor
- Charles E. F. Millard, president of PBGC
- Diana Millay, actress
- Jay Pierrepont Moffat, US Ambassador
- John Motley Morehead III, mayor of Rye, chemist, philanthropist
- Benjamin Morrell, explorer
- Mark Mulvoy, sports journalist and Sports Illustrated managing editor
- Ogden Nash, poet
- Eric Nisenson, author
- Caroline Love Goodwin O'Day, US congresswoman
- Nicholas Patrick, astronaut, Mission Specialist 1 on 2006 Discovery STS-116 mission
- George P. Putnam, author
- Steven C. Rattner, owner of Hard Rock Casino in Las Vegas
- Edith Gwynne Read, conservationist
- Joy Reidenberg, television star of nature documentaries on PBS, NatGeo Wild, Discovery
- Blanche Ring, Broadway actress and singer
- Zelia Peet Ruebhausen, policy advisor, UN observer
- James Sands, professional soccer player for NYCFC and USMNT
- Will Sands, professional soccer player for Columbus Crew
- Tatiana Saunders, soccer player in Iceland, France and England
- Liz Sheridan, actress
- Debora Shuger, author
- Adam Silver, commissioner of NBA
- Bill Stern, actor and sportscaster
- Stuart Sternberg (born 1959), owner of the Tampa Bay Rays
- B. J. Surhoff, Major League Baseball player
- John Thain, former Merrill Lynch CEO
- Fred Troller, Swiss-American graphic designer
- Edgar Wachenheim III, investor and author
- Diana Williams, WABC-TV news anchor
- Kimberly Williams, actress
- Bob Woodruff, ABC television journalist
- Sean Young, actress

== In popular culture ==
- Don McLean, raised in nearby New Rochelle, mentions Rye in the song American Pie: "good old boys were drinkin' whiskey in Rye".
