= Blind Brook watershed =

Watershed in New York, United States

Coordinates: 40°57′5.35″N 73°41′44.47″W

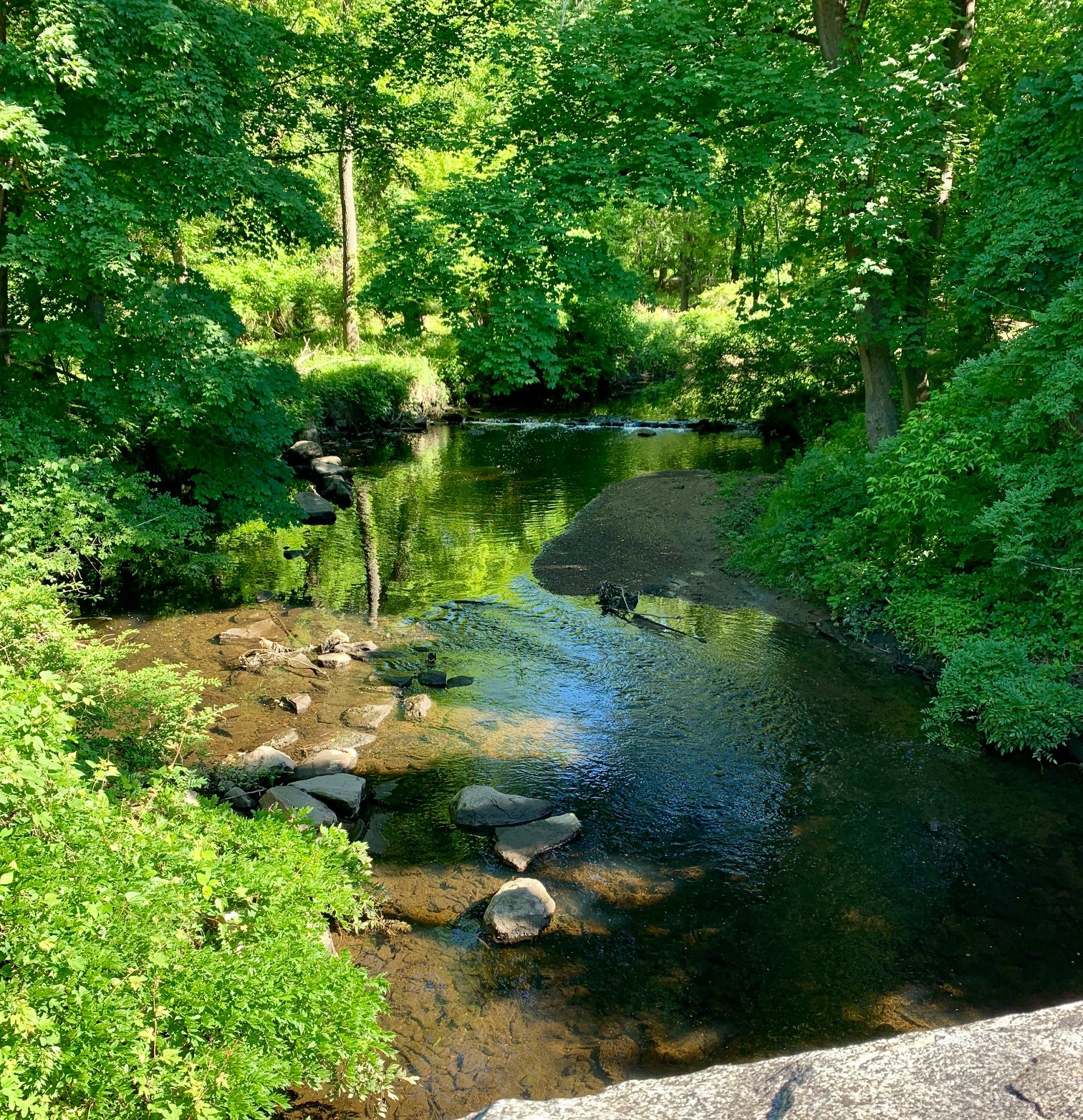
Blind Brook watershed, Rye, New York

The Blind Brook watershed is a significant, natural drainage basin and environmental resource located in Westchester County, New York. It occupies approximately 10.91 square miles or 6,980 acres falling largely within the Town of Rye. It spans the borders of New York and Connecticut.

== Geography ==
It is estimated that 96.7 percent of the Blind Brook watershed is in Westchester, New York and the remaining 3.3 percent is in Fairfield County, Connecticut. The headwaters of the Blind Brook estuary begin in West Harrison, New York. The watershed terminates at the City of Rye, draining into Milton Harbor.

== Flooding ==
The area has historically been known for acute flooding. This phenomenon affects Harrison, Rye, Rye Town and Port Chester. In 1968, environmentalist Edith Gwynne Read called attention to the need for impacted communities to collaborate on proactive solutions to study the already saturated watershed. While naturally occurring but heavy rainfalls trigger flooding, increased construction and creation of impervious surfaces during the 20th century are among the human impacts contributing to this phenomenon. In 1980, Rye residents and politicians called out the deleterious effects of the creation of massive office parks; corporate campuses that were blamed for increasing flooding downstream included SUNY Purchase, General Foods and Texaco.

Following the Nor'easter of 2007, another study was prepared in 2008 by the US Army Corps of Engineers. That study claimed that the most catastrophic flooding in Rye had occurred in 1972 following Hurricane Agnes.

=== Westchester County Airport impacts ===
Westchester County Airport was constructed in 1942, by the Air National Guard with a goal of protecting the Rye Lake Reservoir from war time sabotage and safeguarding New York's drinking water supply. However the runoff ultimately was diverted to the Blind Brook watershed.

In 2011, plans to expand Westchester County Airport produced more scrutiny of the potentially adverse environmental impacts of development. An RFQ was issued with the stated goals of obtaining a "wetland delineation survey of the entire airport property" as well as re-validation of "previously mapped wetland boundaries" and areas of change.

== Archaeology ==
Portions of the watershed are of great archaeological significance. The presence of Native Americans has been established many times through the discovery of relics and burial sites in the Blind Brook area in 1855 and 1867.

In 1972, a construction vehicle preparing the site for building a new house unearthed skeletal remains. Archaeologists were brought in to further examine the burial site. Over 50 pottery sherds were found and assessed to be from the Clason's Point phase. The area is just a mile from another archaeologically significant site, Marshlands Conservancy.

== Wildlife ==
The Blind Brook watershed has been recognized as an important area for flora and fauna. Portions that had eroded have been restored by Westchester County's Planning Department improving water quality and enhancing habitat for wildlife.

== Controversy ==
Allegations that the waterway has been polluted by the City of Rye were made in 2015, by the non-profit organization Save the Sound. The group claims the municipality violated the EPA Clean Water Act.

Expansion of the airport has raised concerns over adverse environmental impacts on the Blind Brook watershed and water quality. A community advocacy group called the Citizens for a Responsible County Airport count the Sierra Club Lower Hudson and Federated Conservationists of Westchester as supporters; they have raised safety concerns about the stormwater runoff. They are especially alarmed about PFASs discovered in groundwater tests between the Airport and the Kensico watershed.

== Cyber attack ==
Remote access to the Bowman Dam which helps control flooding of the Blind Brook watershed was compromised in 2013 by an Iranian hacker.
