= Tornado (Coney Island) =

Former roller coaster at Coney Island, Brooklyn, New York

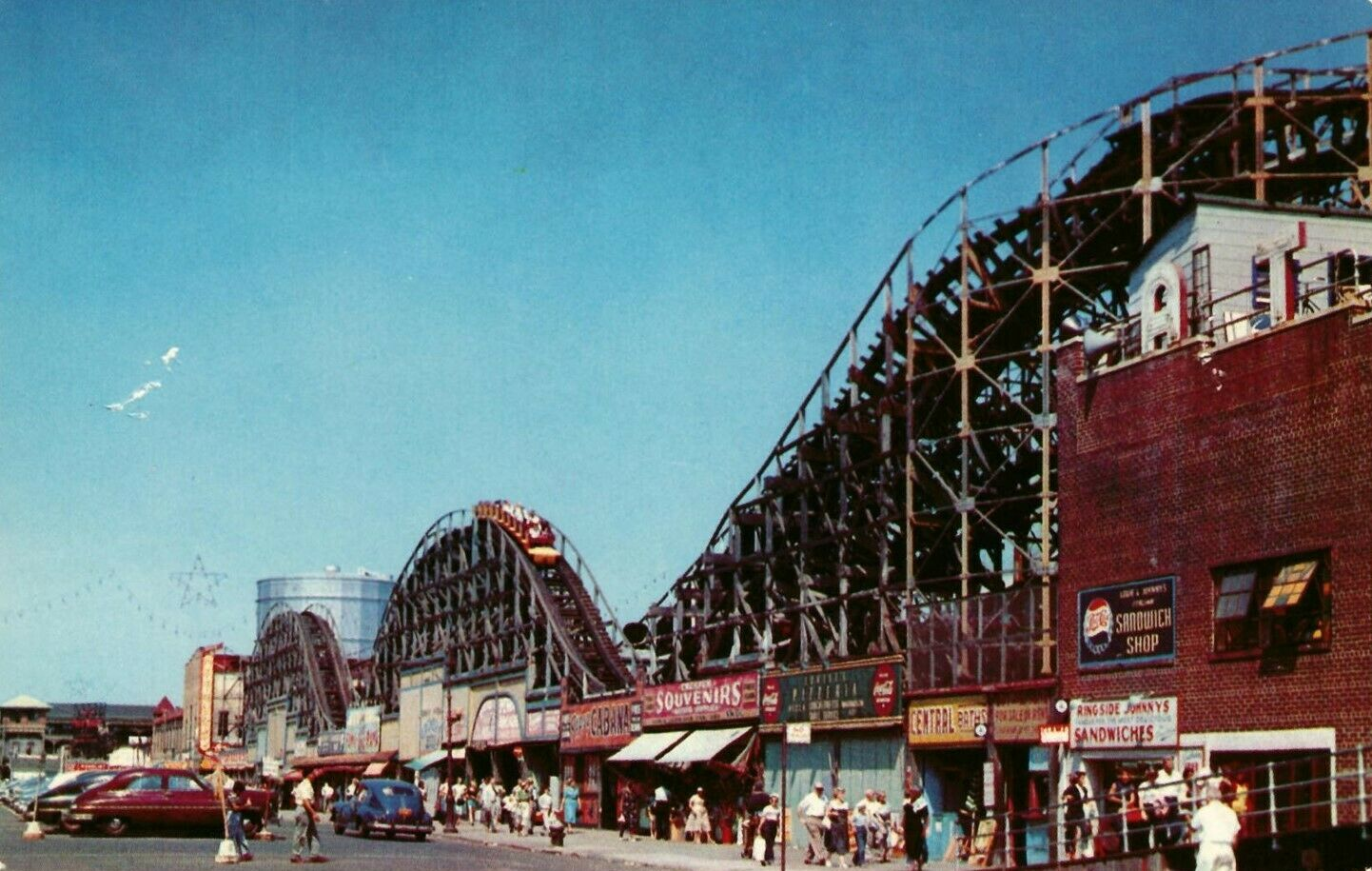
- Tornado in the 1950s

Coney Island
- Location: Coney Island
- Coordinates: 40.574°N 73.979°W
- Status: Removed
- Opening date: 1926
- Closing date: 1977
- Cost: $250,000

General statistics
- Type: Wood
- Track layout: Twister
- Height: 71 ft (22 m)
- Length: 2,970 ft (910 m)
- Inversions: 0
- Builders: Frank Darling; Frank Prior; Fred Church; LaMarcus A. Thompson
- Tornado at RCDB

Tornado (formerly known as Bobs) was a roller coaster located at Coney Island along Bowery Street in Brooklyn, New York City. Designed by Fred Church and built by the L. A. Thompson Company, the roller coaster cost $250,000 to build and opened in 1926. Much like the neighboring Coney Island Cyclone, it was a hybrid design consisting of a wooden track and steel structure. The coaster's track wrapped around a tower atop which the ride's name was attached. The land under the coaster was narrow, only 70 feet wide at its widest.

In 1977, much of the coaster was destroyed by arson. The coaster was completely demolished in April 1978.

== See also ==
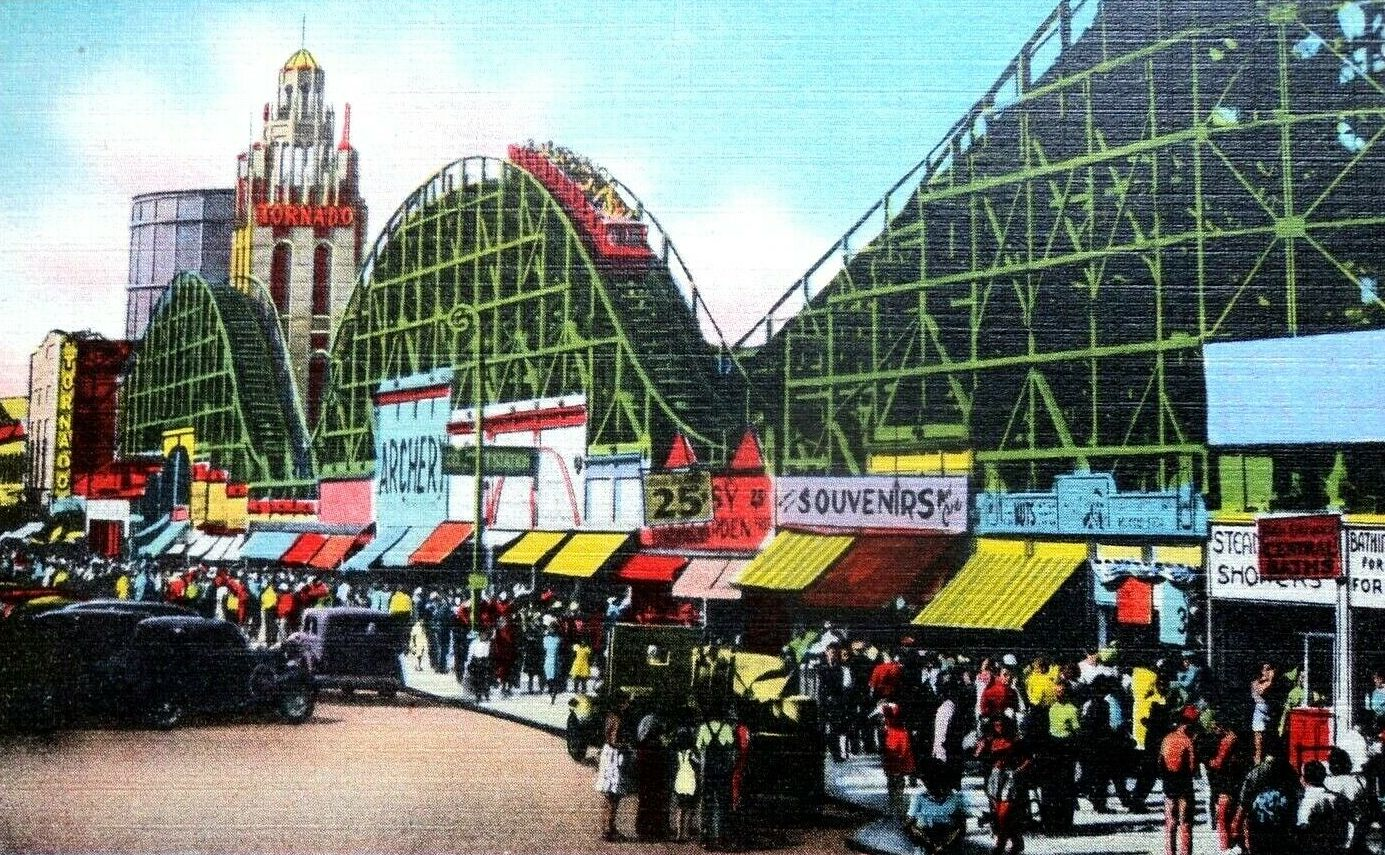
Illustrated postcard depicting Tornado in the 1940s

- Thunderbolt (1925 roller coaster)
