= Playland (New York) =

Amusement park in Rye, New York

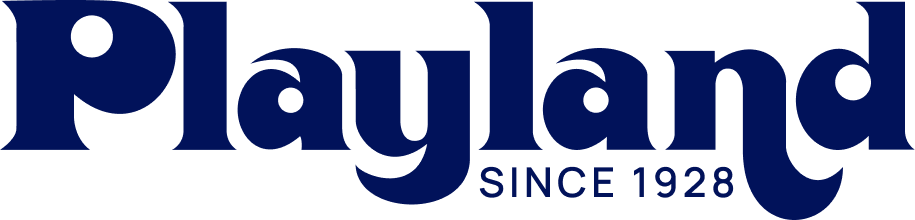
- Playland Logo
- Interactive map of Playland
- Location: Rye, New York, U.S.
- Opened: 1928
- Owner: Westchester County Government
- Slogan: "Have some fun today!"
- Area: 280 acres (113.3 ha)

- Playland Amusement Park
- U.S. National Register of Historic Places
- U.S. National Historic Landmark District
- New York State Register of Historic Places
- The park's old logo
- Coordinates: 40°57′57″N 73°40′26″W
- Architect: Walker & Gillette
- Engineer: Frank W. Darling
- Architectural style: Turn-of-the-20th century revival, Art Deco
- NRHP reference No.: 80004529
- NYSRHP No.: 11915.000039

Significant dates
- Added to NRHP: July 4, 1980
- Designated NHLD: February 27, 1987
- Designated NYSRHP: June 23, 1980

Playland (often called Rye Playland and also known as Playland Amusement Park) is an amusement park located along the Long Island Sound in Rye, New York, United States. Built in 1928, the 280-acre (110 ha) park is owned by the Westchester County government.

== History ==
=== Origin ===
The land upon which Playland was built was originally stewarded by Indigenous peoples who were attracted to the location by its waterfront along the Long Island Sound. Historic sources cite early campgrounds and a "burying hill." The association with Native Americans was so well known that it was used in original promotions for the venue and the county connected the naming of the park to its association with "prehistoric red men" who also used it as a playground. In 1928 and again in 1929, the Westchester County Parks Commission hosted and advertised a pageant depicting "Indian life in the county before the coming of the white man." The extravaganzas acknowledged that the amusement park was built upon land that was once the home and hunting ground of the Siwanoy tribe, a division of the Mohegan nation.

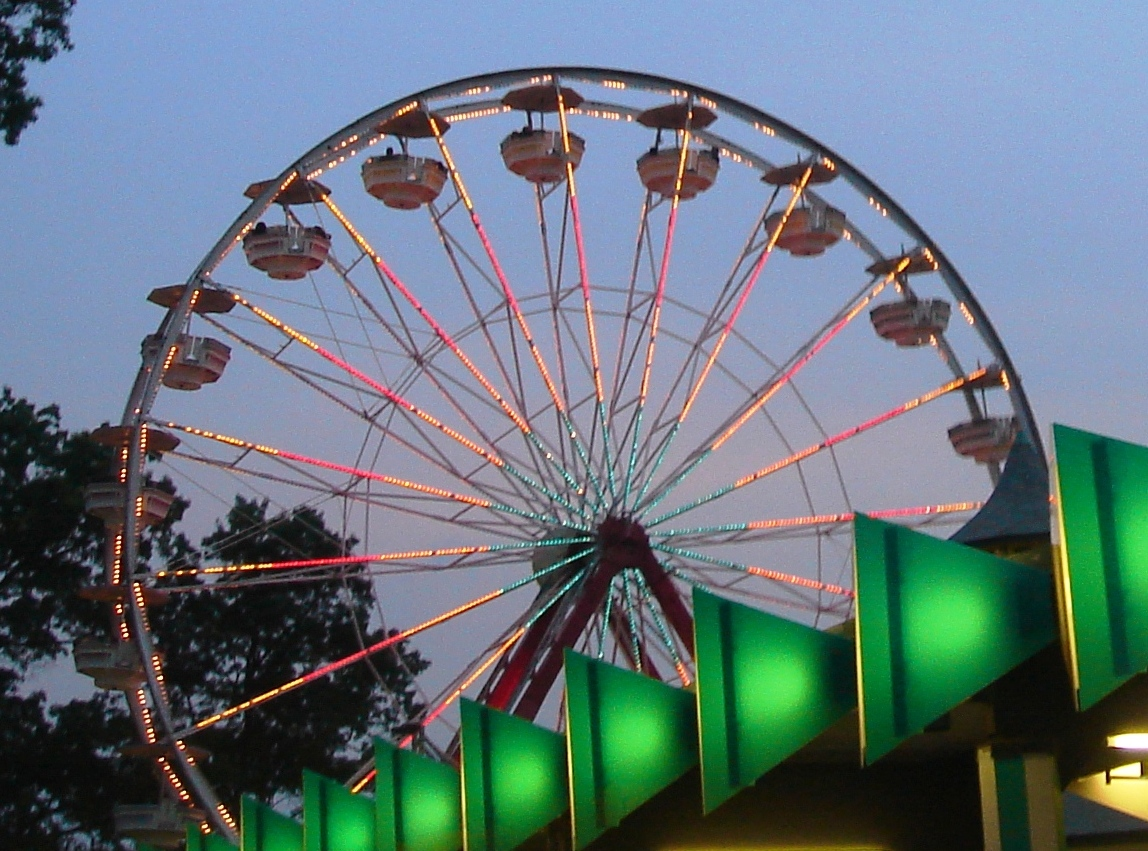
Ferris wheel at Playland

In the late 19th and early 20th centuries, that same waterfront area in Westchester County attracted a growing collection of recreational developments, including hotels, resorts, and "amusement areas". Local residents concerned about "unsavory crowds" petitioned the Westchester County Park Association to purchase two existing theme parks, Rye Beach Pleasure Park and Paradise Park, and replace them with a local-government-sponsored amusement park.

The well-known NYC architectural firm Walker & Gillette and landscape architect Gilmore David Clarke were commissioned to produce a comprehensive design of both buildings and grounds, making Playland the first planned amusement park in the country. Frank W. Darling, a veteran amusement park builder with experience at Coney Island and the British Empire Exhibition at Wembley, was secured first to lead construction of the park and then hired to run it.

Construction commenced in September 1927, and was completed in six months. The two previous amusement parks at Rye Beach and "a haphazard collection of flimsy structures, were operated or rented by the Park Commission while a policy and plans for the development of Playland were being formulated. The wrecking of these old buildings began on the morning after Labor Day, 1927, and the resulting debris was piled up and burned."

The park began operation on May 26, 1928. Rides that were operating on Playland's opening day included the Grand Carousel, Derby Racers, The "Original" Whip (there is a historic sign referencing its 1928 creation) and the Dragon Coaster. The Airplane Coaster was added in 1928 while the Casino opened in 1929.

=== Reception from Rye residents and officials ===
The relationship between the amusement park and the village of Rye soured almost immediately, as residents of Rye became concerned about the increased volume of traffic from outside Rye that was created, particularly those arriving in buses. On July 4, 1929, it was estimated that over 150,000 people came to Playland and the new director of Playland charged the Rye Police with unnecessarily pestering and detaining drivers. The then Mayor of Rye, John Motley Morehead defended Rye's legal authority to enforce its ordinances and wrote an open response to the county characterizing the relationship between Playland and the Village of Rye as "quite strained on account of the noise nuisances occasioned by the park."

By 1933, disgruntled Rye officials began conferring together and planning to solicit advice from legal representatives about making the county-owned park taxable.

About the same time, the activities of Playland's director, Frank Darling were scrutinized by others who claimed the county had excluded local contractors from competitive bidding. Following allegations of mismanagement and negative publicity, Darling resigned from Playland in 1933.

=== Mid 20th century ===
Playland continued to operate after the US entered World War II. In 1942, it was the county's largest moneymaker bringing in $700,000 during the summer. Rides and amusements operated after dark but adaptations included dimming the park's lights at night with some turned off altogether. For example, the Music Tower was left completely dark. Lights on the Long Island Sound side were similarly extinguished per orders of the War Department.

=== Late 20th century ===
In 1966, a major fire at the amusement park claimed some of Rye Playland's all-time classic attractions, including the original Bumper Car ride, the "Magic Carpet" and the Fun House. It was estimated that 15% of the park was destroyed.

The Marriott Corporation managed the park in 1981 and 1982 as part of a two-year experimental period. During those two seasons, the park was run at a loss in excess of $5 million. Westchester County took operation back over in 1983.

Playland was declared a National Historic Landmark in 1987. At the time, it was the United States' only Art Deco amusement park.

A storm in 1992 submerged the park in four feet of water and damaged the boardwalk and pier. Similar damage occurred again in 1996.

=== 21st century ===
Playland Park amusement park, 2019

By 2001, Playland was Westchester's most visited park, seeing one million visitors that year. For the 2002 season, Playland unveiled three new rides: the Kite Flyer, Crazy Mouse, and Sky Skater. Until the beginning of the 2002–2003 National Hockey League season, the New York Rangers practiced at the Playland Ice Casino. As of 2023, the Manhattanville College hockey team, located in nearby Purchase, was playing its home games at Playland.

In 2012, Hurricane Sandy claimed parts of Playland's boardwalk, flooded and caused substantial damage to the Ice Casino, and scattered debris throughout Read Sanctuary. As a result of damage sustained during the hurricane, the north boardwalk remained closed until 2018.

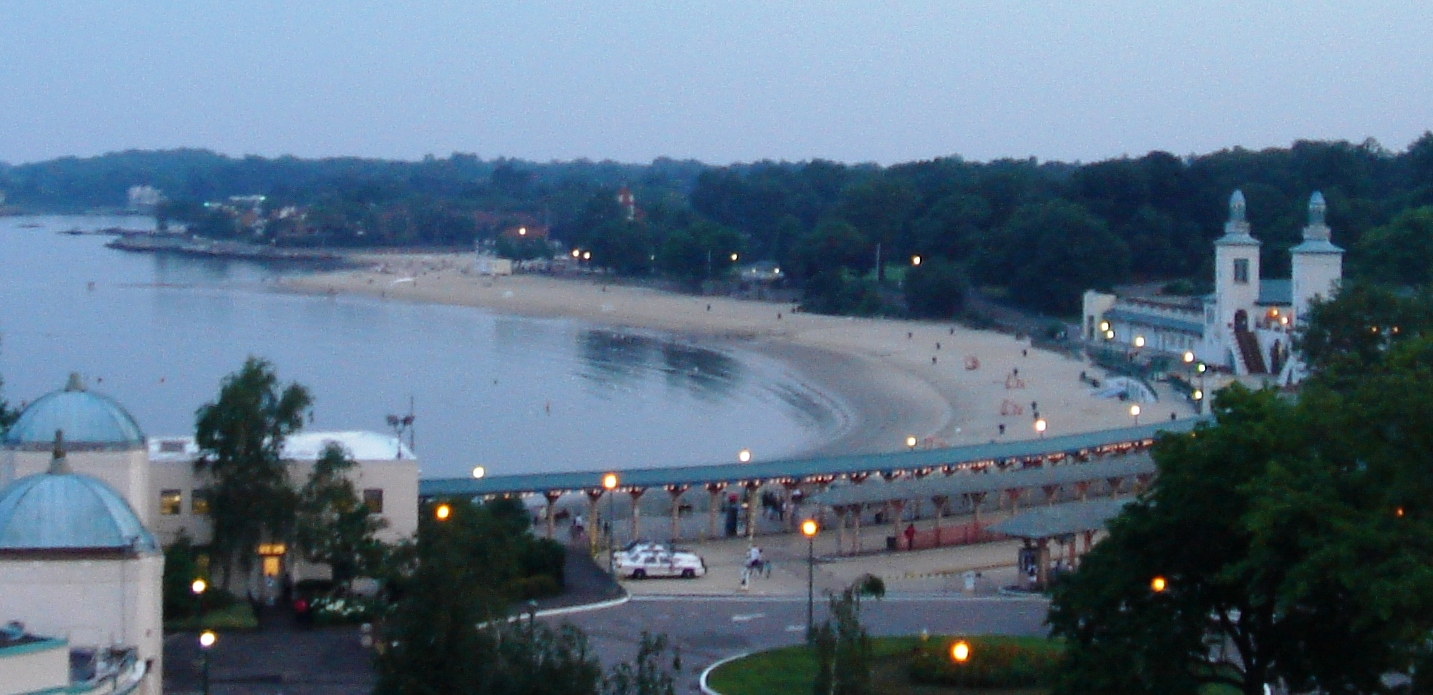
Playland Beach

In May 2016, the Westchester County Board of Legislators voted 13–4 to give control of the park to a management company called Standard Amusements. Standard Amusements agreed to invest $27.5 million in the park, which it would manage for 30 years. Westchester County would maintain ownership of the park, and receive an annual base rent and 8% of the park's profits after Standard Amusements recouped its initial investment. In 2019, Playland unveiled its first ride since 2008, a Disk'O half-pipe made by Zamperla.

In May 2019, Standard Amusements filed for Chapter 11 bankruptcy protection in an effort to repair a management deal that Westchester County politicians went against. Playland did not operate during the 2020 season due to the COVID-19 pandemic.

Standard Amusements leased the park for three years starting in 2022. Playland began its $125 million 5-year revitalization project the same year. The project saw the rebuild of the Derby Racer canopy, new and updated bathrooms across the park, new and updated midway games, as well as 3 new rides: Old Rye Motorbike Factory, Catch N' Air, and the Tornado.

The county resumed management of Playland in 2025 and the park was open for the summer but many of its rides were not operational.

== Attractions ==
Walker & Gillette's asymmetrical beaux arts plan integrated Playland's three major components. The first component, a swimming park, is defined by a semi-elliptical beach, boardwalk, and arcade. At the center of this arcade, a Spanish Revival bathhouse and pool terminates the automobile approach along Playland Parkway and its twin towers frame a view of Long Island Sound. The second component, an amusement park, is laid out along an axial landscaped mall at roughly 90 degrees to the Parkway approach. An entrance plaza with central fountain at the beach end of this axis is defined by corner pavilions and anchored by a casino and ice rink building. The axial mall is flanked by colonnades which serve to visually organize the various rides, games, and restaurants on each outboard side. A midway cross-axis terminates in a gate at the large parking lot on its inland end and at a promontory at its waterside end. The main axis terminates in a 100 foot tall Music Tower that now has a performance stage at its base. All original amusement park buildings are in an Art Deco style. The third component, a boating lake, lies beyond the tower. Its boathouse consists of two pavilions symmetrically flanking a central colonnade, facing a terrace and boat dock and the lake.

Many of the original 1928 building facades and details were completely removed or "gutted to the studs" in 2022 as part of a $135,000,000 refreshment. Money was invested in recreating details in different materials.

=== Fireworks ===
From the first year it opened in 1928, Playland has attracted giant crowds for its fireworks. Pyrotechnic displays have become a notable attraction of the park increasing visitation especially on Fourth of July.

=== Swimming park ===
Playland's swimming park includes a beach, pool, boardwalk, bathhouses and arcade.

==== Pool ====
Playland's original pool opened on June 6, 1929. It was filled with fresh water. A 3-day carnival with divers and trapeze artists marked the occasion. The pool hosted the famous "Counties" swim meets for many years. The pool was demolished and rebuilt in 2021 and 2022.

=== Amusement park ===
Playland has many attractions but their rides are by far the feature that draws visitors. Admission to Playland is free for Westchester residents who wish to observe the rides. However, visitors must pay for a wristband that will give them all-day access to the rides. Non-Westchester residents must pay admission to get inside Playland and an additional fee for the wristband. Westchester residents generally also pay a lower price for the wristbands than non-Westchester residents. To keep the price of each ride low, Westchester County's government offers sponsorships to businesses in exchange for annual naming rights for a ride, in addition to sponsorships for concerts, fireworks, and revues.

Playland is home to the "Grand Carousel", a 1915 Mangels-Carmel carousel. It has four rows with 48 jumpers, 18 standers and three chariots. It was originally in New Haven, Connecticut, and moved to Playland when the park opened in 1927. The Grand Carousel has a rare band organ built by the Gavioli company in Italy. The organ enclosure features two male figures that strike bells in time to the music while the central female figure moves a baton. The Grand Carousel contains designs including those on the horses that are completely hand-carved and painted by Charles Carmel from Brooklyn, New York. The horses possess many unique traits that include elaborate "fish scale" blankets, inlaid gemstones, armor and lolling tongues on several.

Playland is also home to one of only three racing carousels still in existence. The Derby Racer was built in 1927 for Playland by Prior & Church with horses carved by Marcus Charles Illions, a turn of the century New York carousel horse carver. The Derby Racer rotates at 25 miles per hour (40 km/h) – three times the speed of a normal carousel. The horses move back and forth as well as up and down, simulating a true gallop as it races around the track. The other "Derby Racing Carousels" are located at Cedar Point, in Sandusky, Ohio; and Blackpool Pleasure Beach, in Blackpool, Lancashire, United Kingdom. Playland also features an upcharge Go Kart track.

==== Roller coasters ====
Name	Manufacturer	Type (Model)	Year opened	Stats	Description
Crazy Mouse	Zamperla	Steel (wild mouse)	2003		Traditional Wild Mouse roller coaster.
Dragon Coaster	Frederick Church	Wooden	1929	3400 feet of track – 80 feet high – Approx 45 mph	The Dragon Coaster serves as the park's mascot and appears in the Playland logo. Designed and built by amusement ride creator Frederick A. Church, it has a tunnel along its span. The tunnel resembles the body of a dragon, and the opening of the tunnel resembles a dragon's mouth. The dragon has eyes that light up, and it blows steam from its nostrils. Playland Park removed the classic Prior and Church trains in 1989 and replaced them with Morgan trains because the P.T.C.s did not have up-to-date safety technology such as lap bars and other items. The Dragon Coaster is classified as one of the park's seven "classic" rides.
Family Flyer	Zamperla	Steel (family gravity coaster)	2001	262 feet of track – 13 feet high	A short roller coaster with a helix and small drops.
Kiddy Coaster	Rudyard Stephen Uzzell	Wood	1928		An ACE Coaster Classic and ACE Coaster Landmark

==== Thrill rides ====
Name	Manufacturer	Year opened	Model	Description
Catch a Wave	Wisdom Rides	2006	Genesis	A row of seats that rotate clockwise and anticlockwise in a vertical circle by two arms.
Derby Racer	Prior and Church Company	1927	Derby Racer	One of only three rides of its kind still in existence. Built in 1927 for Playland by Prior & Church with horses carved by Marcus Charles Illions, a turn of the century New York carousel horse carver. The Derby Racer rotates at 25 miles per hour (40 km/h) – three times the speed of a normal carousel. The horses move back and forth as well as up and down, simulating a gallop as it races around the track. The ride & its canopy was refurbished for the 2022 season.
Double Shot	S&S Worldwide	2000	Double Shot	Drop tower type attraction that uses compressed air to rapidly propel riders up the tower then gently lower them with a series of air-cushioned bounces back to the loading platform.
Dragonator	Zamperla	2019	Disk'O	Small halfpipe with outwards-facing seats.
Log Flume	Hopkins	1994	Log Flume	Passengers sit in the logs, which are propelled along the flume by the flow of water, followed by a rapid descent
Playland Plunge	Hopkins	2001	Shoot the Chute	A flat-bottomed boat that slides down a ramp into a lagoon.
Playland Yo-Yo	Chance Rides	2008	Yo-Yo	A swing ride that tilts.
The Whip	W.F. Mangels & Company	1928	Whip	Two circular wheel-like turn-table platforms on opposing sides of a rectangular base. Motors turn a cable that leads a number of 2–3 person seater cars that are attached, around a platform made of steel plates. The ride follows the track while the cable turns. When the car reaches one of the turn-table platforms, the speed picks up forcing riders to one side as the car whips around the corner.

==== Dark rides ====
Name	Manufacturer	Year opened	Model	Description
Ye Old Mill	Prior and Church Company	1929	Boat Dark Ride	A classic Playland attraction in which guests ride a boat through a convoluted tunnel that runs underneath the Dragon Coaster. The riders are shown scenes of an underground "Water Works", where elves, trolls and dragons live. The ride was themed in the 1980s by Sally Corporation with primitive animatronics.
Zombie Castle	Traver Engineering Company	1934	Dark Ride	Originally known as A Laugh in the Dark. Similar to Ye Old Mill where passengers steer themselves through a canal with surprises along the way.

==== Family rides ====
Name	Manufacturer	Year opened	Model	Description
Bumper Cars	unknown	1978	Dodgems	A Bumper Car attraction where guests drive their own car and attempt to bump other cars out of the way.
Gondola Wheel	Chance Rides	1990	ferris wheel	A 90 foot tall ferris wheel that offers guests a view of the theme park.
Grand Carousel	W.F. Mangels	1928	carousel	A historical 1928 carousel, with classic organ music.
Kite Flyer	Zamperla	2002	Kite Flyer	Guests lay horizontally on colorful gliders as they fly through the air.
Music Express	Wisdom Rides	2008	Musik Express	
Old Rye Motorbike Factory	Technical Park	2022	Swingaround	
Tornado	Wisdom Rides	2022	Tornado	

==== Kiddyland ====
Kiddyland is a section with children's rides in the southwestern section of Playland. Its rides include:

- Antique Cars
- Boat Ride
- Convoy
- Crazy Submarine
- Flying Dragons
- Fun Slide
- Himalaya
- Jolly Caterpillar
- Jump n' Bean
- Jungle Jamin
- Kiddy Carousel
- Kiddy Scrambler
- Kiddy Whip – a smaller whip ride
- Motorcycle Jump
- Mushroom Ride
- Playland Express – a ridable miniature railway
- Red Baron
- Slime Bucket
- Sun and Moon
- Swing Around

==== Ice casino ====
Today's "Ice Casino", built in 1929, opened in 1930 with dual functions. It originally contained a main ice rink as well as a full dance floor on the second floor that functioned as a dance hall through the 1940s and '50s. It also had a full service fine-dining restaurant and an outdoor café. It had smaller dining rooms upstairs for upscale private dinners.

The casino was built atop an Indigenous burying ground.

It became a very popular place for ice hockey and ice skating competitions and shows. It was closed during World War II. It was also closed between 1967 and 1969 for improvements. A renovation in the 1970s added a kiddie rink as well as a mid-sized ice rink. A renovation to the main ice rink that included a new surface, boards and glass was completed in 2007 for the Empire State Games. The New York Rangers started using it as a practice rink in 1979 until 2002 when they moved to Tarrytown.

==== Music tower ====
When first conceived, the music tower at Playland was a novel concept in park music. As the source of sound for the entire park, its system configured by Western Electric replaced the typical hurdy gurdy organs with orchestral melodies that could be heard while in the pool or near the rides and concessions.

County Parks added a temporary music stage to the base of the tower for concerts and bands which then became permanent sometime after 2000.

The tower has undergone rehabilitation several times since it was first erected. Bids to rehabilitate the tower were published in 2008 and the construction was anticipated to be completed in time for the 2009 season. The architectural and engineering planning was contracted to Busing Associates which received a 2009 AIA Westchester/Mid Hudson Citation Award for their design.

A portion of the stucco and foam covered facade of the music tower refurbished in 2009 failed on March 17, 2026.

=== Former amusement park features ===
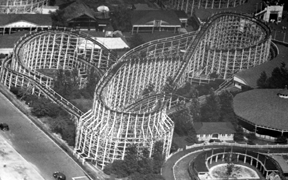
Airplane Coaster in 1928

==== Flat Rides ====
Ride	Manufacturer	Year opened	Year closed	Model	Description
SkyFlyer	ARM (UK)	1995	2021	Kamikaze	Sold to traveling carnival Modern Midways. Replaced by expanded restrooms & a dining establishment for the 2022 season.
Turtle Chase (formerly Tumblebug)	Traver Engineering	1929	1977		Six turtle-shaped cars raced around a "wavy, circular track". Retired after 8 people were injured. Metal fatigue cited.
Thunderbolt	Chance Rides	1989	2021	Matterhorn	Swinging cars which travel on an uneven circular path. Replaced by the Tornado for the 2022 season.
Starship 2000	Wisdom Rides	1995	2021	Gravitron	48 padded panels lining the inside wall. Riders lean against these panels, which are angled back. As the ride rotates, centrifugal force is exerted against the pads by the rider, removing the rider from the floor, due to the slant. Replaced by the "Old Rye Motorbike Factory", an expanded walkway & landscaped area for the 2022 season.
Wipeout	Chance Rides	1992	2021	Trabant	A flat ride where 60 riders sit while the ride spins & tilts as classic rock n' roll music plays. It was replaced by the "Old Rye Motorbike Factory" for the 2022 season.
Sky Skater	Interactive Rides	2002	2022	Sky Skater	An oversized skateboard as it teeters back and forth. Set to be replaced by a ride called "Jack The Puppeteer", although no information aside from a mention on the park map is given about this planned ride.
Go Karts	unknown	unknown	2022	Go-Karts	Classic Go-Kart attraction that is an authentic looking race cars. The cars come in single-seater or double-seater models. Contrary to most parks, the Go-Karts are included in admission with no additional fee.
Catch N' Air	Majestic Rides	2022	2024	Catch N' Air	A skateboard-themed attraction where guests ride in a circular motion up and down a bunny hill. Replaced by seating areas in 2024.

==== Dark Rides ====
Ride	Manufacturer	Year opened	Year closed	Model	Description
Flying Witch	Pinfari	1971	2021	Dark ride	A multi-story tracked dark ride through haunted house scenes with old-school props and scene displays. It was replaced by the Catch N' Air for the 2022 season, and subsequently relocated to Niagara Amusement Park & Splash World, where it reopened in 2025.

==== Roller coasters ====
Ride	Manufacturer	Model	Year opened	Year closed	Description
Airplane Coaster	Frederick Church	Wood	May 26, 1928	1957	In 1927, construction began on the Airplane Coaster, overseen by Frank W. Darling. It was originally thought that the Traver Engineering Company had been responsible for the construction of this ride; however, in 1983 the original blueprints, signed by Fred Church, were discovered in an attic at the park, disproving the Traver Company misconception. Known originally as "Airplane Dips", its name was changed to "Aero-coaster" and then finally to "Airplane Coaster". The ride was dismantled in 1957.
Flitzer	Zierer	Steel	1980		Thought to have only operated for one year.
Hurricane	S&MC	Steel	1995	2003	Relocated to Playcenter São Paulo (2005–2012) where it operated as Windstorm, then to Alpen Park (2013–present) where it operates as Alpen Blizzard
Monster Mouse	Allan Herschell Company	Steel	1967	1981	Relocated to Quassy Amusement Park where it operated as Mad Mouse from 1982 to 2010; currently not operational anywhere
Whirlwind	Vekoma	Steel	1984	1992	Relocated to Knoebels Amusement Resort (1993–2004) as Whirlwind, then to Parque de Diversiones (2005–present) as Bocaraca
Wild Cat	Schwarzkopf	Steel	1984	1991	Relocated multiple times. Previously at Busch Gardens Williamsburg as Die Wildkatze (1976–1983), then moved to Steel Pier (1994–1999), Williams Grove Amusement Park (2001–2004), and Adventure Park USA (2005–present) as Wildcat
Wild Mouse		Wood	1958	1965–1966	This ride was imported from Germany; according to Billboard's January 7, 1958, issue, it was sold to Playland by Eric Wedemeyer. Wild Mouse was then operated by concessionaire Schauer Amusement Corporation.
Wild Wind	Interpark	Steel	—N/a	—N/a	This roller coaster, built in late 1999, was never opened due to the G-forces being considered highly extreme, and was removed before 2000.
Zyklon		Steel	1971	1983	
Super Flight	Zamperla	Steel (Volare)	2004	2022	Currently standing inoperable at the park. Potentially reopening in 2025

=== Boating lake ===
The lake at Playland is manmade. Originally a marsh and home to mosquitoes, "dredges pumped the bottom out of half the swamp, thus making a deep lake of 80 acres.

== Controversy ==
Three Black individuals successfully sued the county over discrimination at Playland in 1935. The plaintiffs were represented by the NAACP. A white jury in the Rye court upheld their claim and found a Playland attendant ticket seller guilty of refusing the plaintiffs admission to the bathhouse and the beach.

In 1962, Representative Edwin Mooney called the awarding of contracts at Playland an ongoing political payoff to friends of the county administration.

The park began losing money again and in 1988, concerns about political impropriety resurfaced compounded by sexual wrongdoing at Playland causing headlines.

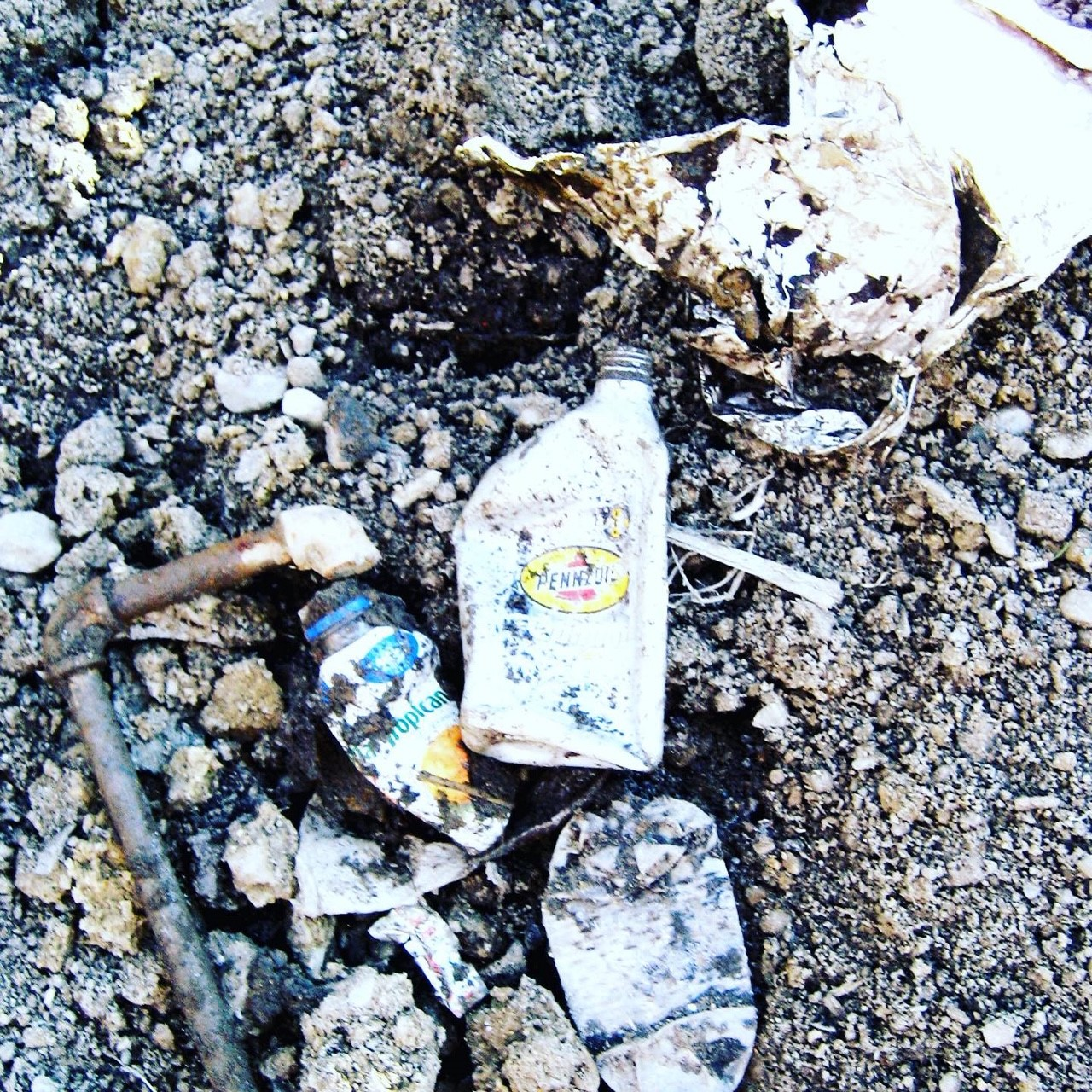
Contaminated fill from Playland

In 2010, Westchester County Parks was charged with 4 criminal violations by New York State Department of Conservation when they transported and dumped contaminated fill from Playland Amusement Park at the Jay Estate also in Rye. County Parks staff Joe Stout and Peter Tartaglia confirmed that the fill came from Playland and stated that the fill was "safe" and used in other parks. However, independent testing of the fill by the Jay Heritage Center revealed high levels of acetone and arsenic used in rat poison. The county was ordered to remediate the dumps but as of 2025 has not completed all the work.

Over the last fifteen years, the county has been beset by emergency situations related to Playland contracts. In 2022, despite contradictory opinions from two insurance companies, Zurich Insurance Company and Fidelity and Deposit Company, it terminated a contract with a company named Niram hired to do upgrades to the park. According to the Journal News, the county once more skipped over the standard bidding process receiving commentary from the New York Public Research Group that cautioned about lack of open competition. Blair Horner, executive director of the New York Public Interest Research Group said that if done properly, the bidding process "saves taxpayer dollars and reduces the possibility of corruption".

In January 2025, Standard Amusements sought to terminate its agreement to operate Playland, claiming that the county had not upheld an agreement to upgrade the park. As a result, the Westchester County government took over operations for the 2025 season. That May, the Westchester County government issued an emergency order, which allowed the government to directly hire Zamperla to fix and maintain the rides, rather than having to solicit bids for the rides' maintenance and upkeep. An arbitration panel ruled in July that Standard Amusements did not have the right to terminate its agreement with Westchester.

== Incidents ==
The Grotto

- On August 12, 1933, an 11-year-old girl was injured when she jumped out of a moving car after being frightened by a synthetic ghost. Her family sued and was awarded $6,000 in compensation including medical expenses. The trial was highly publicized and a witness for the county, Frederick Church, died of a heart attack while testifying about the ride he invented.

The Whip

- On August 18, 1938, a 19-year-old man was killed after being flung off The Whip.

Playland Lake

- On August 22, 1968, police searched for a 17-year old who rented a boat, disappeared and was presumed drowned.

Turtle Chase

- In 1977, eight people were injured on the Turtle Chase ride. The cause was determined to be metal fatigue of the ride itself.

Wild Mouse

- On July 8, 1984, six people were taken to the hospital after suffering injuries when one of the trains they were riding in collided into another. The ride was shut down for investigation and later reopened. Park officials stated that a mechanical failure was the cause of the accident.

Dragon Coaster

- On September 2, 1988, an 8-year-old girl choked to death while chewing gum on the ride.

Mind Scrambler

- On May 22, 2004, a 7-year-old girl from New Rochelle was killed when she fell out of the ride after she opened her restraining bar.

Ye Old Mill

- On August 3, 2005, a 7-year-old boy from Norwalk, Connecticut died of blunt force trauma to the head after he climbed out of a boat on the Ye Old Mill ride, where he became trapped underwater by a conveyor belt. The victim's family sued the county that owned Playland, and on March 24, 2009, the defendants were ordered to pay US$1.25 million, as well as create a scholarship in the victim's name. The scholarship will be awarded annually to Playland employees who exhibit excellence in safety and customer service.

Playland Lake

- On July 4, 2006, a 43-year-old woman from Queens drowned after walking into a man-made lake that is off-limits to swimmers. An autopsy showed the victim had a blood alcohol level seven times the legal limit.

Mind Scrambler

- On June 29, 2007, a 21-year-old female park employee from White Plains was killed when the ride was started by a second employee while the victim was still assisting guests with their safety restraints. Park officials stated that a safety precaution (put in place after the 2004 Mind Scrambler incident) was not followed. A report issued by the state's Labor Department on August 24, 2007, stated that the ride operators were running the ride improperly. The ride owner was cited for providing inadequate training. Due to this incident the Mind Scrambler was closed permanently.

Playland Lake

- In 2020, a 21-year-old man drowned in Playland Lake.

Music Express

- On July 28, 2023, the Music Express ride malfunctioned, leaving riders spinning backwards on the ride despite efforts to stop it until power was disconnected from the ride.

Playland Express

- On August 3, 2023, the last car of the Kiddyland Express fell off the track.

Playland Pool

- On August 1, 2024, a 5-year-old boy drowned in the Playland Pool after a medical episode.

Ye Old Mill

- On September 23, 2025, three men vandalized the park and caused over $38,000 worth of damage entering the Old Mill and other areas.

== In popular culture ==
Musician Ted Lewis and Rudy Vallée were among the first entertainers to perform for crowds at Playland.

The daytime soap opera Another World filmed some remote scenes there in 1986.

Glenn Close's and Ellen Latzen's characters ride the roller coaster in the 1980s thriller film, Fatal Attraction.

Playland was used for some scenes in the 1988 movie Big.

Mariah Carey filmed her video for the 1995 song "Fantasy" there. In it she is rollerblading at the park and riding the Dragon Coaster.

== Emergency services ==
The Westchester County Police provides law enforcement services throughout the year, but the park is only officer-patrolled on a 24-hour basis from April to October. In addition to County Police, the park employs seasonal park rangers. Uniformed park rangers work under the supervision of County Police officers. They assist park users, provide information on park rules and procedures, help in searches for lost children, and make regular security checks of buildings and facilities.

Westchester County Parks Emergency Medical Service provides basic life support services to the guests and employees of the park, and maintains the park's two first aid stations. Paramedic and ambulance transport services are provided through Port Chester-Rye-Rye Brook Emergency Medical Service. The Rye Fire Department handles all fire and rescue calls at Playland.

== See also ==
- List of National Historic Landmarks in New York
- National Register of Historic Places listings in southern Westchester County, New York
- Playland Parkway
- List of incidents at independent amusement parks
