= Frederick Church (engineer) =

American engineer and roller coaster designer

Frederick A. Church (1878–1936) was an American engineer and early roller coaster designer. He is most famous for his "Bobs" series of roller coasters that featured severe banking, steep drops, and nonstop action.

== History ==
Fred Church was often associated with Tom Prior and his business partners, after Tom's death, Frank Prior. Church had met Tom Prior in Chicago when Prior was publicity director at White City and Riverview Park, Chicago's two great amusement parks. Church was born in Ontario Canada, studied mechanical engineering at Tufts University, and landed a job at Webster Manufacturing and Engineering near Chicago. The company designed and fabricated replacement parts for amusement park rides. Church was working on side-friction roller coaster car designs and began developing an interest in inventing new rides.

Later coasters by Prior and Church would be built by Harry Traver, a legendary coaster builder and designer. Throughout the 1920s, Prior and Church coasters were built by Arthur Looff.

== Notable roller coasters ==
Three of Church's coasters are still operating. They are:

- Dragon Coaster, Playland Park, 1929
- Giant Dipper, Belmont Park, 1925
- Giant Dipper, Santa Cruz Beach Boardwalk, 1924

Additional Church coasters that are well-known, but no longer standing, include:

- Airplane Coaster, Playland Park, 1928–1957
- Bobs, Riverview Park, 1924–1967
- Cyclone Racer, The Pike, 1930–1968
- Thunderbolt, Savin Rock, 1925–1938
- Tornado, Coney Island, 1926–1977

The Big Dipper at Playland located in San Francisco (1922–1955) is sometimes mistakenly identified as a Prior and Church coaster. However, park owner Arthur Looff built the Big Dipper with his own crew. Looff made a deal with Prior and Church to use the ride as a showcase for other potential parks wanting the new double out and back style roller coaster in their park. He would land the role as coaster builder for at least three double out and back coasters from the Big Dipper's ride popularity. The most famous roller coaster in the world today, the Cyclone at Coney Island, is similar in design to the Big Dipper.

== Rolling stock ==
Church developed a rolling stock with flanged wheels for negotiating steep curves. Prior and Church coaster trains typically consisted of ten or eleven single-bench cars with open-air fronts, each bench securing up to three riders with a leather strap lap restraint.

== Racing Derby ==
Prior and Church are the creators of a carousel-type ride often called a Racing Derby.

== US Patents ==
Church registered the following patents:

- 895,427 Pleasure-Railway
- 895,428 Pleasure-Railway Cab
- 1,546,620 Safety Device For Coaster Cars
- 1,547,856 Coaster Coupling
- 1,741,286 Laminated Construction For Roller-Coaster Tracks

== Death ==
Frederick Church died of a heart attack while testifying in court on behalf of Westchester County in a lawsuit brought by a family whose child was injured at Playland.

== See also ==
Robert Cartmell (1987). "Chapter X. Traver, Prior and Church". The Incredible Scream Machine: A History of the Roller Coaster. Popular Press. pp. 153–166. ISBN 0-87972-342-4. http://www.westland.net/venicehistory/articles/church.htm
