= Frank W. Darling =

American amusement park builder

- Born: Michigan
- Died: Bradenton, Florida

Frank W. Darling (1872 – 1952) was a builder of many iconic amusement parks including an installation at the 1924 British Empire Exhibition in Wembley, the novelty complex "American Department Store" at Coney Island and Playland in Rye, New York.

== Early years ==
Darling and his brother, the American cartoonist Ding Darling, grew up in Michigan before moving to Iowa. Their father was a Greek professor at Albion College, and later a Congregational minister.

Sports were an important part of Frank Darling's school experience. While at Grinnell College, where he received Phi Betta Kappa distinction, he also played football and managed their baseball team.

== Career ==
While he started his professional career as a science teacher, and even considered medical school, he found himself employed by the L.A. Thompson Scenic Railway Company and under the mentorship of LaMarcus Adna Thompson. After Thompson's death in 1919, Darling would become president of this corporation and also become president of the National Association of Amusement Parks (NAAP) which was formed at about the same time. In 1926, the NAAP counted 1500 amusement park owners as members and represented 400 parks.

=== British Empire Exhibition ===
Darling's association with exhilarating amusement park rides earned him the nickname "Switchback King." In England, in 1924, at the British Empire Exhibition, he supervised the construction of what he himself called "the greatest pleasure park the world has ever seen." The thrilling park cost about £2,000,000 pounds. It included a scenic railway called the Great Racer which enthralled visitors with a mile-long gravity race on two parallel tracks over the span of just two-and-a-half exciting minutes. Another attraction he created featured a steep slope adventure called the Great Switchback which operated at speeds of 100 miles an hour.

=== Coney Island ===
Returning to projects in the U.S., in 1926, Darling introduced a sensational complex called the "American Department Store" which featured one-of-a-kind attractions like the "Tower of Jewels" "The Bob's Coaster" and "The Glass House."

=== Playland ===
With his entertainment credentials well established, in 1927, Darling was selected by the Westchester County Parks Commission to build "Playland" at Rye beach. Shortly thereafter, he became the amusement park's manager and director.

From the very beginning of his employment by the Westchester County Parks Commission, Darling's activities were scrutinized by others who claimed the County had excluded local contractors from competitive bidding. Following allegations of mismanagement and negative publicity, Darling resigned from Playland in 1933. From there he went on to build the famous Rainbow Room at Rockefeller Center.

=== Children's World ===
Darling was still sought after in the 1930s. He was tapped to design Children's World for the 1939 World's Fair held in New York. The undertaking was funded and directed by philanthropist Joan Payson. Darling planned a seven-acre entertainment complex among the many World's Fair pavilions and attractions with a projected cost of $1,000,000. The venue was created to appeal to 4 -14 year olds. The "little world's fair" within a larger world's fair was the culmination of the then 66-year old Darling's vision to build a juvenile entertainment and recreation center.

== Retirement and death ==
Darling retired to Gloucester, Virginia before moving to Bradenton, near Sarasota, Florida where he died in 1952.
