= Peter Augustus Jay (born 1821) =

American heir (1821–1855)

- Born: October 23, 1821; New York City, U.S.
- Died: October 31, 1855 (aged 34); New York City, U.S.
- Spouse: Josephine Pearson (m. 1848; death 1852)
- Children: Augustus Jay
- Parent(s): Peter Augustus Jay; Mary Rutherfurd Clarkson
- Relatives: John Jay (grandfather); Matthew Clarkson (grandfather); John Clarkson Jay (brother); Peter Augustus Jay (grandson)

Peter Augustus Jay (October 23, 1821 – October 31, 1855) was an American heir. He was a grandson of Founding Father John Jay.

== Early life ==
Jay was born in New York City on October 23, 1821. He was the second son among eight children born to Mary Rutherfurd (née Clarkson) Jay (1786–1838) and Peter Augustus Jay (1776–1843), the Recorder of New York City. His siblings included Dr. John Clarkson Jay, Mary Rutherfurd Jay (who married Frederick Prime); Sarah Jay (who married William Dawson); Catherine Helena Jay (who married Dr. Henry Augustus DuBois); Anna Maria Jay (who married Henry Evelyn Pierrepont); among others.

His paternal grandparents were Sarah Van Brugh (née Livingston) Jay and John Jay, the Founding Father who was a diplomat, the first Chief Justice of the United States and two-time Governor of New York State. His grandfather died in 1829 although his father legally received the Jay Estate in Rye in 1822 (which was later inherited by his elder brother John). His maternal grandparents were General Matthew Clarkson and Mary (née Rutherfurd) Clarkson, a sister of U.S. Senator John Rutherfurd and daughter of Walter Rutherfurd.

== Career ==
Jay was described by General John Watts de Peyster as "a perfect specimen of the typical French nobility, pure blood; handsome; well made; graceful; easy, agreeable, and as full of elegant wickedness as an egg of meat. Women, lovely women adored him and of every class; he was a charming fellow; not able but attractive."

According to his obituary, "To all Mr. Jay was a courteous gentleman; but only to those who knew him well and rejoiced in his friendship, were shown in their full strength the true and noble traits of his nature. There was no guile, and no taint of baseness in him. His honor was above the impeachment of even suspicion or malice. The truthfulness, sincerity, frankness, which so beautifully adorned his character, were themselves softened and mellowed by a chivalrous generosity."

== Personal life ==
On January 13, 1848, Jay was married to Josephine Pearson (1829–1852) of Washington, D.C. Together, they resided in Washington, and were the parents of one child before their early deaths:

- Augustus Jay (1850–1919), who in 1876 married Emily Astor Kane (1854–1932), a descendant of John Jacob Astor and the sister of DeLancey Astor Kane, S. Nicholson Kane, John Innes Kane, Sybil Kent Kane, and Woodbury Kane.

His wife died on January 3, 1852, at twenty-two years old, just under two weeks before their fourth wedding anniversary. After his wife's death, he committed to the sole care of his son. Jay died three years later on October 31, 1855, in New York City. He was buried in the John Jay Cemetery in Rye.
