= Peter Augustus Jay =

Peter Augustus Jay may refer to:

- Peter Augustus Jay (lawyer) (1776–1843), eldest son of Founding Father and first United States Chief Justice, John Jay
- Peter Augustus Jay (born 1821) (1821–1855), son of Peter Augustus Jay (1776–1843) and grandson of John Jay
- Peter Augustus Jay (diplomat) (1877–1933), American diplomat and great great grandson of Peter Augustus Jay (1776–1843)

== See also ==
- 1838 Peter Augustus Jay House, named for Peter Augustus Jay, a New York lawyer
- Peter Jay (disambiguation)
