= John Innes Kane =

American explorer, scientist, philanthropist

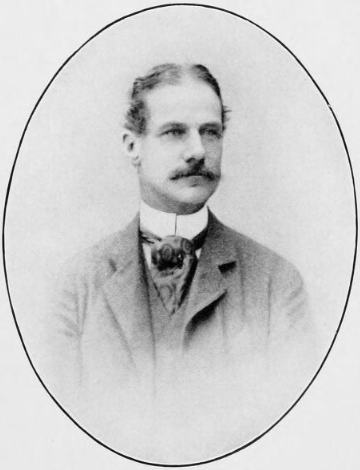
- Born: July 29, 1850
- Died: February 1, 1913 (aged 62); Manhattan, New York, U.S.
- Resting place: Green-Wood Cemetery
- Spouse: Annie Cottenet Schermerhorn (m. 1878)
- Relatives: Woodbury Kane (brother); S. Nicholson Kane (brother); Sybil Kent Kane (sister); DeLancey Astor Kane (brother)

John Innes Kane (July 29, 1850 – February 1, 1913) was an American explorer, scientist and philanthropist who was prominent in New York Society during the Gilded Age.

== Early life ==
Kane was born in 1850, one of eight children born to Oliver DeLancey Kane (1816–1874) and Louisa Dorothea (née Langdon) Kane (1821–1894). His siblings included Walter Langdon, DeLancey Astor Kane, Woodbury Kane, S. Nicholson Kane, Louisa Langdon Kane, Emily Astor Kane (who married Augustus Jay and was the mother of Peter Augustus Jay), and Sybil Kent Kane. The family lived at "Beach Cliffe", designed by Detlef Lienau, which was one of the earliest Newport cottages "to attain a sort of Beaux-Arts purity." (Note: "Beach Cliffe", built in 1852, was located on Bath Road at Rhode Island Avenue in Newport. It was torn down in 1939.)

Kane was a grandson of Walter Langdon and Dorothea (née Astor) Langdon and a great-grandson of John Jacob Astor. He was a cousin of Lt. Col. John Jacob Astor IV. His paternal lineage descended from John O'Kane who emigrated to the country in 1752 from County Londonderry and Antrim, Ireland. During the American Revolutionary War, O'Kane (who dropped the "'O" once in America) was living at Sharyvogne, his estate in Dutchess County, which was confiscated after the War due to his Loyalist ties. His eldest son, John Jr., stayed and became one of the most prominent merchants in New York.

== Interests and clubs ==
Kane inherited from his mother's family, so he never took an active part in business, "but had always taken a keen interest in scientific matters, in particular those dealing with discovery and exploration. He was also fond of art and travel." In 1912, the Kanes traveled to Egypt with J. Pierpont Morgan. Kane belonged to the Union Club, the Knickerbocker Club, the New York Yacht Club, the Metropolitan, the Whist Club, St. Elmo, the South Side Sportsmen's Club, and the Automobile Club of America.

The Kanes attended Alva Vanderbilt's famous March 1883 masquerade ball christening the Vanderbilt's new Petit Chateau on Fifth Avenue. In 1892, several members of Kane's family, but not Kane and his wife, were included in Ward McAllister's "Four Hundred", purported to be an index of New York's best families, published in The New York Times. Conveniently, 400 was the number of people that could fit into Mrs. Astor's ballroom (who was the first cousin of his father-in-law).

Kane sat on the Advisory Board of the Cooper Union museum during its first decade, up to near his death in 1913. His wife bequeathed a number of European decorative arts from the Renaissance through the eighteenth centuries to the museum.

== Personal life ==
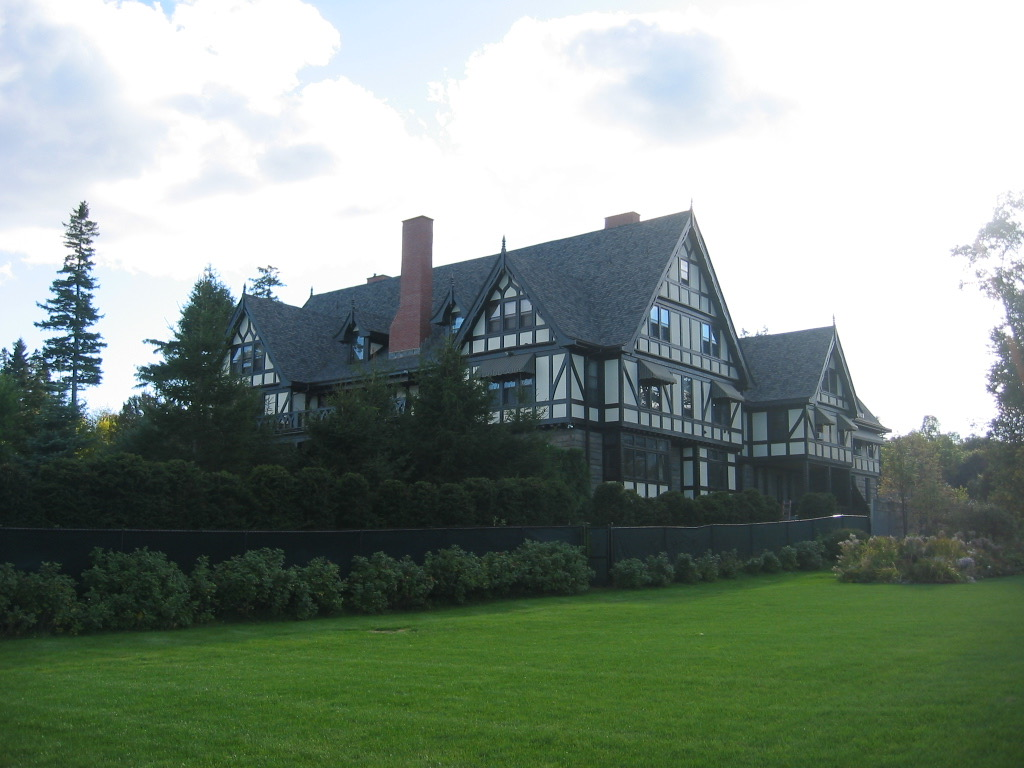
The John Innes Kane Cottage in Bar Harbor, Maine

On December 12, 1878, Kane was married to Annie Cottenet Schermerhorn (1857–1926), a daughter of William Colford Schermerhorn of 29 West 23rd Street. (Note: William Colford Schermerhorn, a first cousin of Caroline Schermerhorn Astor (the Mrs. Astor), was a grandson of Peter Schermerhorn and nephew of both James I. Jones and Abraham Schermerhorn.) Through her mother, she was a first cousin of Rawlins Lowndes Cottenet. At their wedding, Annie wore an ivory and gold satin gown with pearls by Charles Frederick Worth of the Parisian based House of Worth. (Note: Annie's wedding gown is today owned by the Museum of the City of New York.) The couple did not have any children.

Kane died of pneumonia on February 2, 1913, at his residence in New York City. He was buried in a memorial tomb, also designed by McKim, Mead & White, at Green-Wood Cemetery in Brooklyn. His widow died in July 1926, and left $4,000,00 to New York City charities, including $1,000,000 to the Home for Incurables and $1,000,000 to Columbia University (of which her father had been elected chairman of the Board of Trustees). For many years after her death, her estate continued contributing to various charitable causes in New York.

=== Residences ===
After years of renting houses in Lenox, Massachusetts, they acquired a summer estate on a bluff overlooking Frenchman Bay located at 45 Hancock Street in Bar Harbor, Maine. There, Kane had a Tudor Revival Cottage built between 1903 and 1904, designed by local architect Fred L. Savage, that was known both as Breakwater and Atlantique (although today it is known as the John Innes Kane Cottage). (Note: The John Innes Kane Cottage is one of a small number of estate houses to escape Bar Harbor's devastating 1947 fire.) The interior of the house, however, featured Colonial and Georgian Revival eighteenth-century styling. His widow left the home to Kane's nephew, U.S. diplomat Peter Augustus Jay and his wife, the former Susan Alexander McCook, who left it to her daughter, Susan Mary Alsop.

Kane hired the prominent New York architectural firm of McKim, Mead & White to design his New York City residence. His home, located at 1 West 49th Street (or 610 Fifth Avenue), "attracted immediate attention, when completed in 1909, because of its attractive simplicity. It was built in the style of the Italian Renaissance, and its furnishings were brought from all parts of Europe." The home was across the street from 608 Fifth Avenue, the home of Ogden Goelet and his wife, Mary Wilson Goelet. In August 1921, a fire in the library and dining room of the home destroyed family portraits and other heirlooms of the Kane and Schermerhorn families. Reportedly, fireproof construction planned by Stanford White saved the rest of the home from destruction.
