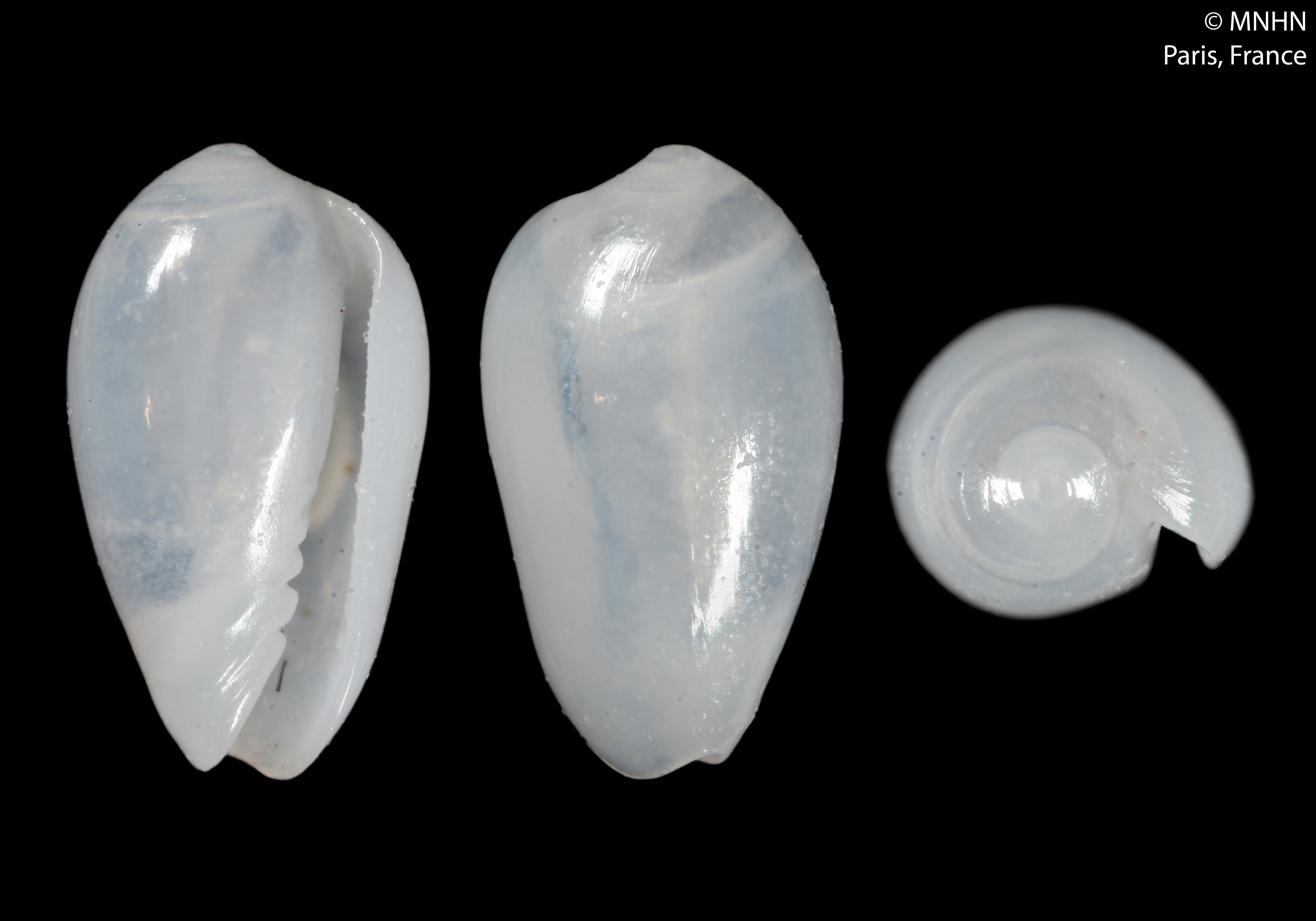
- Shell of Gibberula jayi (holotype at MNHN, Paris)

Scientific classification
- Kingdom: Animalia
- Phylum: Mollusca
- Class: Gastropoda
- Subclass: Caenogastropoda
- Order: Neogastropoda
- Family: Cystiscidae
- Subfamily: Cystiscinae
- Genus: Gibberula
- Species: G. jayi

Binomial name
- Gibberula jayi Boyer, 2014

= Gibberula jayi =

Species of gastropod

Gibberula jayi is a species of sea snail, a marine gastropod mollusk, in the family Cystiscidae.

== Etymology ==
G. jayi is named in honor of John Clarkson Jay the discoverer of the genus.

== Description ==
The shell is around 2.6-2.7 mm long and 1.7 mm wide. The species has swollen shells at the posterior with a uniformly subhayline shell.

== Distribution ==
G. jayi occurs in the middle reef zone of Réunion due to being at a depth of 10 to 20 meters. The species is also possibly in Mauritius and Rodrigues
