= Augustus Jay =

American diplomat (1850–1919)

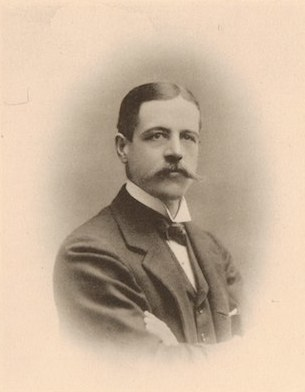
- Born: October 17, 1850; Washington, D.C.
- Died: December 25, 1919 (aged 69); New York City, New York, U.S.
- Education: Harvard College; Columbia Law School
- Spouse: Emily Astor Kane (m. 1876)
- Children: Peter Augustus Jay; DeLancey Kane Jay
- Parent(s): Peter Augustus Jay; Josephine Pearson Jay
- Relatives: Peter Augustus Jay (grandfather); John Clarkson Jay (uncle)
- Awards: Legion of Honour

Augustus Jay (October 17, 1850 – December 25, 1919) was an American diplomat and member of the prominent Jay family.

== Early life ==
Jay was born on October 17, 1850, in Washington, D.C. He was the only child of Peter Augustus Jay and Josephine (née Pearson) Jay (1829–1852). His mother died on January 3, 1852, at just twenty-two years old. After her death, his father committed to his sole care before his death three years later on October 31, 1855, in New York City. His paternal grandfather was Peter Augustus Jay, a member of the New York State Assembly and Recorder of New York City, and grandson of John Jay, Founding Father and first United States Chief Justice.

Jay graduated from Harvard College in 1871 and from Columbia Law School in 1876.

== Career ==
Although admitted to the New York bar, Jay never practiced law, instead he entered the diplomatic service. From 1885 to 1893, he was Secretary of the American Legation in Paris. On his retirement as Secretary of the American Legation in Paris, the French Government made him an officer of the Legion of Honor.

After they returned from France, they spent much time in Newport, Rhode Island, where Jay was one of the most prominent New York residents. In Newport, he was a stockholder of the Newport Reading Room and a member of the Newport Fishing Club. They owned Oakwold, located at 65 Old Beach Road, and designed in 1883 by architect Clarence Sumner Luce (designer of the Holyoke Opera House, Wistariahurst, and the James Henry Van Alen house).

== Personal life ==
On October 3, 1876, Jay was married to Emily Astor Kane (1854–1932), a daughter of DeLancey Kane and Louisa Dorothea (née Langdon) Kane. Emily, a descendant of John Jacob Astor, was the sister of DeLancey Astor Kane, Commodore S. Nicholson Kane, John Innes Kane, Sybil Kent Kane, and Rough Rider Woodbury Kane, all cousins of John Jacob Astor IV. Together, Augustus and Emily were the parents of:

- Peter Augustus Jay (1877–1933), also a diplomat who served as U.S. General Consul to Egypt, U.S. Minister to El Salvador and Romania and U.S. Ambassador to Argentina. He married Susan Alexander McCook, a daughter of Civil War officer and attorney John James McCook (and a granddaughter of Daniel McCook of the "Fighting McCooks").
- DeLancey Kane Jay (1881–1941), who married Elizabeth Sarah Morgan (1889–1975), a granddaughter of U.S. Senator and Governor Edwin D. Morgan, in 1910. (Note: The brother of Elizabeth Sarah Morgan (1889–1975) was Edwin D. Morgan Jr. (1890–1954), who married Elizabeth Winthrop (née Emmet) Morgan (1897–1934), a daughter of C. Temple Emmet and Alida Beekman (née Chanler) Emmet (also an Astor family descendant). Through Elizabeth Sarah Morgan's brother Edwin and his wife Elizabeth, she was an aunt to Edwin D. Morgan III, husband of Nancy Marie Whitney (a daughter of Cornelius Vanderbilt Whitney and Marie Norton Harriman).)

He was a member of the Knickerbocker Club, Union Club, and University Club of New York.

Jay died of heart disease on Christmas Day 1919, at his home, 960 Park Avenue in Manhattan. After a funeral at Trinity Church, he was buried in the John Jay Cemetery in Rye like his father before him. His widow left an estate valued at $450,000 upon her death.

=== Descendants ===
Through his eldest son Peter, he was a grandfather of Emily Kane Jay (1911–1926) and Susan Mary Alsop (1918–2004).

Through his second son DeLancey, he was a grandfather of six: Elizabeth Morgan (née Jay) Etnier Hollins (1911–1991), Peter Jay (1913–2000), Sybil Kane (née Jay) Waldron (1914–1997), Theodora Moran (née Jay) Stillman Rahv (1918–1968), Augusta (née Jay) Huffman (1921–2000), and Katharine Archer Morgan (née Jay) Bacon (1928–2013).
