= Sorich =

Sorich may refer to:

- Michael Sorich
- Bruno Sorich
- Sorich Park
