= John Clarkson Jay =

American physician and conchologist (1808-1891)

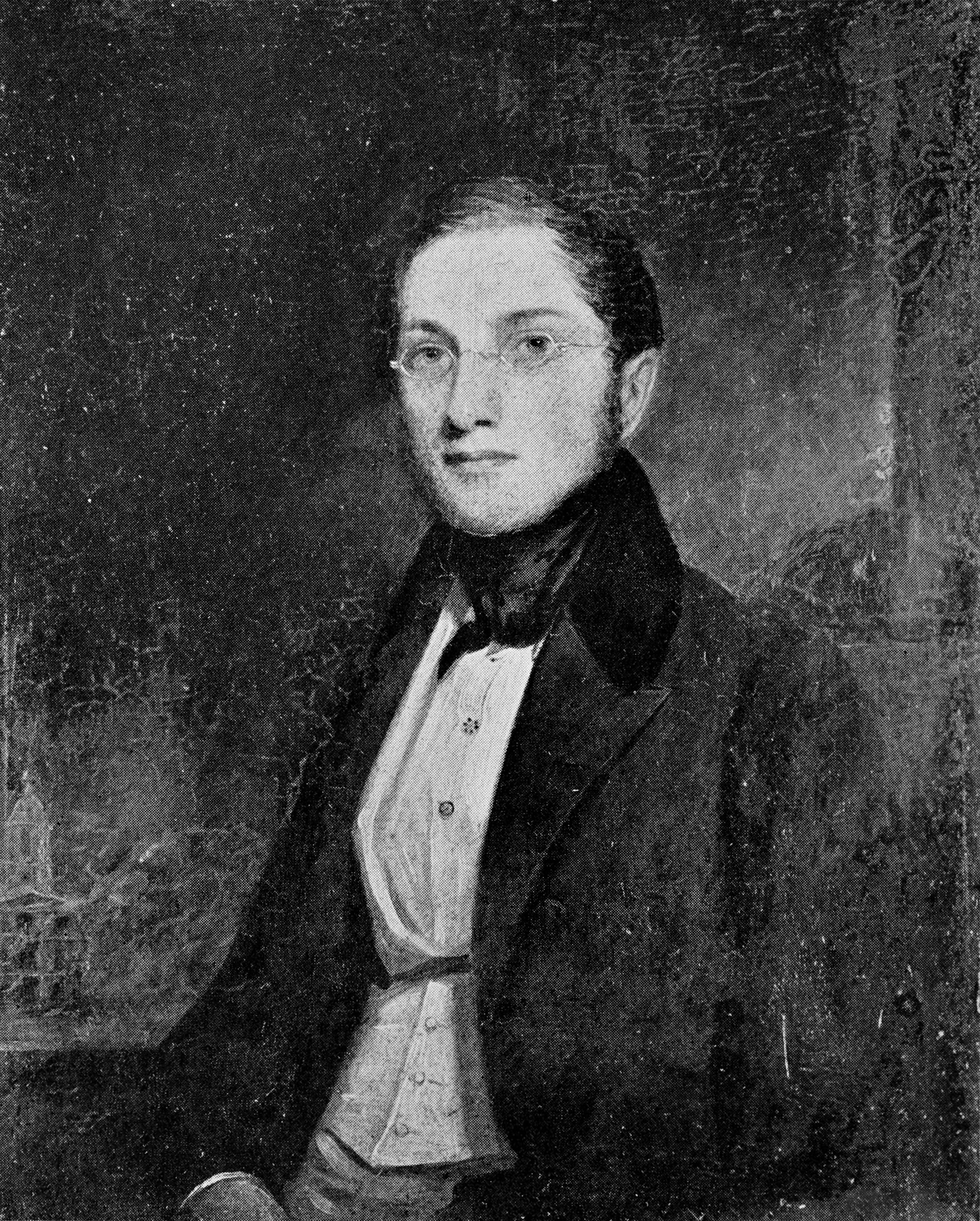
- Born: September 11, 1808; New York City, U.S.
- Died: November 15, 1891 (aged 83); Rye, New York, U.S.
- Education: Columbia University; College of Physicians and Surgeons
- Spouse: Laura Prime (m. 1831; died 1888)
- Children: 11
- Parent(s): Peter Augustus Jay; Mary Rutherfurd Clarkson
- Relatives: John Jay (grandfather); Matthew Clarkson (grandfather); Peter Augustus Jay (brother); Pierre Jay (grandson); Mary Rutherfurd Jay (granddaughter); Augustus Jay (nephew)

John Clarkson Jay (September 11, 1808 – November 15, 1891) was an American physician and notable conchologist as well as one of the original founders of the New York Yacht Club. He was the grandson of Founding Father John Jay.

== Early life and education ==
Jay was born on September 11, 1808, in New York City. He was the eldest of eight children born to attorney Peter Augustus Jay (1776–1843), the Recorder of New York City, and Mary Rutherfurd (née Clarkson) Jay (1786–1838). His siblings included Peter Augustus Jay, Mary Rutherfurd Jay, who married Frederick Prime; Sarah Jay, who married William Dawson; Catherine Helena Jay, who married Dr. Henry Augustus DuBois; Anna Maria Jay, who married Henry Evelyn Pierrepont; among others.

His paternal grandparents were Sarah Van Brugh (née Livingston) Jay and John Jay, the Founding Father who was a diplomat, the first Chief Justice of the United States and two-time Governor of New York State. His maternal grandparents were General Matthew Clarkson and Mary (née Rutherfurd) Clarkson, a sister of U.S. Senator John Rutherfurd and daughter of Walter Rutherfurd.

Jay graduated from his father and grandfather's alma mater Columbia in 1827, and from the College of Physicians and Surgeons in 1831.

== Career ==
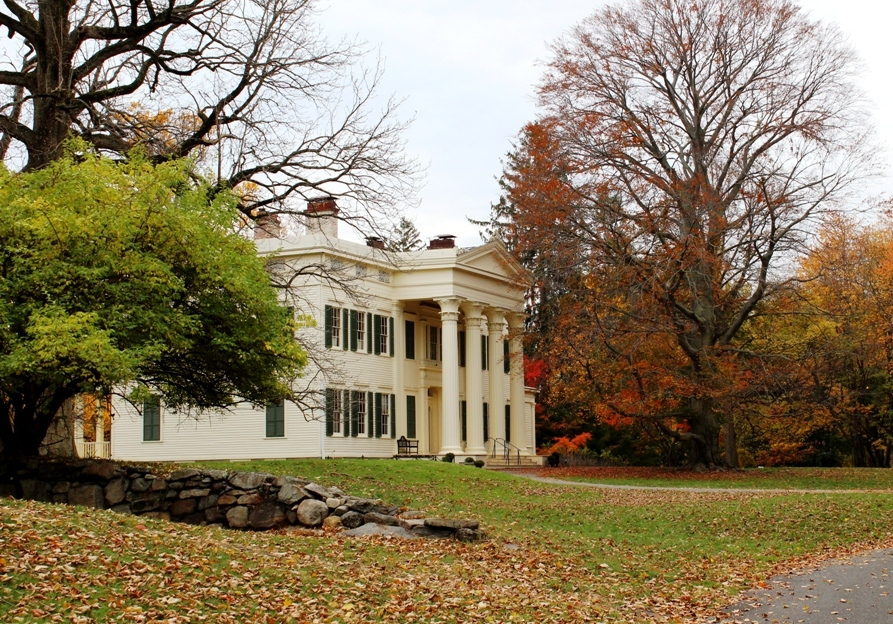
The Jay Estate in Rye, New York

In addition to his practice of medicine, he made a specialty of conchology, and acquired the most complete and valuable collection of shells in the United States. This and his costly library on this branch of science were purchased by Catharine Lorillard Wolfe and presented, in memory of her father, to the American Museum of Natural History, where it is known as the Jay Collection. In 1832 he became a member of the Lyceum of Natural History (now New York Academy of Sciences), and was its treasurer 1836–1843. He took an active part in the efforts that were made during that time to obtain subscriptions for a new building to house the society's collection, and bore the principal burden in planning and superintending its construction.

Jay was one of the original group of nine men who founded New York Yacht Club in 1844. In addition to racing in regattas, he served for some time as the club's secretary. From 1859 until 1880, he was a trustee of Columbia College. The shells collected by the expedition of Com. Matthew C. Perry to Japan was submitted to him for examination, and he wrote the article on that subject in the government reports. Jay wrote Catalogue of Recent Shells (New York, 1835), Description of New and Rare Shells (1836), and later editions of his catalogue, in which he enumerates about 11,000 well-marked varieties, and at least 7,000 well-established species.

== Personal life ==
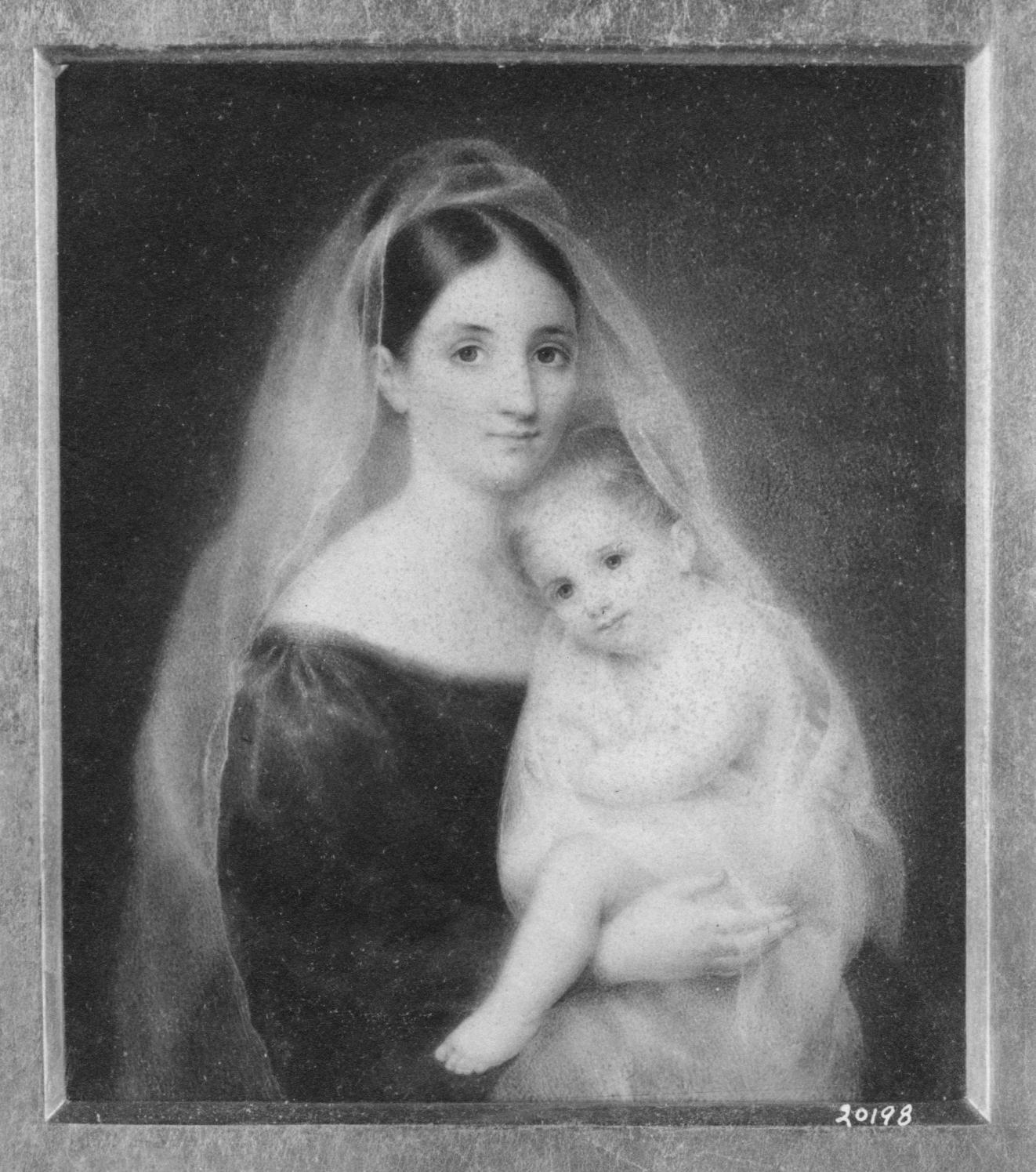
Miniature portrait of Jay's wife Laura and their daughter Laura, by Ann Hall

On November 8, 1831, Jay was married to Laura Prime (1812–1888). She was the daughter of prominent banker Nathaniel Prime (of Prime, Ward & King) and granddaughter of Comfort Sands, the celebrated merchant, banker and Continental Congressman. Together, they were the parents of eleven children, including:

- Laura Jay (1832–1910), who married Charles Pemberton Wurts (1824–1892), nephew and heir of John Wurts, in 1854.
- Mary Jay (1837–1897), who married Jonathan Edwards (1821–1882) in 1861.
- Cornelia Jay (1838–1907), who died at her residence, The Salamanca, at 155 West 58th Street, New York City.
- Peter Augustus Jay (1841–1875), who married Julia Post, daughter of Dr. Alfred C. Post.
- John Clarkson Jay (1844–1923), who married Harriette Arnold Vinton (1849–1914), daughter of Maj. Gen. David Hammond Vinton.
- Alice Jay (1846–1921).

Following the death of his father in 1843, he inherited the Jay family estate including the Jay Estate in Rye, New York and lived there with his family until his death in 1891. Today his home is the centerpiece of the Boston Post Road Historic District a National Historic Landmark and managed by the Jay Heritage Center. Jay died on November 15, 1891, in Rye, New York.

=== Descendants ===
Through his son Peter, he was the grandfather of Pierre Jay (1870–1949), the first chairman of the Federal Reserve Bank of New York, and Mary Rutherfurd Jay (1872–1953), one of America's earliest landscape architects.
