= Mount Tamalpais Cemetery =

Cemetery and mortuary in Marin County, California

Coordinates: 37°59′21″N 122°33′16″W

Mount Tamampais Cemetery
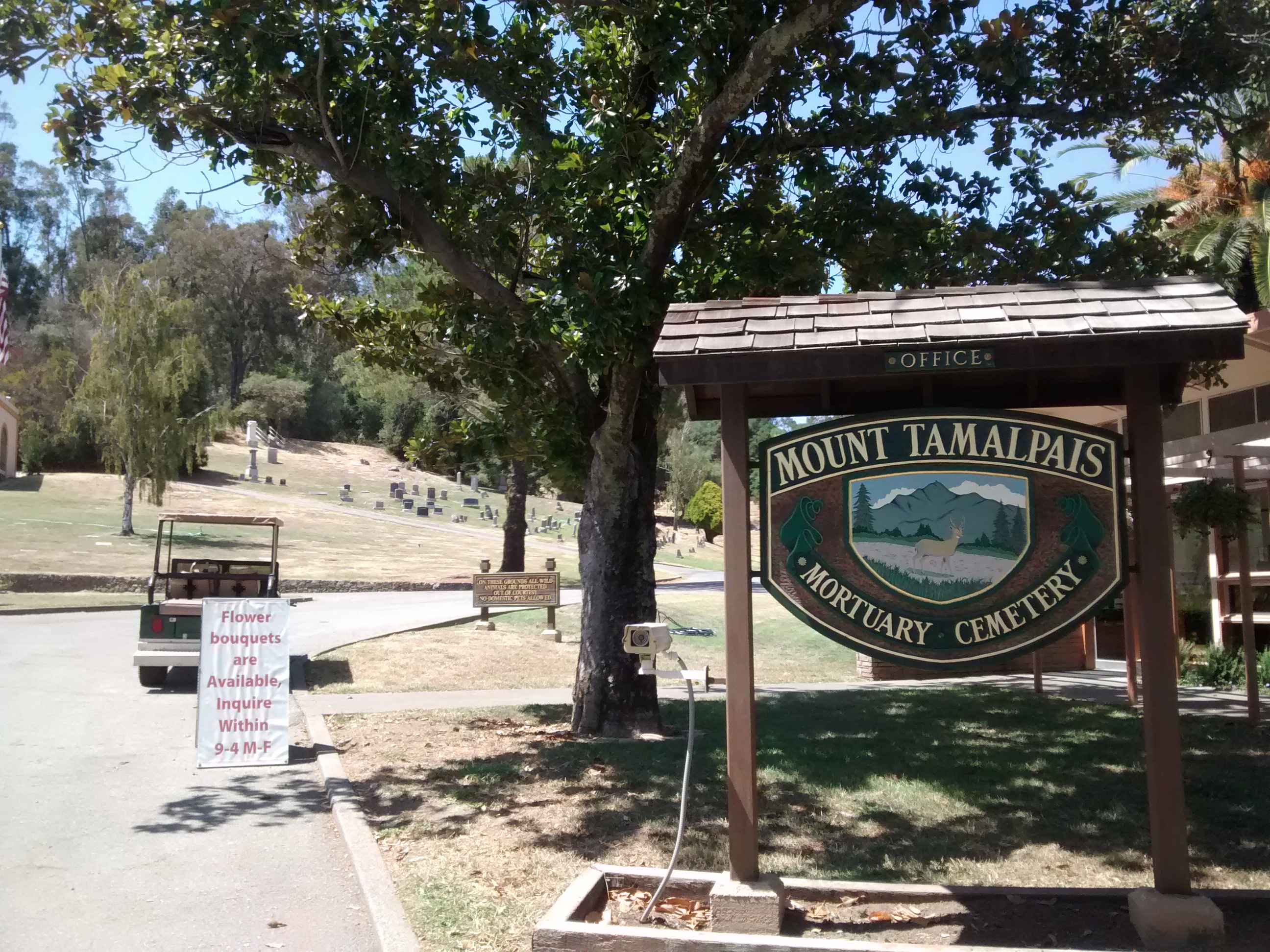
- Interactive map of Mount Tamampais Cemetery

Details
- Established: 1879
- Abandoned: 2025
- Location: San Rafael, California, United States
- Size: 65 acres
- No. of graves: ~24,000
- Website: Mt. Tamalpais Cemetery
- Find a Grave: Mount Tamampais Cemetery

Mount Tamalpais Cemetery is a cemetery in San Rafael, California. It is located adjacent to Sorich Park, with trails providing access to the cemetery grounds.

== History ==
The cemetery was founded by Dr. Henry A. Dubois, Jr. An ordinance had been passed in the 1870s that prohibited any burials within the towns limits. Dr DuBois attended a town hall meeting where he among many others offered bids to start up a new cemetery. DuBois' bid of $13,000 for a part of his ranch was the ultimate winner. He toured over 40 cemeteries and drew up plans before the cemetery was being built so he could figure out the best possible layout for the cemetery. After hiring around 40 men, most of who were Chinese Laborers, the cemetery was finally completed in August 1879.

In June, 2022, the California Cemetery and Funeral Bureau accused the cemetery owners of mismanaging its Eternal Care Fund.

In July, 2025, the California Cemetery and Funeral Bureau stated that the cemetery is considered unlicensed or abandoned.

== Notable interments ==
- Bessie Barriscale (1884–1965), actress
- Maurice Carey Blake (1815–1897), Mayor of San Francisco
- Robert Dollar (1844–1932), businessman
- Henry Augustus DuBois (1840–1897), surgeon and Mount Tamalpais Cemetery founder
- Seldon Connor Gile (1877–1947), dominant painter in the "Society of Six"
- Jack Finney (1911–1995), author
- Don Flickinger (1907–1997), US Air Force flight surgeon and brigadier general
- Lefty Gomez (1908–1989), Hall of Fame baseball player
- Howard C. Hickman (1880–1949), actor
- Russ Hodges (1910–1971), sportscaster
- Ali Akbar Khan (1922–2009), Indian classical musician
- William S. Mailliard (1917–1992), US Representative
- James B. McNamara (1882–1941), bomber of the Los Angeles Times building in 1910
- Ernie Nevers (1903–1976), professional football and baseball player
- June Pointer (1953–2006), pop singer
- Chet Powers, a.k.a. Dino Valenti and Jesse Oris Farrow (1937–1994), singer-songwriter
- Sally Stanford (1903–1982), civic personality
- Diane Varsi (1938–1992), actress

== See also ==
- List of cemeteries in California
