= Peter Augustus Jay (lawyer) =

American lawyer and politician (1776-1843)

Recorder of New York City
- In office April 6, 1819 – March 6, 1821
- Preceded by: Richard Riker
- Succeeded by: Richard Riker

Member of the New York State Assembly from New York Co.
- In office July 1, 1815 – June 30, 1816

Personal details
- Born: Peter Augustus Jay; January 24, 1776 Elizabethtown, New Jersey, U.S.
- Died: February 20, 1843 (aged 67) New York City, U.S.
- Party: Federalist
- Spouse: Mary Rutherfurd Clarkson (m. 1807; died 1838)
- Children: John Clarkson Jay; Peter Augustus Jay (born 1821)
- Parent(s): John Jay; Sarah Van Brugh Livingston
- Relatives: William Jay (brother); William Livingston (grandfather); Augustus Jay (grandson)
- Education: Columbia College

Peter Augustus Jay (January 24, 1776 – February 20, 1843) was a prominent New York lawyer, politician and the eldest son of Founding Father and first United States Chief Justice John Jay.

== Early life ==
Peter Augustus Jay was born at Liberty Hall on January 24, 1776, at the home of his maternal grandparents' in Elizabethtown, New Jersey. Peter was one of six children born to John Jay and Sarah Van Brugh (née Livingston) Jay, and one of two boys (brother William was born in 1789) with four sisters: Susan (born and died in 1780); Maria (b. 1782), Ann (b. 1783) and Sarah Louisa (b. 1792).

Jay's paternal grandparents were Peter Jay, who was born in New York City in 1704 and became a wealthy trader in furs, wheat, timber, and other commodities, and Mary Van Cortlandt, who had married in 1728. Mary's father was Jacobus Van Cortlandt who was twice mayor of New York City.

His mother was the eldest daughter of 13 children born to New Jersey Governor William Livingston (1723–1790). His aunt, Susannah Livingston, was married to John Cleves Symmes. His grandfather, William, was the son of Philip Livingston, himself the son of Robert Livingston the Elder and Alida Schulyer van Rensselaer.

Following in the footsteps of his father, who graduated from the colonial-era King's College, Peter graduated from Columbia University in 1794.

== Career ==
Following his graduation in 1794, Jay acted as private secretary to his father in London for the Jay Treaty. The young Jay studied law and established a practice in New York City with his cousin Peter Jay Munro, carrying on a family tradition of public service.

As a Federalist, he was a member from New York City of the New York State Assembly in the 39th New York State Legislature, during which time he was active in arranging the financing for the construction of the Erie Canal. He ran many times for Congress, but was always defeated by the Democratic-Republican candidates. From 1819 to 1821, he was Recorder of New York City. He was a delegate from Westchester Co. to the New York State Constitutional Convention of 1821. For a time he was also a Westchester County Judge.

=== Philanthropy and Affiliations ===
In 1814, Jay and his father were both elected members of the American Antiquarian Society. Together with financier Thomas Eddy, Peter Augustus Jay also helped organize and found New York's earliest savings bank, the now defunct New York Bank for Savings in 1816 (thereby contributing to the establishment of the New York State savings bank system). In 1828, he helped found the New York Law Institute, which today is the oldest law library in New York City. Jay was President of New York Hospital (1827–1833), Chairman of the Board of Trustees, King's College and President of the New-York Historical Society (1840–1842).

In 1832, he was honored with a Doctor of Laws from Harvard University for his "talents and virtues", and from Columbia, in 1835.

Jay shared his father's commitment to social justice and actively pursued greater rights for African Americans. In his commitment to reform, he served as President of the New-York Manumission Society in 1816 and President of the New York Public School Society which was anti-slavery and concerned with greater humanitarianism towards the poor. Jay is best known for giving a speech in 1821 at the New York State Constitutional Convention as a delegate arguing that the right to vote should be extended to free African Americans. "Peter Augustus Jay, one of a minority of advocates of universal manhood suffrage, insisted that the idea that black people were naturally inferior had long been 'completely refuted and universally exploded.'" Despite his impassioned argument, Jay's motion for extending suffrage was overruled.

== Personal life ==
On July 29, 1807, he married Mary Rutherfurd Clarkson (1786–1838), a daughter of General Matthew Clarkson and Mary (née Rutherfurd) Clarkson. Her uncle was U.S. Senator John Rutherfurd and her paternal grandfather was Walter Rutherfurd. Together, they had eight children, including:

- John Clarkson Jay (1808–1891), who married Laura Prime (1812–1888) and was a physician and noted conchologist.
- Mary Rutherfurd Jay (1810–1835), who married Frederick Prime in 1829.
- Sarah Jay (1811–1846), who married William Dawson in 1836.
- Catherine Helena Jay (1815–1889), who married Henry Augustus DuBois (1808–1884) in 1835.
- Anna Maria Jay (1819–1902), who married Henry Evelyn Pierrepont (1808–1888), a son of Hezekiah Pierrepont, in 1841.
- Peter Augustus Jay (1821–1855), who married Josephine Pearson (1829–1852) in 1848.
- Elizabeth Clarkson Jay (1823–1895).
- Susan Matilda Jay (1827–1910), who married Matthew Clarkson (1823–1913), the eldest son of David Clarkson (president of the New York Stock Exchange), in 1852.

His wife died in Madeira, an archipelago in the north Atlantic Ocean, southwest of Portugal, on December 24, 1838. Peter Augustus Jay died in New York City on February 20, 1843.

His descendants have gone on to become educators, lawyers, diplomats and civic advocates. They include Mary Rutherfurd Jay, Pierre Jay, and Jay Pierrepont Moffat and John Jay Pierrepont.

=== Jay Estate ===
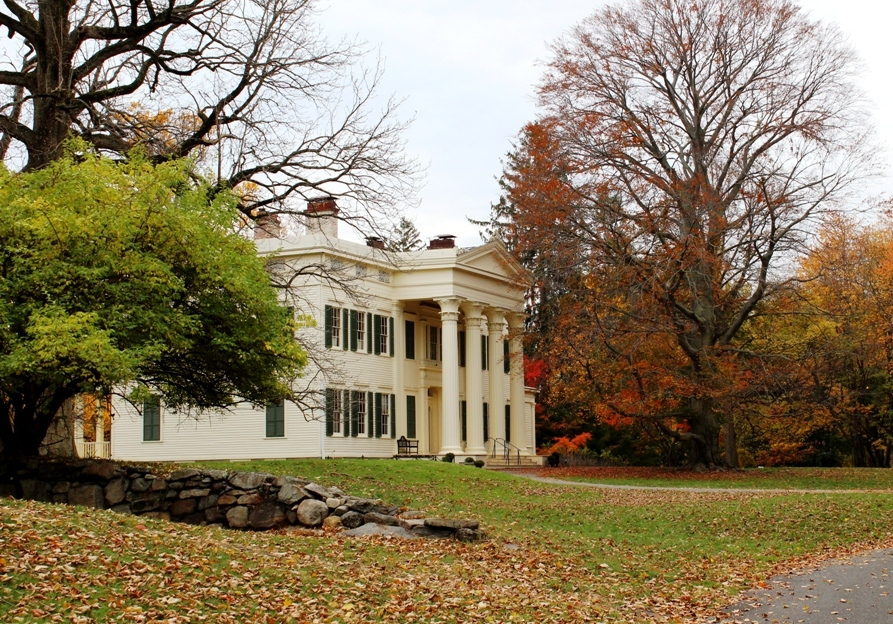
The Jay Estate in Rye, New York

Peter Augustus legally received the Jay Estate in Rye from his father in 1822 though original account records show that he and his wife Mary were handling household expenses as for the Rye estate as early as 1814. Under his father's aegis, Peter Augustus installed European styled stone ha-has on the property and planted elm trees. His father John Jay died in 1829. In 1836, Peter Augustus contracted with a builder, Edwin Bishop, to take down the failing farmhouse that had been barraged by the British during the Revolutionary War. Reusing structural elements from "The Locusts" where his father grew up as a boy, Peter Augustus Jay helped create the Greek Revival mansion that stands there today. Unfortunately his wife Mary would not live to see the house completed, as she died in Madeira on December 24, 1838. After Jay's death in 1843, the Rye house passed to his eldest son, John Clarkson Jay.

The Jay Estate is a National Historic Landmark within the Boston Post Road Historic District (Rye, New York) as well as a Save America's Treasures Project; NHL designation is the highest recognition conferred by the US government for a historic site—out of more than 80,000 places on the National Register, only about 2,430 are NHLs. The Jay mansion is currently being preserved and restored by the non-profit organization, the Jay Heritage Center, for use as an educational center with programs in American history. In November 2008, it became the first NHL structure in Westchester County and the oldest NHL in New York State to be fitted with a geothermal heating and cooling system.

Peter Augustus Jay and John Jay's leadership roles in the abolition of slavery are regularly examined in a program at the Jay Heritage Center called "Striving for Freedom". It is because of this legacy of social justice that the Jay site was added to the Westchester County African American Heritage Trail in 2004.

== See also ==
- United States House of Representatives elections in New York, 1806
- United States House of Representatives elections in New York, 1810
- United States House of Representatives elections in New York, 1812

Legal offices
Preceded by Richard Riker	Recorder of New York City; 1819–1821	Succeeded by Richard Riker
