= Duncan Elliot =

American banker and soldier (1862–1919)

- Born: October 1, 1862; New York City, New York, U.S.
- Died: November 2, 1919 (aged 57); Annapolis, Maryland, U.S.
- Education: Columbia University
- Spouse: Sallie Hargous (m. 1891; div. 1901)
- Children: 3
- Parent(s): George Thompson Elliot Jr. Sally Duncan Elliot
- Relatives: Daniel Giraud Elliot (uncle)

Duncan Elliot (October 1, 1862 – November 2, 1919) was an American banker and soldier who was prominent in New York society during the Gilded Age.

== Early life ==
Elliot was born in New York City on October 1, 1862. He was the son of Dr. George Thompson Elliot Jr. (1827–1871) and Sally (née Duncan) Elliot (1834–1888). His father was a prominent physician at Bellevue Hospital in New York. After his father's death in 1871, he mother remarried to Jacob Post Giraud Foster (1827–1886). His brother was Richard Elliot.

His maternal grandparents were William T. Duncan and Rebecca (née Lincoln) Duncan. His paternal grandparents were George Thompson Elliot Sr. and Rebecca Giraud (née Foster) Elliot. His uncle was zoologist Daniel Giraud Elliot. Through his Elliot grandfather, he was descended from Richard Treat, an early colonist from Wethersfield, Connecticut, and through his Foster grandmother, he was descended from the Girauds who emigrated from France with the Huguenots.

== Career ==
After graduating from Columbia University in 1884, Elliot began his career with a banking house in New York. During the Spanish American War, he served as a cavalry officer. He later volunteered for service with the 26th Volunteer Infantry as Adjutant in the Philippines in 1899 during the Philippine–American War, with the assistance of then governor Theodore Roosevelt and U.S. Representative William Astor Chanler.

In 1917, he was assigned commandant of cadets at St. John's College in Annapolis by the War Department and, the following year, was promoted to colonel.

=== Society life ===
In 1892, Elliot and his wife Sallie were included in Ward McAllister's "Four Hundred", purported to be an index of New York's best families, published in The New York Times. Conveniently, 400 was the number of people that could fit into Mrs. Astor's ballroom.

During their marriage, his wife occupied Dellmain Cottage on Narragansett Avenue in Newport, Rhode Island, before purchasing the William Starr-Miller place on Bellevue Avenue. The Miller home, a French Norman-style "cottage", was commissioned by William Starr Miller II and designed by Miller's brother-in-law, Whitney Warren (a partner in Warren and Wetmore) and named High Tide, with interiors by noted designer Ogden Codman.

== Personal life ==
On September 15, 1891, Elliot was married to heiress Sallie Jeannette Hargous at All Saints' Memorial Church in Newport. Sallie, who was described as "the handsomest, richest, brightest, gayest, most admired young women in the upper-most circles of society", was the sister of Robert L. Hargous (who lived in Venice, Italy), Nina Hargous Appleton, and Anita Hargous de Forest, was considered "one of the most popular members of the younger set," and had inherited a fortune when she became of age. Sallie and Duncan, "the tall blonde athlete" were introduced by her brother at an "Apple Blossom Ball" in 1890. Together, they were the parents of three children, all boys:

- Duncan Elliot Jr. (b. 1893), who became a naturalized British subject and married the English born Miriam Stammers.
- Robert Hargous Elliot (b. 1896), who also became a naturalized British subject and married Iris Medora Stammers, the sister of his brother's wife, in 1917.
- Giraud Elliot, who left Harrow to enlist and fight in World War I. He received the Military Cross for gallantry under fire in 1917. He later married the American, Elizabeth Sands.

In 1901, after several years of rumors, and much speculation in the media regarding his drunkenness and philandering, his wife filed for divorce. After their divorce, his former wife remarried to Woodbury Kane in 1905, a few months before his death. After his death, Elliot reportedly tried to get Sallie to remarry him, but she refused and instead, married Douglas Howard Gill of the British Army.

In poor health, Elliot committed suicide in Annapolis, Maryland, on November 2, 1919. After a service at St. Anne's Protestant Episcopal Church in Annapolis, he was buried in at Woodlawn Cemetery in the Bronx.
