= Sybil Kent Kane =

- Born: 1856; Newport, Rhode Island, U.S.
- Died: February 15, 1946 (aged 89–90); Long Island City, New York, U.S.
- Burial place: Island Cemetery
- Relatives: Astor family

Sybil Kent Kane (1856 – February 15, 1946) was an American socialite who was prominent in New York Society during the Gilded Age.

== Early life ==
Kane was born at the family home on August 28, 1844, in Newport, Rhode Island. She was the second youngest of eight children born to Oliver DeLancey Kane and Louisa Dorothea (née Langdon). Kane's brothers were Walter Langdon Kane, John Innes Kane, DeLancey Astor Kane, S. Nicholson Kane, and Woodbury Kane. Her sisters were the artist Louisa Langdon Kane, and Emily Astor Kane (who married Augustus Jay and was the mother of Peter Augustus Jay).

She was a granddaughter of Walter Langdon and Dorothea (née Astor) of the Astor family and a great-granddaughter of John Jacob Astor. Kane was also a cousin of Lt. Col. John Jacob Astor IV. Her paternal lineage descended from John O'Kane who emigrated to the country in 1752 from County Londonderry and Antrim, Ireland. During the American Revolutionary War, O'Kane (who dropped the "'O" once in America) was living at Sharyvogne, his estate in Dutchess County, which was confiscated after the War due to his Loyalist times. His eldest son, John Jr., stayed and became one of the most prominent merchants in New York.

In New York, the family lived at 23 West 47th Street. In Newport, the family lived at "Beach Cliffe", designed by Detlef Lienau, which was one of the earliest Newport cottages "to attain a sort of Beaux-Arts purity." (Note: "Beach Cliffe", built in 1852, was located on Bath Road at Rhode Island Avenue in Newport. It was torn down in 1939.)

== Society life ==
In 1892, Kane, as the youngest unmarried daughter of her parents, and two of her brothers (Nicholson, DeLancey, and his wife Eleanora Iselin) were included in Ward McAllister's "Four Hundred", purported to be an index of New York's best families, published in The New York Times. Conveniently, 400 was the number of people that could fit into Mrs. Astor's ballroom.

== Personal life ==
Kane, who never married and had no children, lived a relatively modest life at her home in Little Neck on Long Island. She inherited from her parents and siblings, several of whom also died unmarried, upon their deaths. Kane died at her home on Long Island on February 15, 1946, and was the last surviving member of her immediate family. Her funeral services were held at the Chapel of the Comforter at 10 Horatio Street in New York City and she was buried alongside her family at the Island Cemetery in Newport.
