= Peter Jay Sharp Theater =

Peter Jay Sharp Theater may refer to several theaters named after the former owner of Douglas Elliman and the Carlyle Hotel:

- an Off-Broadway stage at Playwrights Horizons
- a theater at the Juilliard School
- a theater at Symphony Space
- The Peter Jay Sharp Building at the Brooklyn Academy of Music houses the Howard Gilman Opera House and the Rose Cinema.

== See also ==
- Peter Jay (disambiguation)
- Peter Sharp (disambiguation)
