= Peter Sharp =

Peter Sharp or Sharpe may refer to:

- Peter Sharp (rugby league) (born 1954), Australian rugby league coach
- Peter Sharp (cricketer) (1939–2012), New Zealand cricketer
- Peter Sharp (artist) (born 1964), Australian artist
- Peter Sharpe (1777–1842), American politician
- Peter Sharpe (cricketer) (born 1944), English cricketer

== See also ==
- Peter Jay Sharp Theater (disambiguation)
