= Peter Jay =

Peter Jay may refer to:

- Peter Jay (diplomat) (1937–2024), English economist, broadcaster, and diplomat
- Peter Jay (born 1944), drummer and leader of Peter Jay and the Jaywalkers

== See also ==
- Peter Augustus Jay (disambiguation)
- Peter Jay Sharp Theater (disambiguation)
- 1838 Peter Augustus Jay House, named for Peter A. Jay
