= Sorich Park =

Park in California, United States

Coordinates: 37.992°N 122.562°W

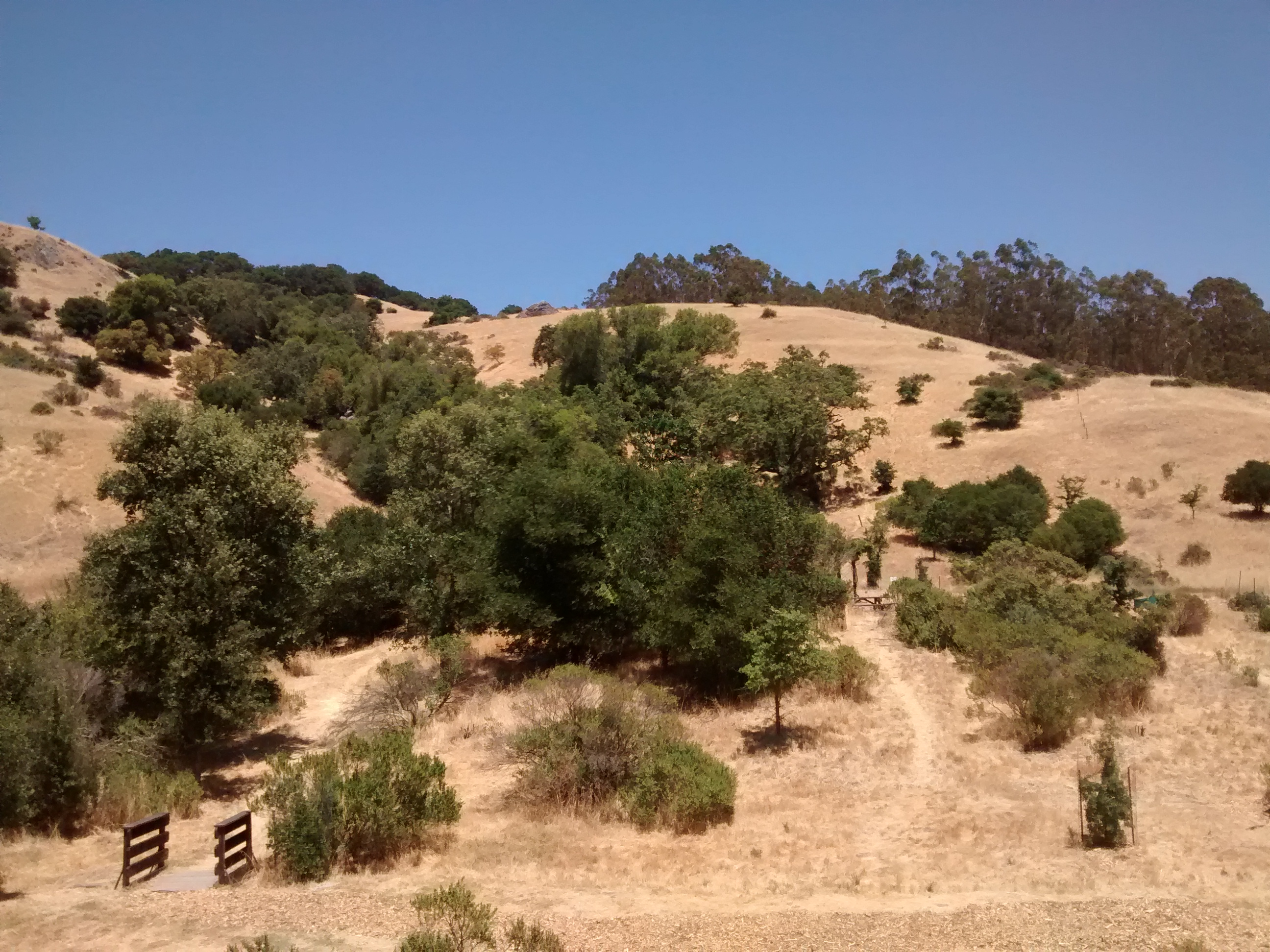
Sorich Park in summer 2016

Sorich Park is a nature preserve in San Anselmo, California, US. It has trails leading into the surrounding hills and ridge line, eventually connecting with Loma Alta Preserve. The park borders the western part of central San Rafael, California, as well as Sleepy Hollow (part of unincorporated county land).

About 60 acres in size, Sorich Park was acquired by the Town of San Anselmo in 1965. Prior to its acquisition by the town, it served as a dairy ranch. The park is named for the rich quality of the milk that was produced on the dairy ranch, which was "so rich" it became the namesake of the land.

Sorich Park provides trail access to multiple neighborhoods of San Anselmo and San Rafael. Its points of interest include the Mount Tamalpais Cemetery (one of the oldest cemeteries in the area, first established in 1879), and Point Resolve, a lookout point from which hikers can enjoy views of the Ross Valley, San Francisco, and Mount Tamalpais. Sorich Park's trails also grant easy access to nearby C. Frederick Faude Park and its centerpiece, Hard Hill.
