= Peter Augustus Jay (diplomat) =

American diplomat (1877-1933)

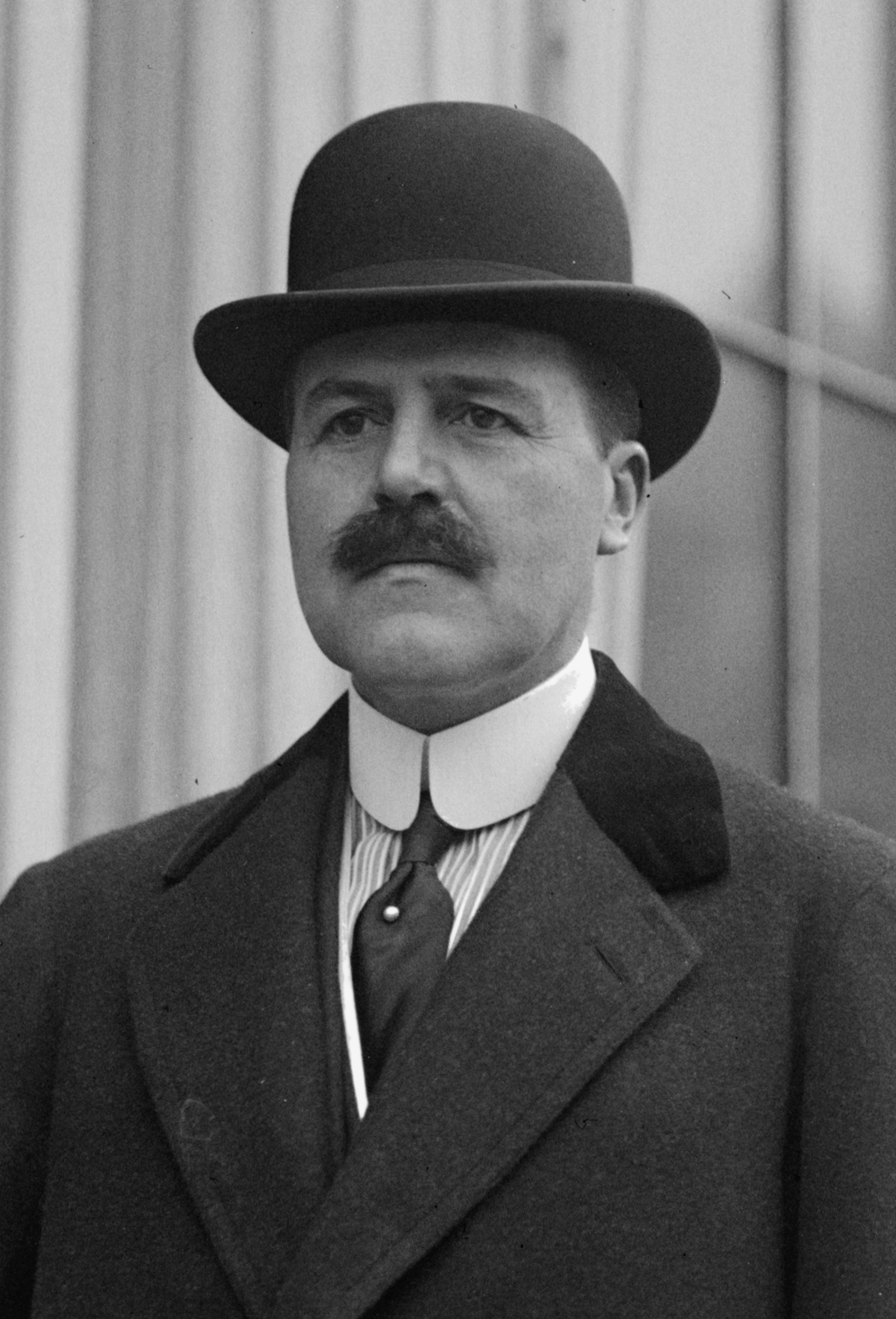
- Jay in 1923

23rd United States Ambassador to Argentina
- In office September 24, 1925 – December 30, 1926
- President: Calvin Coolidge
- Preceded by: John W. Riddle
- Succeeded by: Robert Woods Bliss

United States Ambassador to Romania
- In office June 30, 1921 – May 9, 1925
- President: Warren G. Harding; Calvin Coolidge
- Preceded by: Charles J. Vopicka
- Succeeded by: William S. Culbertson

United States Ambassador to El Salvador
- In office February 10, 1921 – April 28, 1921
- President: Woodrow Wilson
- Preceded by: Frank D. Arnold
- Succeeded by: Montgomery Schuyler Jr.

United States Ambassador to Egypt
- In office November 28, 1910 – October 8, 1913
- President: William Howard Taft
- Preceded by: Lewis M. Iddings
- Succeeded by: Olney Arnold

Personal details
- Born: August 23, 1877 Newport, Rhode Island, U.S.
- Died: October 18, 1933 (aged 56) Washington, D.C.
- Spouse: Susan Alexander McCook (m. 1909)
- Relations: Peter Augustus Jay (grandfather)
- Children: 2, including Susan Mary Alsop
- Parent(s): Augustus Jay; Emily Astor Kane
- Education: Eton College
- Alma mater: Harvard University (AB)

Peter Augustus Jay (August 23, 1877 – October 18, 1933) was an American diplomat who served as U.S. General Consul to Egypt, U.S. Minister to El Salvador and Romania and U.S. Ambassador to Argentina.

== Early life ==
Jay was born on August 23, 1877, in Newport, Rhode Island, to Augustus Jay (1850–1919) and Emily Astor (née Kane) Jay (1854–1932). His younger brother was DeLancey Kane Jay (1881–1941).

His paternal grandparents were Josephine (née Pearson) Jay and Peter Augustus Jay, himself the son of Peter Augustus Jay, a member of the New York State Assembly and Recorder of New York City, and grandson of John Jay, Founding Father and first United States Chief Justice. His maternal grandparents were DeLancey Kane and Louisa Dorothea (née Langdon) Kane. His maternal uncles included DeLancey Astor Kane, Commodore S. Nicholson Kane, and Rough Rider Woodbury Kane, all cousins of John Jacob Astor IV.

In 1880, Jay was painted by John Singer Sargent. Jay studied at Eton College in England and graduated from Harvard University with an A.B. in 1900.

== Career ==
In 1902, he began a career with the U.S. Foreign Service as the third secretary of the American embassy in Paris followed by service in Constantinople as second secretary. He was later promoted to secretary and when the legation was changed to an embassy, he continued as secretary until June 1907 when he became Chargé d'Affaires in Tokyo on July 7, 1908, where he received full powers to "exchange ratifications for the protection of inventions, designs trademarks and copyrights." He served in Japan until December 21, 1909 when he was appointed by President William Howard Taft as Consul General to Egypt in Cairo. He presented his credentials on November 28, 1910, and left his post on October 8, 1913.

On May 4, 1920, Jay was appointed U.S. Minister to El Salvador by President Woodrow Wilson, serving from February 10, 1921, until April 28, 1921. After being appointed on April 18, 1921 by President Warren G. Harding, he served from June 30, 1921 to May 9, 1925, as U.S. Minister to Romania, where he assisted in negotiating that country's repayment terms of $42,000,0000 for wartime and post World War I development loans. On March 18, 1925, he was appointed U.S. Ambassador to Argentina by President Calvin Coolidge. He presented his credentials on September 24, 1925, and was present on May 16, 1926 when a bomb exploded at the door to the US embassy, an action that might have been a protest of the guilty verdicts in the Sacco and Vanzetti trials.

=== Later life ===
While serving in Buenos Aires, his elder daughter Emily died following sleeping sickness and an operation for appendicitis. Two days later, on December 30, 1926, he resigned his post and returned to Washington, D.C. In 1928, he was appointed the American member of the Permanent International Commission established under the treaty between the United States and Spain on September 15, 1914.

== Personal life ==
On March 16, 1909, Jay was married to Susan Alexander McCook, the daughter of Civil War officer and prominent attorney John James McCook and granddaughter of Daniel McCook of the "Fighting McCooks". Together, they were the parents of Emily Kane Jay (1911–1926) and Susan Mary Alsop (1918–2004).

He was a member of the Metropolitan Club of Washington, the Knickerbocker Club, the Harvard Club of New York and the Racquet and Tennis Club of New York. The Jays also owned a home, Breakwater, in the Bar Harbor, Maine.

Jay died at his home, 1815 Q Street in Washington, D.C., on October 18, 1933.

Diplomatic posts
Preceded by John W. Riddle	U.S. Ambassador to Argentina; 1925–1926	Succeeded by Robert Woods Bliss
Preceded by Charles J. Vopicka	U.S. Minister to Romania; 1921–1925	Succeeded by William S. Culbertson
Preceded by Frank D. Arnold	U.S. Minister to El Salvador; 1921-1921	Succeeded by Montgomery Schuyler Jr.
Preceded by Lewis M. Iddings	U.S. General Consul to Egypt; 1910–1913	Succeeded by Olney Arnold
