= Susan Mary Alsop =

American socialite and writer (1918–2004)

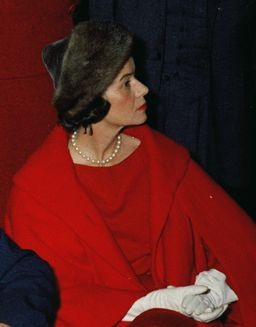
- Alsop at the White House in 1961
- Born: Susan Mary Jay; June 19, 1918; Rome, Italy
- Died: August 18, 2004 (aged 86); Washington, D.C.
- Education: Foxcroft School; Barnard College
- Occupations: Socialite; Writer
- Spouses: William Samuel Patten (m. 1939; died 1960) Joseph Alsop (m. 1961; div. 1978)
- Father: Peter Augustus Jay
- Relatives: John J. McCook (grandfather); Augustus Jay (grandfather)

Susan Mary Alsop (née Jay; June 19, 1918 – August 18, 2004) was an American writer and socialite active in Washington, D.C., political circles. She was the wife of columnist Joseph Alsop and a descendant of founding father John Jay. Her Georgetown home hosted dignitaries and publishers during the 1960s and 1970s ranging from John F. Kennedy, Phil Graham, Katharine Graham, and Isaiah Berlin, earning her the nickname "the grand dame of Washington society."

== Early life ==
Alsop was born Susan Mary Jay in Rome on June 19, 1918, to Susan Alexander McCook and U.S. diplomat Peter Augustus Jay, who served as U.S. General Consul to Egypt, U.S. Minister to El Salvador and Romania and U.S. Ambassador to Argentina. She had an older sister, Emily Kane Jay, who died young. Her paternal grandparents were Augustus Jay and Emily Astor (née Kane) Jay and her maternal grandfather was Civil War officer and prominent attorney John James McCook.

She attended Foxcroft School in Virginia and later took courses at Barnard College.

== Career ==
In 1939, she began working at Vogue magazine as a receptionist, writer and model.

Alsop authored several books and dozens of magazine articles. In 1975, she published a collection of letters, To Marietta from Paris, followed by Lady Sackville: A Biography (1978), about the Lady Victoria Sackville-West. She chronicled notable American diplomats in Yankees at the Court: The First Americans in Paris (1982), and The Congress Dances: Vienna 1814–1815 (1984). She was a contributing editor to Architectural Digest, in which she published some 70 articles.

== Personal life ==
In 1939, she married the diplomat William Samuel "Bill" Patten, and in 1945 helped him get a job with the American embassy in Paris. While in Paris, she began an affair with the British Ambassador Duff Cooper, 1st Viscount Norwich, that lasted until Cooper's death in 1954. She had a child with Cooper while still married to Patten. Her husband died in 1960, and the following year she married Joseph Alsop. Their marriage ended in divorce in 1978.

Alsop was on good terms with John F. Kennedy and his wife Jacqueline Kennedy: he visited her house on the day of his inauguration. She joined the White House Paintings Committee, and was influential enough to be termed the "Second Lady of Camelot".

Alsop died in Washington, D.C., on August 18, 2004. She was posthumously biographed by her son in his 2008 memoir My Three Fathers: And the Elegant Deceptions of My Mother, Susan Mary Alsop, and later by French former diplomat Caroline de Margerie in American Lady: The Life of Susan Mary Alsop (2012). Also in 2012 she was fictionalized in David Auburn's Broadway play The Columnist, based on Joseph Alsop's life, and portrayed by actress Margaret Colin.
