= S. Nicholson Kane =

American socialite (1846–1906)

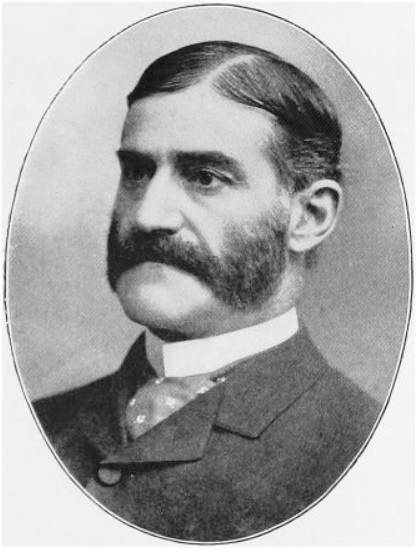
- Born: Samuel Nicholson Kane; July 2, 1846; New York City, New York, U.S.
- Died: November 15, 1906 (aged 60); Manassas, Virginia, U.S.
- Education: United States Naval Academy; Cambridge University; Albany Law School
- Parent(s): DeLancey Kane; Louisa Dorothea Langdon
- Relatives: Astor family

Samuel Nicholson Kane (July 2, 1846 – November 15, 1906) was an American soldier and sailor prominent in New York Society during the Gilded Age who served as the Commodore of New York Yacht Club.

== Early life ==
Kane was born on July 2, 1846, in New York City. He was one of eight children born to Oliver DeLancey Kane (1816–1874) and Louisa Dorothea (née Langdon) Kane (1821–1894). His brothers were Walter Langdon Kane, DeLancey Astor Kane, John Innes Kane, and Woodbury Kane. His sisters were Louisa Langdon Kane, Emily Astor Kane (who married Augustus Jay and was the mother of Peter Augustus Jay), and Sybil Kent Kane.

Kane's maternal grandparents were Walter Langdon and Dorothea (née Astor) Langdon of the Astor family. Dorothea's father was John Jacob Astor. He was a second cousin of Lt. Col. John Jacob Astor IV. His paternal lineage descended from John O'Kane, who emigrated to the country in 1752 from County Londonderry and Antrim, Ireland. During the American Revolutionary War, O'Kane (who dropped the "'O" once in America) was living at Sharyvogne, his estate in Dutchess County, which was confiscated after the War due to his Loyalist times. His eldest son, John Jr., stayed and became one of the most prominent merchants in New York.

The family lived at "Beach Cliffe", designed by Detlef Lienau, which was one of the earliest Newport cottages "to attain a sort of Beaux-Arts purity." (Note: "Beach Cliffe", built in 1852, was located on Bath Road at Rhode Island Avenue in Newport. It was torn down in 1939.) After prep school in New York, Kane attended and graduated from the United States Naval Academy at Annapolis, Maryland, in June 1866. After his service in the Navy, he entered Cambridge University in England, where he graduated in 1873. After returning to the United States, he studied law at Albany Law School.

== Career ==
After the Naval Academy, Kane was assigned the grade of ensign and began working on the staff of Admiral David Farragut. He resigned from the U.S. Navy in 1868. After the Navy, he attended university in England then returned to the United States for law school, and was admitted to the bar. Even though he was admitted, due to his "ample means", he did not practice his profession.

In 1874, he became a member of the New York Yacht Club, where he served as Commodore and an officer for many years. During the beginning of the Spanish–American War, he volunteered as an Ensign and, in ten days, was promoted to Senior Lieutenant, serving on the staff of Admiral Charles Dwight Sigsbee, serving until the end of the war. Kane was honorably discharged on November 15, 1898.

=== Society life ===
In 1892, Kane, along with two of his brothers and their wives, were included in Ward McAllister's "Four Hundred", purported to be an index of New York's best families, published in The New York Times. Conveniently, 400 was the number of people that could fit into Mrs. Astor's ballroom.

He was a member of the Union Club, Metropolitan Club, the Knickerbocker Club, the New York Yacht Club, and the American Geographical Society.

== Personal life ==
Kane lived at the Kane family mansion at 23 West 47th Street in Manhattan. In 1889, he was described as:

He is an enthusiastic yachtsman, and is an excellent whip. He has traveled much, is a discriminating collector of books, and is exceptionally well-like, being very affable and a raconteur of unusual eloquence.

Kane, who suffered from cirrhosis hepatitis, died of intestinal hemorrhages in a sleeping car in Manassas, Virginia, about thirty miles from Washington, D.C., on November 15, 1906. He had been in Hot Springs for three weeks seeking treatment. He was buried at Island Cemetery in Newport, Rhode Island.
