= Pierre Jay =

American banker

- Born: May 4, 1870; Warwick, New York, U.S.
- Died: November 24, 1949 (aged 79); New York City, New York, U.S.
- Education: Groton School; Yale University
- Occupation: Chair of the Federal Reserve Bank of New York
- Spouse: Louisa Shaw Barlow (m. 1897)
- Parent(s): Peter Augustus Jay; Julia Post Jay
- Relatives: Mary Rutherfurd Jay (sister); John Clarkson Jay (grandfather)

Pierre Jay (May 4, 1870 – November 24, 1949) was the first chairman of the Federal Reserve Bank of New York.

== Early life ==
Jay was born on May 4, 1870, in Warwick, New York. He was the son of Rev. Peter Augustus Jay (1841–1875), a protestant Episcopal clergyman, and Julia (née Post) Jay. Jay grew up in Rye, New York, at the Jay Estate ancestral home of his great-great-grandfather, American Founding Father, John Jay. Among his siblings was Mary Rutherfurd Jay, one of America's earliest landscape architects.

His maternal grandparents were Dr. Alfred Charles Post and Harriet (née Beers) Post and his paternal grandparents were John Clarkson Jay and Laura (née Prime) Jay (herself the daughter of prominent banker Nathaniel Prime of Prime, Ward & King).

Jay attended and graduated in 1888 from Groton School before attending Yale University and graduating in 1892. He became a member of Skull and Bones, one of the best-known of the secret societies based at Yale University. He received an honorary A.M. from Yale in 1917.

== Career ==
After Yale, he was associated with Post and Flagg, bankers in New York, where he served as vice president of the Old Colony Trust Company in Boston, from 1903 to 1906.

From 1906 to 1909, he was the Bank Commissioner of the Commonwealth of Massachusetts. In 1908, he, along with Bostonian businessman and philanthropist Edward Filene, helped organize public hearings on creating credit union legislation in Massachusetts, leading to the passage of the Massachusetts Credit Union Act in 1909. This legislation was the first to enable the formation of credit unions in the United States. Jay also became the first-ever chairman of the New York Federal Reserve in 1913 after its formation until January 1, 1927, when he was sent to Berlin to be the American member of the transfer committee under the Dawes Plan.

Jay was also one of the founders of Fiduciary Trust Company International, now a subsidiary of Franklin Templeton, serving as board chairman from 1930 to 1945, and honorary chairman in 1945.

== Personal life ==
In 1897, Jay was married to Louisa Shaw Barlow (d. 1965), the daughter of Maj. Gen. Francis Channing Barlow and Ellen (née Shaw) Barlow, sister of Col. Robert Gould Shaw. Her father served as New York Secretary of State and the State Attorney General. Together, they were the parents of:

- Ellen Jay (1898–1995), who married Lloyd K. Garrison.
- Anna Maricka "Nancy" Jay (1900–1982), who married Alexander Duer Harvey, the great-grandson of John Van Buren, second son of President Martin Van Buren.
- Frances Jay (1904–1979), who did not marry.
- Luiza Jay (1909–1980), who married Imre de Vegh, son of Charles de Vegh a member of the Upper Chamber of the Hungarian Parliament. She later married Lawrence W. Fox.

Jay died at his home, 133 East 64th Street in New York City on November 24, 1949.
