= Mary Rutherfurd Jay =

American landscape architect and activist

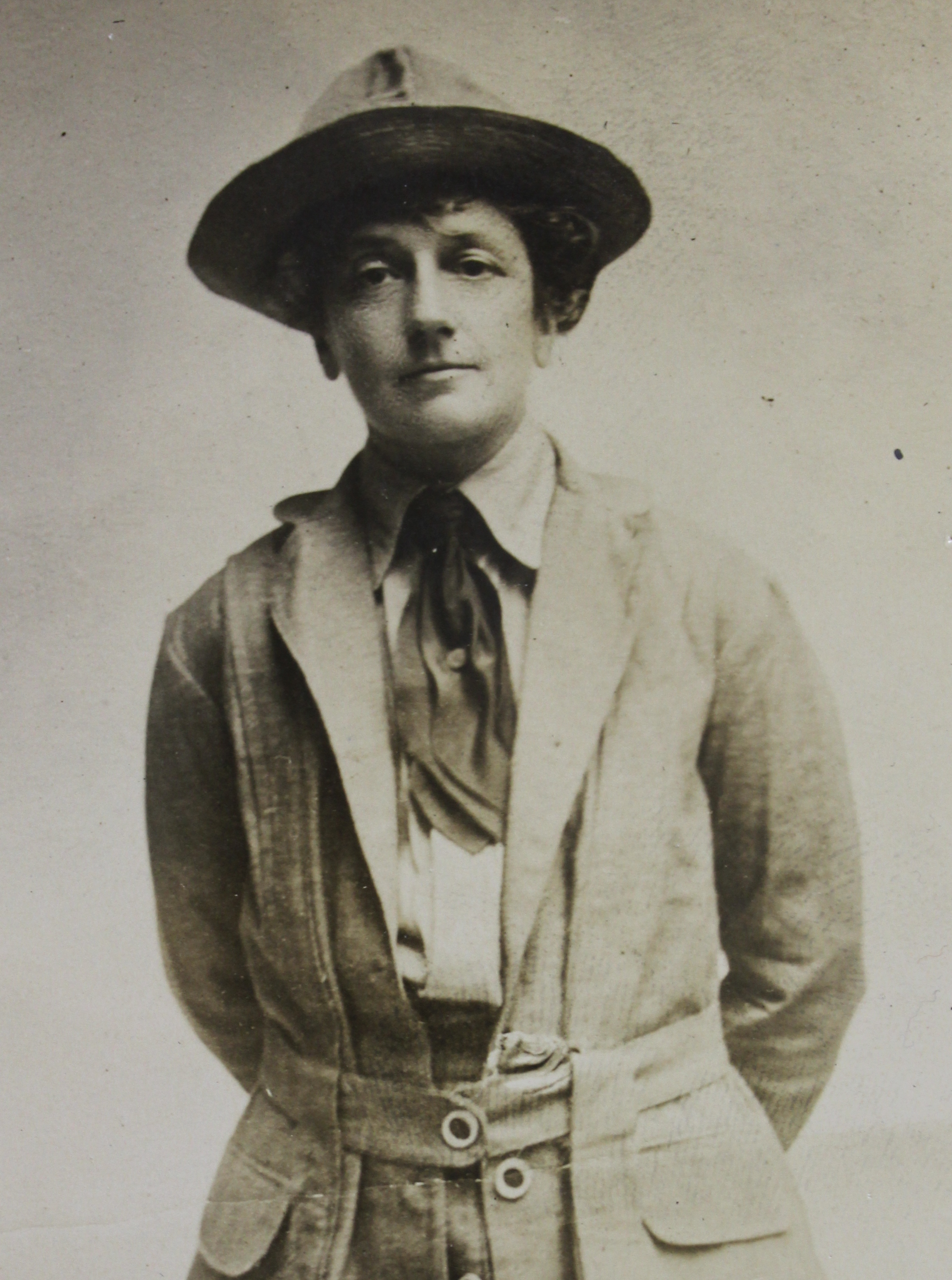
- Jay in 1918
- Born: Mary Rutherfurd Jay; August 16, 1872; Fair Haven, Connecticut
- Died: October 4, 1953 (aged 81); Manhattan, New York
- Occupation: Landscape architect
- Relatives: Pierre Jay, brother

Mary Rutherfurd Jay (1872–1953) was one of America's earliest landscape architects and an advocate of horticultural education and careers for women. The great-great granddaughter of American Founding Father John Jay, she grew up in Rye, New York, surrounded by the gardens of her ancestral homestead at the Jay Estate in Westchester County overlooking Long Island Sound. Her education was fostered by travel abroad with her mother and domestically through classes in design and horticulture taken at the Massachusetts Institute of Technology (MIT) and the Bussey Institute in Forest Hills, Massachusetts.

== Gardens (1907–1929) ==
Jay's first commission was a "plaisance" or pleasure garden in 1907 for the home of her sister Laura Jay Wells in the Round Hill neighborhood of Greenwich, Connecticut. "From this modest but well-measured beginning, her portfolio grew to more than 50 articulated projects for private residences all along the East Coast. Her projects varied widely in composition and plant material and demonstrated a comprehensive knowledge of English, French, Dutch, Indian, Italian, Turkish and Japanese design. With great facility, she learned the horticultural and architectural vocabulary of the grand estates of Europe and Asia - pleached allees of trees, plaisances, pergolas, moongates, parterres, rock gardens, pools and teahouses - and adapted these distinctive landscape elements to American gardens and soil conditions." An avid student of the French planner of the gardens of Versailles, Andre Le Notre, Jay called herself a "garden architect." She shared her knowledge freely with others as a lecturer in people's homes and as a contributor to magazines with large circulations such as House Beautiful and House & Garden as well as smaller niche journals such as The Touchstone.

Her plans were created for friends and clients as notable as New York architect, historian and social reformer Isaac Newton Phelps Stokes, author of the monumental series The Iconography of Manhattan Island; the families of financiers William Avery Rockefeller and William Goodsell Rockefeller of Greenwich, Connecticut; Remington Arms President Samuel F. Pryor; and yachtsmen C. Oliver Iselin and Henry R. Mallory. By 1926, she was one of the few women who leased office space in the Architects Building at 101 Park Avenue in Manhattan (the others being Marian Cruger Coffin and Ruth Dean), and her portfolio of projects ranged as far south as Palm Beach, Florida and as far north as Manchester-by-the-Sea, Massachusetts. Her colleagues included notable architects such as Addison Mizner, J. Alden Twachtman and Francis Keally; she collaborated with peers like Martha Brookes Hutcheson.

== Philanthropy and volunteer activities (1918–1919) ==
The Garden Club of America was formed in 1913 and many of its members sought out Jay's expertise as a judge for flower show competitions, an experienced speaker on visiting world gardens and as a personal design consultant for their own estates. As an advocate for women's education on a larger scale, Jay was an early member of the Women's Agricultural and Horticultural Association formed in 1914 to nurture and mentor women interested in pursuing her field as a career; this later became the Woman's National Farm and Garden Association (WNFGA). Jay also served on the board of the nascent Pennsylvania Horticulture School for Women, the precursor of today's Temple University Ambler, volunteering as Field Secretary to interest more people in the school and raise much needed funds.

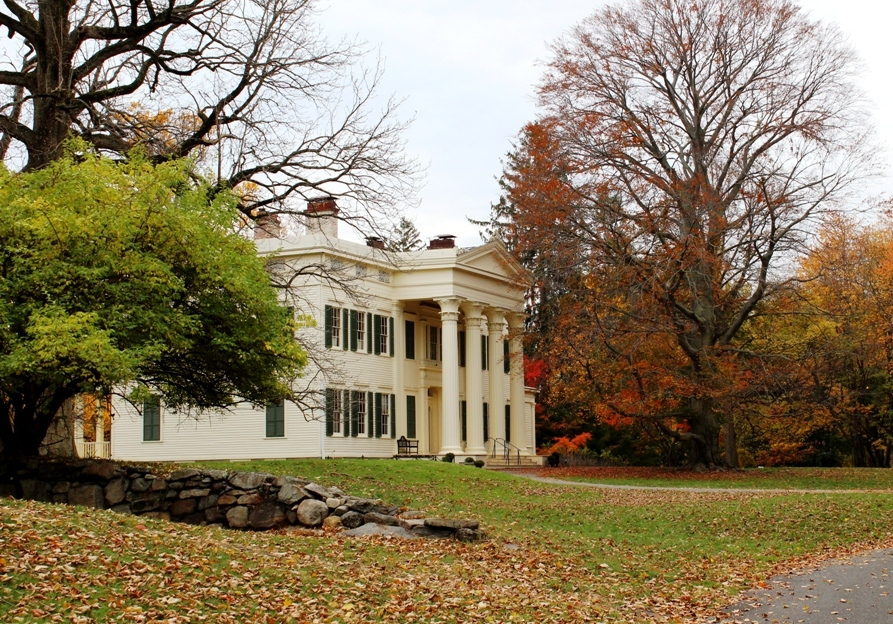
The Jay Estate in Rye, NY, today

As World War I came to a close, Jay shared and applied all that she had learned about the restorative power of gardens by working with the American Red Cross and the American Committee for Devastated France, a battalion of female volunteers organized by her friend Anne Morgan, daughter of banker and philanthropist John Pierpont Morgan. Jay's original mission was to supervise an agricultural unit to help residents of villages like Soissons in Aisne recover from the destruction of the Great War, but because of hostile activity in the area she was sent to Versailles instead to work with wounded and shell-shocked soldiers in the Garden Army Service.

== Author, lecturer and genealogist ==
The majority of Jay's landscape projects were completed between 1907 and the late 1920s. "The deaths of her brother John and mother Julia Post in 1928 and 1929 respectively seemed pivotal in changing the focus of her career to more writing." "In 1931 she completed The Garden Handbook, a small volume intended for use outside in the smallest to grandest of green spaces; it included descriptions and photos of historic gardens for reference as well as lists of blooming times for various species of flowers, shrubs and trees. Jay was a frequent and very popular speaker to many chapters of the Garden Club of America as well as horticultural societies around the country. She used over 100 luminous lantern slides per program to illustrate the beauty of gardens she had seen in the course of her journeys around the globe. With an evident passion for culture and history, her talks highlighted what had been lost in foreign countries during wartime but also emphasized the resilience of landscapes and the potential for what could be restored through design."

During this same period, she recorded the genealogical history of The Jay Family (1935) noting the family's origins in La Rochelle, France and visually illustrating their connections to other early New York families through marriage.

== Legacy ==
Jay died in New York in 1953. Her collection of slides was donated posthumously to her distant cousin and fellow landscape architect Beatrix Jones Farrand and the Reef Point Library in Maine. The Jay collection was subsequently moved to the Archives of University of California, Berkeley where they are available for study. The family gardens that inspired her to become a landscape architect are now being restored for public use. The site is the centerpiece of the Boston Post Road Historic District and designated a National Historic Landmark in 1993. The Jay Estate, including its gardens, is a member of the Hudson River Valley National Heritage Area. It was added to New York State's Path Through History in 2013.

An exhibit of Jay's work opened at the Jay Estate in 2015 and ran through 2016.
