= DeLancey Astor Kane =

American soldier and horseman

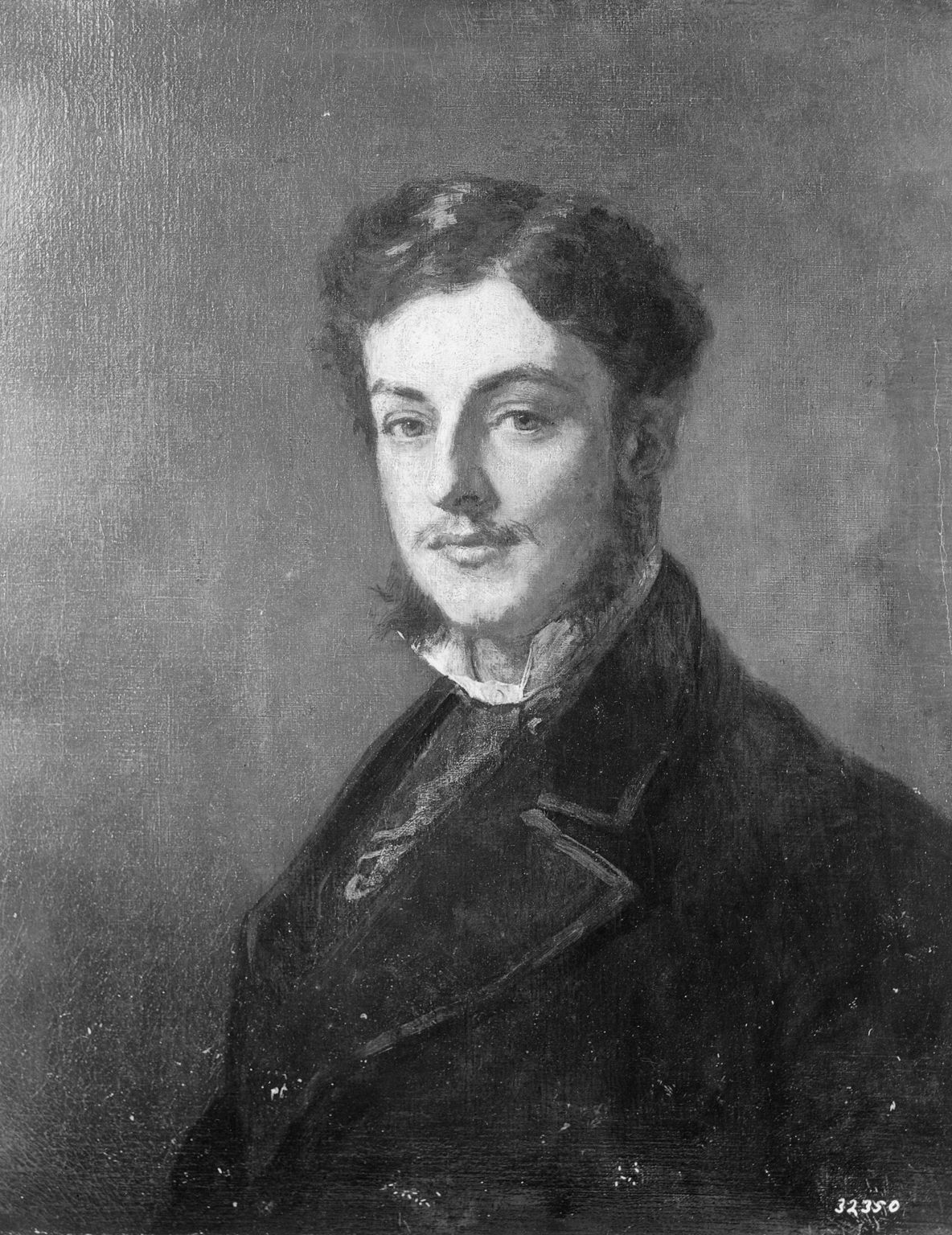
- portrait by Edward Harrison May
- Born: 28 August 1844; Newport, Rhode Island, U.S.
- Died: 4 April 1915 (aged 70); New Rochelle, New York, U.S.
- Education: United States Military Academy; Trinity College, Cambridge; Columbia Law School
- Occupations: Soldier, horseman
- Spouse: Eleanora Iselin (m. 1872)
- Children: Delancey Iselin Kane
- Parent(s): Oliver DeLancey Kane; Louisa Dorothea Langdon
- Family: Astor family

DeLancey Astor Kane (August 28, 1844 – April 4, 1915) was an American soldier and horseman who was prominent in New York Society during the Gilded Age. He was called the "father of coaching in the United States."

== Early life ==
Kane was born on August 28, 1844, in Newport, Rhode Island. He was the second of eight children born to Oliver DeLancey Kane (1816–1874) and Louisa Dorothea (née Langdon) Kane (1821–1894). His brothers were Walter Langdon, John Innes Kane, Woodbury Kane, and S. Nicholson Kane. His sisters were Louisa Langdon Kane, Emily Astor Kane (who married Augustus Jay and was the mother of Peter Augustus Jay), and Sybil Kent Kane.

Kane was a grandson of Walter Langdon and Dorothea (née Astor) Langdon of the Astor family and a great-grandson of John Jacob Astor. He was a cousin of Colonel John Jacob Astor IV. His paternal lineage descended from John O'Kane who emigrated to the country in 1752 from County Londonderry and Antrim, Ireland. During the American Revolutionary War, O'Kane (who dropped the "'O" once in America) was living at Sharyvogne, his estate in Dutchess County, which was confiscated after the War due to his Loyalist ties. His eldest son, John Jr., stayed and became one of the most prominent merchants in New York.

The family lived fashionably in lower Broadway. Their summer cottage, Beach Cliffe, designed by Detlef Lienau, was one of the earliest Newport houses "to attain a sort of Beaux-Arts purity." (Note: "Beach Cliffe", built in 1852, was located on Bath Road at Rhode Island Avenue in Newport. It was torn down in 1939.) Kane graduated from the United States Military Academy at West Point, New York, in 1868. Following his service in the United States Army, he studied at Trinity College, Cambridge, in England and in 1873, graduated from Columbia Law School.

== Career ==
Kane, who inherited $10,000,000 from his mother's family, was a lieutenant in the First Cavalry, U.S.A. from 1868 to 1870, when he retired as a colonel, a title by which he was known for most of his life.

In 1876, Kane founded, with Col. William Jay, Coaching Club of New York devoted to the coaching of horses which he picked up after his time spent in England. His stagecoach, "Tally-ho" was the first private stagecoach for pleasure riding in the United States.

=== Society life ===
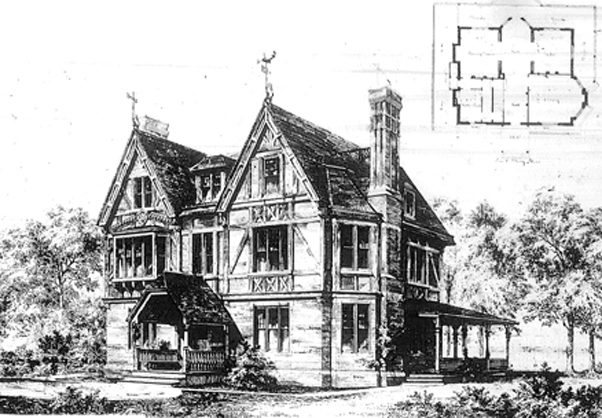
Kane's country estate, "The Paddocks" in New Rochelle, New York

In 1892, both Kane and his wife Eleanora were included in Ward McAllister's "Four Hundred", purported to be an index of New York's best families, published in The New York Times. Conveniently, 400 was the number of people that could fit into Mrs. Astor's ballroom.

He was a member of the Union Club, Metropolitan Club, the Knickerbocker Club, Country Club, the Coaching Club, the New York Yacht Club and the Larchmont Yacht Clubs. His wife's father built them a county estate, known as "The Paddocks" in Davenport Neck, New Rochelle. The estate had a panoramic view of the Long Island Sound and Fort Slocum.

== Personal life ==
In 1872, Kane was married to Eleanora Iselin (1849–1938), a daughter of merchant and banker Adrian Georg Iselin. Eleanora was also a sister of Adrian Jr., Columbus and Charles Iselin. In 1901, Kane and his wife purchased the former home of Arthur Astor Carey (Note: Arthur Astor Carey (1857–1923), was also a member of the Astor family through his mother, Mary Alida Astor (1826–1881), a daughter of William Backhouse Astor Sr.) in Newport for $100,000 where he became a permanent resident. Together, they were the parents of one child:

- DeLancey Iselin Kane (1877–1940), who was painted by Thomas Dewing in 1887.

Kane died of pneumonia on April 4, 1915, at the Kane estate in Davenport Neck in New Rochelle, New York. (Note: The Paddocks later became the Colony Club and was torn down in the 1980s to become the current Surf Club.)
