= Henry Augustus DuBois =

American surgeon

Henry Augustus DuBois (26 June 1840–1897) was a surgeon who founded the Mount Tamalpais Cemetery (Temaulpas).

== Family ==
Henry A. DuBois is the great-grandson of John Jay, the first Chief Justice of the U.S. Supreme Court, and the son of Henry Augustus DuBois, who served in the American Civil War and in the American Indian Wars of New Mexico.

== Biography ==
After serving in the American Civil War and in the American Indian Wars of New Mexico where he contracted the Chickahominy fever, Henry A. DuBois settled in San Rafael, a place he qualified as a "sanitarium for chronic diseases" when publishing in the California Medical Society’s journal. He resided with Alfred Taliaferro, the first physician in the area. He purchased a wide land west of San Rafael, and opened the Mount Tamalpais Cemetery in August 1879

In 1874, he launched the development program of Denver's San Rafael district.

In 1887, Henry A. Dubois created the Pacific Coast Vaccine Farm, the first vaccine farm on the west coast.

Henry A. Dubois died May 27, 1897, of the typhoid fever he contracted in Virginia.
