= Woodbury Kane =

American yacht racer (1859–1905)

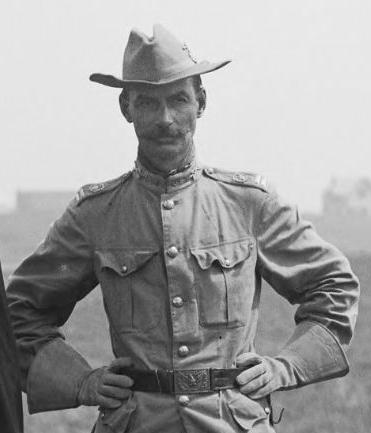
- Born: February 8, 1859; Newport, Rhode Island, U.S.
- Died: December 5, 1905 (aged 46); New York City, U.S.
- Education: Harvard University
- Occupations: Yachtsman, bon vivant
- Known for: Rough Riders
- Spouse: Sallie Hargous Elliot (m. 1905)
- Relatives: Delancey Astor Kane (brother); S. Nicholson Kane (brother); John Innes Kane (brother); Sybil Kent Kane (sister)

Woodbury Kane (February 8, 1859 – December 5, 1905) was a yachtsman and bon vivant, and member of Theodore Roosevelt's Rough Riders. A director of the Metropolitan Register Company, Kane served aboard the Columbia in the 1899 America's Cup race. He also was a noted hunter of big game, both in North America and South Africa.

He was a member of the New York Yacht Club (for many years serving on the club's America's Cup committee), the Metropolitan Club, the Knickerbocker Club, the Racquet Court Club, the Seawanhaka Corinthian Yacht Club, the Meadowbrook Hunt Club, the Hudson River Ice Yacht Club, the Larchmont Club, and the Yacht and Country Club.

== Early life ==
Kane was born on February 8, 1859, in Newport, Rhode Island. He was one of eight children born to Oliver Delancey Kane (1816–1874) and his wife Louisa (née Langdon) Kane (1821–1894). His siblings included Colonel Delancey Astor Kane, John Innes Kane, S. Nicholson Kane, Louisa Dorothea Kane, Emily Astor (née Kane) Jay, and Sybil Kent Kane. He was a cousin of Lt. Col. John Jacob Astor IV.

Woodbury entered Harvard College in the autumn of 1878; during university he was a member of the Hasty Pudding and Porcellian Clubs and other organizations. While at Harvard he became a close friend of Theodore Roosevelt. At Harvard, he played football and was considered an expert at cricket, tennis, and polo. He had a most charming personality, and his well-bred manner, his elegance of carriage and movement, his lithe and erect figure, and the zest with which he entered into tennis, football, boxing, and running races, together with his courtesy and good humor, made him conspicuous among his classmates.

After graduation he lived the easy life of a gentleman in New York and Newport.

== Spanish–American War service ==
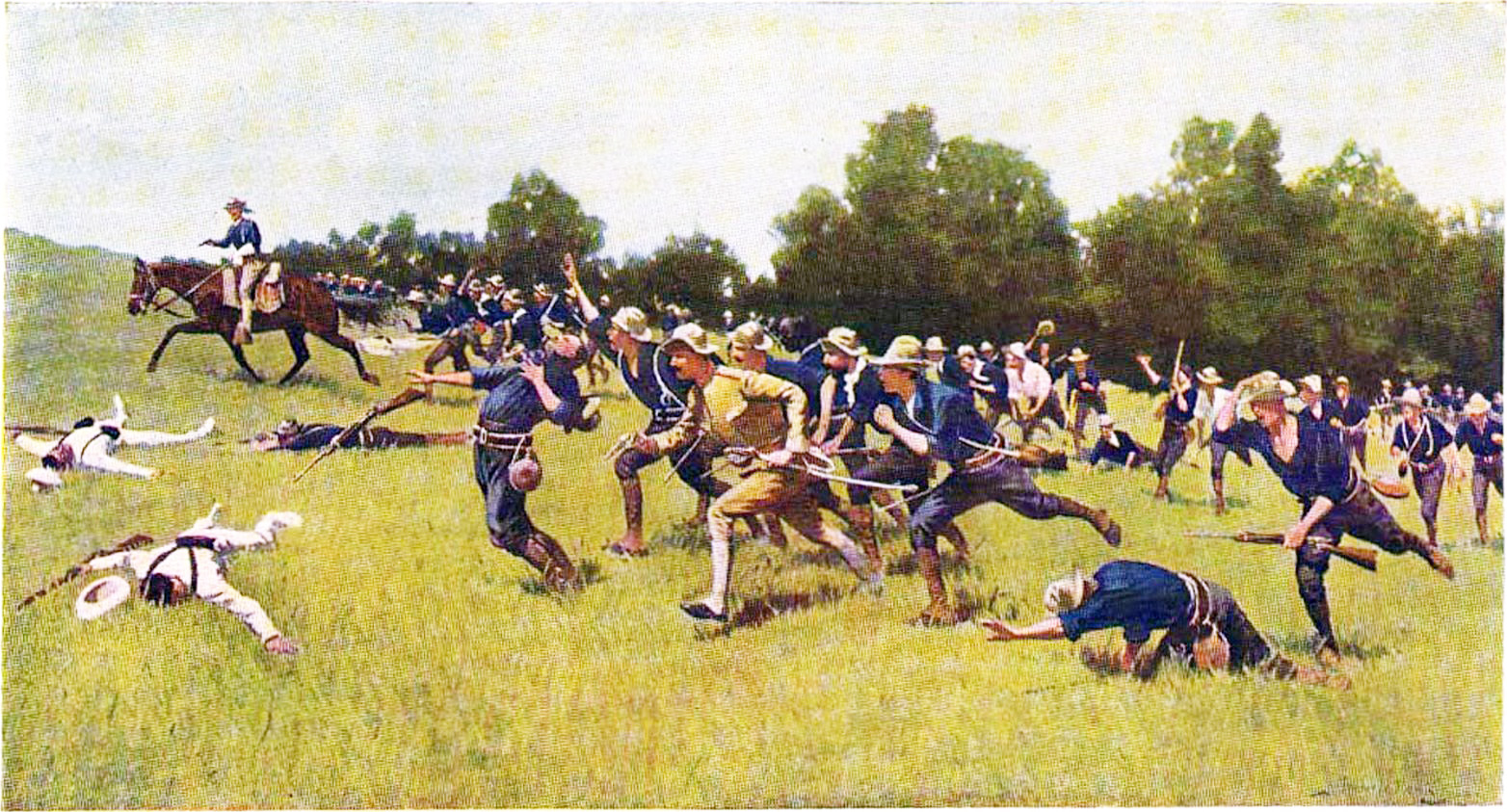
Wearing brown uniform in foreground and holding a pistol in his right hand, Lt. Kane is seen in Remington's famous painting of the Charge of the Rough Riders

When the Spanish–American War began, Kane enlisted in the First United States Volunteer Cavalry, better known as the "Rough Riders". William Tiffany, and Kane's sisters Louisa and Sybil, donated two M1895 Colt–Browning machine guns that cost $7,500 each.

When the Rough Riders were allowed to expand from their original number of 778 to 1000, Kane was commissioned a lieutenant. Kane was remarkable for always being immaculately dressed even during the worst conditions. Roosevelt mentioned him in his account The Rough Riders:

When I went down to the camp at San Antonio he was on kitchen duty, and was cooking and washing dishes for one of the New Mexican troops; and he was doing it so well that I had no further doubt as to how he would get on.

On July 1, 1898, in the assault on San Juan Hill by the Rough Riders, and while leading K Troop, Kane was wounded in the forearm and arm by Mauser rifle fire. For his wounds, he was awarded a citation for gallantry and was promoted to captain in the volunteer service. He served with distinction throughout the Cuban campaign. Kane is one of the Rough Riders featured in the foreground of Frederic Remington's famous painting of the charge on San Juan Hill.

Regular Army officer, San Juan Battle Gatling Gun Commander battery commander and renowned developer of their forward tactical use, John H. Parker, described Captain Woodbury Kane in his book, as follows:

Woodbury Kane – social leader, Fortune's favorite, aristocratic, refined, cultured, wealthy, haut ton de haut ton, and sabreur sans peur et sans reproche–how shall I paint him to you as I learned to know him in those dreadful, delightful seventeen days in which we lived only from instant to instant, and every man unconsciously bared his soul to his comrades because he could not help it?

A gentleman–he always looked that in the fullest sense of the word. Well groomed; in those days when our bed was a mud-puddle and our canopy the stars, when the music which lulled us to sleep was the hum of the Mauser bullets and the vicious popping of the Remingtons, when water to drink had to be brought at the peril of life for every mouthful, Kane turned up every morning clean-shaved and neatly groomed, shoes duly polished, neat khaki, fitting like a glove and brushed to perfection, nails polished, and hair parted as nicely as if he were dressed by his valet in his New York apartments. How did he do it? We never knew. He kept no servant; he took his regular turn in the ditches, in the mud, or torrid sun, or smothering rain. No night alarm came that did not find Kane first to spring to the trench–and yet he did it, somehow. The courteous phrases of politest speech fell ever from his ready lips, as easily as they would have done in the boudoir of any belle in the metropolis. The shrieking of a shell or tingling hiss of a sharpshooter's close-aimed bullet never came so near as to interrupt whatever polished expression of thanks, regret, or comment he might be uttering. And it was the real thing, too. The gentle heart was there. No man was readier to bind a wound or aid a sun-struck soldier in the ranks; none more ready to deny himself a comfort or a luxury to help a more needy comrade. A braver man, a surer or more reliable officer, never trod in shoe-leather. A grand example to our pessimistic, socialistic friends and cheap demagogues of the sterling worth and noble, chivalric character of a "society man of wealth." He is a living type of "Bel a faire peur," without the idiotic sentimentality of that maudlin hero, and with all his other characteristics...

(Kane and others) are the type of our young manhood - our representative American youth - As Roosevelt is of its vigorous manhood. They are the salt of the earth, and Kane - is both salt and spice.

== Post-war life and marriage ==
Upon returning to the United States, Captain Kane became a veteran companion of the New York Commandery of the Military Order of Foreign Wars. Returning to New York City after his war service, Kane lived at 23 West 47th Street. On March 28, 1905, Kane was married Sallie Hargous Elliot, the divorced former wife of Duncan Elliott, in Aiken, South Carolina.

Hunting Club historian, Judith Tabler wrote in her book on a Fox Hunt club to which Kane and fellow rough riders William Tiffany were members:

After the short war, the U.S. government provided no financial assistance for the muster out Rough Riders. Some had lost their jobs, others were sick, and there were dependents of the deceased. Woodbury Kane, Stanley and Richard Mortimer and Belmont Tiffany gave a large sum of money to Roosevelt for those in need. Roosevelt persuaded anyone resisting the generosity by stating that the gift was part of a memorial for William Tiffany. When he returned home, Kane resumed his social life in Aiken, New York and Newport (Rhode Island) where he became a competitive yachtsman. A longtime bachelor, he surprised his friends with his marriage to the divorcee Sallie Hargous-Elliot, in March 1905.

Kane died on December 5, 1905, at his apartment at the Algonquin Hotel in New York City from paralysis of the heart after returning from duck hunting in South Carolina, after contracting a cold. Kane's funeral service was held at the Church of the Ascension at 10:00 am on December 8, 1905. He is buried at the Kane family plot at Newport, Rhode Island.

Captain Woodbury left behind no children, but he did have his favorite polo pony, Punch. Punch had been retired to a park near Hyde Park, New York, where Woodbury had frequently visited him. Punch died May 22, 1910, at the record-breaking age of forty-five. The death was noted on the front page of The New York Times, and many attended Punch's burial on A.T. Jones' farm.
