= Augustus Venables-Vernon, 6th Baron Vernon =

The Right Honourable The Lord Vernon
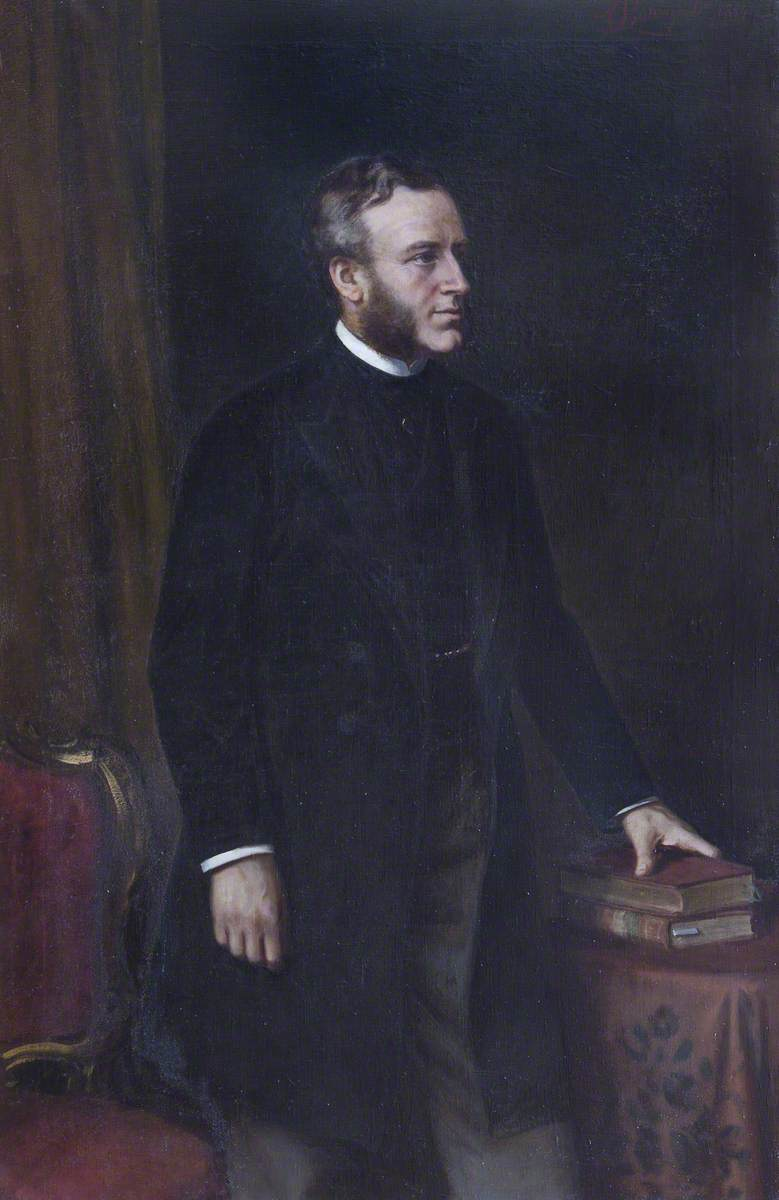
- Portrait of Lord Vernon, by Angiolino Romagnoli, 1884
- Born: Augustus Henry Venables-Vernon; 1 February 1829; Rome, Papal States (now Italy)
- Died: 1 May 1883 (aged 54); Mayfair, London, United Kingdom
- Education: Magdalene College, Cambridge
- Spouse: Lady Harriet Anson (m. 1851; died 1883)
- Children: 7
- Parent(s): George Venables-Vernon, 5th Baron Vernon; Isabella Caroline Ellison
- Relatives: Cuthbert Ellison (grandfather)

Augustus Henry Venables-Vernon, 6th Baron Vernon (1 February 1829 – 1 May 1883), was a British landowner and soldier.

== Early life ==
Venables-Vernon was born on 1 February 1829 at Rome, Italy where he was also baptized. He was the eldest son of George Venables-Vernon, 5th Baron Vernon, MP for Derbyshire (and the first for South Derbyshire), and Isabella Caroline Ellison (1805–1853). From his parents' marriage, his siblings were Hon. Caroline Maria Warren Venables-Vernon (wife of the Rev. Frederick Anson), Hon. Adelaide Louisa Warren Venables-Vernon (wife of Admiral Sir Reginald Macdonald), Hon. William Warren Vernon (who married Agnes Lucy Boileau, daughter of John Boileau, 1st Bt), and Hon. Louisa Warren Venables-Vernon (wife of the Rev. Thomas Parry Garnier). After his mother's death in 1853, his father married his cousin, Frances Maria Emma Boothby (only daughter of the Rev. Brooke Boothby, and Hon. Louisa Henrietta Venables-Vernon, a daughter of the 3rd Baron Vernon), in 1859. After his father's death, his stepmother married the Rev. Charles Martyn Reed, Rector of Hasfield, in 1881.

His father was the only son of George Venables-Vernon, 4th Baron Vernon of Sudbury, Derbyshire, and Frances Maria Warren (only daughter of Admiral Sir John Borlase Warren). His mother was the eldest daughter and co-heiress of Cuthbert Ellison of Hebburn Hall.

He was educated at Magdalene College, Cambridge.

== Career ==
He was a naval cadet aboard the HMS Illustrious, on the North American station from 1841 to 1844. He served as captain in the Scots Fusilier Guards from 1850 to 1851. Upon the death of his father on 31 May 1866, he succeeded as the 6th Lord Vernon, Baron of Kinderton.

Lord Vernon served as president of the Royal Agricultural Society, which promoted the scientific development of English agriculture. At the time of his death, the family estates consisted of 6,154 acres in Derbyshire, 2,578 acres in Cheshire (worth £10,983 a year), and 1,069 in Staffordshire for a total of 9,801 acres worth £24,473 a year. The principal family seats were Sudbury Hall in Derby and Poynton Hall near Stockport.

== Personal life ==
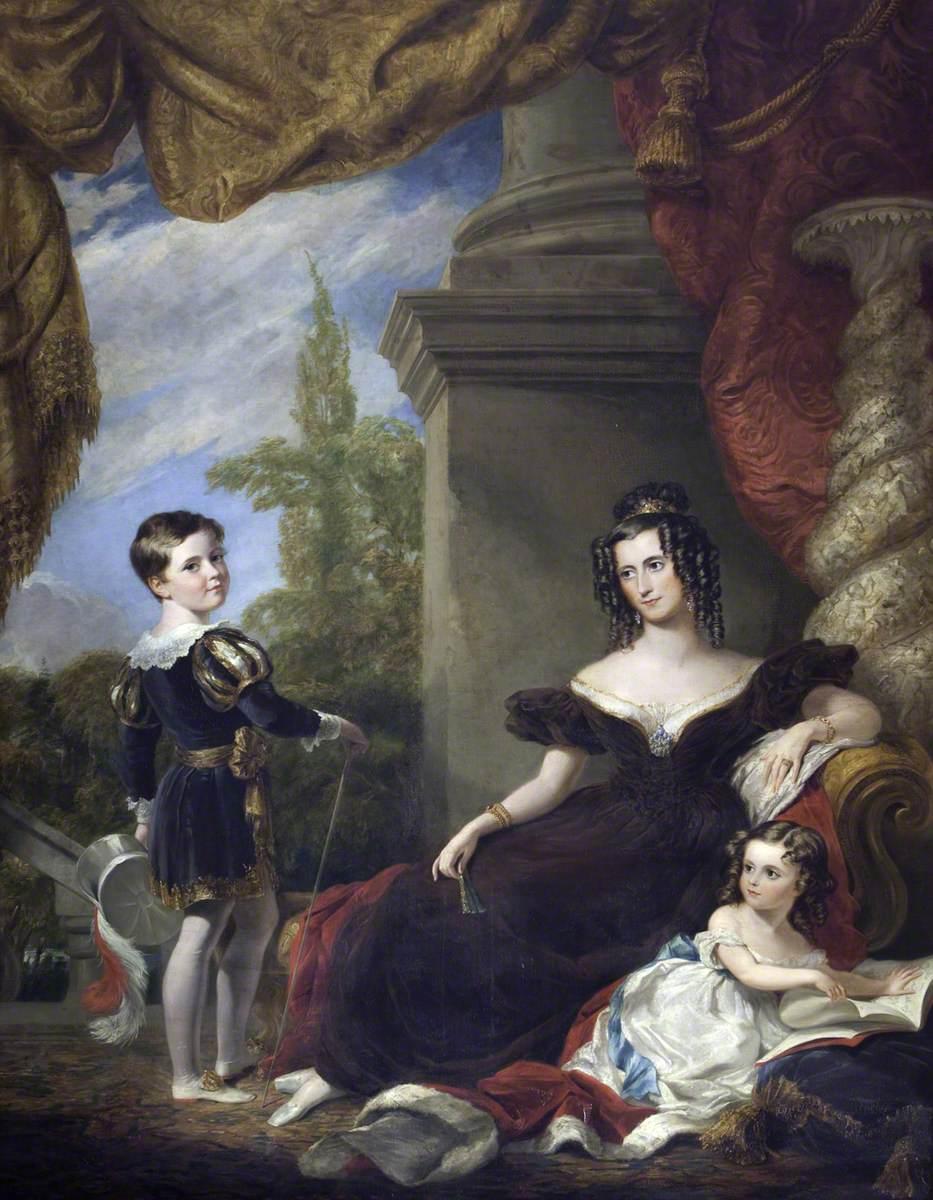
Portrait of his wife, Lady Harriet, as a child with her elder brother, Thomas, and their mother, Louisa Philips, Countess of Lichfield, by George Hayter, 1832

On 7 June 1851, Venables-Vernon married Lady Harriet Frances Maria Anson (1827–1898) at Westminster St James. Lady Harriet was the third daughter of Thomas Anson, 1st Earl of Lichfield, and the former Louisa Barbara Catherine Philips (youngest daughter of Nathaniel Philips of Slebech Hall, Haverfordwest). Together, they were the parents of two sons and five daughters, including:

- Hon. Diana Venables-Vernon (1852–1920), who married, as his third wife, Charles Edmund Newton of Mickleover Manor, eldest surviving son and heir of William Leaper Newton, in 1896.
- Hon. Mildred Venables-Vernon (1853–1915), who married Hon. Henry Augustus Stanhope, third son of Philip Stanhope, 5th Earl Stanhope, in 1878.
- George William Henry Venables-Vernon, 7th Baron Vernon (1854–1898), who married Frances Margaret Lawrance, a daughter of Francis C. Lawrance of New York City, in 1885.
- Hon. William Frederick Cuthbert Venables-Vernon (1856–1913), who married Louisa Frost, third daughter of Brig. Gen. Daniel M. Frost of the U.S. Army in 1884.
- Hon. Margaret Venables-Vernon (1865–1898), who married, as his first wife, the Rev. Frederick Tufnell, Vicar of Kilmersdon, Rector of Sudbury, third son of Edward Carleton Tufnell, in 1887.
- Hon. Alice Venables-Vernon (1868–1933), who married the Rev. Somerset Corry Lowry, in 1896.
- Hon. Adela Venables-Vernon (1870–1931), who married her second cousin, once removed, Rear-Admiral Algernon Horatio Anson, fourth son of Sir John Anson, 2nd Baronet, in 1896.

Lord Vernon died on 1 May 1883 at Brown's Hotel, 17 Dover Street in Mayfair, London, and was buried at Sudbury. He was succeeded in his titles and estates by his eldest son, George. His widow died on 15 February 1898.

=== Legacy ===
Lord Vernon had his portrait painted several times, including one in the collection of Stockport Heritage Services, and another by Angiolino Romagnoli, done in 1884 that today is displayed at Sudbury Hall.

Peerage of Great Britain
Preceded by George Venables-Vernon	Baron Vernon; 1866–1883	Succeeded by George Venables-Vernon
