= George Venables-Vernon =

George Venables-Vernon may refer to:

- George Venables-Vernon, 1st Baron Vernon (1709-1780)
- George Venables-Vernon, 2nd Baron Vernon (1735-1830)
- George Venables-Vernon, 4th Baron Vernon (1779–1835), Baron Vernon
- George Venables-Vernon, 5th Baron Vernon (1803–1866)
- George Venables-Vernon, 7th Baron Vernon (1854–1898)
- George Venables-Vernon, 8th Baron Vernon (1888–1915), Baron Vernon

== See also ==
- George Vernon (disambiguation)
- George Venables, Welsh journalist and barrister
