= Francis Venables-Vernon, 9th Baron Vernon =

British soldier (1889–1963)

Commander The Right Honourable The Lord Vernon DL
- Born: Francis Lawrance William Venables-Vernon; 6 November 1889
- Died: 18 March 1963 (aged 73); Sudbury Hall, Sudbury, Derbyshire
- Education: Eton College
- Alma mater: Christ Church, Oxford
- Spouse: Violet Miriam Nightingale Clay (m. 1915)
- Children: Hon. Avice Marten; John Venables-Vernon, 10th Baron Vernon
- Parent(s): George Venables-Vernon, 7th Baron Vernon; Frances Margaret Lawrance

Commander Francis Lawrance William Venables-Vernon, 9th Baron Vernon DL (6 November 1889 – 18 March 1963), styled The Honourable Francis Venables-Vernon from 1889 to 1915, was a British soldier.

== Early life ==
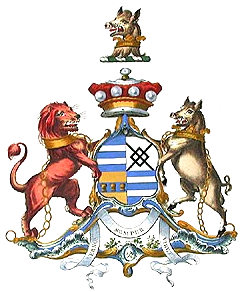
Baron Vernon coat of arms

Lord Vernon was born on 6 November 1889 into the prominent Vernon family. He was the son of George Venables-Vernon, 7th Baron Vernon, and Frances Margaret Lawrance (a daughter of Francis C. Lawrance, of New York City). His sister, Frances Lawrance Venables-Vernon, married Maurice Raoul-Duval and his elder brother, George Francis Augustus Venables-Vernon, 8th Baron Vernon, died in 1915 from illness contracted while on service in Gallipoli.

He was educated at Eton College before attending Christ Church, Oxford.

== Career ==
During World War I, he fought in the North Sea and Mediterranean, gaining the rank of Lieutenant-Commander in the Royal Navy. He retired from the Navy during March 1919 and was promoted to Commander on the retired list in 1929.

Upon the death of his elder brother on 10 November 1915, he succeeded as the 9th Baron Vernon, along with around 10,000 acres (4,000 ha) of land in Cheshire, Derbyshire and Staffordshire. He held the office of Deputy Lieutenant of Derbyshire.

== Personal life ==
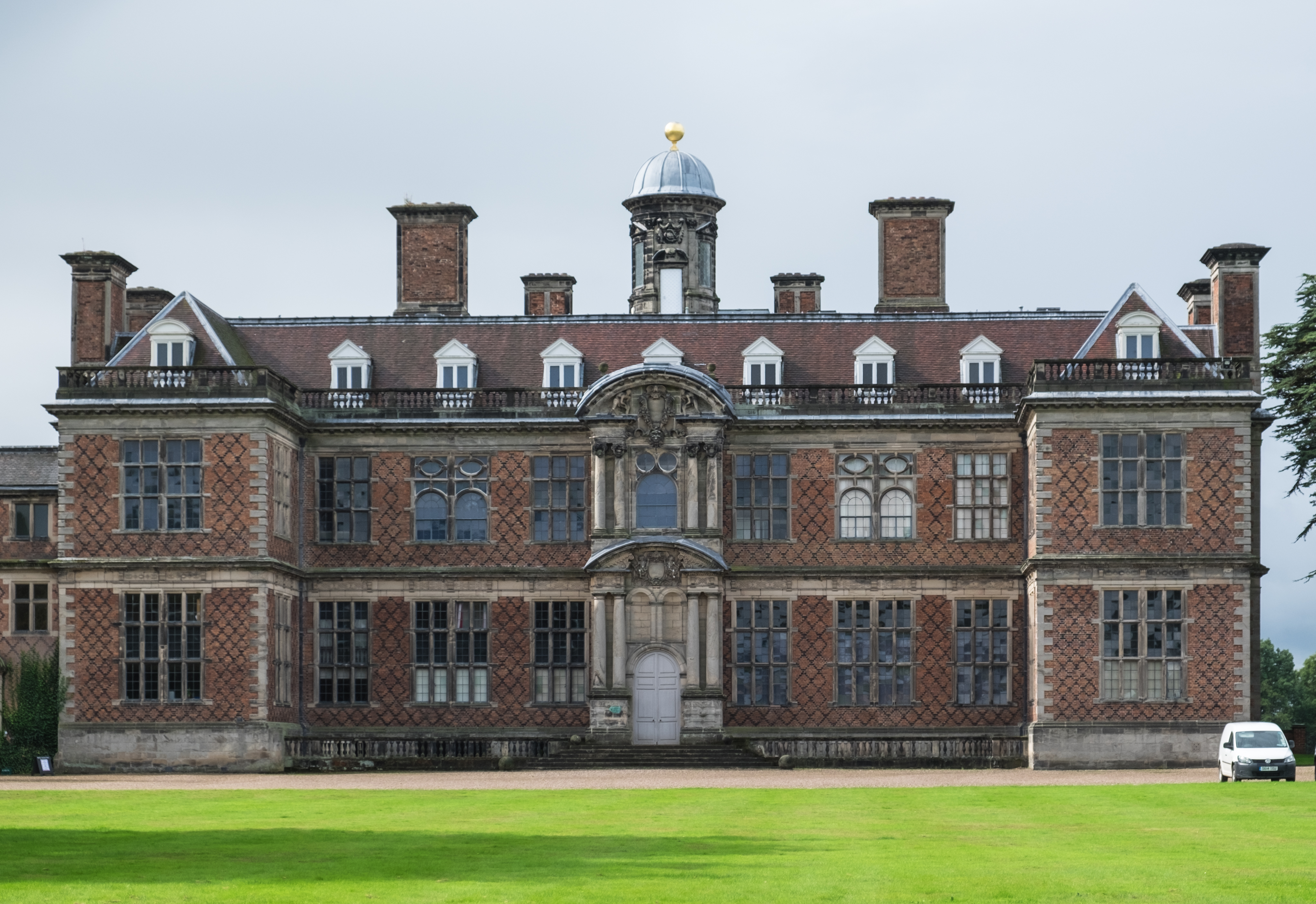
The north-east facade of Sudbury Hall

On 9 February 1915, he married Violet Miriam Nightingale Clay (c. 1895–1978), daughter of Col. Charles Herbert Clay of the Indian Army and Violet Harriet Nightingale (a daughter of Sir Henry Nightingale, 13th Baronet). Together, they were the parents of:

- Hon. Avice Irene Venables-Vernon (1919–1964), who married Lt.-Col. Francis William Marten, son of Vice-Admiral Sir Francis Arthur Marten, in 1940.
- John Lawrance Venables-Vernon, 10th Baron Vernon (1923–2000), who married Sheila Jean Clark, a daughter of William Marshall Clark, in 1955. They divorced in 1982 and he married Sally June Stratford, a daughter of Robin Stratford, in 1982.

Lord Vernon died at Sudbury Hall on 18 March 1963 at age 73. Four years after his death, his son John gifted the family seat, Sudbury Hall, to the National Trust in 1967.

=== Descendants ===
Through his daughter Avice, he was a grandfather of Michael Francis Marten, who married Lady Caroline St Clair-Erskine (only daughter of Anthony St Clair-Erskine, 6th Earl of Rosslyn) in 1991.

Peerage of Great Britain
Preceded by George Venables-Vernon	Baron Vernon; 1915–1963	Succeeded by John Venables-Vernon
