= Baron Vernon =

Barony in the Peerage of Great Britain

- Quarterly, 1st & 4th, Grand-quarterly, I and IV: Argent a fret sable, II and III: Or, on a fesse azure, three garbs of the field (both for Vernon); 2nd & 3rd: Azure, two bars argent (for Venables)
- Creation date: 12 May 1762
- Created by: King George III
- Peerage: Peerage of Great Britain
- First holder: George Venables-Vernon
- Present holder: Anthony Vernon-Harcourt, 11th Baron Vernon
- Heir apparent: Hon. Simon Vernon-Harcourt
- Remainder to: Heirs male of the first baron's body lawfully begotten
- Status: Extant
- Former seat: Sudbury Hall
- Motto: Ver non semper viret ("Vernon always flourishes")

Baron Vernon, of Kinderton in the County of Chester, is a title in the Peerage of Great Britain. It was created in 1762 for the former member of parliament George Venables-Vernon. He had previously represented Lichfield and Derby in the House of Commons. Born George Vernon, he was the son of Henry Vernon (see Vernon family), of Sudbury in Derbyshire, and Anne Pigott, daughter and heiress of Thomas Pigott by his wife Mary Venables, sister and heiress of Sir Peter Venables, Baron of Kinderton in Cheshire. In 1728, he assumed by Royal Licence the additional surname of Venables upon inheriting the Venables estate in Cheshire from his childless cousin Anne, widow of the 2nd Earl of Abingdon.

Lord Vernon was married three times. He married, thirdly, Martha Harcourt, granddaughter of Simon Harcourt, 1st Viscount Harcourt.

As a prominent son and forefather of the present title-holder, their second son was Edward Harcourt, Archbishop of York who succeeded to the Harcourt family estates on the death of his cousin the William Harcourt, 3rd Earl Harcourt and so assumed by Royal Licence the surname of Harcourt, with his children known as Vernon-Harcourt. Edward was George's third son. (Note: Edward Harcourt was the father of William Vernon Harcourt, the grandfather of Sir William Vernon Harcourt and the great-grandfather of the Lewis Harcourt, 1st Viscount Harcourt See: Viscount Harcourt)

Lord Vernon was succeeded by his son from his first marriage to the Hon. Mary Howard and the second Lord Vernon, as Hon. George Venables-Vernon before his accession sat as a member of parliament for Weobly, Bramber and Glamorganshire in turn and was appointed as a senior Liberal whip in the House of Lords.

His half-brother succeeded, the third Baron, the eldest son of Martha Harcourt. His son, the fourth Baron, married Frances Maria Warren, daughter of Admiral Sir John Borlase Warren, 1st Baronet. His son, the fifth Baron, represented Derbyshire and Derbyshire South in the House of Commons. He assumed in 1837 by sign manual the surname of Warren only for himself and subsequent issue, but this appears to have been repudiated by his son.

His grandson, the seventh Baron, served as Captain of the Yeomen of the Guard (Deputy Chief Whip in the House of Lords) in the last Liberal administration of William Ewart Gladstone. On the death in 2000 of his grandson, the tenth Baron, this line of the family failed. The late Baron was succeeded by his distant relative (his fifth cousin once removed), the eleventh and present holder of the title. He is the great-great-grandson of Admiral Frederick Edward Vernon-Harcourt, fourth son of Edward Harcourt, Archbishop of York.

The ancestral family seat of the Barons Vernon is Sudbury Hall, near Uttoxeter, Derbyshire, which was given to the National Trust in 1967 in lieu of death duties after the death of the 9th Baron Vernon. The family of the late 10th Baron still keeps a residence in the grounds of the Sudbury Hall estate.

None of the Lords Vernon are among the excepted hereditary peers and none have achieved any votes in by-elections.

For other branches of the family, see Vernon family.

== Barons Vernon (1762) ==
- George Venables-Vernon, 1st Baron Vernon (1707–1780)
- George Venables-Vernon, 2nd Baron Vernon (1735–1813)
- Henry Venables-Vernon, 3rd Baron Vernon (1747–1829)
- George Charles Venables-Vernon, 4th Baron Vernon (1779–1835)
- George John Venables-Vernon, 5th Baron Vernon (1803–1866)
- Augustus Venables-Vernon, 6th Baron Vernon (1829– 1 May 1883)
- George William Henry Venables-Vernon, 7th Baron Vernon (1854–1898)
- George Francis Augustus Venables-Vernon, 8th Baron Vernon (1888–1915)
- Francis Lawrance William Venables-Vernon, 9th Baron Vernon (1889–1963)
- John Lawrance Venables-Vernon, 10th Baron Vernon (1923–2000)
- Anthony William Vernon-Harcourt, 11th Baron Vernon (b. 1939)

The heir apparent is the present holder's son, Hon. Simon Anthony Vernon-Harcourt (b. 1969).
The heir apparent's heir presumptive is his younger brother, Hon. Edward William Vernon-Harcourt (b. 1973)
The heir apparent's heir presumptive's heir is his son Freddie Vernon-Harcourt (b. 2007)

== See also ==
- Vernon baronets
- Earl Harcourt
- Viscount Harcourt
