= Aston Heath =

Coordinates: 52.892°N 1.741°W

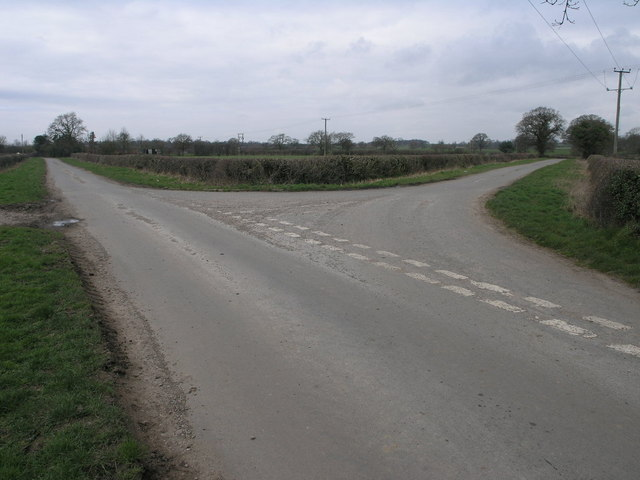
- Aston Heath.

- Location within Derbyshire
- OS grid reference: SK175327
- Civil parish: Sudbury
- District: Derbyshire Dales
- Shire county: Derbyshire
- Region: East Midlands
- Country: England
- Sovereign state: United Kingdom
- Post town: ASHBOURNE
- Postcode district: DE6
- Dialling code: 01283
- Police: Derbyshire
- Fire: Derbyshire
- Ambulance: East Midlands

Aston Heath is an area in Derbyshire, England. It is located 1 mile east of Sudbury, close to the A50 road. It takes its name from Aston, 1 mile southwest. Population details taken at the 2011 Census are included in the civil parish of Sudbury, Derbyshire.
