= Angiolino =

Angiolino is a given name and surname. Notable people with the name include:

== Given name ==
- Angiolino Gasparini (born 1951), Italian footballer
- Angiolino Romagnoli (1834–1896), Italian painter
- Angiolino Bonetta (1948–1963), Italian Venerable.

== Surname ==
- Andrea Angiolino (born 1966), game designer
