= George Venables-Vernon, 8th Baron Vernon =

British diplomat

Captain The Right Honourable The Lord Vernon
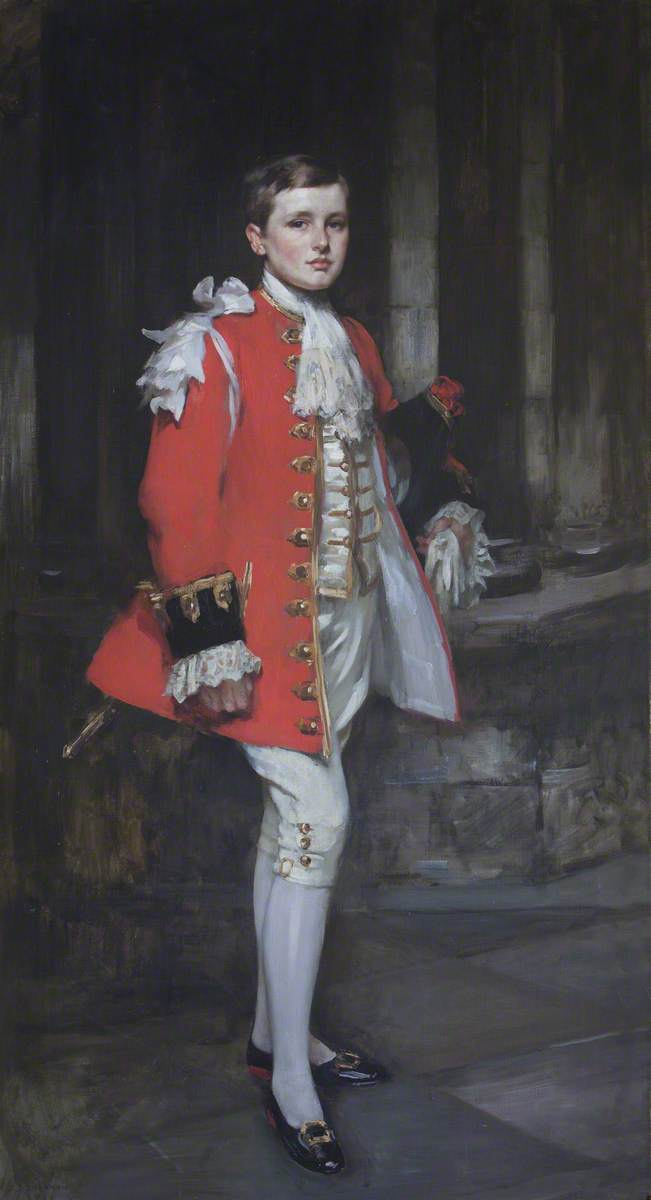
- Portrait of Lord Vernon, as a boy, by James Jebusa Shannon, 1903
- Born: George Francis Augustus Venables-Vernon; 28 September 1888; Sudbury Hall, Sudbury, Derbyshire
- Died: 10 November 1915 (aged 27); Malta
- Education: Eton College
- Alma mater: Christ Church, Oxford
- Parent(s): George Venables-Vernon, 7th Baron Vernon; Frances Margaret Lawrance
- Relatives: Francis Venables-Vernon, 9th Baron Vernon (brother)

Captain George Francis Augustus Venables-Vernon, 8th Baron Vernon (28 September 1888 – 10 November 1915), styled The Honourable George Venables-Vernon from 1888 to 1898, was a British soldier and diplomat.

== Early life ==
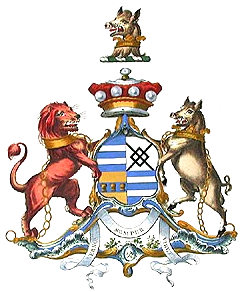
Baron Vernon coat of arms

Lord Vernon was born on 28 September 1888 into the prominent Vernon family. He was the eldest son of George Venables-Vernon, 7th Baron Vernon, and Frances Margaret Lawrance (a daughter of Francis C. Lawrance, of New York City). His sister, Frances Lawrance Venables-Vernon, married Maurice Raoul-Duval and his younger brother, Francis Venables-Vernon, was a British soldier.

Lord Vernon served as a Page at the Coronation of King Edward VII in 1902. He was educated at Eton College before attending Christ Church, Oxford.

== Career ==
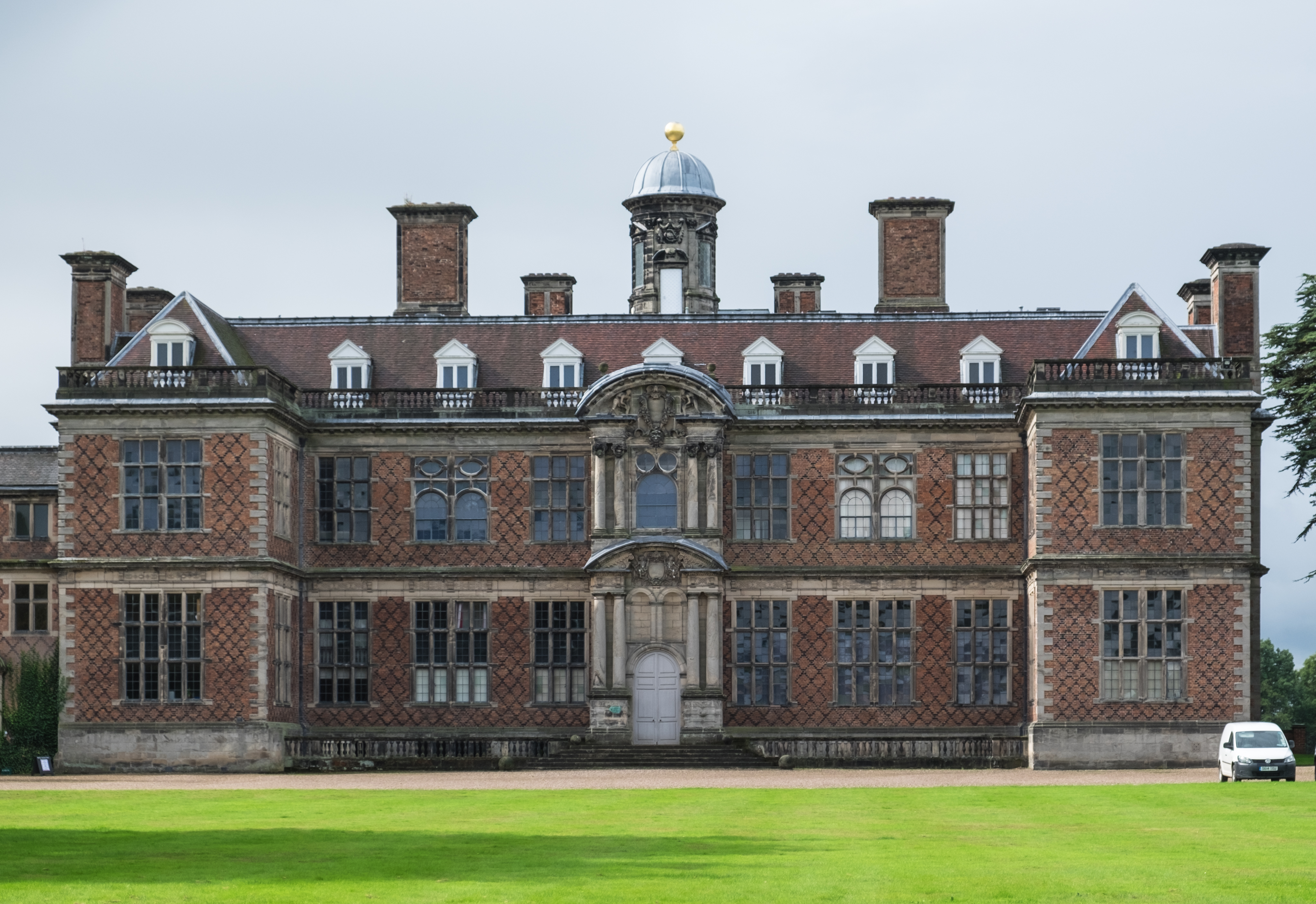
The north-east facade of Sudbury Hall

Lord Vernon was commissioned as a 2nd Lieutenant of the Derbyshire Yeomanry in 1906, a Lieutenant in 1912 and Captain 1914. He entered the Diplomatic Service, being Honorary Attaché at Constantinople in 1908 and in Munich in 1909 until the outbreak of the War. He served in World War I from 1914 until his death in 1915, when he contracted dysentery whilst on active service in Gallipoli.

== Personal life ==
Lord Vernon died at Malta on 10 November 1915 from dysentery contracted while on service in Gallipoli. He was succeeded in the barony, along with around 10,000 acres (4,000 ha) of land in Cheshire, Derbyshire and Staffordshire, by his younger brother Francis.

Peerage of Great Britain
Preceded by George Venables-Vernon	Baron Vernon; 1898–1915	Succeeded by Francis Venables-Vernon
