= Charles Lawrance =

American aeronautical engineer

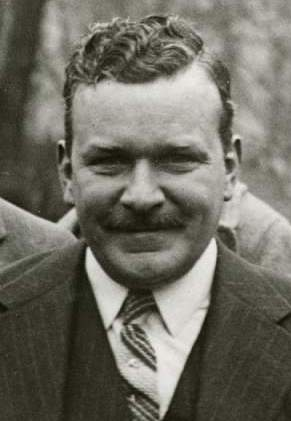
- Born: Charles Lanier Lawrance; September 30, 1882; Lenox, Massachusetts, U.S.
- Died: June 24, 1950 (aged 67); East Islip, New York, U.S.
- Resting place: Locust Valley Cemetery, Locust Valley, New York, U.S.
- Education: Yale University; École des Beaux-Arts
- Spouse: Emily Margaret Gordon Dix (m. 1910)
- Children: 3
- Parent(s): Francis C. Lawrance Jr. Sarah Eggleston Lanier
- Engineering career
- Projects: Lawrance J-1
- Significant advance: Air-cooled aircraft engine
- Awards: Collier Trophy 1927; Elliott Cresson Medal (1928)

Charles Lanier Lawrance (September 30, 1882 – June 24, 1950) was an American aeronautical engineer and an early proponent of air-cooled aircraft engines.

== Early life ==
Lawrance was born on September 30, 1882, in Lenox, Massachusetts, the son of Francis Cooper Lawrance Jr. (1858–1904) and his first wife, Sarah Eggleston Lanier (1862–1893). After his mother's death in 1893, his father remarried to Susan Ridgway Willing, a sister of Ava Lowle Willing (who married John Jacob Astor IV). They had a daughter, a half-sister to Lawrance, Frances Alice Willing Lawrance, who married Prince Andrzej Poniatowski (son of Prince André Poniatowski) in 1919. From his parents marriage, Lawrance had a younger sister, Kitty Lanier Lawrance, who was raised by their paternal grandfather, as their parents died when she was still young. In 1915, Kitty married W. Averell Harriman, the Governor of New York (they divorced in 1928).

Lawrance's maternal grandfather was banker Charles D. Lanier, a close friend of Pierpont Morgan. His great-grandfather was James F. D. Lanier, who founded Winslow, Lanier & Co. His paternal grandfather was Francis Cooper Lawrance, of Paris and Pau, France. In 1885, his paternal aunt, Frances Margaret Lawrance, married George Venables-Vernon, 7th Baron Vernon.

Lawrance attended the Groton School in Groton, Massachusetts, before Yale University, where he graduated in 1905, where he was a member of Wolf's Head.

== Career ==
Shortly after his graduation from Yale, he joined a new automobile firm that went bankrupt by the financial panic of 1907. He then went to Paris, where he studied architecture at the École des Beaux-Arts, experimenting with aeronautics at the Eiffel Laboratory.

=== Lawrance Aero Engine Company ===
Lawrance returned to the United States in 1914 and in 1917, he founded the Lawrance Aero Engine Company in 1917. He designed the Lawrance J-1 air-cooled aircraft engine, the direct ancestor of the extremely successful Wright Whirlwind series of engines. Long-distance flights of Admiral Byrd, Charles Lindbergh, Amelia Earhart and Clarence Chamberlin were all made possible by the Whirlwind series of engines, which could operate continuously for 33.5 hours. Despite sensational publicity that Lindbergh's flight attracted, Lawrance himself remained in relative obscurity. In discussion with Harry Bruno about his need for publicity to attract funds, he complained, "Who remembers Paul Revere's horse?"

Developed with US Navy funding in 1922, Lawrance's J-1 engine used aluminum cylinders with steel liners operated for 300 hours, when 50 hours endurance was normal. The Army and Navy urged the Wright Aeronautical Corporation to buy Lawrance's company, and subsequent engines were built under the Wright name. In May 1923, Lawrance's company was purchased by Wright Aeronautical, as the United States Navy was concerned that Lawrance couldn't produce enough engines for its needs. Lawrance was retained as a vice president. The radial engines gave confidence to Navy pilots performing long-range overwater flights. In 1925, after Wright's president, Frederick B. Rentschler, left the company to found Pratt & Whitney, Lawrance replaced him as company president.

=== 1927 Collier Trophy ===
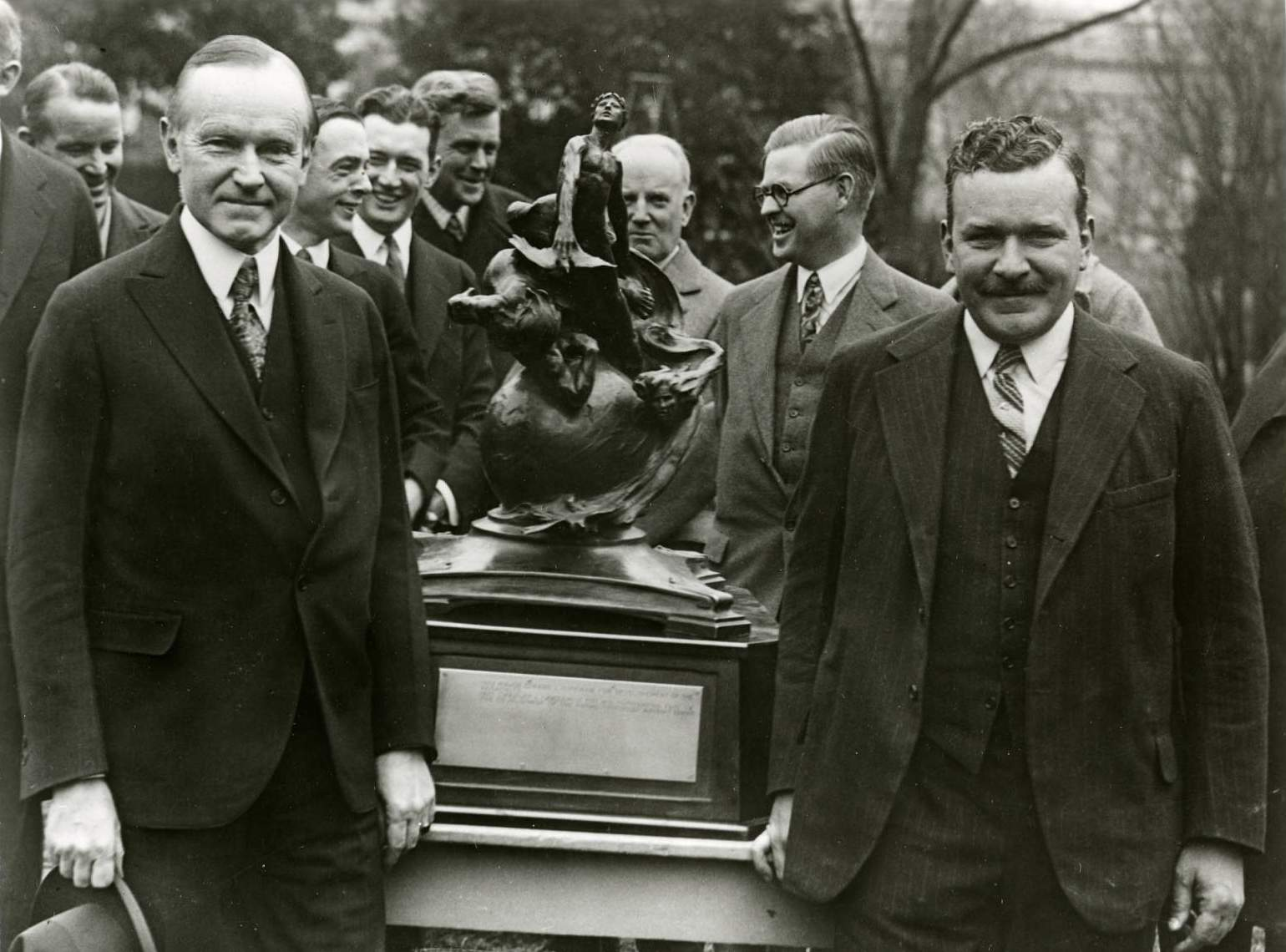
President Coolidge (left) congratulates Charles Lawrance on the air-cooled aircraft radial engine that won the 1927 Collier Trophy

President Calvin Coolidge congratulated Lawrance for his development of the air-cooled aircraft radial engine that won the 1927 Collier Trophy for the year's greatest achievement in American aviation.

In 1932, he wrote a book entitled Our National Aviation Program.

== Personal life ==
In 1910, he married Emily Margaret Gordon Dix (1885–1973), a daughter of Rev. Morgan Dix, the rector of Trinity Parish. They lived at 153 East 63rd Street, in the National Register of Historic Places listed Barbara Rutherford Hatch House, and together, their children were:

- Emily Lawrance (1911–2004), who married Joseph S. Frelinghuysen Jr. (1912-2005), the son of US Senator Joseph S. Frelinghuysen Sr.
- Margaret "Mardie" Lawrance (1913–2005), who was married to Drayton Cochran and later to Winston Frost
- Francis Cooper Lawrance (1916–2004), who graduated from Harvard in 1939, and who married Priscilla Howe. After her death in 1977, he married Anne Dunn.

Lawrance died at his Long Island home, Meadow Farm in East Islip, New York, on June 24, 1950. Charles is buried in Locust Valley Cemetery, Locust Valley, New York.
