= Francis C. Lawrance Jr. =

- Born: Francis Cooper Lawrance Jr. May 1, 1858; New York City, New York
- Died: March 18, 1904 (aged 45); Pau, France
- Education: Yale University; Columbia Law School
- Occupation: Lawyer
- Spouses: Sarah Eggleston Lanier (m. 1881; died 1893) Susan Ridgway Willing (m. 1894; died 1904)
- Children: Charles Lanier Lawrance; Kitty Harriman Pool; Princess André Poniatowski
- Relatives: Frances Venables-Vernon, Lady Vernon (sister); George Venables Vernon, 7th Baron Vernon (brother-in-law)

Francis Cooper Lawrance Jr. (May 1, 1858 – March 18, 1904) was an American lawyer and clubman who was prominent in New York society.

== Early life ==
Lawrance was born on May 1, 1858, in Manhattan. He was the eldest son, and namesake, of Francis Cooper Lawrance (1829–1911) and Frances Adelaide (née Garner) Lawrance (1835–1908). Among his siblings were Frances Margaret Lawrance (wife of George Venables Vernon, 7th Baron Vernon in 1885), Thomas Garner Lawrance (who died aged 21), and William Garner Lawrance.

His paternal grandparents were Thomas Lawrance and Margaret Lawrence (née Ireland) Lawrance. His maternal grandparents were Thomas Garner of England and Frances Mathilda (née Thorne) Garner.

Lawrance graduated from Yale University in 1877. He also studied at Columbia Law School where he received his Bachelor of Laws in 1880 and, afterwards, studied in Stuttgart, Germany.

== Career ==
Lawrance was a lawyer with an office at 27 Pine Street in New York City, although he never practiced law.

He was a member of the Metropolitan Club, the New York Yacht Club, the Union Club, the South Side Sportsmen's Club and the Yale Alumni Association.

== Personal life ==
In 1881, Lawrance was married to Sarah Eggleston Lanier (1862–1893), a daughter of banker Charles D. Lanier and granddaughter of James F. D. Lanier, who founded Winslow, Lanier & Co. Before her death in 1893, they were the parents of:

- Charles Lanier Lawrance (1882–1950), who married Emily Margaret Gordon Dix, a daughter of Rev. Morgan Dix, in 1910.
- Katherine "Kitty" Lanier Lawrance (1893–1936), who married W. Averell Harriman, the Governor of New York, in 1915. They divorced in 1928. After their divorce, he married Marie Norton Whitney, the former wife of Cornelius Vanderbilt Whitney, and she married Dr. Eugene H. Pool, President of the New York Academy of Medicine, in 1932.

In 1899, he married Susan Ridgway Willing (1865–1933) at Trinity Church in Newport, Rhode Island. Susan, the eldest child of Edward Shippen Willing and Alice Caroline (née Barton) Willing, was the sister of Ava Lowle Willing (who married John Jacob Astor IV). Before his death, they were the parents of one daughter:

- Frances Alice Willing Lawrance (1901–1989), who married Prince Andrzej Poniatowski, a son of Prince André Poniatowski, in 1919.

Lawrance died of Bright's disease on March 18, 1904, aged 45, at Pau, France. After his death, his widow moved to Paris with her daughter and her step-children were looked after by their paternal grandfather. Susan died in Paris on May 2, 1933, and was buried at the American Cathedral in Paris. In her will, she left her estate to their daughter and grandson. Their daughter received all of her jewelry, personal effects, a life estate in a trust of $250,000, a remainder interest in a $40,000 trust and the residuary estate.

=== Descendants ===
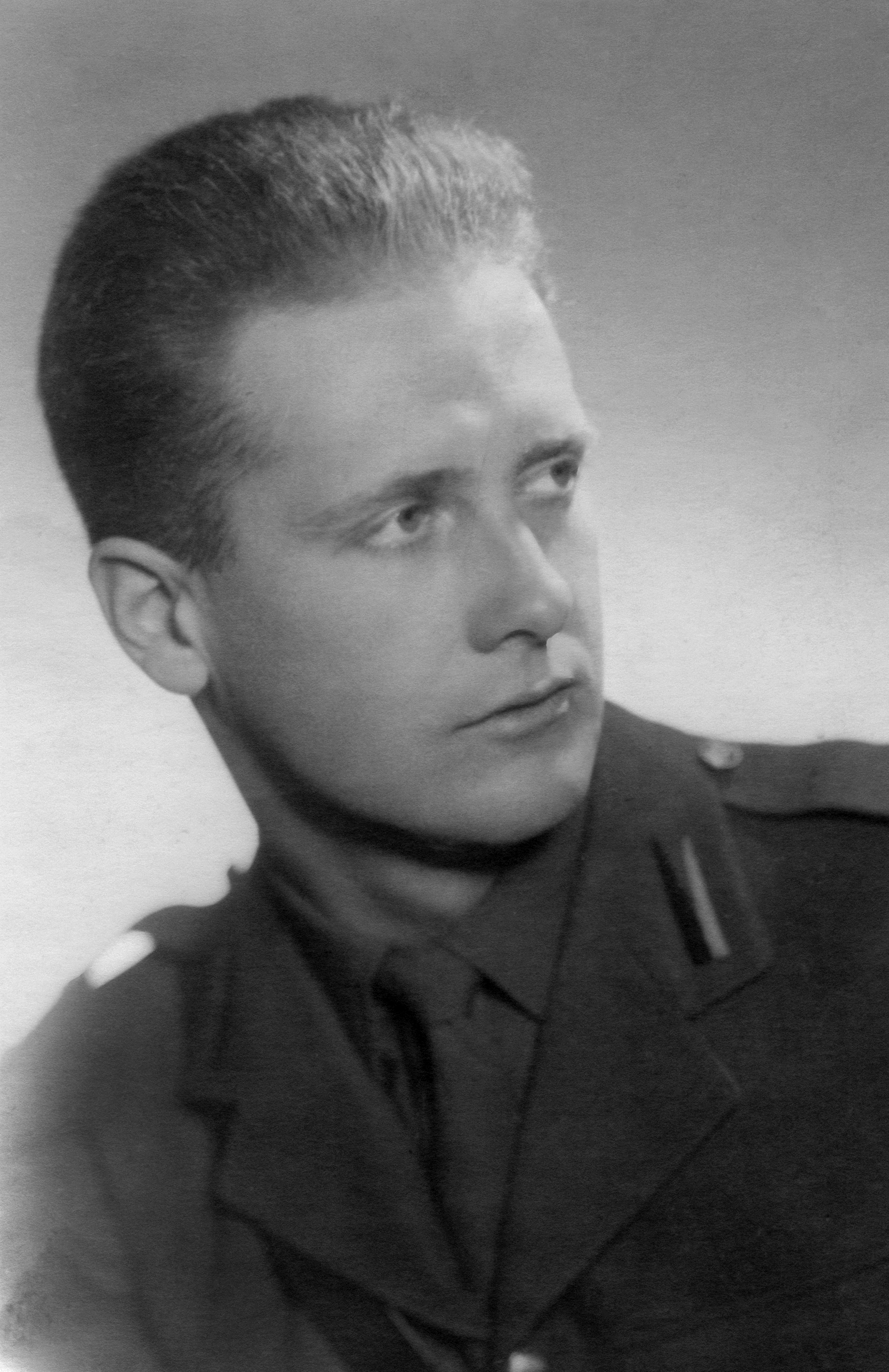
Lawrance's grandson, Prince Marie-André Poniatowski

Through his son Charles, he was the grandmother of Emily Lawrance (1911–2004), who married author Joseph S. Frelinghuysen Jr., and Francis Cooper Lawrance (1916–2004).

Through his youngest daughter Frances, he was the grandfather of Marie-André Poniatowski (1921–1945), a soldier who died during the World War II.
