= Joseph S. Frelinghuysen Jr. =

Joseph Sherman Frelinghuysen Jr.
- Born: August 11, 1912; East Hampton, New York
- Died: January 8, 2005 (aged 92); Morristown, New Jersey
- Education: Princeton University (1934)
- Occupation: Author
- Spouse: Emily Lawrance
- Parent: Joseph S. Frelinghuysen Sr.
- Awards: Silver Star

Joseph Sherman Frelinghuysen Jr. (August 11, 1912 – January 8, 2005) was the author of Passages to Freedom, about his escape from a prison camp in Italy during World War II.

== Early life ==
Frelinghuysen was born in East Hampton, New York, the son of Emily Brewster Frelinghuysen and Joseph Sherman Frelinghuysen Sr., a New Jersey state senator and later U.S. senator. In 1916, he was painted as a young boy, with his mother in a full-length portrait by the Swiss-born American artist Adolfo Müller-Ury, which was later donated to the Newark Museum in New Jersey. He graduated from Princeton University in 1934.

== Service and career ==
During World War II, he served as an artillery captain in the First Infantry Division in North Africa. Members of his family had served in the military since the Revolutionary War. On November 23, 1942, he was captured by German troops and taken to a prison camp in Italy. He and another American POW, Richard M. Rossbach, escaped on September 23, 1943, by crawling through the camp's wire fences. The British Eighth Army, which they had hoped to join, was stationed on the other side of the Apennines. Though the Germans briefly recaptured Rossbach, they both succeeded in rejoining the Allied forces.

After the war, Frelinghuysen worked in insurance and later managed the family dairy business in Somerville, New Jersey.

== Personal life ==
Frelinghuysen married Emily Lawrance (1911–2004), the daughter of Charles Lawrance (the son of Francis C. Lawrance Jr.) and Emily Margaret Gordon Dix (the daughter of Rev. Morgan Dix, rector of Trinity Parish). Together, they had:

- Barbara Frelinghuysen, who married Thomas C. Israel, chairman of Ingleside Investors
- Joseph S. Frelinghuysen III, Princeton class of '63 and president of J. S. Frelinghuysen & Company, a financial advisory and private investment concern in Mendham, N.J.
- Margaret Lawrance Frelinghuysen, who married Paul Alfred Kurzman in 1964. Kurzman is a great-grandson of Ida and Isidor Straus, who died aboard the Titanic in 1912. Mr. Straus was a U.S. Congressman and a co-owner of Macy's department store.
- Susan Emily Frelinghuysen, who married Robert Dudley van Roijen in 1981. van Roijen is the grandson of Jan Herman van Roijen, the Netherlands Minister to the United States from 1918 to 1933.

At the end of his life, Frelinghuysen was living in Far Hills, New Jersey, and died of pneumonia on January 8, 2005, in Morristown, New Jersey.

== Published work ==
- Keep Your Heart Running (1976) with Dr. Paul J. Kiell
- Passages to Freedom (1990)
