= Frances Venables-Vernon, Lady Vernon =

The Right Honourable The Lady Vernon
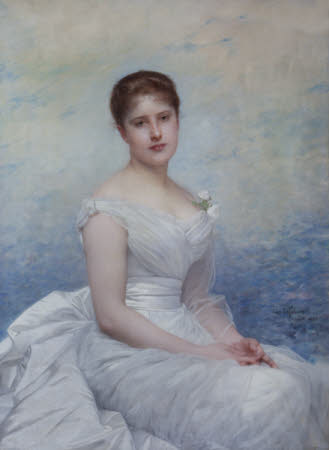
- Portrait of Miss Lawrance, by Jules Joseph Lefebvre, 1883
- Born: Frances Margaret Lawrance; 11 July 1861; New York City, New York, U.S.
- Died: 23 June 1940 (aged 78); Pau, France
- Spouse: George Venables-Vernon, 7th Baron Vernon (m. 1885; died 1898)
- Children: Hon. Frances de Kermaignant; George Venables-Vernon, 8th Baron Vernon; Francis Venables-Vernon, 9th Baron Vernon
- Relatives: Francis C. Lawrance Jr. (brother); Charles Lawrance (nephew)

Frances Margaret Venables-Vernon, Baroness Vernon (née Lawrance; 11 July 1861 – 23 June 1940) was an American heiress who married into the British aristocracy.

== Early life ==
She was the daughter of Francis Cooper Lawrance (1829–1911) and Frances Adelaide (née Garner) Lawrance (1835–1908), of New York City. Among her siblings were Francis C. Lawrance Jr. (son-in-law of banker Charles D. Lanier and brother-in-law of John Jacob Astor IV), Thomas Garner Lawrance (who died aged 21), and William Garner Lawrance.

Her paternal grandparents were Thomas Lawrance and Margaret Lawrence (née Ireland) Lawrance. Her maternal grandparents were Thomas Garner of England and Frances Mathilda (née Thorne) Garner. Among her nieces and nephews were Charles Lanier Lawrance, Kitty Lawrance (wife of W. Averell Harriman, the Governor of New York), and Frances Alice Willing Lawrance (wife of Prince Andrzej Poniatowski, a son of Prince André Poniatowski).

From her mother, she inherited two trusts which, as of 1922, aggregated to more than $300,000 and a third interest in a residuary estate, securities which cost $282,787 (when purchased), $33,520 in cash, and an $37,486 interest in real estate.

== Personal life ==
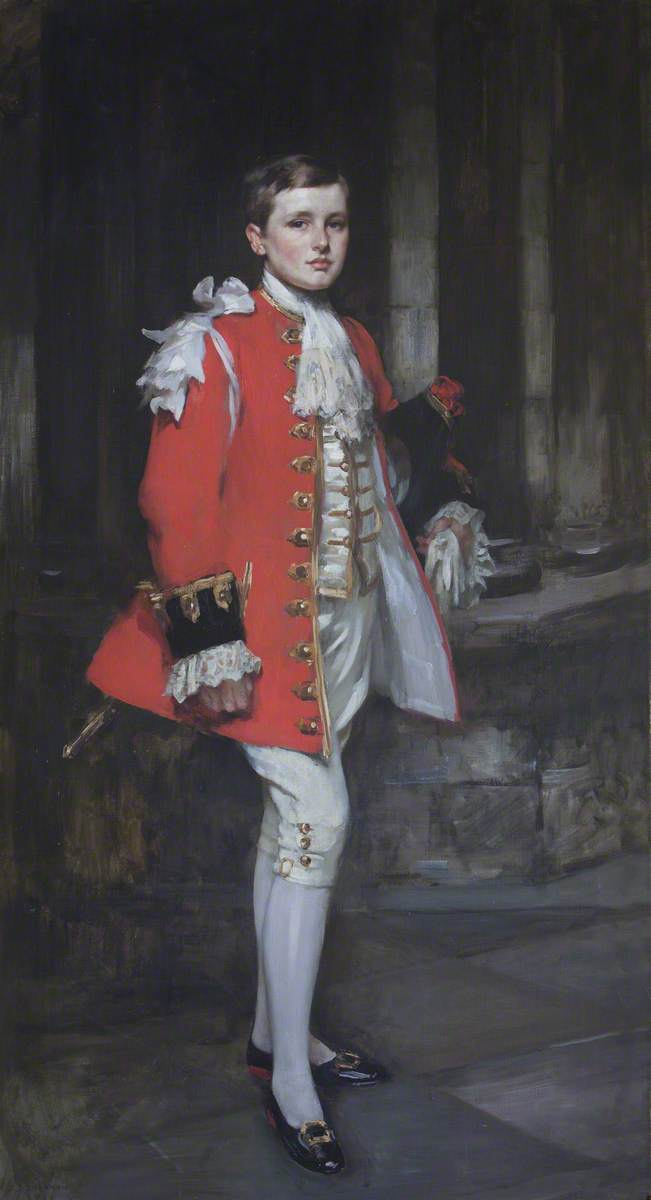
Portrait of her eldest son George, as a boy, by James Jebusa Shannon, 1903

On 14 July 1885, Frances married George Venables-Vernon, 7th Baron Vernon at St George's, Hanover Square in London. He was the son and heir of Augustus Venables-Vernon, 6th Baron Vernon, and his wife Lady Harriet Frances Maria Anson (a daughter of Thomas Anson, 1st Earl of Lichfield). Lord Vernon had succeeded his father in the barony in 1883, when he inherited around 10,000 acres (4,000 ha) of land in Cheshire, Derbyshire and Staffordshire. Together, they were the parents of:

- Hon. Frances Lawrance Venables-Vernon (b. 1886), who married Maurice Raoul-Duval of the Château de Marolles in 1910. After he was killed in action in 1916, she married Lt. Jean de Kermaignant in 1918.
- George Francis Augustus Venables-Vernon, 8th Baron Vernon (1888–1915), who died, unmarried, from illness contracted while on service in Gallipoli.
- Francis Lawrance William Venables-Vernon, 9th Baron Vernon (1889–1963), who married Violet Miriam Nightingale Clay, daughter of Col. Charles Herbert Clay and Violet Harriet Nightingale (a daughter of Sir Henry Nightingale, 13th Baronet), in 1915.

Lord Vernon died in December 1898, aged 44, and was succeeded in the barony by their eldest son, George. Lady Vernon, was declared incompetent in 1910 and spent the rest of her life living in Pau, France, where she died on 23 June 1940.

=== Legacy ===
In 1883, Frances had her portrait painted by Jules Joseph Lefebvre. The portrait was transferred to the National Trust through the National Land Fund in 1967 when her grandson, John Lawrance Venables-Vernon, 10th Baron Vernon, gifted the Vernon family seat, Sudbury Hall to the National Trust.
