= George Vernon =

George Vernon may refer to:

- George Vernon (cricketer) (1856–1902), English cricketer
- George Vernon (MP for Derby and Derbyshire) (c. 1503–1565), member of parliament (MP) for Derby and Derbyshire
- George Vernon (MP for Bridgnorth) (1575–1639), MP for Bridgnorth
- George Vernon (MP, died 1692) (c. 1630–1692), MP for Haslemere
- George Vernon (Derby MP) (1635–1702), MP for Derby
- George Vernon (MP, died 1735) (1661–1735), MP for Haslemere
- George Vernon, member of the King's Men personnel 1617–30

== See also ==
- George Venables-Vernon (disambiguation)
