= Aston, Derbyshire Dales =

Hamlet in Derbyshire, England

Coordinates: 52.885°N 1.747°W

Aston
- Location within Derbyshire
- OS grid reference: SK169319
- District: Derbyshire Dales
- Shire county: Derbyshire
- Region: East Midlands
- Country: England
- Sovereign state: United Kingdom
- Post town: ASHBOURNE
- Postcode district: DE6
- Police: Derbyshire
- Fire: Derbyshire
- Ambulance: East Midlands

Aston is a hamlet in the civil parish of Sudbury in the district of Derbyshire Dales, Derbyshire, England. It lies at the junction of the A50 and A515 roads.

Aston was mentioned in the Domesday Book as Estun.

Aston Bridge carries the A515 road across the River Dove to Staffordshire. It is a Grade II listed building.
