= Angiolino Romagnoli =

Italian painter

Angiolino or Angiolo Romagnoli (1834 – 1896) was an Italian painter, mainly of genre subjects. He was part of the Macchiaioli painters who convened at the Caffe Michelangiolo. He is known for his fresco decorations meant to imitate Renaissance tapestries.

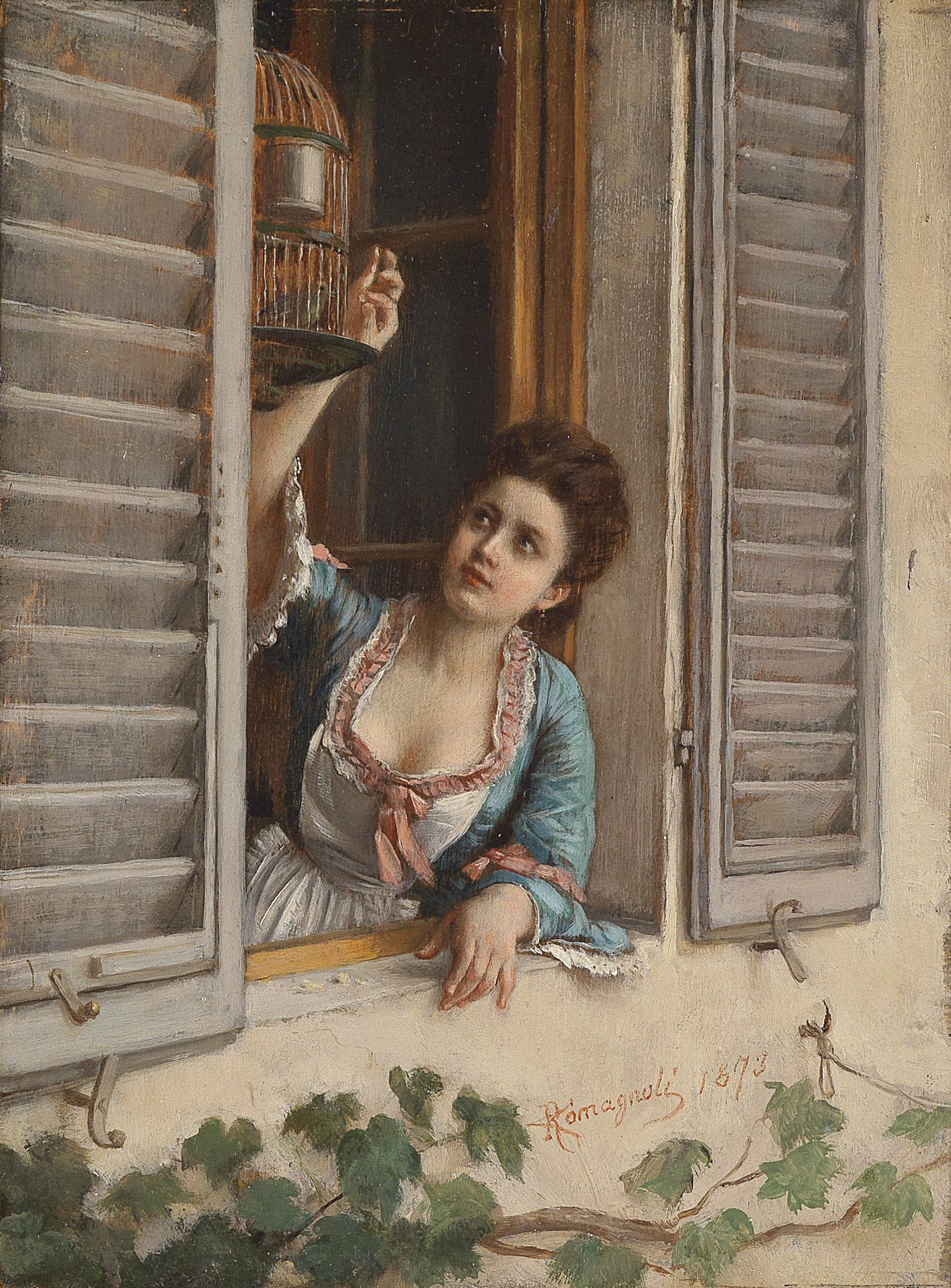
The little Darling

== Biography ==
He was born in Borgo San Lorenzo and later resided in Florence. With the help of Benedetto Servolini he was enrolled at the Academy of Fine Arts under Giuseppe Bezzuoli.

He exhibited Abbandono nell' Harem at the 1880 Exhibition of Turin. At Florence that year he displayed Ore a ozio, La mascherina, and Voluttà; and the following year Odalisca. This painting was also exhibited at the 1883 Florentine Exhibition. In 1884, he exhibited L' amante de'fiori, La Mariannina, and Ma come egli è!. For Turin, he painted additional domestic scenes: Mamma, vado alla scuola. In 1885 at Florence, he displayed Il giorno onomastico and Beppino sta'buono. He displayed Le gioie di famiglia, La massaia di casa, and La Curiositi at the 1886 Exposition. He displayed the works La balia, Head of study, La povera, and La pensierosa, which had previously been on display in Florence in 1883, in 1887.

He sketched a work of Storia di una cena fra Macchiaioli which depicts his contemporaries: Silvestro Lega, Giovanni Fattori, Telemaco Signorini, Niccolò Barabino, Enrico Pestellini, Massimiliano Guerri nicknamed "il brutto", Giovanni Muzzioli, Nino Costa, Igino Benvenuto Supino, Alfonso Hollaender, Emilio Lapi, and Evaristo Panducci. He painted portraits of Augustus Hare (1879, Hastings Museum and Art Gallery) and the aristocrat Augustus Henry Vernon (1884, National Trust, Sudbury Hall ). His Renaissance-style Visitation is part of the National Trust for Scotland.

Along with the painters, Pietro Alessio and Pio Chini, he painted the interiors of the Museum of the Manifattura Chini at Borgo San Lorenzo. He also frescoed the Teatro Giotto in Borgo San Lorenzo and painted the medallions depicting Giotto in the interior.

Angiolo Romagnoli died in Florence in 1896.
