= Enrico Pestellini =

Italian painter (1838–1916)

Enrico Pestellini (1838 – 1916) was an Italian painter, active in Florence, Tuscany.

== Biography ==
It is unclear where he trained, but he worked alongside the sculptor Odoardo Fantacchiotti. He was a friend of the Macchiaioli, and had a studio on via Panicale in Florence. He painted both portraits and intimate subjects. Including paintings titled La trecciaiuola. In 1880, at the Esposiziono Donatello of Florence, he exhibited a portrait. In 1886, he exhibited in Livorno a half-figure portrait, and other works, including an organ curtain (sipario) titled Regina angelorum, ora pro nobis. In 1887, in Venice he exhibited La sorella maggiore.
