= Morgan Dix =

American Episcopal priest, theologist, and author (1827–1908)

The Reverend Morgan Dix STD, D.D., DDC
- Rector of Trinity Church Wall Street
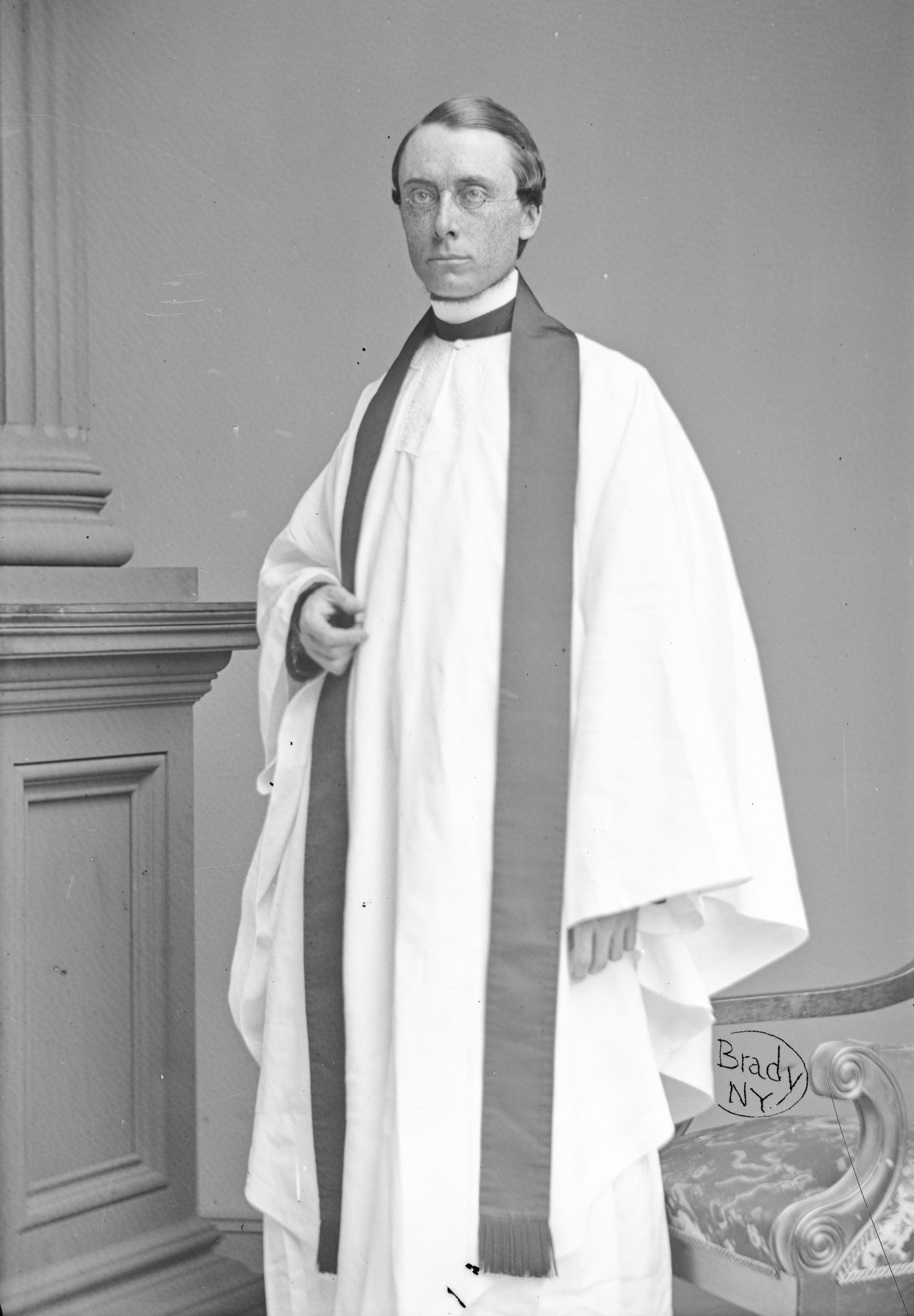
- Photo of Dix by Mathew Brady
- Church: Episcopal Church
- Province: Province 2 of the Episcopal Church
- Diocese: Episcopal Diocese of New York

Orders
- Ordination: May 22, 1853

Personal details
- Born: November 1, 1827 New York City, New York, U.S.
- Died: April 29, 1908 (aged 80) New York City, New York, U.S.
- Parents: John Adams Dix (father)
- Spouse: Emily Wolsey Soutter
- Education: Columbia College; General Theological Seminary

Sainthood
- Shrines: Trinity Church, New York

Morgan Dix (November 1, 1827 – April 29, 1908) was an American Episcopal Church priest, theologian, and religious author.

== Early life ==
Dix was born on November 1, 1827, in New York City. He was the son of Catherine Morgan, the adopted daughter of Congressman John J. Morgan, and Major General John Adams Dix, U.S. Senator from New York (from 1845 to 1849), Secretary of the Treasury (from January–March 1861), Governor of New York (from 1873 to 1874) and Union major general during the Civil War. His father was notable for arresting six members of the pro-Southern Maryland legislature, preventing that divided border state from seceding, and for arranging a system for prisoner exchange via the Dix–Hill Cartel, concluded in partnership with Confederate Major General Daniel Harvey Hill.

Dix was educated at Columbia College and the General Theological Seminary.

== Career ==
For almost fifty-three years, he was identified with Trinity Church, New York, of which he became assistant minister in 1855 and rector in 1862.

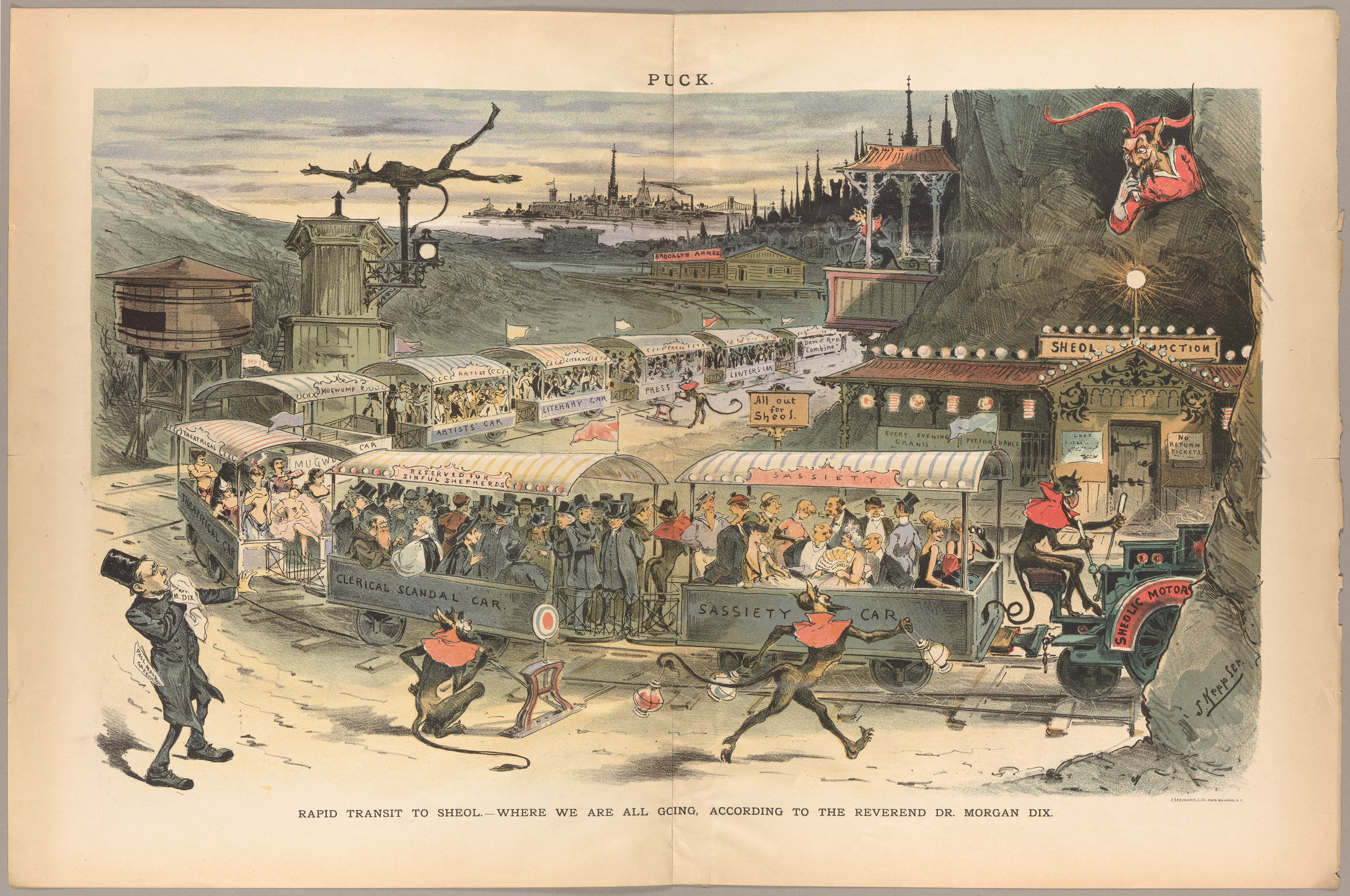
Rapid Transit to Sheol - Where We Are All Going According to the Reverend Dr. Morgan Dix 1888 satirical cartoon by Joseph Keppler in Puck magazine

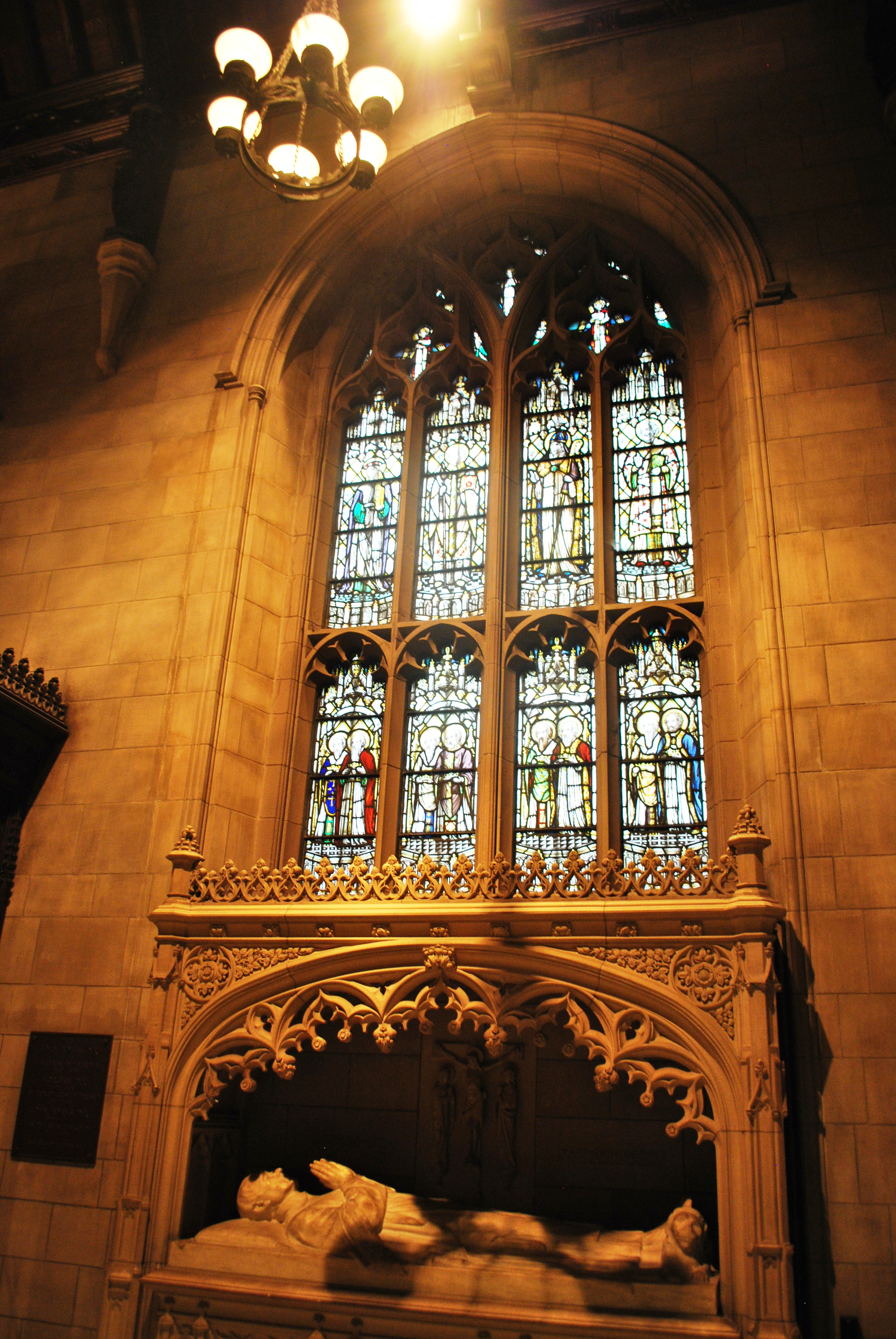
All Saints’ Chapel

As well as being a very active churchman, Dix also wrote widely about the practice of Christianity. Among his major works are Commentaries on Romans and on Galatians and Colossians; The Calling of a Christian Woman; The Seven Deadly Sins; The Sacramental System; and Lectures on the First Prayer-Book of Edward VI. Louis Harmon Peet.

He objected to the entrance of girls into universities, because it was not "proper for young women to be exposed to the gaze of young men, many of whom were less bent upon learning than upon amusement." He was an hereditary companion of the Military Order of the Loyal Legion of the United States.

In 1880, he was subject to a sinister hoax that stretched over several months and became the subject of much comment in the New York City newspapers of the time. The arrest of the hoaxer (who was subsequently given a prison sentence) ended the incident.

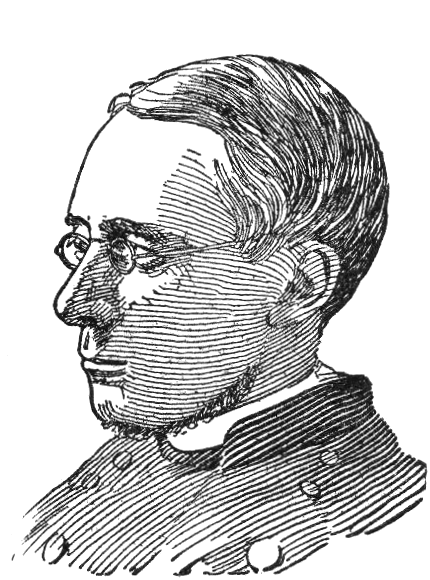
The New Student's Reference Work

== Personal life ==
On June 3, 1874 at the residence of the bride's mother, 22 West Seventeenth street, New York City, New York, Dix married Emily Wolsey Soutter. Her parents were James Taylor Soutter Sr. and Agnes Gordon Knox formerly of Virginia. Horatio Potter, Bishop of the Diocese officiated the ceremony.

Together they had the following children:

- John Adams Dix, a 1902 graduate of Harvard who married Sophie W. Townsend, the granddaughter of Howard Townsend and Justine Van Rensselaer
- Emily Margaret Gordon Dix, who married Charles Lanier Lawrance (1882–1950) in 1910
- Catherine Morgan Dix, who married William H. Wheelock

On the north side of the Trinity Church is the All Saints’ Chapel, added in 1913 in honor of Dix, Rector from 1862-1908. A cenotaph (or memorial) in the likeness of Dix is in the entry to the Chapel.

== Works ==
- The Holy Communion: a Sense of Unworthiness no Ground for Keeping back from It. (1859),
- May I Come to the Holy Communion? (1860),
- The Way of God in the Storm. (1861),
- An Exposition of the Epistle of Saint Paul to the Romans: According to the Analogy of the Catholic Faith. (1862),
- The Duty and Office of the Priest (1865),
- The Book of Hours: In which are Contained Offices for the Seven Canonical Hours, Litanies, and Other Devotions (1866),
- Lectures on the Two Estates; That of the Wedded in the Lord, and That of the Single for the Kingdom of Heaven's Sake. (1872),
- A Plea for Toleration. (1874),
- Lectures on the First Prayer Book of King Edward VI. (1881),
- Lectures on the Calling of a Christian Woman, and Her Training to Fulfil it, Delivered during the Season of Lent, (1883),
- The Sacramental System Considered as the Extension of the Incarnation (1893),
- Blessing and Ban from the Cross of Christ: Meditations on the Seven Words on the Cross (1894),
- Three Guardians of Supernatural Religion (1901),
- The Creed: A Full and Sufficient Statement of the Christian Faith. (1905).
