= Maurice Raoul-Duval =

French polo player

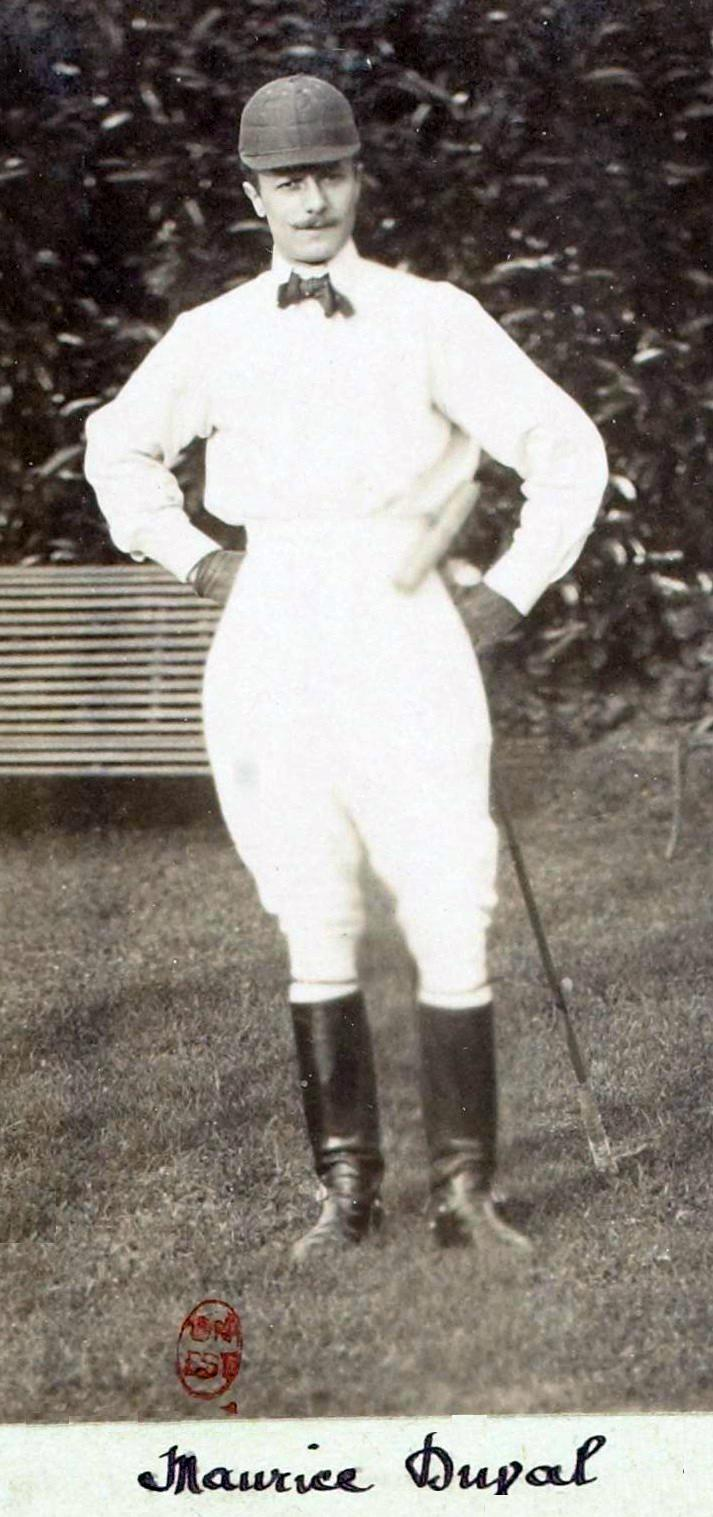
- Maurice Raoul-Duval en 1898 (polo)
- Born: 27 April 1866; Le Pecq, France
- Died: 5 May 1916 (aged 50); Verdun
- Spouse: Hon. Frances Venables-Vernon (after 1910)
- Children: Sonia Raoul-Duval
- Parent(s): Fernand Raoul-Duval; Henriette Dassier

Olympic medal record

Men's polo

Representing a Mixed team
Bronze medal – third place	1900 Paris	Team competition

Maurice Raoul-Duval (27 April 1866 – 5 May 1916) was a French polo player who competed in the 1900 Summer Olympics.

== Early life ==
Raoul-Duval was born on 27 April 27, 1866 in Le Pecq. He was the son of Fernand Raoul-Duval (1833–1892), a mining engineer, and Henriette Dassier (1840–1923). Together with his brothers, Réné and Charles, were among the early pioneers of polo in France, and helped to found the Paris Polo Club in 1892.

His paternal grandparents were Octavie Say (the daughter of the economist Jean-Baptiste Say) and Charles Raoul-Duval, a magistrate and senator, and his uncle was Edgar Raoul-Duval, the French magistrate and politician who was Representative of Seine-Inférieure. His maternal grandparents were Louise Labouchere and Auguste Dassier, founder of the Ador, Vernes & Dassier Bank in Paris.

== Career ==
In 1900 he was part of the Bagatelle Polo Club de Paris team which won the bronze medal. He was also a member of the Compiègne Polo Club team which was eliminated in the first round of the same tournament. In 1905, he was considered "the best player on the Continent" and was also well known on English grounds and was in the winning team of the Rugby Autumn Tournament in 1903 and 1904.

== Personal life ==
In 1910, he married Hon. Frances Lawrance Venables-Vernon (b. 1886), a daughter of George Venables-Vernon, 7th Baron Vernon and Frances Margaret Lawrance (a daughter of Francis C. Lawrance of New York City). After their marriage, they lived at the Château de Marolles. Before his death, they were the parents of:

- Sonia Raoul-Duval (1912–1997), who married Arnaud de Contades, Marquis de Contades (1907–1975), of the Château de Montgeoffroy. She later married the Marquis de la Rozière and lived in San Ángel, Mexico.

He was killed in action at Verdun during World War I. After his death, she married Lt. Jean de Kermaignant in 1918.

=== Descendants ===
Through his daughter Sonia, he was posthumously a grandfather of Arnold de Contades, Marquis de Contades (1933–2018), and Anne de Contades (b. 1936), who married Count Michel d'Ornano (the eldest son of Count Guillaume d'Ornano).

== See also ==
- List of Olympians killed in World War I
