= Sudbury Hall =

Historic house in Derbyshire, England

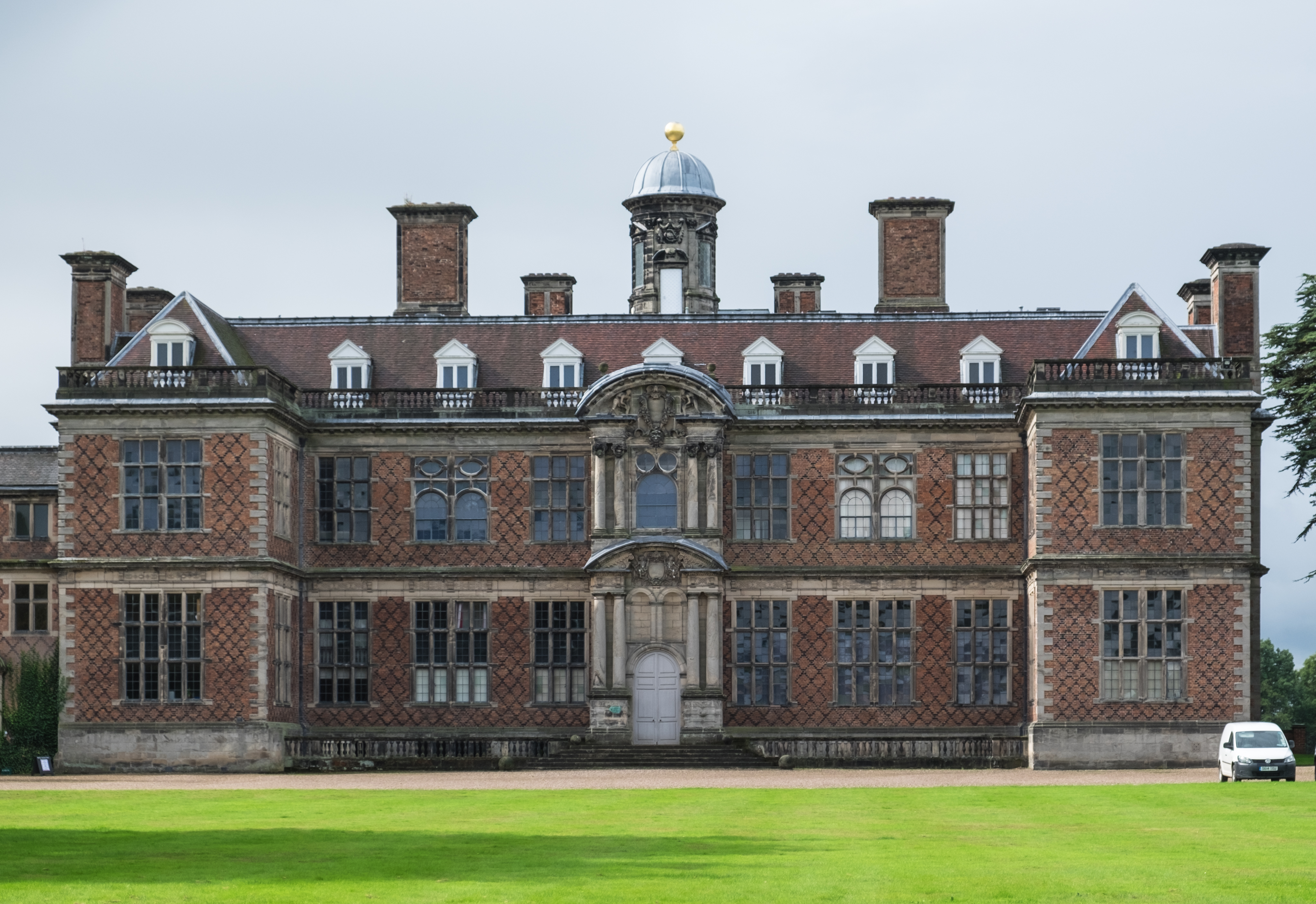
- The north-east façade of Sudbury Hall

- Location within Derbyshire

General information
- Status: open
- Type: English country house
- Architectural style: Restoration-era English Baroque, Jacobean
- Location: Sudbury, Derbyshire, United Kingdom
- Coordinates: 52.886338°N 1.765233°W
- Construction started: 1660
- Completed: 1680
- Renovated: 1969-1971

Renovating team
- Architect: John Beresford Fowler

Website
- nationaltrust.org.uk

Sudbury Hall is a country house in Sudbury, Derbyshire, England. One of the country's finest Restoration mansions, it has Grade I listed building status, and the garden is Grade II listed in Historic England's Register of Parks and Gardens.

The National Trust Museum of Childhood is housed in the 19th-century servants' wing of Sudbury Hall.

== History ==
In 1086, following the Norman Conquest, the manor of Sudbury was listed in the Domesday Book.

The Vernon family came to Sudbury as a result of the 16th-century marriage of the Sudbury heiress Ellen Montgomery to Sir John Vernon (d.1545), a son of Sir Henry Vernon of Haddon Hall in Derbyshire.

The present house at Sudbury was built shortly after the restoration of King Charles II, between 1660 and 1680 by George Vernon, grandfather of George Venables-Vernon, 1st Baron Vernon. George Vernon used his new-found wealth from marrying Northamptonshire heiress Margaret Onley to build a grand new mansion on the site of a smaller house. He kept meticulous accounts of the building project, and because there is no record of any payment to an architect, historians surmise that George designed Sudbury Hall himself. George Vernon also established the Estate village close to the Hall to provide housing for his servants, labourers and tradesmen. The buildings in the village still survive intact today.

Sudbury Hall was leased for three years from 1840 by Queen Adelaide, the widow of William IV. The east wing was added by George Devey in 1876–83. By the late 19th century, the extent of the Sudbury Estate stretched from Cubley down to Marchington in Staffordshire.

In 1916, George Venables-Vernon, 8th Baron Vernon, died aged 26 in Malta from an illness contracted while in service as an officer in World War I. As a result, the Sudbury estate was subject to Death duties, the taxation which had been introduced in 1894 by the Liberal Government. As with many other large estates across Britain, this increased financial burden compelled Francis Venables-Vernon, 9th Baron Vernon, to sell off tracts of land and some of the contents of Sudbury Hall. In the 1930s and 1940s, the 9th Lord was able to buy back some of this land to provide social housing in Sudbury village.

During World War II, a United States Army Air Forces hospital was based in Sudbury Park, close to RAF Sudbury. The land was purchased by the government in 1948 and converted into HM Prison Sudbury, with a housing estate for prison officers.

=== National Trust ===
Death duties continued to burden the Vernon family, and in 1967, Sudbury Hall and its principal contents along with part of the gardens and parkland, was transferred by John Venables-Vernon, 10th Baron Vernon via the National Land Fund to the National Trust, in part payment of death duties. The remainder of the Sudbury Estate is still held by Vernon descendants.

In 2020 Sudbury Hall closed to the public for renovations, during which the National Trust consulted 100 child "ambassadors" to redesign the visitor experience for children. It reopened in October 2022, rebranded as The Children’s Country House at Sudbury, equipped with a dressing up and dancing area, a mirror ball, a neon sign with the words "Party like it’s 1699", an escape room experience and humorous speech bubbles hung next to portraits. The revised visitor experience has been criticised by the Vernon Family; Joanna FitzAlan Howard, daughter of the 10th Baron Vernon accused the National Trust of "dumbing down" by turning her ancestral home into "a child-centred theme park". The National Trust have stated that the new experience offers "new ways for children to learn about the history of Sudbury Hall" and that the speech bubbles inform children about "hidden symbolism in historic portraits". The changes have also been criticised by the pressure group Restore Trust for discouraging adult visitors unaccompanied by children, and for removing the house contents to make way for "fun active games and activities". In May 2023 the Children’s Country House at Sudbury was awarded Permanent Exhibition of the Year at the Museum and Heritage Awards 2023. Judges expressed the view that the redesign of Sudbury Hall offered a "participatory and imaginative new bold approach to interpreting historic houses and heritage".

== Architecture ==
Sudbury Hall dates from the Restoration era, but George Vernon's building is based on a Jacobean design, with its ornate Great Staircase and Long Gallery. Notably, the state rooms are located on the west side of the building and the servants' quarters on the east side, a traditional layout preferred by Tudor architects. Architectural historian Cherry Ann Knott has suggested that the design of the hall was based on Crewe Hall in Cheshire, which stands around 1.5 miles from Haslington Hall, where George Vernon was born.

The house is a two-storey red brick building fronted with a Baroque main entrance porch, with two levels of paired columns, each surmounted with a pediment. The carvings above the porch were sculpted by William Wilson.

=== Interior ===
The interior of the house was completed in 1691. There have been a number of small alterations in the 18th and 19th centuries, and the interior was restored 1969-1971 by John Beresford Fowler. The Great Staircase, designed by Edward Pierce, dates from c.1676 and is considered to be one of the finest Restoration staircases in Britain. It is noted for its white-painted balustrade with luxuriant, carved foliage. The landing ceiling is adorned with ornate plasterwork by Robert Bradbury and James Pettifer (1675) and ceiling paintings of mythological scenes by Louis Laguerre. Other plasterwork within the house was designed by Pettifer, Bradbury and Samuel Mansfield of Derby. Of particular note in the drawing room is an ornately carved overmantel by Grinling Gibbons.

Between c.1872 and 1880, architect George Devey significantly modified and extended an early 19th-century servants' east wing to Sudbury Hall; this now houses the National Trust Museum of Childhood.

Architecture of Sudbury Hall

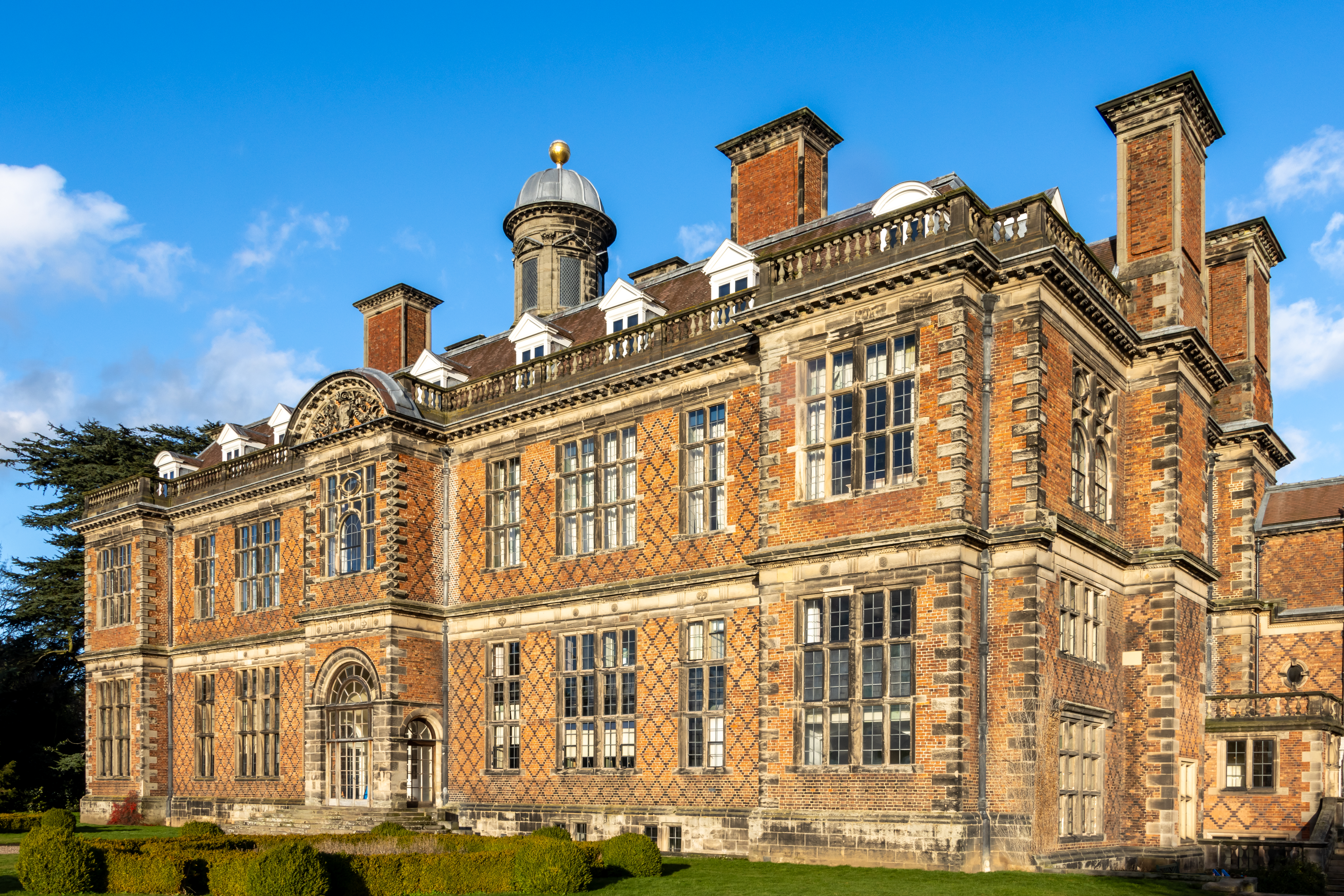
Rear of Sudbury Hall

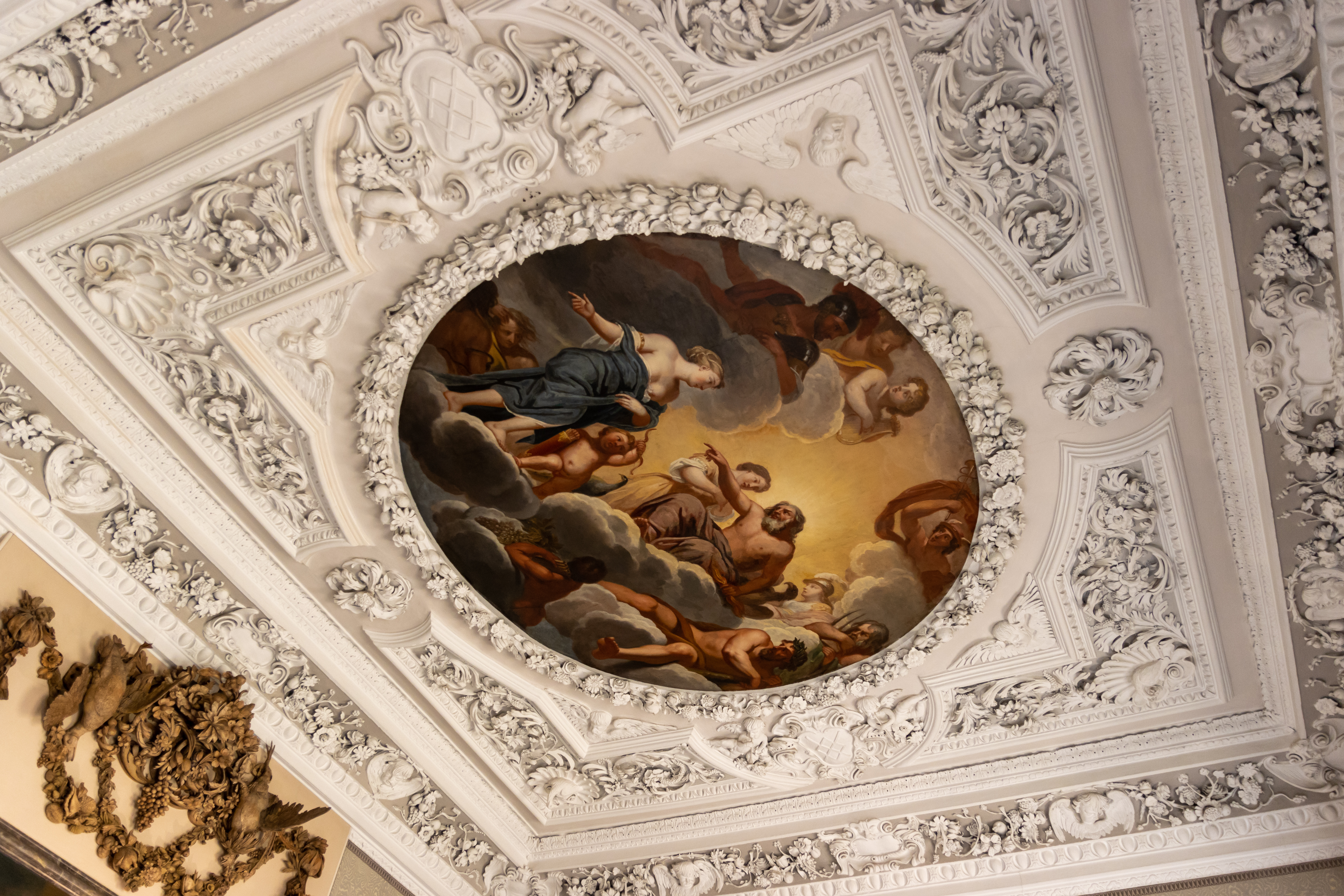
Plaster ceiling by James Pettifer (1675)

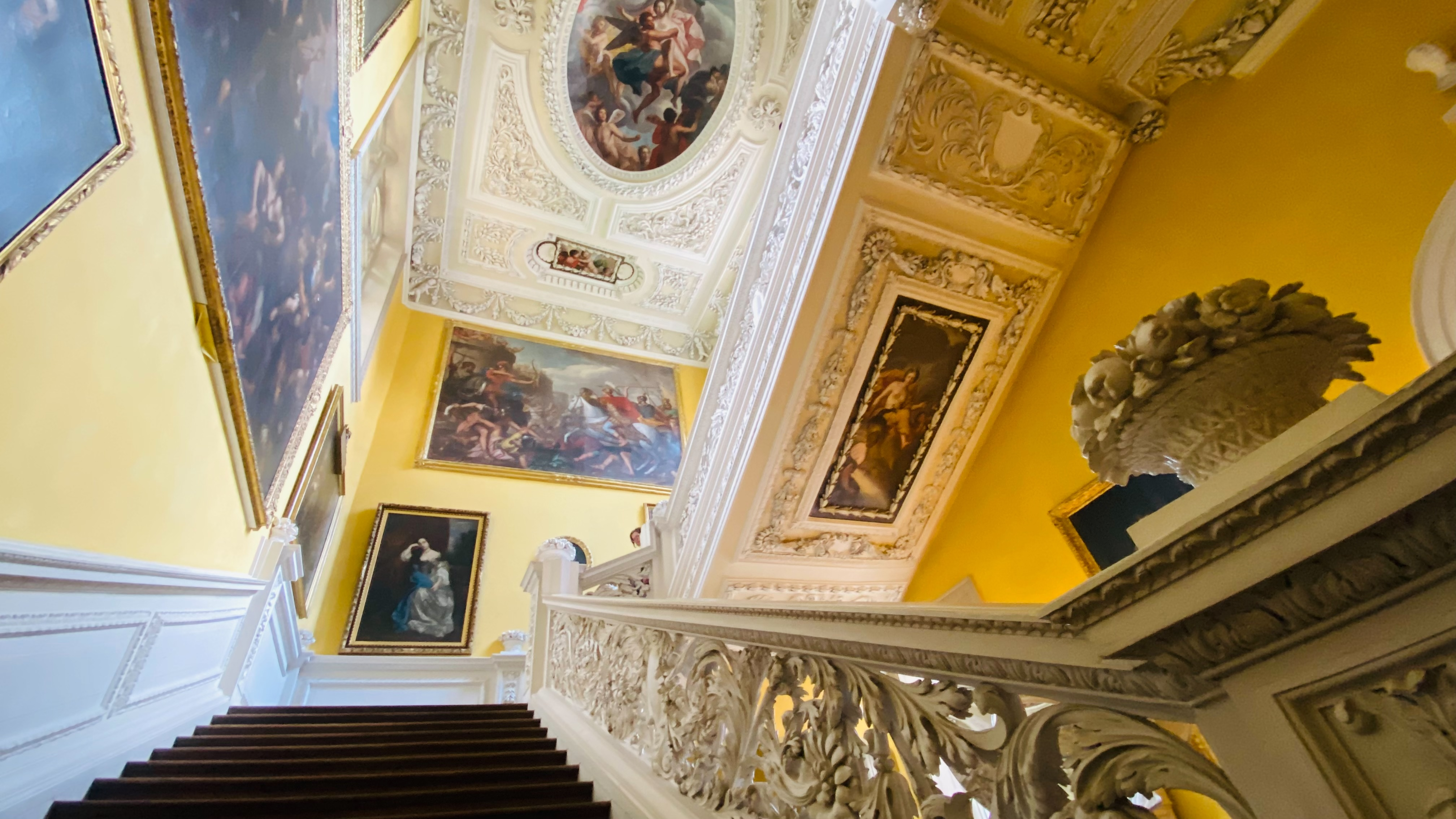
The Great Staircase by Edward Pierce (c.1676)

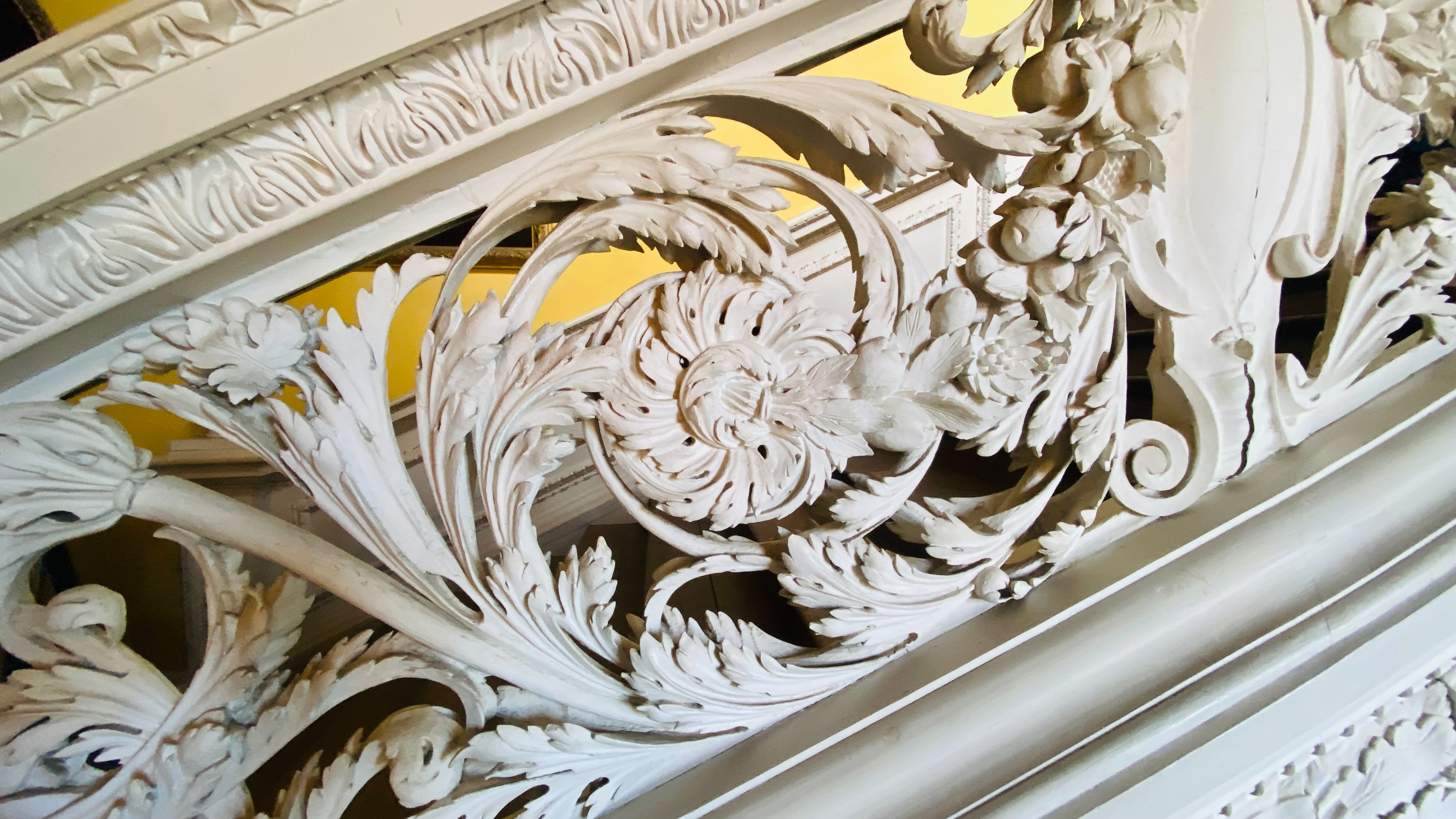
The Great Staircase balustrade (detail)

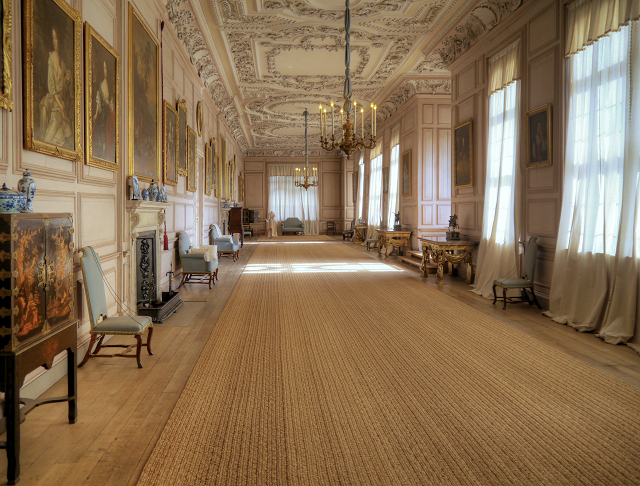
The Long Gallery

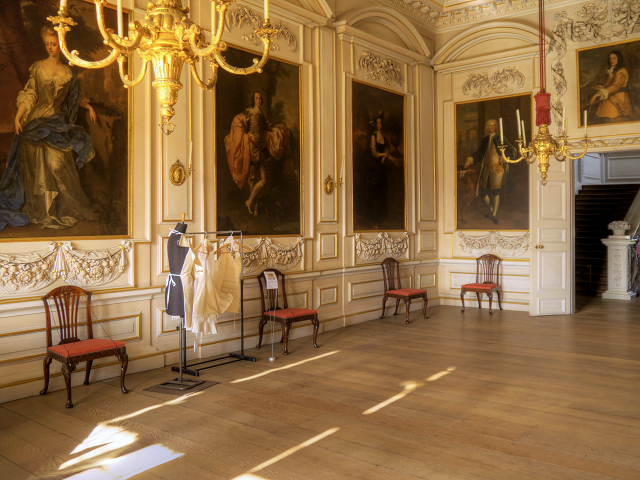
The Saloon

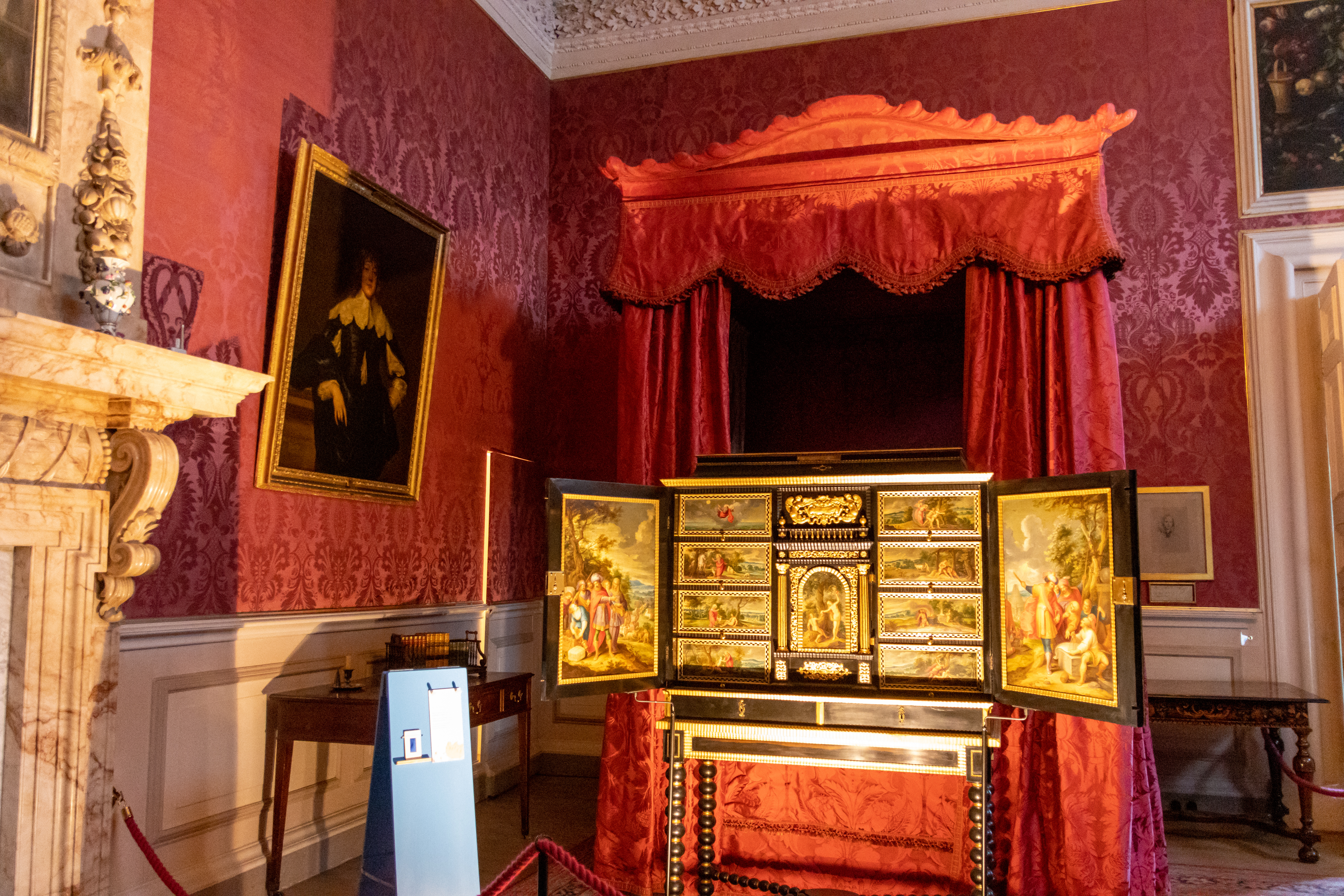
The bedroom

== Art collection ==
Sudbury holds a large collection of portraits of Vernon family members, as well as other paintings and works of fine art. Of particular note are a portrait of George Vernon (1635/6-1702), the builder of Sudbury Hall, by John Michael Wright, (oil on canvas, 1660). Other portraits in the collection include:

- Catherine Vernon (1663-1710), one of George Vernon's wives, by John Riley (oil on canvas, 1681);
- Edward Venables-Vernon-Harcourt, Archbishop of York, by Sir Thomas Lawrence (oil on canvas, 1823);
- Two mistresses of King Charles II: Nell Gwyn by Sir Peter Lely (oil on canvas c.1675); and Louise de Kérouaille, Duchess of Portsmouth, attributed to Sir Godfrey Kneller (oil on canvas 1670)
- A pair of portraits of King George III and Queen Charlotte of Mecklenburg-Strelitz from the studio of Sir Joshua Reynolds (oil on canvas, 1779).
Art treasures of Sudbury Hall

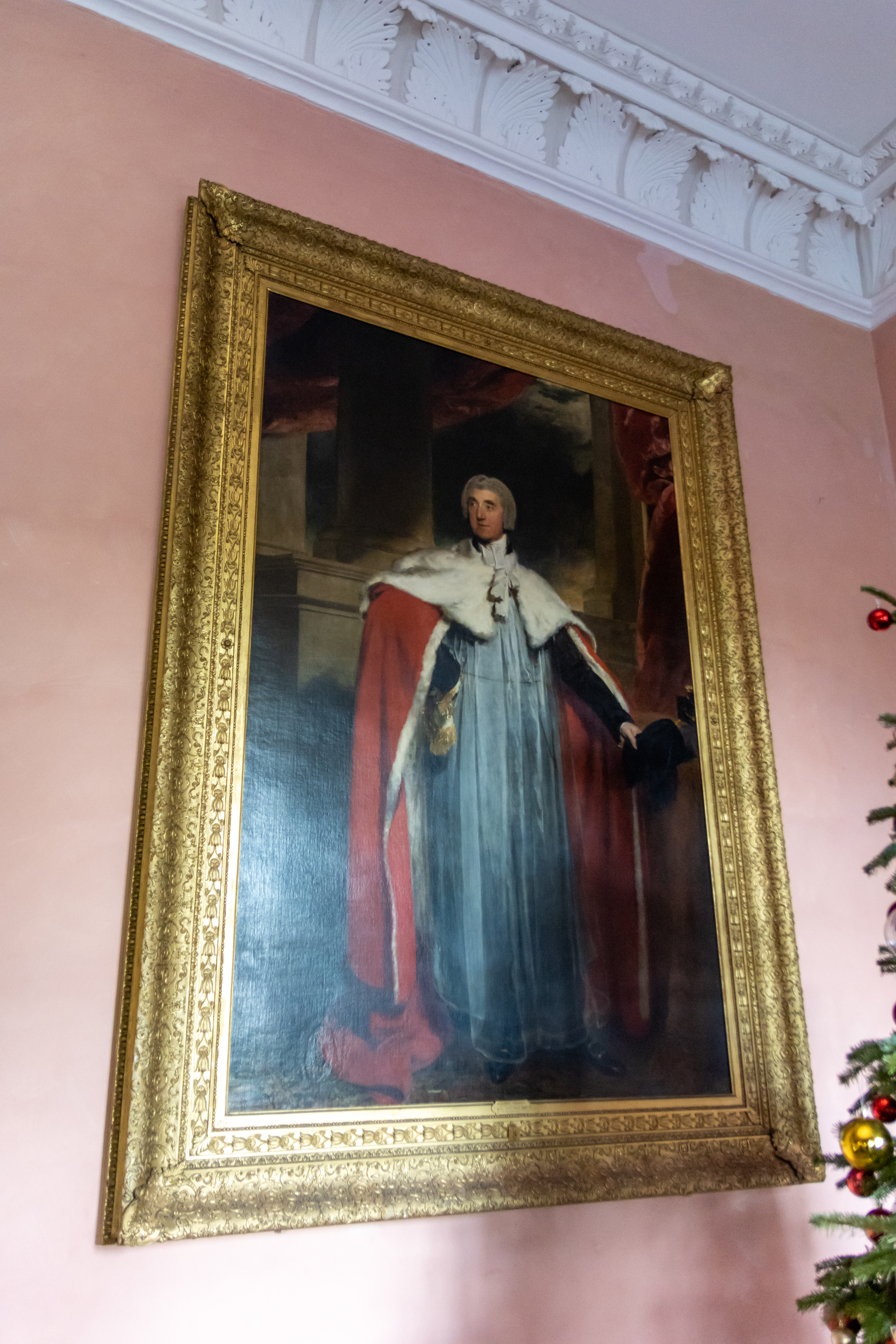
Edward Venables-Vernon-Harcourt, Archbishop of York, by Sir Thomas Lawrence (1823)

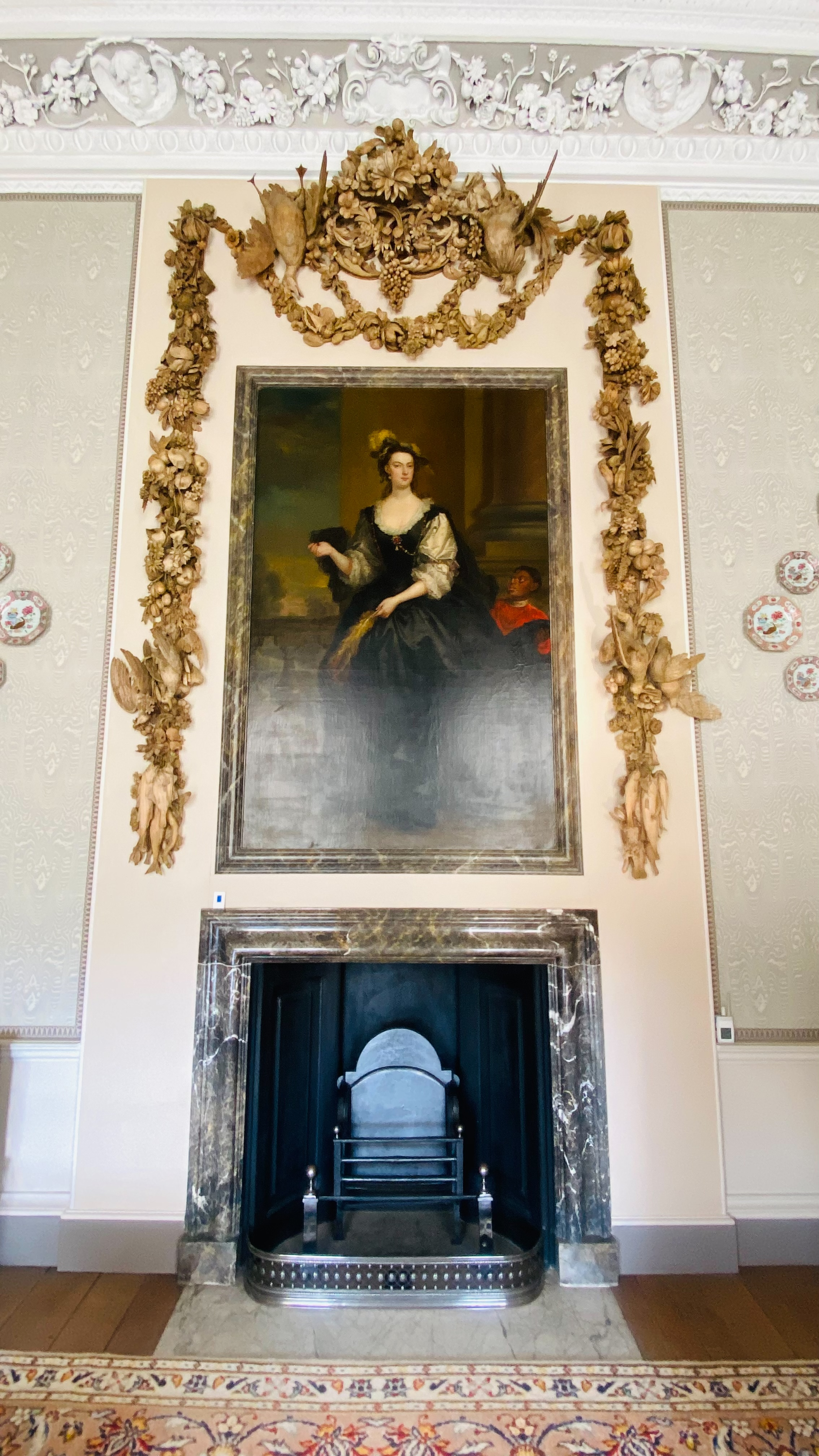
The Hon. Anne Howard, Lady Yonge (d.1775) by John Vanderbank (1737); overmantel by Grinling Gibbons

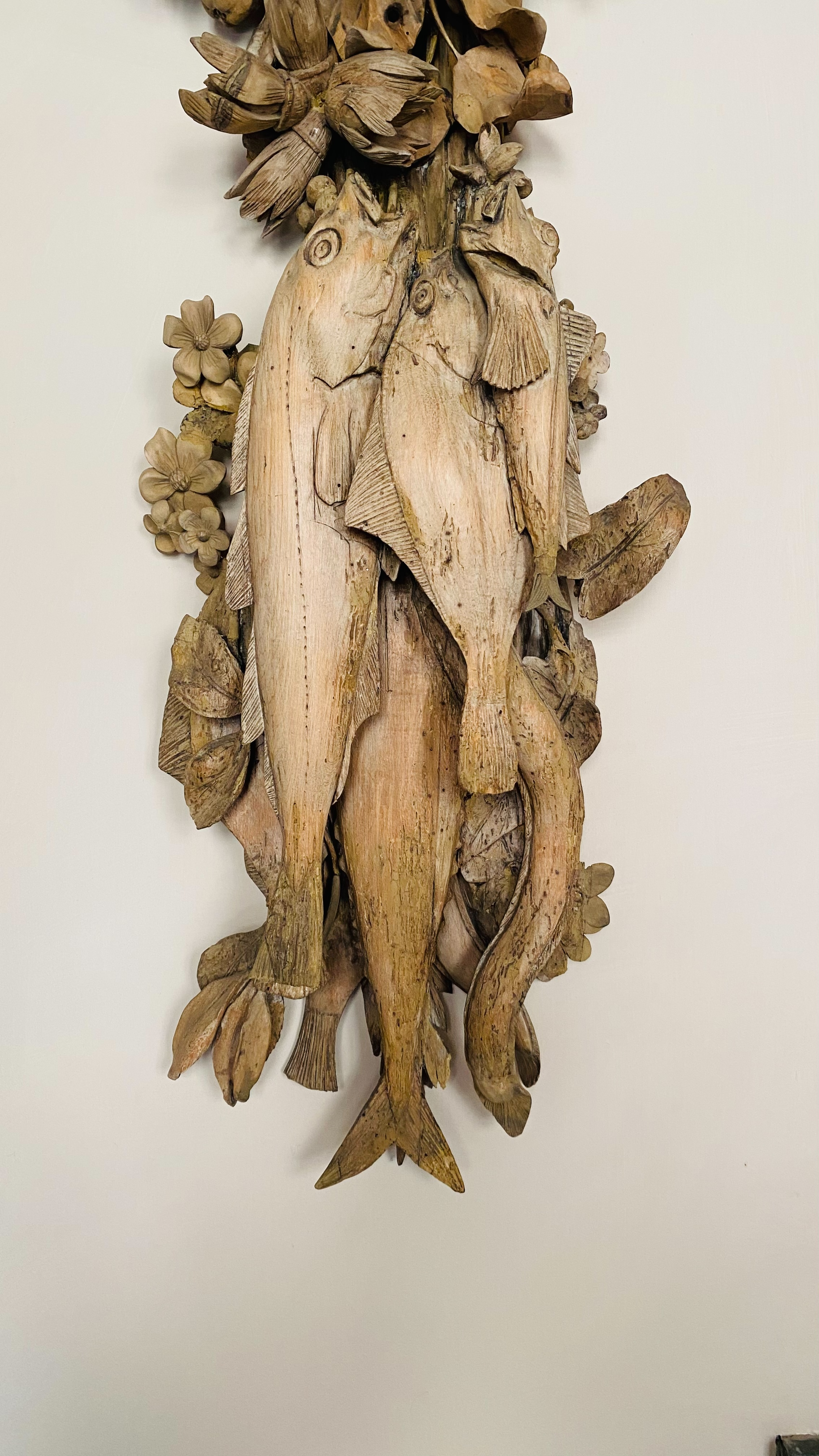
Overmantel by Grinling Gibbons (detail)

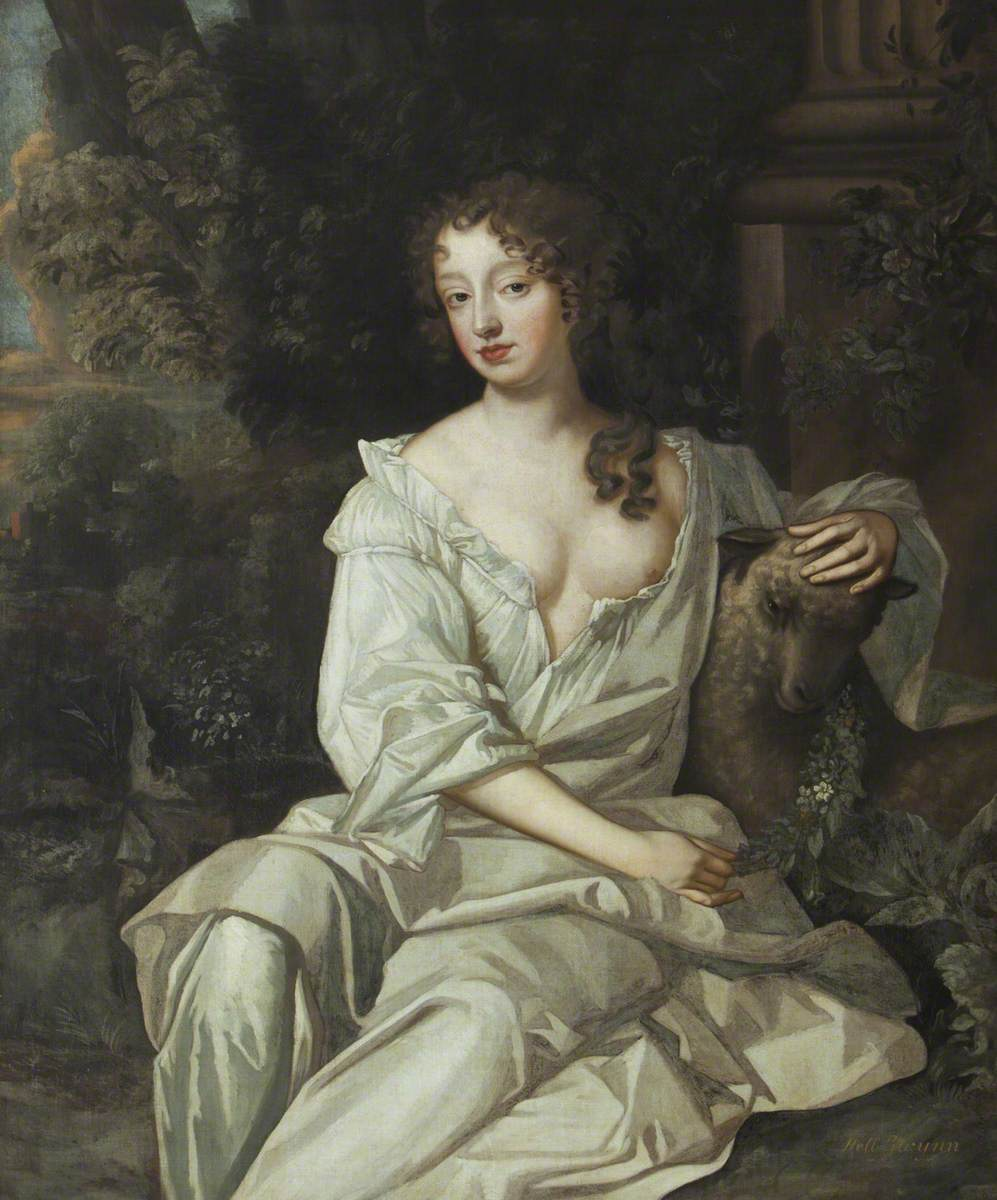
Nell Gwyn by Peter Lely (c.1675)

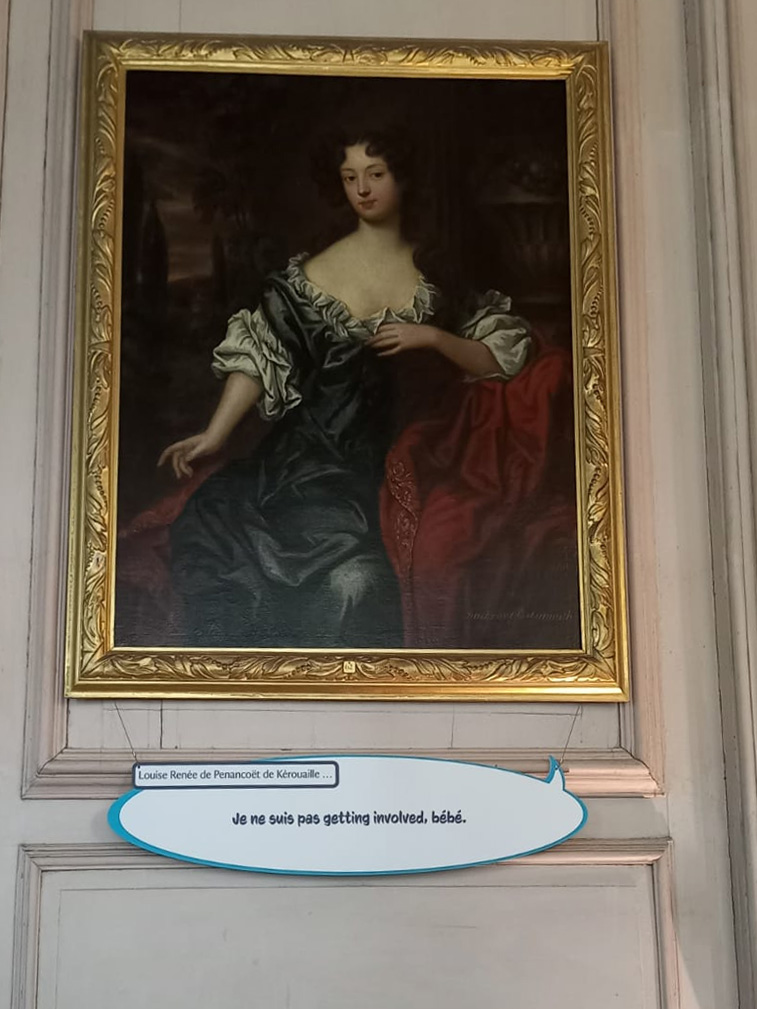
Louise de Kérouaille, Duchess of Portsmouth, attr. Sir Godfrey Kneller (1670) with National Trust speech bubble

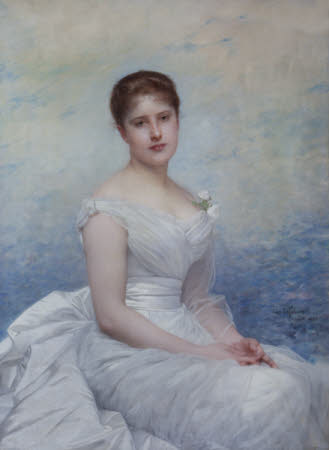
Frances Margaret Lawrance, Lady Vernon by Jules Joseph Lefebvre (1883)

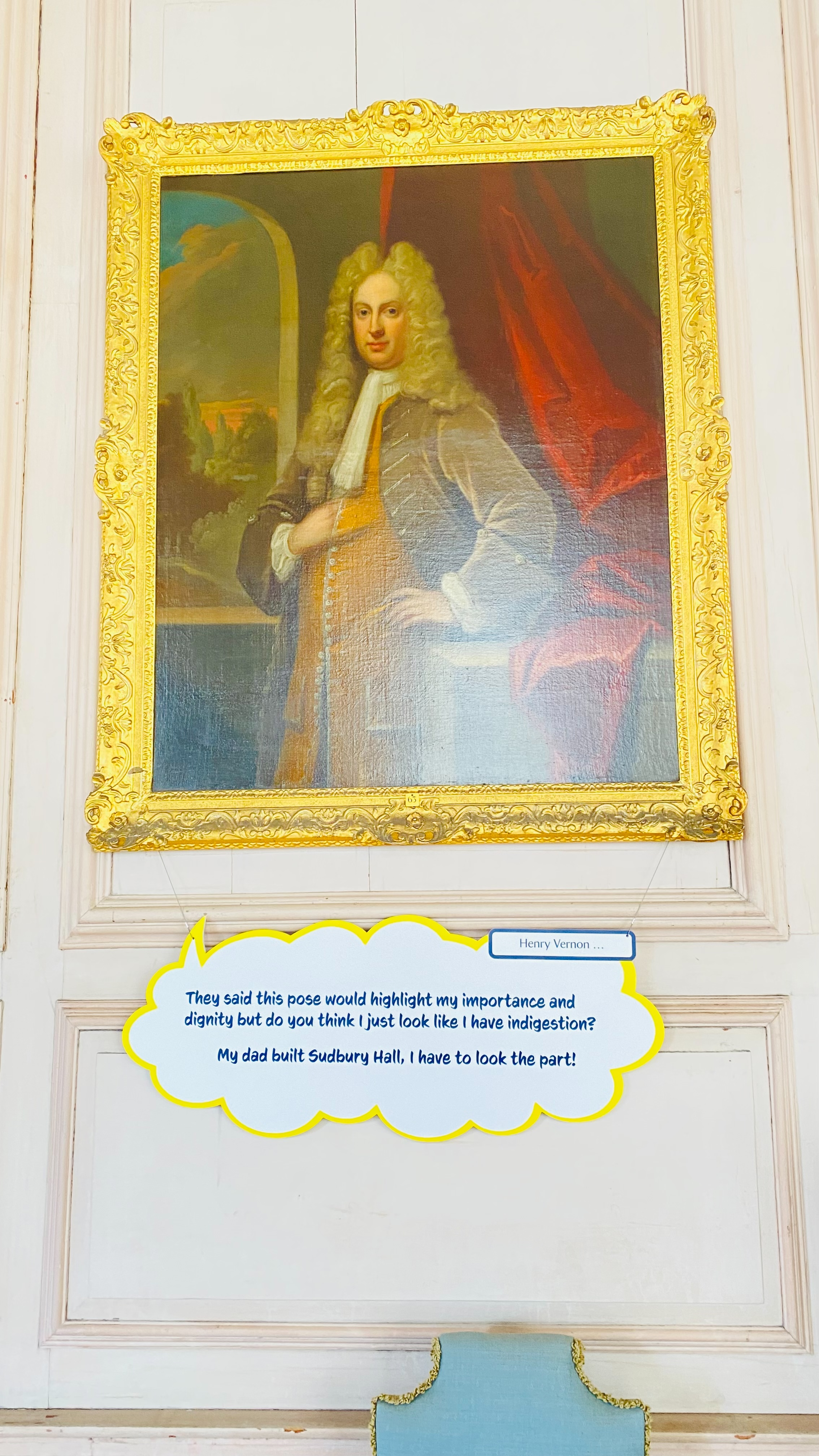
Henry Vernon by John Riley, with National Trust speech bubble

== Filming location ==
The house was used for the internal Pemberley scenes in the BBC dramatisation (1995) of Jane Austen's Pride and Prejudice. The house's centrally-positioned domed cap-house featured in the title shot of Yorkshire Television's children's programme The Book Tower.

== See also ==
- Catherine Pegge
- Deercote, Sudbury Park
- George John Venables-Vernon, 5th Baron Vernon
- Grade I listed buildings in Derbyshire
- Listed buildings in Sudbury, Derbyshire
