= George Venables-Vernon, 7th Baron Vernon =

British Liberal politician (1854-1898)

The Right Honourable The Lord Vernon PC
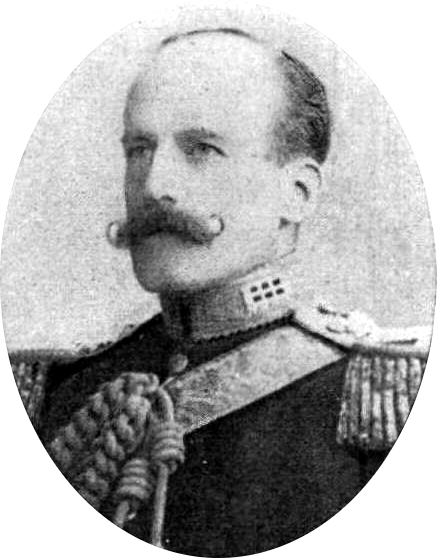
- Photograph of George Venables-Vernon

Captain of the Honourable Corps of Gentlemen-at-Arms
- In office 25 August 1892 – 13 March 1894
- Monarch: Victoria
- Prime Minister: William Ewart Gladstone
- Preceded by: The Earl of Yarborough
- Succeeded by: The Earl of Chesterfield

Personal details
- Born: 25 February 1854
- Died: 15 December 1898 (aged 44)
- Party: Liberal
- Spouse: Frances Margaret Lawrance (m. 1885)
- Children: 3

George William Henry Venables-Vernon, 7th Baron Vernon PC (25 February 1854 – 15 December 1898), styled The Honourable George Venables-Vernon from 1866 to 1883, was a British Liberal politician. He served as Captain of the Honourable Corps of Gentlemen-at-Arms under William Gladstone from 1892 to 1894.

== Early life ==
Vernon was born on 25 February 1854. He was the eldest surviving son of Augustus Henry Venables-Vernon, 6th Baron Vernon, and his wife Lady Harriet Frances Maria Anson (1827–1898). Among her siblings were Hon. Mildred Venables-Vernon (who married Hon. Henry Augustus Stanhope, a son of the 5th Earl Stanhope).

His paternal grandparents were George Warren, 5th Baron Vernon and Isabella Caroline Ellison (a daughter of Cuthbert Ellison, MP for Newcastle-upon-Tyne). His maternal grandparents were Thomas Anson, 1st Earl of Lichfield, and the former Louisa Catherine Philips (a daughter of Nathaniel Philips).

== Career ==
He succeeded his father in the barony in 1883, when he inherited around 10,000 acres (4,000 ha) of land in Cheshire, Derbyshire and Staffordshire.

=== Political career ===
Vernon sat on the Liberal benches in the House of Lords and served in the last Liberal administration of William Ewart Gladstone as Captain of the Honourable Corps of Gentlemen-at-Arms from 1892 to 1894. In 1892 he was sworn of the Privy Council.

== Personal life ==
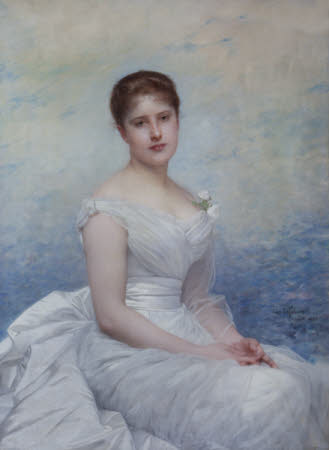
Portrait of Frances Margaret Lawrance, Lady Vernon, by Jules Joseph Lefebvre

On 14 July 1885, Lord Vernon married Frances Margaret Lawrance at St George's, Hanover Square in London. Frances was a daughter of Francis C. Lawrance, of New York City and sister to Francis C. Lawrance Jr. Together, they were the parents of:

- Hon. Frances Lawrance Venables-Vernon (b. 1886), who married Maurice Raoul-Duval of the Château de Marolles in 1910. After he was killed in action in 1916, she married Lt. Jean de Kermaignant in 1918.
- George Francis Augustus Venables-Vernon, 8th Baron Vernon (1888–1915), who died, unmarried, from illness contracted while on service in Gallipoli.
- Francis Lawrance William Venables-Vernon, 9th Baron Vernon (1889–1963), who married Violet Miriam Nightingale Clay, daughter of Col. Charles Herbert Clay and Violet Harriet Nightingale (a daughter of Sir Henry Nightingale, 13th Baronet), in 1915.

He died in December 1898, aged 44, and was succeeded in the barony by his eldest son, George. His widow, Lady Vernon, died on 23 June 1940.

Political offices
Preceded by The Earl of Yarborough	Captain of the Honourable Corps of Gentlemen-at-Arms; 1892–1894	Succeeded by The Earl of Chesterfield
Peerage of Great Britain
Preceded by Augustus Venables-Vernon	Baron Vernon; 1883–1898	Succeeded by George Venables-Vernon
