= Sudbury, Derbyshire =

Village and civil parish in Derbyshire Dales district, Derbyshire, England

Coordinates: 52.886°N 1.762°W

Sudbury
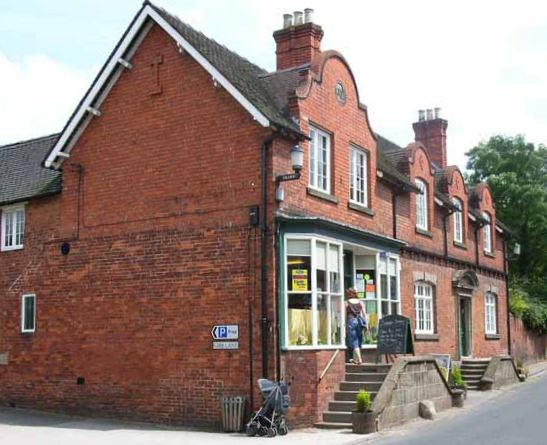
- Sudbury Village Store.

- Location within Derbyshire
- Population: 976
- OS grid reference: SK161320
- District: Derbyshire Dales
- Shire county: Derbyshire
- Region: East Midlands
- Country: England
- Sovereign state: United Kingdom
- Post town: ASHBOURNE
- Postcode district: DE6
- Police: Derbyshire
- Fire: Derbyshire
- Ambulance: East Midlands
- UK Parliament: Derbyshire Dales

Sudbury is a village and civil parish in Derbyshire, England, located about 9 miles (14 km) south of Ashbourne. It is part of the Derbyshire Dales district. The population as recorded at the 2001 Census was 976, increasing to 1,010 at the 2011 Census. The £0.5m A50 bypass opened in 1972. The parish includes the hamlets of Aston, Aston Heath, Dalebrook and Oaks Green.

Sudbury Hall and HM Prison Sudbury are located here.

== History ==
Sudbury was mentioned in the Domesday Book as belonging to Henry de Ferrers and was worth twenty shillings.

Sudbury previously had its own railway station that is now closed.

=== 1955 mid-air collision ===
On Wednesday 21 September 1955 at 12.25am, two Gloster Meteor aircraft collided at 20,000ft, flying on a night exercise from RAF North Luffenham in Rutland. Three aircrew parachuted, but one did not.

A pilot and navigator parachuted on to the land of Fred Lemon of Longford, where the navigator parachuted into a tree and Derbyshire Fire Service had to reach him. Fire engines came from Burton, Uttoxeter and Tutbury. Ambulances came from Burton and Uttoxeter. Lemon gave the two aircrew a cup of tea. After a three-hour search, a pilot, 21-year-old Pilot Officer Michael Aubrey Longman, of 17 Allandale Crescent, Potters Bar, was found dead in a grass field; he flew Meteor WS621. The surviving pilot was Pilot Officer Anthony John Gladwell, 22, of 622 Wollaton Road, Nottingham, who had attended Nottingham High School and flew Meteor WS683. The two surviving navigators were Pilot Officer David James Harrington, and Pilot Officer Brian Morton Bayley.

== Famous residents ==
- Thomas Alleyne (c. 1488–1558), priest who founded several schools.
- George Venables-Vernon, 1st Baron Vernon (1709–1780), politician from Sudbury Hall, MP for Lichfield, 1731/1747 and Derby, 1754/1762
- Edward Harcourt (1757–1847), Archbishop of York, was born here.
- William Harcourt (1789–1871), founder of the British Association for the Advancement of Science, was born here.
- George John Venables-Vernon, 5th Baron Vernon (1803–1866), M.P. for Derbyshire 1831/1835 and Dante enthusiast, died locally
- William Henry Holmes (1812–1885), pianist, composer and teacher at the Royal Academy of Music.

== See also ==
- Listed buildings in Sudbury, Derbyshire
