= James F. D. Lanier Residence =

Historic house in Manhattan, New York

- U.S. National Register of Historic Places
- U.S. Historic district – Contributing property
- New York State Register of Historic Places
- New York City Landmark
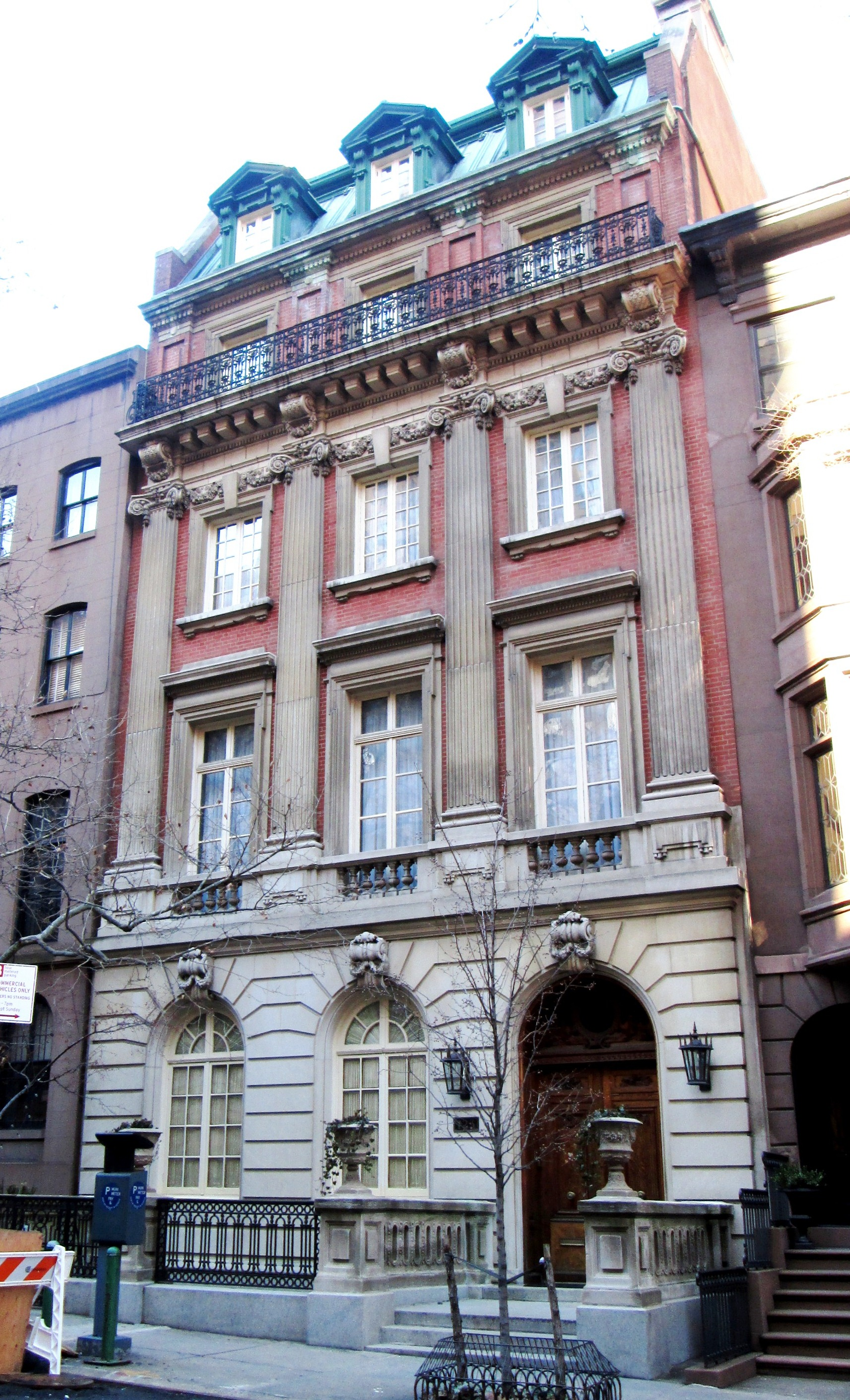
- (2008)

- Location within New York City Location within New York Location within the United States
- Location: 123 East 35th Street; Manhattan, New York
- Coordinates: 40°44′51″N 73°58′47″W
- Built: 1901-03
- Architect: Hoppin & Koen
- Architectural style: Beaux-Arts
- Part of: Murray Hill Historic District (ID03000997)
- NRHP reference No.: 82003383
- NYSRHP No.: 06101.001706
- NYCL No.: 1048

Significant dates
- Added to NRHP: June 3, 1982
- Designated CP: November 5, 2003
- Designated NYSRHP: April 9, 1982
- Designated NYCL: September 11, 1979

The James F. D. Lanier Residence, also known as the James F. D. and Harriet Lanier House is a historic house at 123 East 35th Street between Park and Lexington Avenues in the Murray Hill neighborhood of Manhattan, New York City.

== History ==
The residence was built in 1901–03, replacing two older houses on the site, and was designed in the Beaux-Arts style by Hoppin & Koen, who had studied at the École des Beaux-Arts in Paris, and worked in the office of McKim, Mead & White. The home was built for James F. D. Lanier, son of banker Charles D. Lanier, and his wife Harriet Bishop Lanier, daughter of Heber R. Bishop. It has a floor area of 11,638 square feet (1,081 m^{2}).

The house was designated a New York City landmark in 1979 and was added to the National Register of Historic Places in 1982.

The house was listed for sale by Christie's Real Estate in April 2022 for $33 million. The owner at the time was Bassam Alghanim, the Kuwaiti billionaire co-owner of the Alghanim Industries conglomerate.

== See also ==
- National Register of Historic Places listings in Manhattan from 14th to 59th Streets
- List of New York City Designated Landmarks in Manhattan from 14th to 59th Streets
