= James Lanier =

American entrepreneur, lawyer, and banker (1800–1881)

James F. D. Lanier
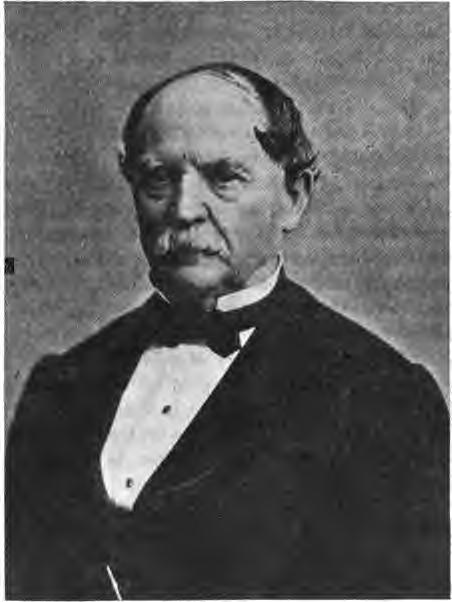
- Born: James Franklin Doughty Lanier; November 22, 1800; Beaufort County, North Carolina, U.S.
- Died: August 27, 1881 (aged 80); New York City, U.S.
- Education: Transylvania University
- Occupations: Businessman, banker
- Employer: Winslow, Lanier & Co.
- Spouses: Elizabeth Gardner (m. 1819; died 1846): Margaret Mary McClure
- Children: 11, including Charles

James Franklin Doughty Lanier (November 22, 1800 – August 27, 1881) was an entrepreneur who lived in Madison, Indiana, prior to the outbreak of the American Civil War (1861–1865). Lanier became a wealthy banker with interests in pork packing, the railroads, and real estate.

== Early life ==
James Lanier was born in 1800 in Beaufort County, North Carolina, to Alexander Chalmers Lanier Sr. (1778–1820) and Drusilla Cleaves Doughty (died 1838). His home was in Bourbon county Kentucky from 1802 to 1807 and then in Eaton Ohio until 1817, when his family moved to Madison, Indiana, the year after it became a state and lived at Schofield House. He studied law at Transylvania University and began practicing in 1820. According to an ad placed in the Indiana Republican newspaper of August 17, 1820, Lanier's first law office at Madison was "in the south wing of Col. Stapp's brick house, in the room…at present occupied by Dr. [Robert] Cravens," father of the man Lanier's daughter Drucilla would later marry.

== Career ==
During the 1820s, he was assistant clerk for the Indiana Legislature and later Clerk of the Indiana House of Representatives, where he was involved in assisting to move the capital from Corydon to Indianapolis in 1825.

In the early 1830s, Lanier became involved in banking. He became president of the Bank of Indiana in 1833 and eventually became a large shareholder of its Madison branch and was also on the board of directors that oversaw all branches. In the later 1830s, Lanier was involved with construction of the state's first major rail line connecting Madison and Indianapolis. He became a major stockholder in the line, which was finally finished in 1847. The line turned out to be very profitable.

The same year, Lanier represented Indiana in a meeting with its European creditors. The state was on the verge of bankruptcy due to extreme overspending on internal improvement over the previous decade and was liquidating its assets. Lanier was able to negotiate the transfer of ownership of most of the Indiana canals to their bond holders in exchange for a 50% reduction in the value of the bonds.

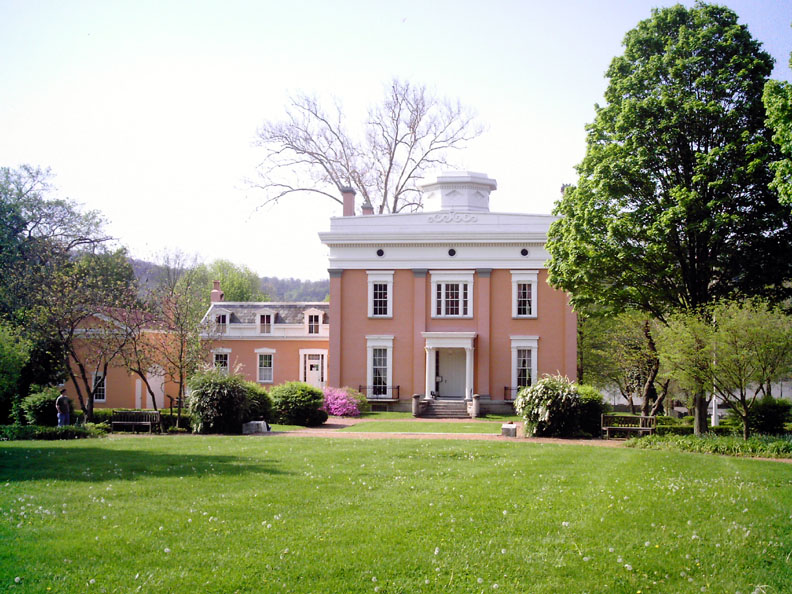
Lanier Mansion in Madison

His sudden wealth allowed him to build a large mansion in Madison; it was completed in 1844. His wife Elizabeth died in 1846 and he was remarried to Margaret Mary McClure in 1848.

In 1849, he began trading railroad shares in New York in a bank he started there in the same year with Richard Winslow called Winslow, Lanier & Co. In 1851, he moved to the state of New York, where he would manage his new business. He never moved back to Indiana.

At the request of Gov. Oliver P. Morton, Lanier loaned the Indiana government over one million dollars without security to help the state avoid bankruptcy during the American Civil War. The money was used to pay interest on the state debt and outfit troops. It was all repaid by 1870. The state, grateful for his help, has preserved his residence in Madison, the Lanier Mansion, as a state historic site.

== Personal life ==
In 1819, he married his first wife, Elizabeth G. Gardner (1798–1846). Following Elizabeth's death, he married Margaret Mary McClure (1825–1903).

- Alexander Chalmers Lanier (1820–1895), an attorney who married Stella Louise Searing Godman (1825–1899).
- Elizabeth Frances Lanier (1822–1910), who married Brig. Gen. William McKee Dunn (1814–1887).
- Drucilla Ann Lanier (1824–1903), who married John Robert Cravens (1819–1899), the Lieutenant Governor of Indiana.
- Margaret Downing Lanier (b. 1827)
- John James Lanier (1829–1836), who died young.
- Mary Lanier (b. 1832), who married John Cameron Stone (d. 1862).
- Louisa Morris Lanier (1835–1885)
- Charles D. Lanier (1837–1926), who married Sarah E. Egleston, and who was a close friend of Pierpont Morgan, who carried on Winslow, Lanier & Co. after Lanier's death.
- Jean Lanier (1849–1849), who died young.
- James Lanier (1851–1856), who died young.
- Katherine Howard Steuart Lanier (b. 1858), who married Myles Standish (d. 1915).

Lanier died on August 27, 1881, in New York City. His funeral was held at the Presbyterian Church at University Place and 10th Street in Manhattan and he was then buried at Green-Wood Cemetery.

=== Descendants ===
Through his youngest son, Charles, he was the grandfather of James F. D. Lanier (1858–1928), who married Harriet Bishop in 1885; Sarah Eggleston (née Lanier) Lawrence (1862–1893), Fanny (née Lanier) Appleton (1864–1958), who was married to Francis Randall Appleton, and Elizabeth Gardner (née Lanier) Turnure (1870–1935), who was married to George Evans Turnure (d. 1933).

His 3rd cousin in 4 generations is record producer Quincy Jones, whose maternal great-grandmother was an enslaved person.
