= James Cunningham Bishop =

American banker (1870-1932)

- Born: May 13, 1870; Irvington-on-Hudson, New York, US
- Died: June 1, 1932 (aged 62); Philadelphia, Pennsylvania, US
- Education: Harvard University
- Spouse: Abigail Adams Hancock (div. 1913)
- Children: 5
- Parent(s): Heber R. Bishop; Mary Cunningham Bishop

James Cunningham Bishop (May 13, 1870 – June 1, 1932), son of New York capitalist Heber R. Bishop, was a banker.

== Early life ==
Bishop was born on May 13, 1870, in Irvington-on-Hudson, New York. He was the son of Heber R. Bishop (1840–1902) and the former Mary Cunningham (1842–1905). Among his siblings were Mary Cunningham Bishop, Elizabeth Templeton Bishop (wife of James Low Harriman, eldest son of Oliver Harriman) Harriet Arnold Bishop (wife of James F. D. Lanier), Heber Reginald Bishop Jr., Francis Cunningham Bishop, Edith Bishop, (wife of Moses Taylor V, a grandson of Moses Taylor), and Ogden Mills Bishop.

He was a graduate of Harvard University.

== Career ==
After graduating from Harvard, Bishop became an associate member of Redmond & Co. of New York, a securities firm, in 1904. Beginning in 1916, he was a "heavy stockholder and officer" of the Welsbach Street Illuminating Company. At the time of his death, Bishop served as vice president and treasurer of the firm.

He also served as a director of the Syracuse Lighting Company and held directorates or executive positions in the American Street Lighting Company, the Barron Collier Company, the Kitson Company, the Pennsylvania Globe Company, and the Automatic Lighting Company, as well as a group of Welsbach enterprises.

== Personal life ==
Bishop married Abigail Adams Hancock (1870–1949), niece of Winfield Scott Hancock, in 1891 and had five children. They divorced in 1913 in what was an early, high-profile divorce. Bishop's attorney was Henry Waters Taft, brother of ex-president William Howard Taft.

- Mary Cunningham Bishop (1893–1980), who married John Damon Peabody (1883–1944), a son of Charles A. Peabody Jr. and brother of Julian Livingston Peabody.
- Augusta Hancock Bishop (b. 1894), who married David Rives Sigourney (1893–1968), a descendant of William Cabell Rives, in 1917.
- Natalie Holmes Bishop (1898–1960), who married Charles Francis Choate III (1893–1930).
- Muriel Bishop (1901–1992), who married Benjamin Rush.
- Abigail Hancock Bishop (1905–1997), who married Winthrop Donnison Hodges.

On June 1, 1932, Bishop was found dead at the wheel of his car in his garage in Philadelphia, Pennsylvania. Although the motor was running when he was discovered by a gardener, investigators concluded that the cause of death was heart disease rather than gas fumes.

=== Descendants ===
Through his youngest daughter, Abigail, he is the great-grandfather of Fidelity Investments multi-billionaire Abigail Johnson.
