= Charles D. Lanier =

American banker and railroad executive (1837–1926)

Charles Lanier
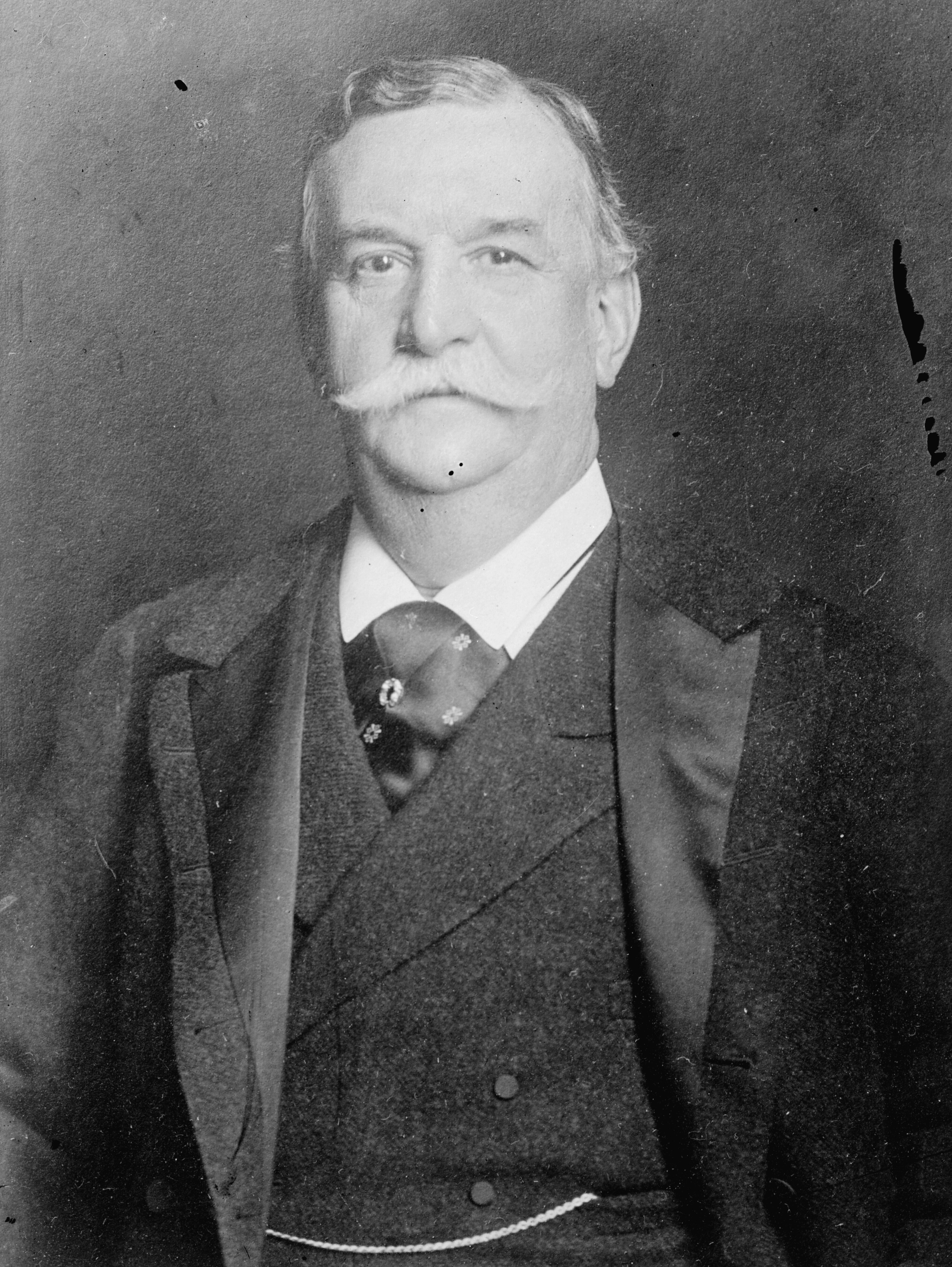
- Lanier, c. 1910–1915
- Born: January 19, 1837; Madison, Indiana, U.S.
- Died: March 6, 1926 (aged 89); New York City, U.S.
- Education: Russell Military Academy
- Spouse: Sarah E. Egleston (m. 1857; died 1898)
- Children: 4
- Parent(s): James F. D. Lanier; Elizabeth Gardner
- Relatives: Charles Lawrance (grandson); John R. Cravens (brother-in-law); William McKee Dunn (brother-in-law)

Charles D. Lanier (January 19, 1837 – March 6, 1926) was an American banker, and railroad executive who inherited the bulk of his father's fortune, who was a close friend of J.P. Morgan.

== Early life ==
Lanier was born on January 19, 1837, in Madison, Indiana. He was the son of James Franklin Doughty Lanier (1800–1881) and Elizabeth (née Gardner) Lanier (1798–1846). He was the brother of Alexander Chalmers Lanier; Elizabeth Frances Lanier, who married Brig. Gen. William McKee Dunn; Drucilla Ann Lanier, who married John Robert Cravens, the Lieutenant Governor of Indiana; Mary Lanier, who married John Cameron Stone; Louisa Morris Lanier; and Katherine Howard Lanier.

In 1655, his ancestor, Thomas Lanier, a French Huguenot refugee, came to America accompanied by John Washington, the great-grandfather of President George Washington. Thomas, who settled in Westmoreland County, Virginia, married Washington's daughter, Anne Washington (1662–1697).

== Career ==
In 1859, he joined his father in the family banking establishment, Winslow, Lanier & Co., that was founded in 1849 with Richard H. Winslow. He was given an interest in 1860, and later became head of the firm. The younger Lanier worked continuously at Winslow, Lanier & Co. for sixty-seven years, one of the longest careers in banking at that time.

He served on the boards of the Southern Railway, the Pittsburgh, Fort Wayne & Chicago Railway (of which he was president and his father was the first president), Massillon & Cleveland Railroad, and a trustee of the Central Union Trust Company. In addition, he was a director of the Central Railroad of New Jersey, the West Shore Railroad, the Western Union Telegraph Co., The Central & South American Telegraph Co., the Madison Square Garden Co., and the National Bank of Commerce.

Lanier was a close friend of fellow banker J.P. Morgan, and the two worked together on many of the largest and most important transactions of the day. Lanier was part of the small group, known as the "Corsair Club," as it met on Morgan's yacht, the ‘’Corsair’’.

== Social affiliations ==
He also served on the board of the American Museum of Natural History for forty-eight years, retiring in 1923. He was a member of the Metropolitan Club, The Union League Club, the Knickerbocker Club, the New York Yacht Club and the Pilgrim Club.

== Personal life ==
On October 7, 1857, Lanier was married to Sarah E. Egleston (1837–1898), the daughter of Thomas Egleston. Together, they were the parents of:

- James Franklin Doughty Lanier (1858–1928), who married Harriet Arnold Bishop (1866-1931), daughter of Heber R. Bishop. in 1885.
- Sarah Eggleston Lanier (1862–1893), who married Francis C. Lawrance Jr. After her death in 1893, Lawrance married Susan Ridgway Willing, the sister of Ava Lowle Willing (the wife of John Jacob Astor IV).
- Fanny Lanier (1864–1958), who was married to Francis Randall Appleton (1854–1929).
- Elizabeth Gardner Lanier (1870–1935), who was married to George Evans Turnure (d. 1933).

In 1882, Lanier and his wife built an estate called "Allen Winden" in Lenox, Massachusetts. After Lanier's death in 1926, the house was demolished, and replaced by a simpler home designed by Henry Seaver.

Lanier died on March 6, 1926, at his residence, 20 East Thirty-Sixth Street in Manhattan. He left an estate valued at $9,677,364.

=== Descendants ===
Through his daughter Sarah, he was the grandfather of engineer Charles Lawrance and Kitty Lanier Lawrance (1893–1936). Both Charles and Kitty were raised by their grandfather, as their parents died when she was still young. In 1915, Kitty married W. Averell Harriman (1891–1986), who later became the Governor of New York. They later divorced in 1928.
