= James F. D. Lanier =

James F. D. Lanier, II.
- Born: June 25, 1858; New York City, New York, U.S.
- Died: May 16, 1928 (aged 69); New York City, New York, U.S.
- Education: St. Paul's School
- Alma mater: Princeton University
- Spouse: Harriet Arnold Bishop (m. 1885)
- Children: 2
- Parent(s): Charles D. Lanier; Sarah Eggleston Lanier
- Relatives: James Lanier (grandfather); Charles Lawrance (nephew)

James Franklin Doughty Lanier II (June 25, 1858 – May 16, 1928) was an American banker and sportsman who was prominent in New York society during the Gilded Age.

== Early life ==
Lanier was born at his grandmother's residence, 10 Fifth Avenue in New York City, on June 25, 1858. He was the son of Charles D. Lanier (1837–1926) and Sarah (née Eggleston) Lanier (1837–1898). Among his siblings was Sarah Eggleston Lanier, who married Francis C. Lawrance Jr. (parents of engineer Charles Lawrence and Kitty Lanier Lawrance who married W. Averell Harriman; Francis married Susan Ridgway Willing after Sarah's death); Fanny Lanier, who married Francis Randall Appleton; and Elizabeth Gardner Lanier, who married George Evans Turnure.

His maternal grandfather was Thomas Eggleston. His paternal grandparents were his namesake, James Franklin Doughty Lanier and Elizabeth (née Gardner) Lanier. In 1655, his ancestor, Thomas Lanier, a French Huguenot refugee, came to America accompanied by John Washington, the great-grandfather of President George Washington. Thomas, who settled in Westmoreland County, Virginia, married Washington's daughter, Anne Washington (1662–1697).

Lanier attended St. Paul's School in Concord, New Hampshire, and graduated from Princeton University in 1880.

== Career ==
After graduating from Princeton in 1880, Lanier joined the family banking business of Winslow, Lanier & Co., founded by his grandfather in 1849. Lanier worked at Winslow, Lanier until his father's death in 1926, when he was succeeded by his surviving son, Reginald.

=== Society life ===
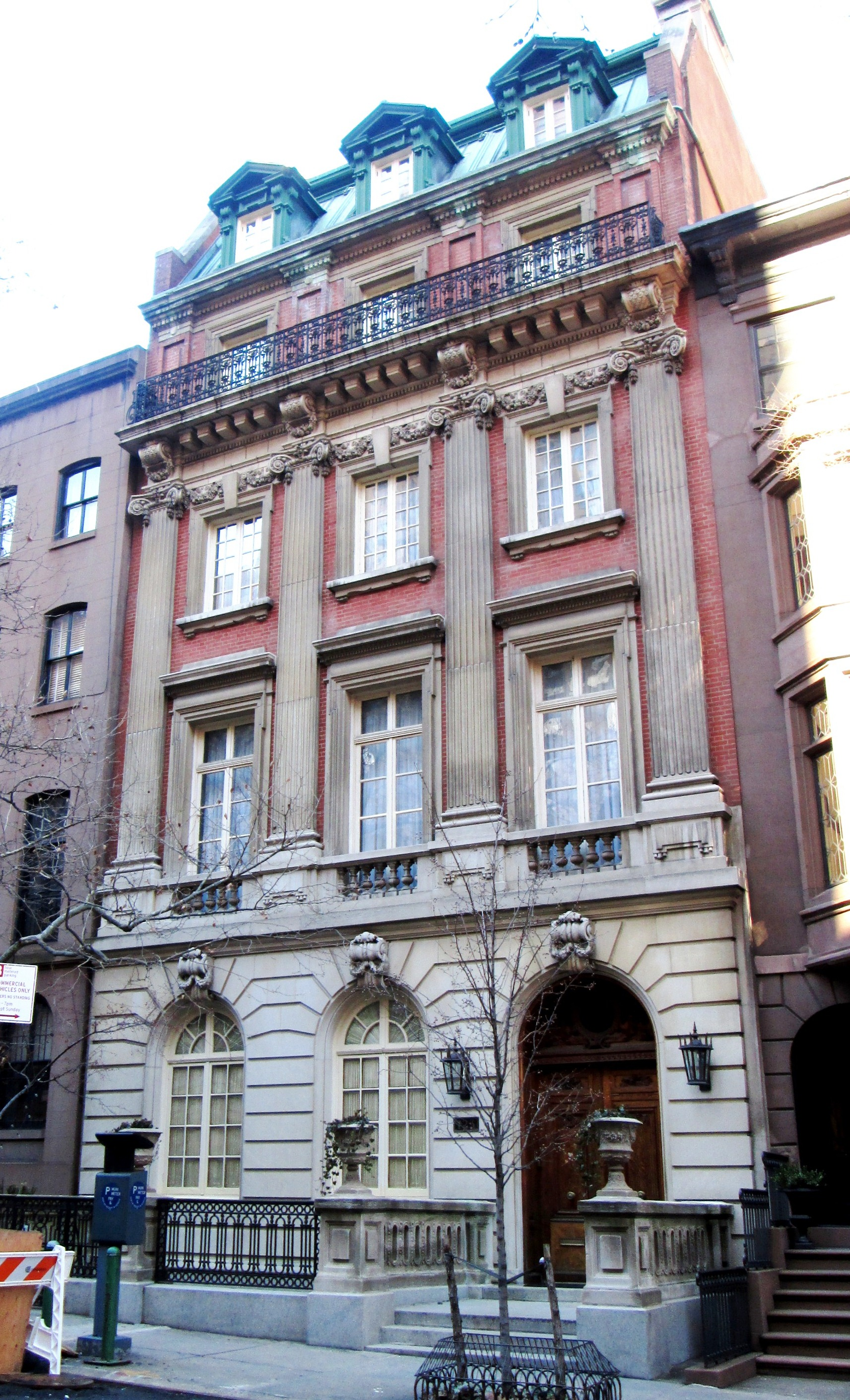
The James F. D. Lanier Residence at 123 East 35th Street

In 1892, Lanier and his wife were included in Ward McAllister's "Four Hundred", purported to be an index of New York's best families, published in The New York Times. Conveniently, 400 was the number of people that could fit into Mrs. Astor's ballroom.

He was one of the founders of the Meadow Brook Hunt Club, and one of the first automobile drivers in America, strongly interested in motor touring and racing. He was a member of the Automobile Club of America, the Knickerbocker Club, the Racquet and Tennis Club, and the Turf and Field Clubs.

Soon after the incorporation of the Mead Brook Club, Lanier had an estate, designed by prominent architect James Brown Lord, built in Old Westbury on Long Island that was completed in 1891. He sold the home, which he had been renting to Clarence Mackay, in 1900 to Hamilton Cary for $100,000. The Laniers also spent summers at "Gravel Court", off of Clay Street, in Newport, Rhode Island.

== Personal life ==
In 1885, Lanier was married to Harriet Bishop (1866–1931). Harriet was the daughter of Heber R. Bishop. In early 1900, Lanier purchased two adjacent 1854 brownstones located between Park and Lexington Avenues in Murray Hill, for $31,000 which he torn down to build his family residence. In 1903, Lanier and his wife moved into the, now landmarked, home they had built at 123 East 35th Street in Murray Hill. The home was designed in the Beaux-Arts style by Hoppin & Koen. Together, they were the parents of:

- Charles Day Lanier (1886–1918), who died at the 2,000 Lanier Ranch in Sheridan, Wyoming.
- Reginald Bishop Lanier (1888–1979), who married Helen Cameron (d. 1987), granddaughter of Frederic W. Rhinelander, in 1921.

Upon his father's death in 1926, the elder Lanier left an estate valued at $9,677,364, the bulk of which was left to James and his siblings.

Lanier died on May 16, 1928, at St. Elizabeth's Hospital in New York City. He was buried alongside his wife at Green-Wood Cemetery in Brooklyn, New York. Upon his death, he left an estate valued at around $10,000,000 which was left to his son Reginald after his widow's death, in 1931.
