= Walter M. Aikman =

Walter Montieth Aikman (1857–1939) was an engraver, etcher, bookplate designer, and visual artist. He was born in New York City, USA, and was buried in Green-Wood Cemetery in Brooklyn.

== Education ==
Aikman studied engraving under Frank French and J. C. Smithwick. He also studied art and engraving abroad. He studied drawing and painting in Paris under Gustave Boulanger and Jules Joseph Lefebvre.

== Awards ==
Aikman received medals for engraving at the 1889 Exposition Universelle in Paris and at the 1893 World's Columbian Exposition in Chicago.

== Artworks ==
Aikman presented two items as an American artist at the Exposition Universelle (1900), an original landscape and a jade screen engraving.

He led the group of engravers and artists illustrating of the printed catalog of the Heber R. Bishop jade collection donated to the Metropolitan Museum of Art in 1902. "...The following etchers and engravers took part in the work: Walter M. Aikman (b. 1857); Charles Jean Louis Courtry (b. 1846); Adolphe Alphonse Gery-Bichard (b. 1841); Paul Le Rat (b. 1840); Auguste Hilaire Leveille (b. 1840); Rodolphe Pignet (b. 1840); and Émile-Jean Sulpis."

In 1907, Aikman engraved "King's College 1756-1784 - Columbia College 1784-1857" which is held in the Harvard Art Museums/Fogg Museum, Transfer from the Fine Arts Library, Harvard University.

In 1912, he made the wood engraving, "The Blacksmith's Shop", which was later donated to the Metropolitan Museum of Art as the "Gift of Mrs. Schuyler Van Rensselaer (Mariana Griswold Van Rensselaer), 1917." Other items by Aikman in the museum collection include: the wood engraving, "The Lock, after Constable", 1912; the hand colored engraving, "City Hall and Park Row – 1831 (The Society of Iconophiles, Series XV, No. 2)", 1917 and the hand colored engraving, "A View of Broadway and Trinity Church in 1799 (The Society of Iconophiles, Series XV, No. 3)", from 1917.

== Bookplates ==
In "A Directory of Bookplate Artists, with notes concerning their work" (1921), edited and compiled by Alfred Fowler, Aikman provided the following statement: "I engrave bookplates on copper and wood and also etch them. I do not specialize. The cost depends on the time a given design takes to complete. I have been making bookplates for about eight or ten years."

"Walter M. Aikman was a noted artist and bookplate designer, who created a bookplate for Elizabeth Mast Hyatt herself in 1912. This design for Aikman's own bookplate shows a landscape with a pond, swan and human figure surrounded by an elaborate frame. The Latin inscription "Sub Robore Virtus" translates as "Virtue Under Strength."

"His latest and best is his own I have had the privilege to reproducing. The beautiful ornamental framework is engraved with the Burin. This Mr. Aikman cleverly adapted from an old Italian design. The central panel is a reduced copy, in etching, of Mr. Aikman's masterpiece in wood engraving, "Sunset, La Hulpe," engraved by him from his own design in oil while at La Hulpe, Belgium. As the wood engraving is eight by ten inches in size, Mr. Aikman has accomplished the difficult task of copying it so small a reproduction with remarkable skill and fidelity to the original.", said Radin, Herman.

== Biographies ==
- Fielding, Mantle. 1983. "Aikman, Walter Monteith". Mantle Fielding's Dictionary of American Painters, Sculptors & Engravers. 8.
- 1909. "Walter Monteith Aikman". Who's Who in New York City and State. 4: 12.
- Herringshaw, Thomas William. 1909. "Aikman, Walter Monteith". Herringshaw's National Library of American Biography: Contains Thirty-Five Thousand Biographies of the Acknowledged Leaders of Life and Thought of the United States; Illustrated with Three Thousand Vignette Portraits. Volume 1, page 65.
- Radin, Herman T. 1914. "Walter M. Aikman" American Bookplate Society. Pages 44–45.
