= Heber R. Bishop =

American businessman and art collector (1840–1902)

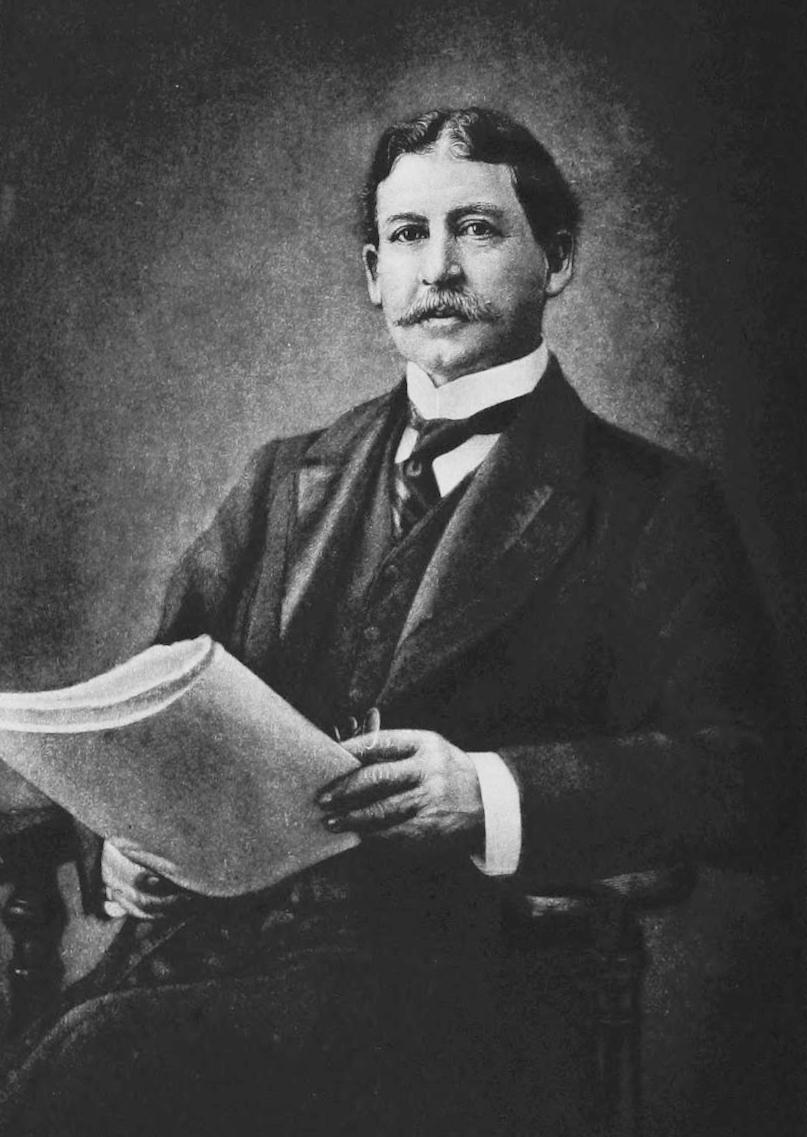
- Born: Heber Reginald Bishop; March 2, 1840; Medford, Massachusetts, U.S.
- Died: December 10, 1902 (aged 62); New York City, U.S.
- Resting place: Sleepy Hollow Cemetery, Sleepy Hollow, New York
- Occupations: Businessman, art collector
- Spouse: Mary Cunningham
- Children: 8
- Parent(s): Nathaniel Holmes Bishop; Mary Smith Farrar
- Relatives: Darius Ogden Mills (brother-in-law)

Signature
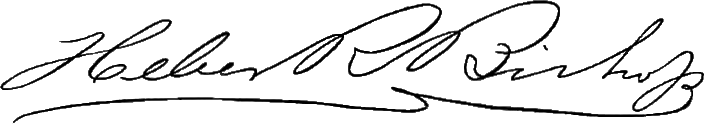

Heber Reginald Bishop (March 2, 1840 – December 10, 1902) was an American businessman and philanthropist of the late 19th and early 20th centuries. His collections of art, especially his noted collection of jade, were donated to museums. Bishop was a Trustee of the Metropolitan Museum in New York City during its early years.

== Early life ==
Heber Reginald Bishop was born in Medford, Massachusetts in 1840 to Nathaniel Holmes Bishop (1789–1850) and Mary Smith Farrar (1806–1881).

Bishop received a commercial education, until he moved to Remedios, Cuba at the age of 19 to begin work in the sugar business.

== Career ==
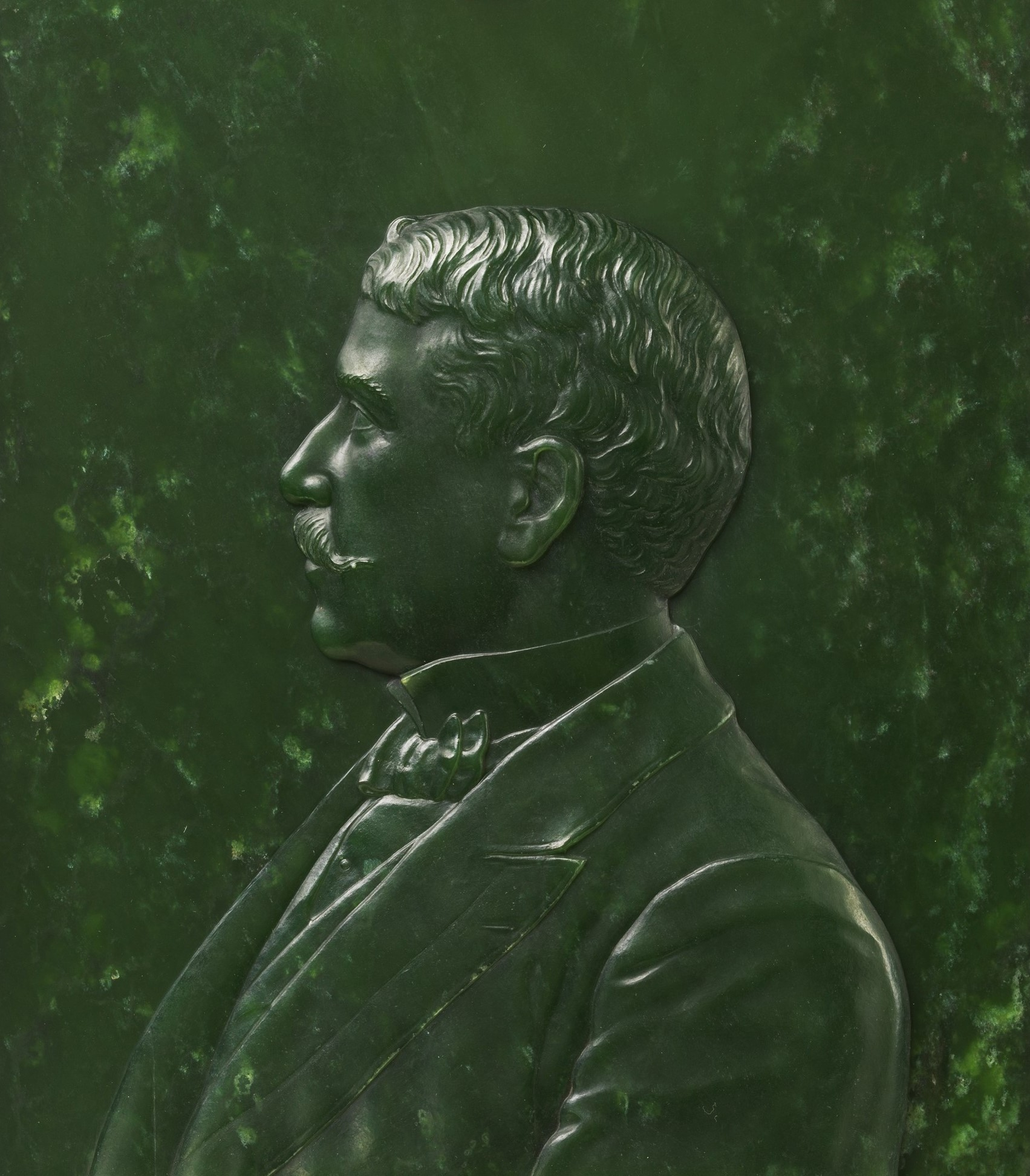
Portrait of Bishop in Jade, 1898

Within two years of moving to Cuba, Bishop had started a sugar refinery business there and began the Bishop & Company, which was sold in 1873 when he returned to the United States, first to his father-in-law's "Cunningham Castle" in Irvington, New York, and later to the Bishop home at 881 Fifth Ave. He then invested in a number of banking firms, iron and steel companies, railroads, and western mining companies.

He was a member of the Chamber of Commerce of New York, a director of the Chicago, Rock Island and Pacific Railroad Company, the Chicago, St. Paul, Minneapolis & Omaha Railway Company, the Chandler Iron Company, the Metropolitan Trust Company of New York, the Metropolitan Elevated Railroad Company, the New York Elevated Railroad, and the Lackawanna Iron and Steel Company. He was also a director and President of the Duluth & Iron Range Railroad and the Minnesota Iron Company.

In 1878, his mansion in Irvington on the Hudson River burned down. The building had a front of about 175 feet and was erected in 1863 by his father-in-law.

== Collections ==
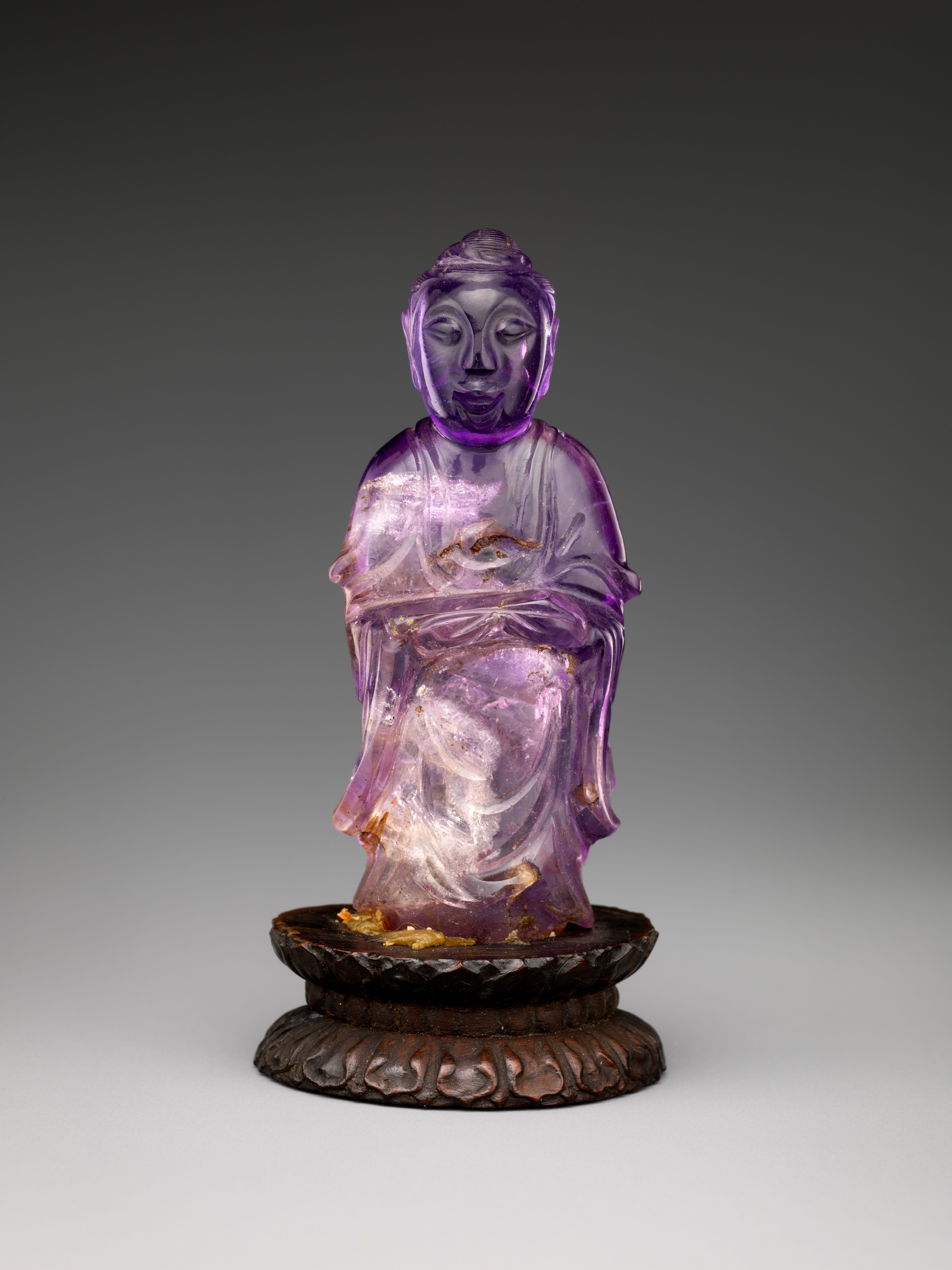
18th century Standing Buddha, donated by Bishop to the Met Museum, 1902

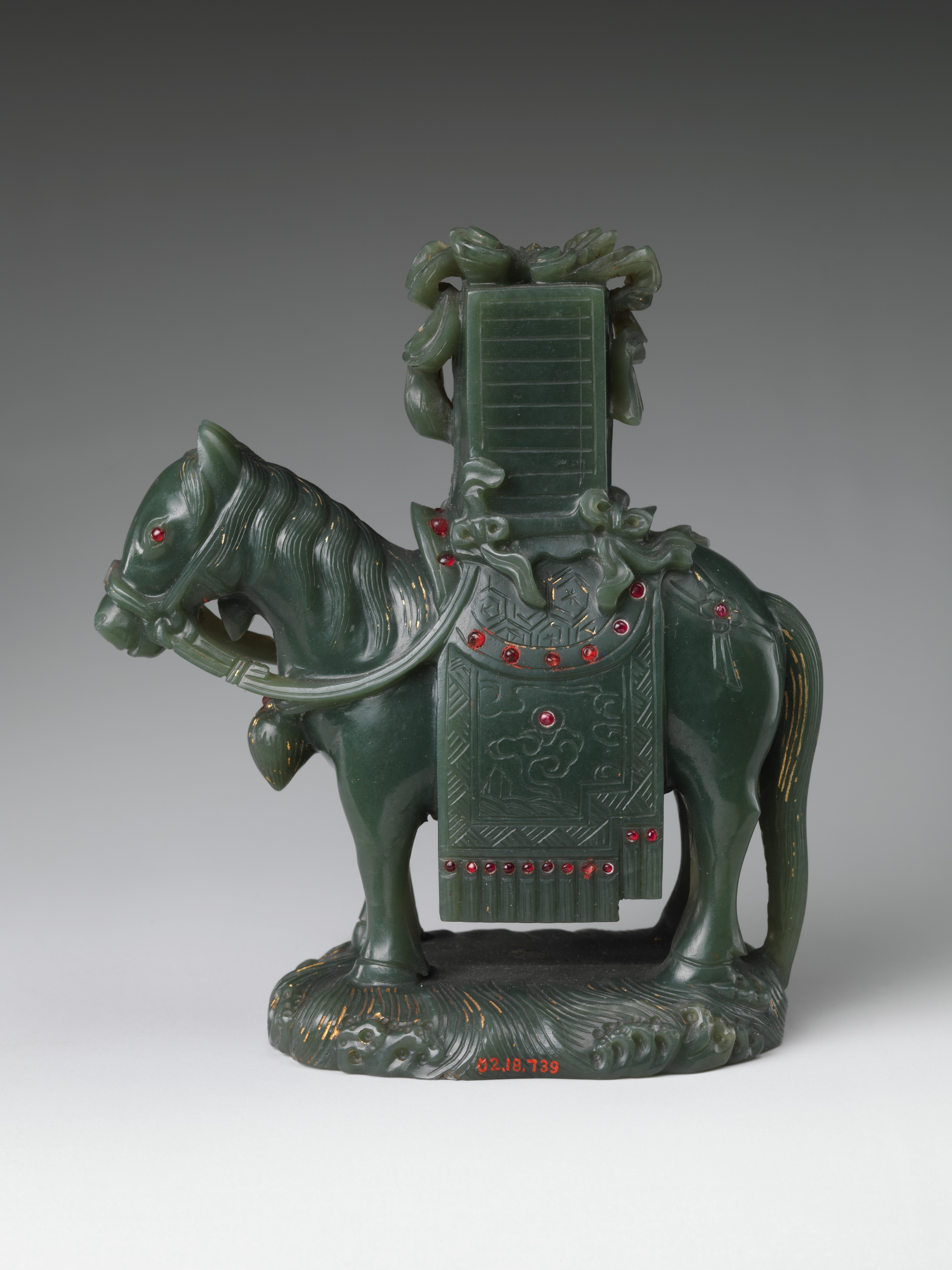
18th–19th century Horse carrying books donated by Bishop to the Met Museum, 1902

=== Jade Collection ===
The Bishop Jade Collection, donated by him to the Metropolitan Museum of Art, included not only artistic pieces from China and Japan, but also selections from Mexico, Central America, the northwest coast of America, Swiss lake dwellings, France, Italy, New Zealand and elsewhere. It included a rare crystal of jadeite and a single mass of nephrite from Jordanów Śląski, formerly known as Jordansmühl, Silesia.

The one thousand numbers included in the Bishop collection display first a mineralogical section in which samples of the minerals are shown from every known place where they may be found. An archaeological section presents specimens of implements, weapons and ornaments in which the material was wrought. The remainder of the collection embraces the art objects upon which the utmost resources of the glyptic art have been lavished. These have been gathered from China, India, Annam, Europe and New Zealand, and comprise every conceivable object of limpid beauty to which the material lends itself. Vases from China, with graceful lines, elegant shape, and patiently carved decoration; perfect boxes of soft sheen with jewelled decoration from India; and the modern work of Europe they all give the highest presentment of sensuous charm and artistry.

=== Jade Collection Catalog ===
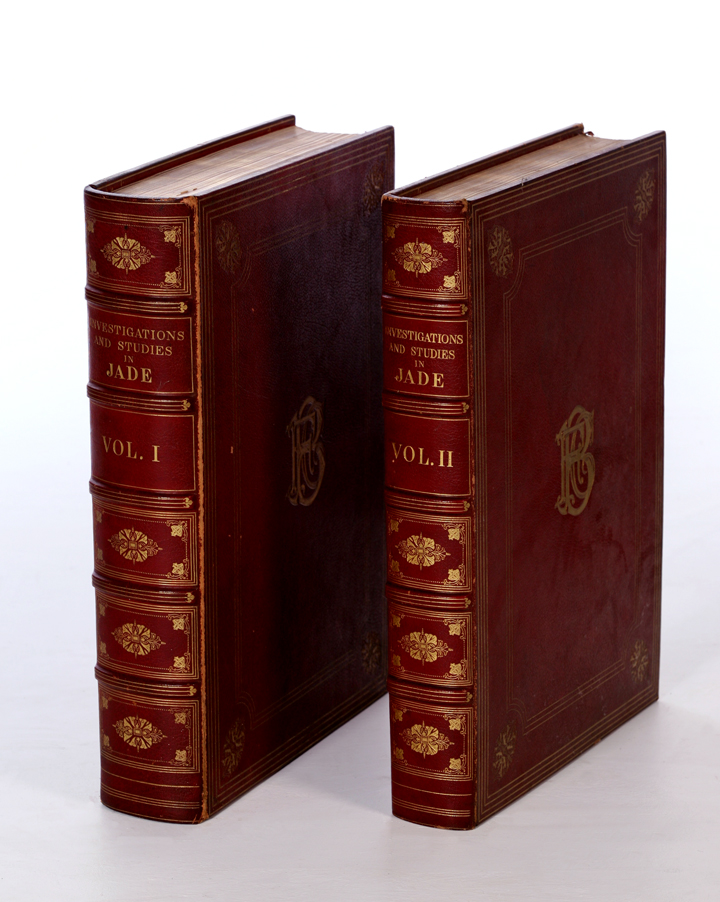
Investigations and Studies in Jade by Heber Reginald Bishop

An enormous catalog in two volumes, entitled Investigations and Studies in Jade, was made of the collection. The catalog, edited by Dr. Robert Lilley and assisted by R. W. Douglas, was limited to 100 numbered sets. The first eight sets were distributed to Bishop's children, two sets were sent to the Library of Congress to obtain copyright, and the rest were distributed to heads of government, libraries, and museums. Each set cost $1,800 to produce.

Contributors to the book included Dr. George Frederick Kunz, Dr. Stephen Wootton Bushell, Dr. William Hallock, Dr. Samuel Lewis Penfield, Professor Frank Wigglesworth Clarke, Logan Waller Page, Dr. Charles Palache, Dr. Henry Stephens Washington, Dr Joseph Edkins, Mrs. Zelia Nuttall, Eliza Ruhamah Scidmore, Ernst Weinschenk, and Tadamasa Hayashi.

The bound volumes were 19 x 26 inches and weighed, respectively, 70 and 55 pounds. The paper used for the volumes was specially made by the Brown Paper Company, and weighed 176 pounds to the ream. The stock was a combination of pure white cotton rags and linen, and no chemicals were employed. "The illustrations were made by various processes; etchings, wood-cuts, and lithographs. The following etchers and engravers took part in the work: Walter M. Aikman (b. 1857); Charles Jean Louis Courtrv (b. 1846); Adolphe Alphonse Gery-Bichard (b. 1841); Paul Le Rat (b. 1840); Auguste Hilaire Leveille (b. 1840); Rodolphe Pignet (b. 1840); and Émile-Jean Sulpis."

Contents of the catalog are: volume 1. General introduction. Jade in China: Introduction. Yü shuo. A discourse on jade. (Translation) Yü shuo. A discourse on jade. (Chinese text) Yü tso t'ou. Illustrations of the modern manufacture of jade. Jade as a mineral. Methods of working jade. Worked jade. Bibliography (pp. 257–260)--volume 2. Catalog: Brief introduction, with explanatory statement as to the arrangement. Mineralogical synopsis. Archaeological synopsis. Ancient or tomb pieces from China. Art objects, historical period.

In 2000, an eBay user attempted to fraudulently auction set #100 which was in the possession of The Philadelphia Rare Books and Manuscripts Company. The same set was sold at auction by Christie's in November 2007 for HKD 3,487,500.

=== Other collections ===
Heber Bishop also donated a large collection of Alaskan antiquities to the American Museum of Natural History in 1879. He also collected, with the assistance of Major John Wesley Powell, a large collection of British Columbian ethnological artifacts, including the famous Haida canoe, which is 64 feet long, 8 feet wide and was hollowed out of a single tree trunk by the Heiltsuk tribe, formerly known as the Bella Bella tribe opposite Haida Gwaii.

Brayton Ives, a New York financier, made a collection of rare and historical swords. When he ceased collecting, the swords were sold, and through the efforts of Mr. Bishop, William Thompson Walters and the American Art Association, the valuable sword collection, valued at $15,000, was donated to the Metropolitan Museum of Art as well.

== Personal life ==
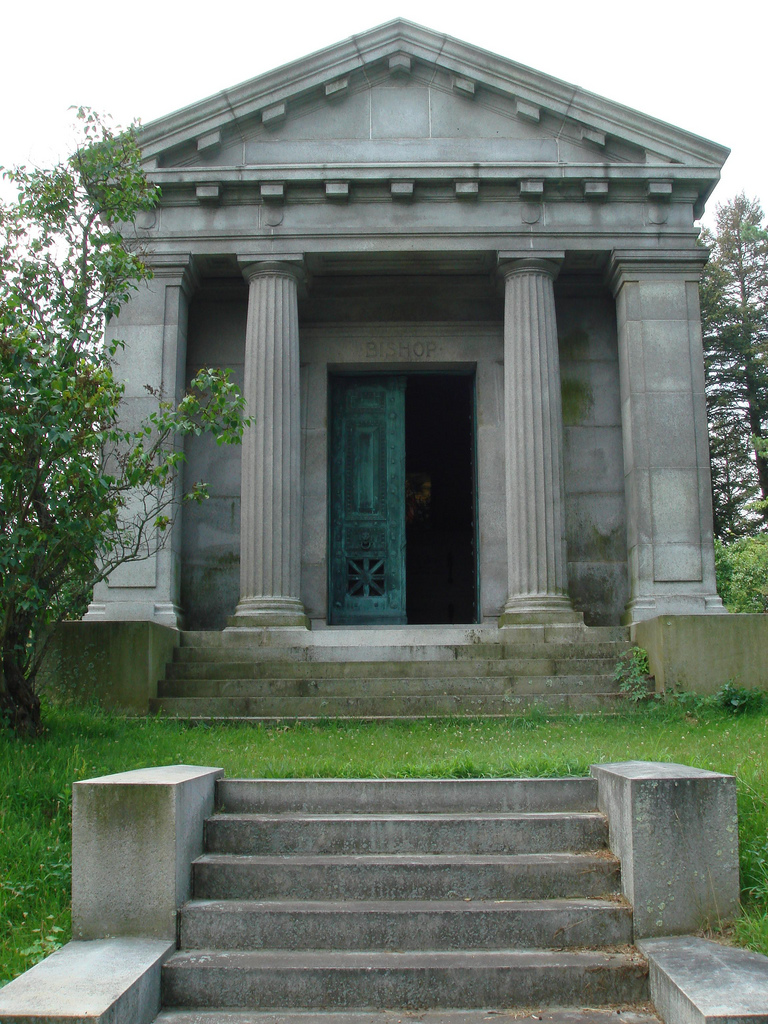
Bishop Mausoleum, Sleepy Hollow Cemetery

He married Mary Cunningham (1842–1905), the second daughter of Elizabeth Griffiths (1809–1869) and Scottish born James C. Cunningham (1801–1870), who was a mechanical engineer and ship owner of Irvington, New York. Cunningham operated successively in New York, Boston, and, starting in 1850, San Francisco, where he operated his steam ship Senator, developed Cunningham's Wharf and was involved in the early development the city. Her sister, Jane Templeton Cunningham (1832–1888), was married to Darius Ogden Mills (1825–1910). Their daughter, Elisabeth Mills, married Ambassador Whitelaw Reid, and their son, Ogden Mills (1856–1929), was a prominent financier.

Together, Heber and Mary had eight children:

- Mary Cunningham Bishop (1864–1948), who died unmarried.
- Elizabeth Templeton Bishop (1865–1934), who married James Low Harriman (1856–1928), eldest son of Oliver Harriman
- Harriet Arnold Bishop (1866–1931), who married James Franklin Doughty Lanier (1858–1928), grandson of James Lanier.
- Heber Reginald Bishop Jr. (1868–1923), who married Mabel Wolverton Sard (1871–1923), who was previously married to Arthur Amory Jr. (1867–1898)
- James Cunningham Bishop (1870–1932), who married Abigail Adams Hancock (1872–1949), niece of Winfield Scott Hancock, and had five daughters.
- Francis Cunningham Bishop (1872–1927),, co-owner of Newcastle Stable, who married Gertrude Sophia Pell (d. 1953) in 1906, and had three sons.
- Edith Bishop (1874–1959), who married Moses Taylor V (1871–1928), grandson of Moses Taylor, in 1896. After his death, she married George James Guthrie Nicholson (1871–1950).
- Ogden Mills Bishop (1878–1955)

Bishop died on December 10, 1902, at his residence, 881 Fifth Avenue, after a long illness. Bishop, his wife, and several of their children are interred in the Bishop mausoleum at Sleepy Hollow Cemetery, Sleepy Hollow, New York. It sits next to the Cunningham mausoleum erected by his wife's father, and a short distance from the Darius Ogden Mills and Whitelaw Reid mausoleums.

His estate, valued at approximately $3,500,000, was left in trust for his widow, children, sisters, and brother. He left funds to the Metropolitan Museum for the preservation of his collection. By 1915, his estate's holdings in Standard Oil had increased in value by $1,450,000.

=== Society life ===
Mary's brother-in-law, Darius Ogden Mills, was instrumental in introducing the Bishops to elite New York business and society circles. For example, Heber and his children Mary, Harriet, and Ogden were members of Ward McAllister's "Four Hundred" list, reportedly the number of people who could fit into Mrs. Astor's ballroom. His daughter Harriet's home, the James F. D. Lanier Residence, is a New York landmark. His daughter Edith and her husband owned many residences, including Annandale Farm in Mt. Kisco, NY, Glen Farm in Portsmouth, RI, and the Villa Taylor in Marrakesh, Morocco, where Winston Churchill and Franklin Delano Roosevelt "played hookey" during World War II.

The Taylors would cruise to Morocco aboard their 310-foot steam yacht Iolanda. In 1898, Bishop and his wife gave a red domino dance for 150 at their residence in New York.

An 1895 watercolor on ivory portrait of the four daughters is held by the New York Historical Society. He was a member of the Metropolitan Club, the Union Club, the Union League Club, the New York Yacht Club, the City Club, the Turf and Field Club, the Century Association, the New England Society, the Mendelssohn Glee Club, the Chicago Club of Chicago, the Golf Club of Newport, the Turf Club of Newport, the American Hackney Horse Society of New York, the Boone and Crockett Club and the Civil Service Reform Association.

In 1899, Bishop rented Houghton Hall in England, where he hosted the Prince of Wales for a weekend of hunting.
