= Vancouver Public Library =

Public library system in British Columbia

Coordinates: 49°16′47″N 123°6′56″W

- Location: Vancouver, British Columbia, Canada
- Established: 1869
- Architect: Moshe Safdie / DA Architects + Planners
- Branches: 21

Collection
- Items collected: business directories, phone books, maps, government publications, books, periodicals, genealogy, local history
- Size: 9.5 million (physical and digital)

Access and use
- Circulation: 10.4 million
- Population served: 675,000 (2024)
- Members: 236,068 (2023)

Other information
- Budget: $59,331,613 (2023)
- Employees: 900
- Website: www.vpl.ca

Vancouver Public Library (VPL) is the public library system for the city of Vancouver, British Columbia. In 2023, VPL had more than 4.6 million visits with patrons borrowing nearly 10.4 million items including: books, ebooks, CDs, DVDs, video games, newspapers and magazines. Across 21 locations and online, VPL serves over 236,000 active members and is the largest public library system in British Columbia.

== Services ==
The Vancouver Public Library includes a large collection of books and digital content. The library provides community information, programs for children, youth, and adults, and delivery to homebound individuals. In addition, the library also provides access to information and reference services, text databases, and interlibrary loan services.

=== One Book, One Vancouver ===
One Book, One Vancouver was a citywide book club sponsored by the Vancouver Public Library. Titles were selected by the library staff, who voted on one of four titles presented by the One Book, One Vancouver Organizing Committee. It was discontinued after 2010.

- 2002: The Jade Peony – Wayson Choy
- 2003: Stanley Park – Timothy Taylor
- 2004: The Corporation: The Pathological Pursuit of Profit and Power – Joel Bakan
- 2005: Obasan – Joy Kogawa
- 2006: There is a Season: A Memoir in a Garden – Patrick Lane
- 2007: My Year of Meats – Ruth Ozeki
- 2008: The Five Books of Moses Lapinsky – Aren X. Tulchinsky
- 2009: The Crazy Canucks: Canada's Legendary Ski Team – Janet Love Morrison
- 2009: The Farm Team – Linda Bailey
- 2010: The Hitchhiker's Guide to the Galaxy – Douglas Adams

== History ==
In January 1869, the manager of the Hastings Mill, J.A. Raymur, started the New London Mechanics Institute, a meeting room and library for mill employees. In March 1869, it was renamed the Hastings Literary Institute, in honour of Rear Admiral the Honourable George Fowler Hastings. No official records of the Hastings Literary Institute have survived, but it is known that membership was by subscription. The Hastings Literary Institute continued to exist until the Granville area was incorporated as part of the new City of Vancouver on 6 April 1886.

Following the Great Vancouver Fire on 13 June 1886, 400 books from the now-defunct Hastings Literary Institute were donated to the newly established Vancouver Reading Room. In December 1887, the Reading Room opened at 144 West Cordova Street, above the Thomas Dunn and Company hardware store. It was also known as the Vancouver Free Library and the Vancouver Free Reading Room and Library.

By the late 1890s, the Free Reading Room and Library in the YMCA Building on West Hastings had become overcrowded. During this period, the American industrialist and philanthropist Andrew Carnegie was giving money to cities and towns to build libraries. In 1901, the City of Vancouver approached Carnegie about donating money for a new library to replace the space in the YMCA Building.

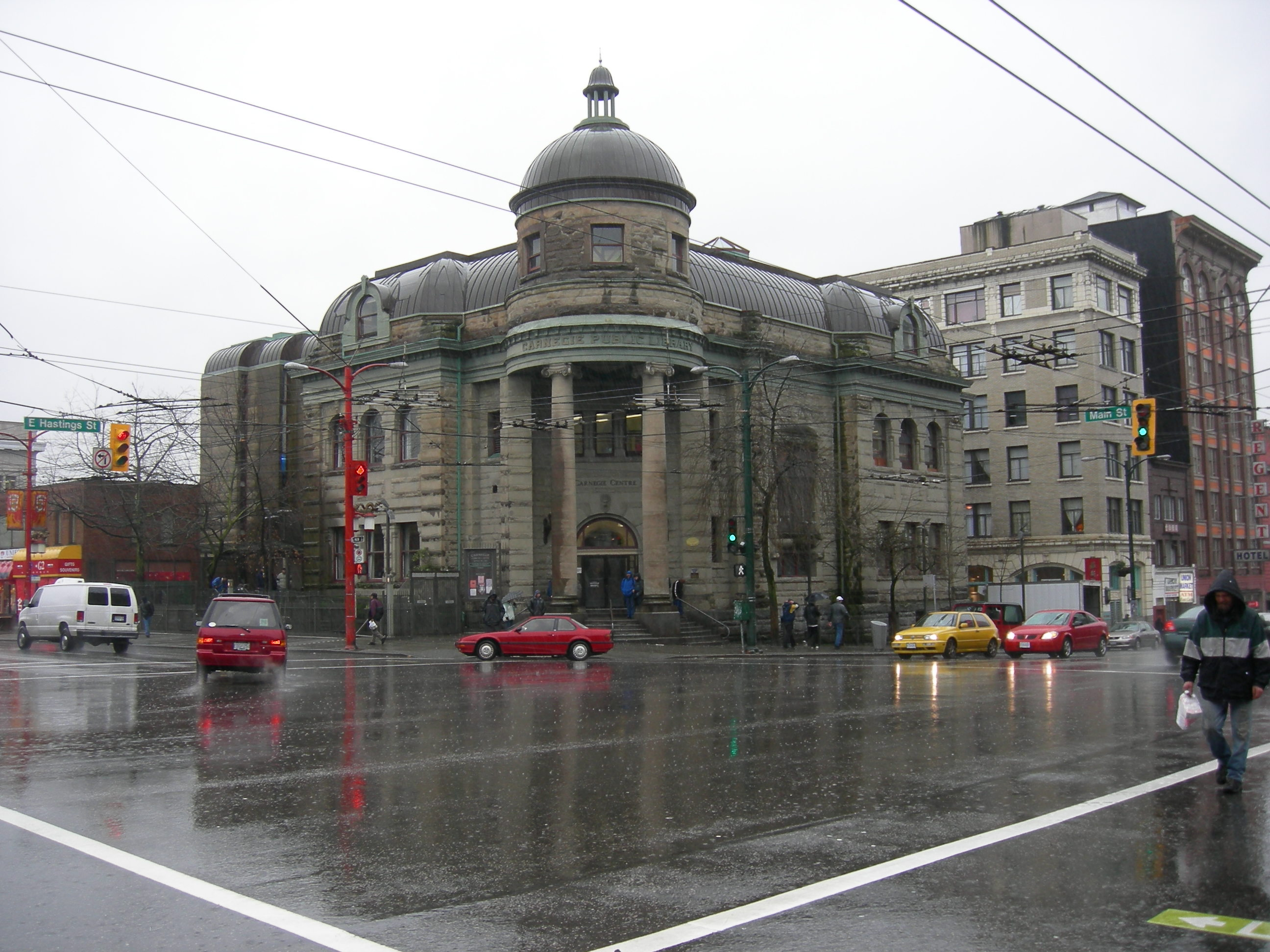
The Vancouver Carnegie Library was completed in 1903. The building was used as the main branch of the public library until 1957. The Carnegie Branch is currently located in the building.

In 1901, American steel magnate, Andrew Carnegie agreed to donate $50,000 to build a city library if Vancouver would provide free land and $5,000 annually to support its operation. A fight immediately developed between East and West side Vancouver as to who would get the new cultural institution. A public plebiscite fixed the site at Hastings and Westminster (now Main) Streets, next door to the first City Hall. The cornerstone was laid by the Grand Lodge of the Masonic Order on 29 March 1902 and under it were placed Masonic documents, a copy of the city's Act of Incorporation, lists of various officials and examples of the postage stamps and coins then in use. The building was designed by Vancouver architect George Grant and is in the style of Romanesque Renaissance, with a domed Ionic portico and French mansard roof. Granite for the foundation came from Indian Arm and sandstone for the 10" thick walls came from Gabriola Island. A fantastic marble, spiral staircase was built by Albion Iron Works of Victoria. It cost $2.279 million and 9,888 pounds of steel and iron were used. A large multi-panel stained glass window with 3 smaller windows below was designed and crafted by N.T. Lyon of Toronto. Depicted in the windows are John Milton, William Shakespeare, Robert Burns, Sir Walter Scott, Sir Thomas More, and Edmund Spenser. The 3 small windows were removed in 1958 when the library was converted into the museum. They were missing for many years but were located intact and returned to the building in 1985. Inside was hardwood panelled walls and ceilings and oak floors. The rooms were heated by eight fireplaces. There were special reading rooms for ladies and for children, a chess room, newspaper reading room, picture gallery, lecture hall, and on the third floor the Art, Historical and Scientific Association (now called the Vancouver Museum). The library opened in November 1903. This branch is now primarily used as a community centre for residents of the Downtown East Side neighbourhood.

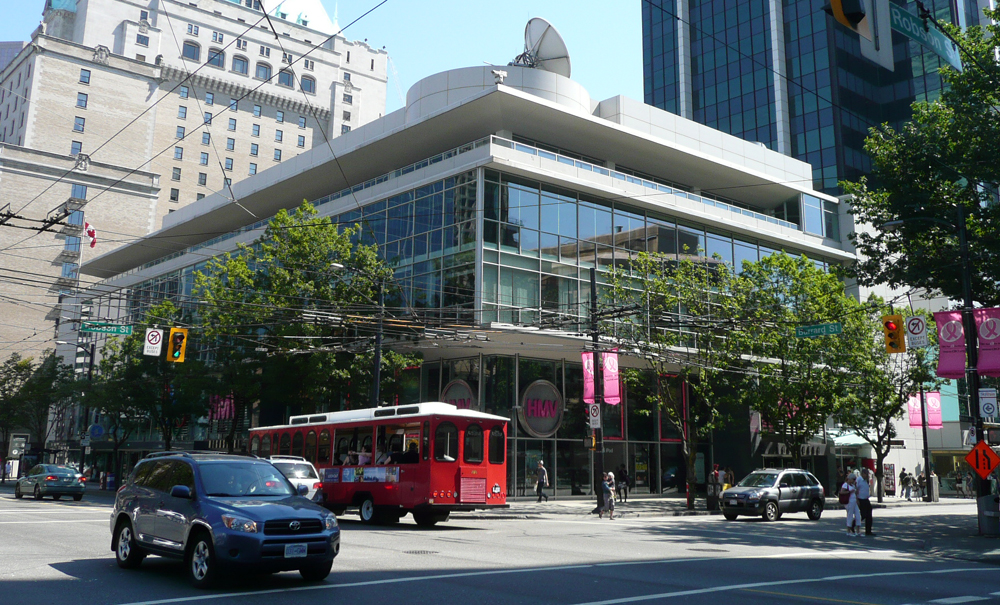
VPL moved its Central branch location from the Carnegie Library to 750 Burrard Street in 1957. The building was used as the Central branch until 1995.

The Vancouver Public Library continued to occupy the Hastings and Main site until the opening of a new central library at 750 Burrard Street in 1957. The move from the Carnegie site to the new location at 750 Burrard began in mid-October 1957, and the official opening of the new library was held on 1 November 1957. The library remained at the Burrard building until 22 April 1995, when it closed in preparation for the move to a new location at Library Square (350 West Georgia Street). The central branch opened in Downtown Vancouver on 26 May 1995 and cost CAD $106.8 million to build.

In September 2009, the library cancelled a room booking made by the group Exit International to hold a workshop by Philip Nitschke about assisted suicide. The cancellation came despite months of negotiation between Exit and library administration. The library stated that it had received a legal opinion stating the workshop as described could contravene Canada's Criminal Code, but would not make the opinion public. The workshop was held at Vancouver's Unitarian Church. "Whatever the reasons of the library were, it's obviously not affecting the decision by the Unitarian Church," Dr. Nitschke said. David Eby, executive director of the BC Civil Liberties Association, which failed to get the ban lifted, said "Usually, librarians are our closest allies in this free-speech debate."

=== City librarians ===
- George Pollay (1887–1890)
- James Edwin Machin (1892–1910)
- Alfred E. Goodman (1910)
- Robert Waite Douglas, city librarian (1911–1924)
- Edgar Stewart Robinson, director (1924–1957)
- Peter Grossman, director (1957–1969)
- Morton P. Jordan, director (1970–1978)
- George C. Wootton, director (1979–1983)
- Aileen Tufts, director (1984–1987)
- Madge Aalto, director (1988–2003)
- Paul Whitney, city librarian (2003–2010)
- Sandra Singh, chief librarian (2010–2018)
- Christina de Castell, chief librarian (2018–2025)
- Ben Hyman, chief librarian & CEO (2025–present)

== Branches ==
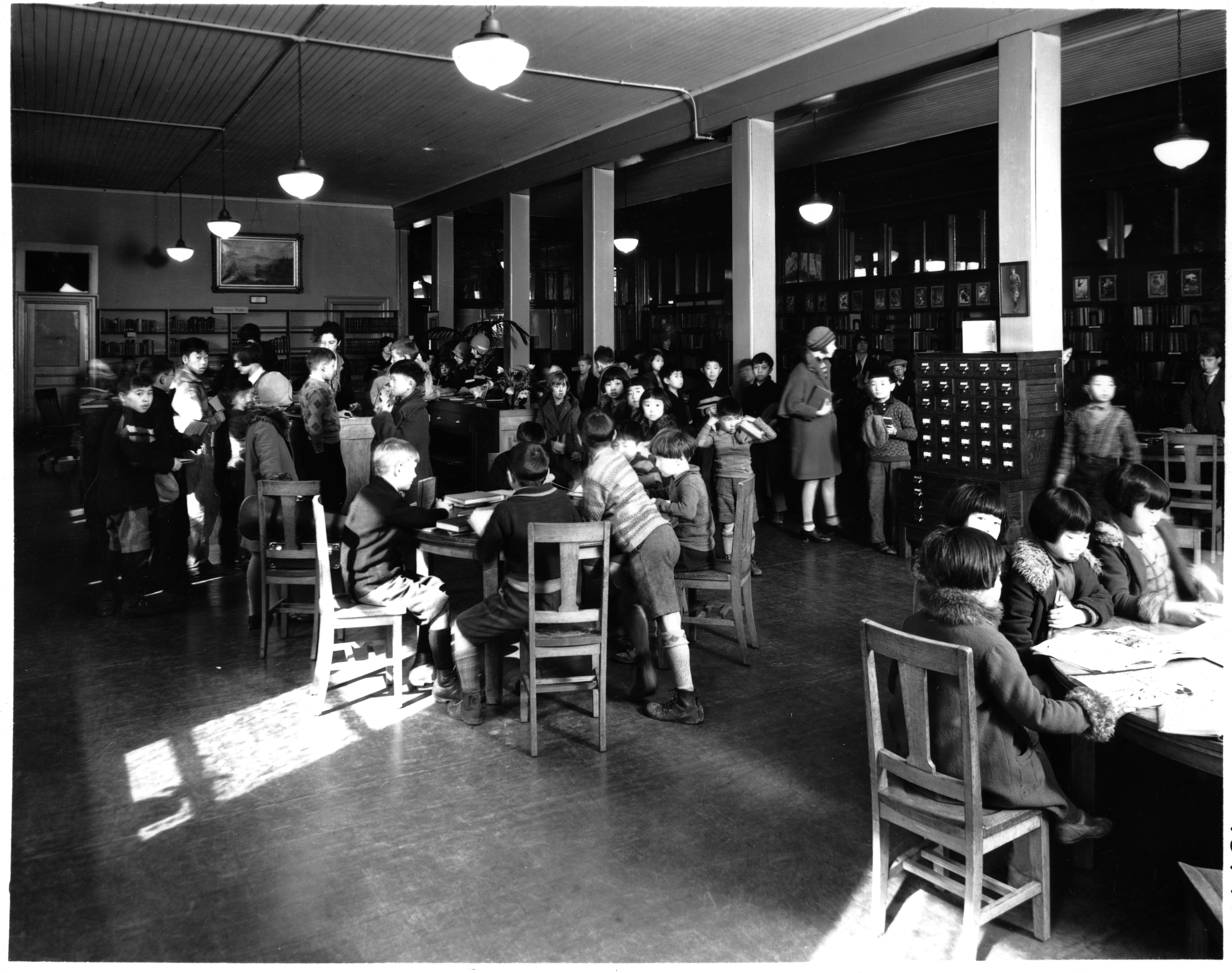
Children at Kitsilano Branch Library, opened in 1927

In 1927, the first permanent branch was opened in Kitsilano (2375 West Fourth Avenue). Sixteen years later, in 1943, the second branch, Kerrisdale (Forty-second Avenue and West Boulevard), came into service. Other branches followed throughout the years, with the last branch, the Terry Salman Branch, opening in 2011. The Strathcona Branch, which shared its collection and facilities with Lord Strathcona Elementary School, was removed from the system in 2016, pending the opening of the nə́c̓aʔmat ct Strathcona Branch. The new branch opened in the same community in 2017.

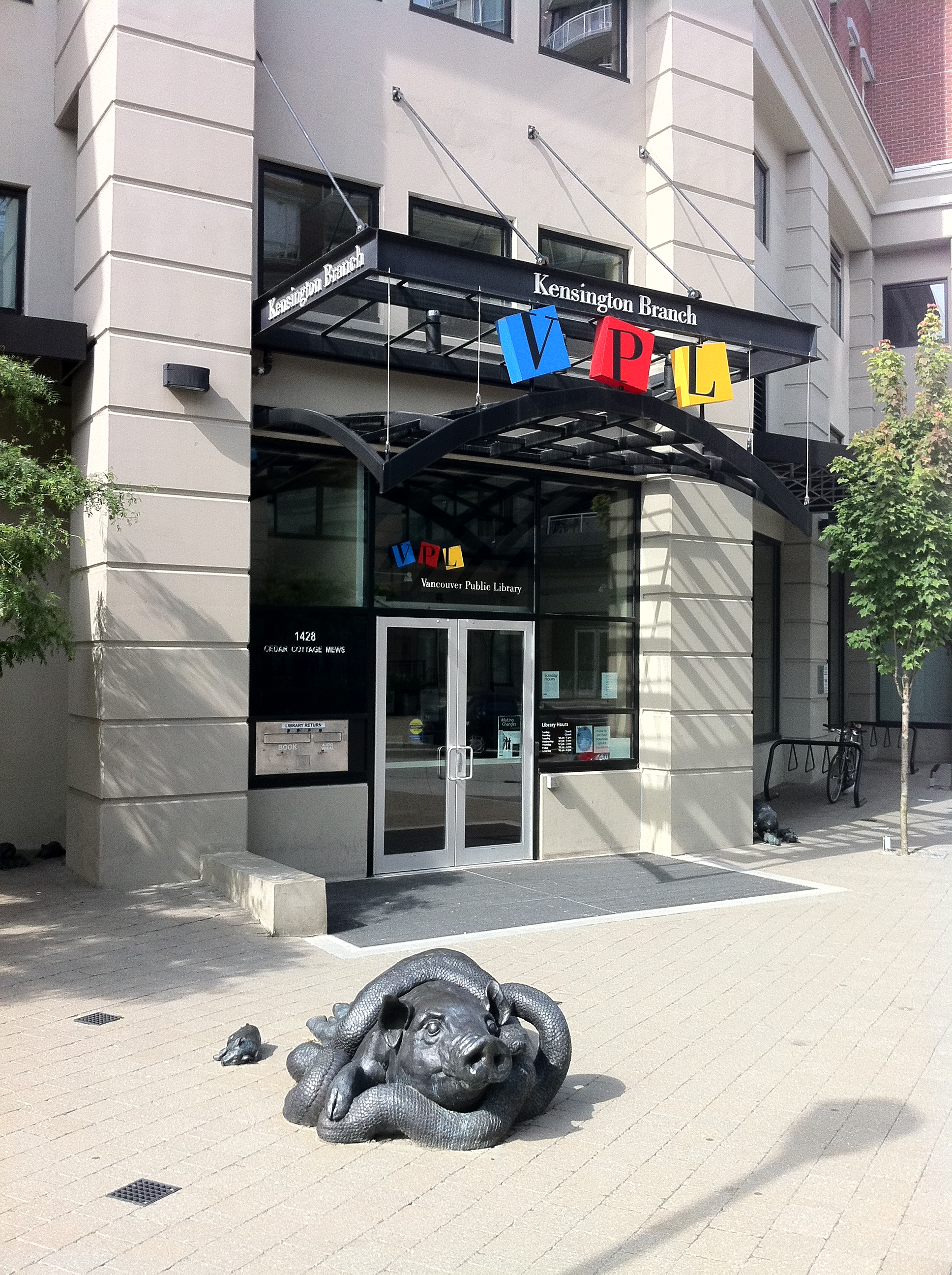
Entrance to the Kensington branch. Kensington is one of 21 VPL branches.

The Vancouver Public Library system now consists of 21 branches situated throughout the city. The administration centre, and also the largest branch, known as the Central Branch, is located at Library Square in downtown Vancouver.

=== Central Library ===
The Library Square facility consolidates the Vancouver Public Library's Central Library, a federal office tower, and retail and service facilities. It occupies a city block in Downtown Vancouver. Centred on the block, the library is a nine-story rectangular box containing book stacks and services, surrounded by a free-standing, elliptical, colonnaded wall featuring reading and study areas that are accessed by bridges spanning skylit light wells. The building is located in the eastern portion of the Vancouver Central Business District. The address of the library is 350 West Georgia Street. Levels 8 and 9 were previously leased to the provincial government.

The VPL Central Library internal glass facade overlooks an enclosed concourse formed by a second elliptical wall that defines the east side of the site. This glass-roofed concourse serves as an entry foyer to the library and the more lively pedestrian activities at ground level. Public spaces surrounding the library form a continuous piazza with parking located below grade. The building's exterior resembles the current appearance of the Colosseum in Rome.

Adjacent to the Central Library is Library Square, a public square is bordered by Robson Street, Homer Street, West Georgia Street, and Hamilton Street. Across Homer street is the Centre in Vancouver for the Performing Arts (formerly The Ford Centre for the Performing Arts), designed by Moshe Safdie as a complementary building to Library Square. The Library Square project was the largest capital project ever undertaken by the City of Vancouver. The decision to carry out the project came after a favourable public referendum in November 1990. The city then held a design competition to choose a design for the new building. The design by Safdie and DA Architects was by far the most radical design and yet was the public favourite. 70% of the public liked the Safdie scheme as a "unique, imaginative, exciting, interesting building." The inclusion of the 21-storey office tower in the design was required in order to pay for the project and as part of a deal with the federal government to obtain the land; the federal government has a long-term lease on the high rise office tower portion of the project. Construction began in early 1993 and was completed in 1995. In the year following the new library's opening, library visits increased by 800,000.

In addition to its function as the central branch of the city's public library system, the one-square block project includes an attached office high-rise, retail shops, restaurants, and underground public parking. The library building has a rooftop garden designed by Vancouver landscape architect Cornelia Oberlander. The roof garden is accessible by the public. The new 740-square-metre (8,000 sq ft) rooftop garden and the expansion to Level 9 were built at a cost of CA$15.5 million; they opened to the public in September 2018. The expansion is LEED Gold CIv1 certified, managed by Light House Sustainable Building Centre.

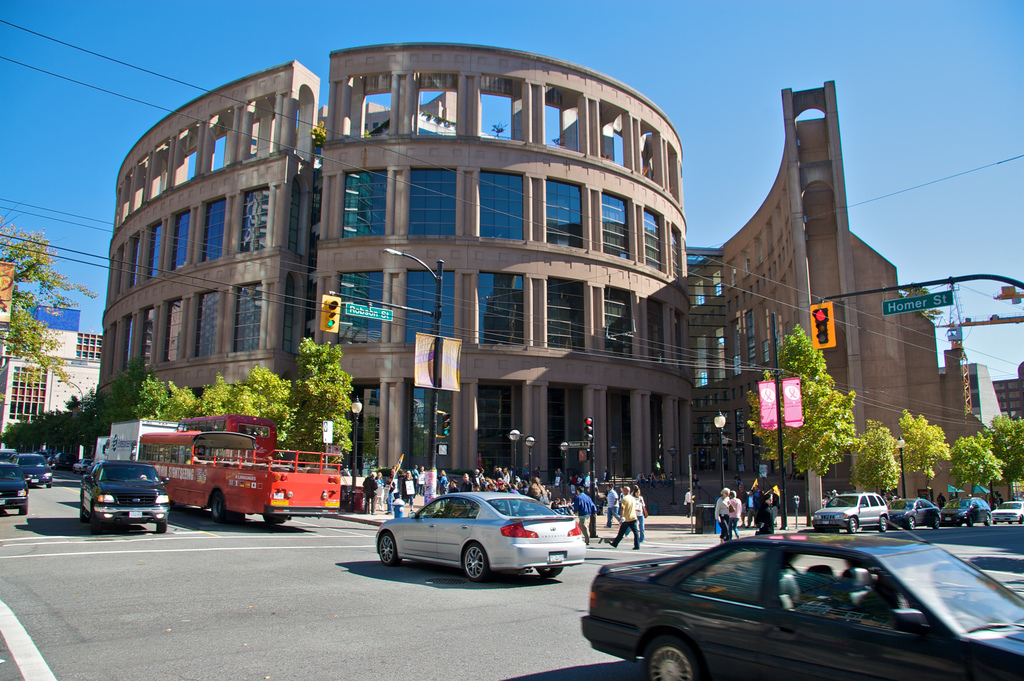
The Central Library of Vancouver Public Library is located in Downtown Vancouver.

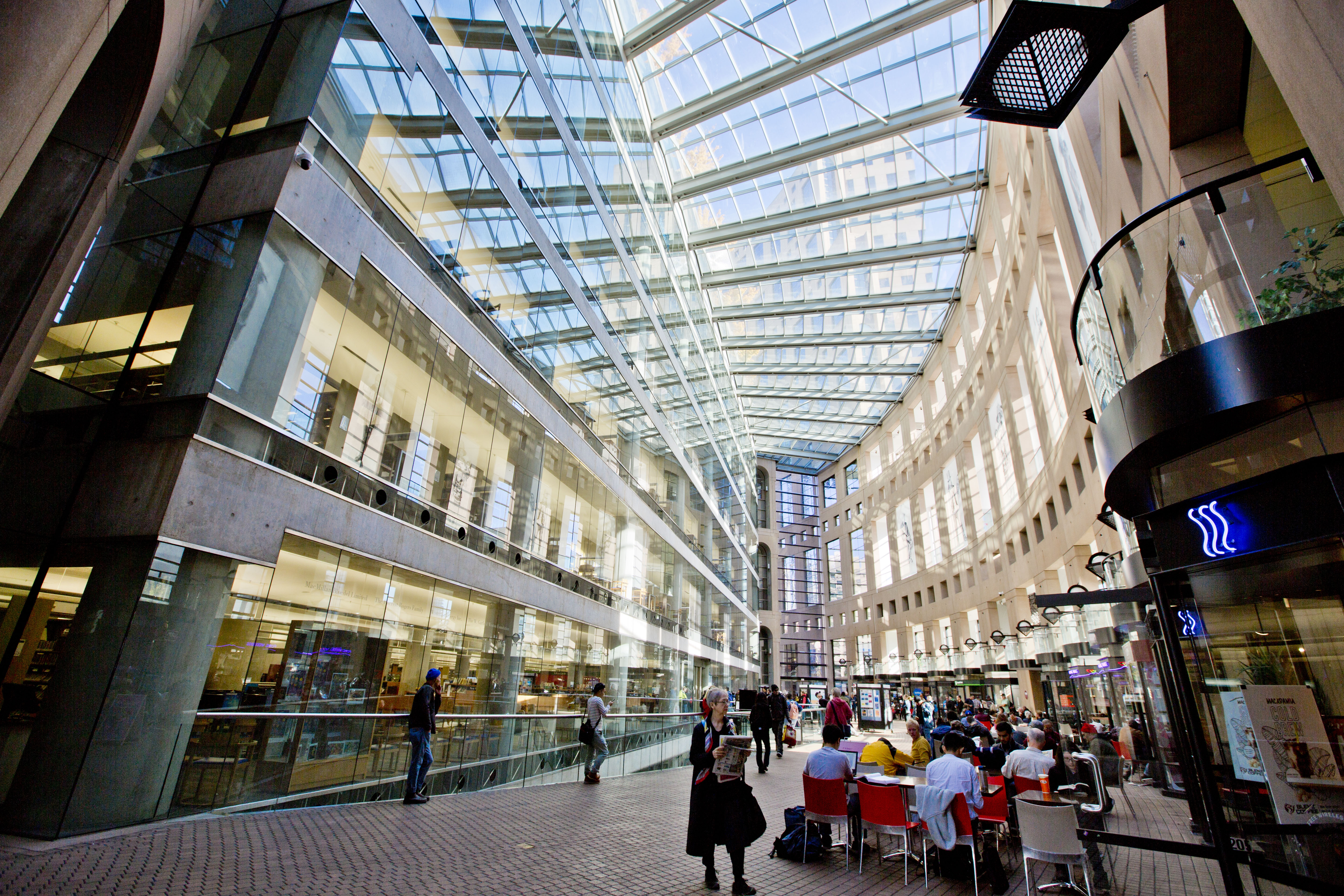
VPL Central Library internal glass facade overlooks an enclosed concourse formed by an elliptical wall

==== Statistics ====
Library building (including retail and parking)

- 9 stories
- 37,000 square metres (400,000 sq ft)
- 1.3 million books, periodicals, and other reference materials are moved through the building by vertical and horizontal conveyors
- 51 kilometres (32 mi) of cables are laid throughout the building, including a fibre optic backbone
- Seating capacity: 1,200+
- 700+ parking stalls and a few bicycle racks
- Top two floors were leased by the Government of British Columbia until 2015 and are now part of the library. They include meeting space, study space, roof garden and exhibition space.
- Approximate cost: CA$107 million

==== Image gallery ====
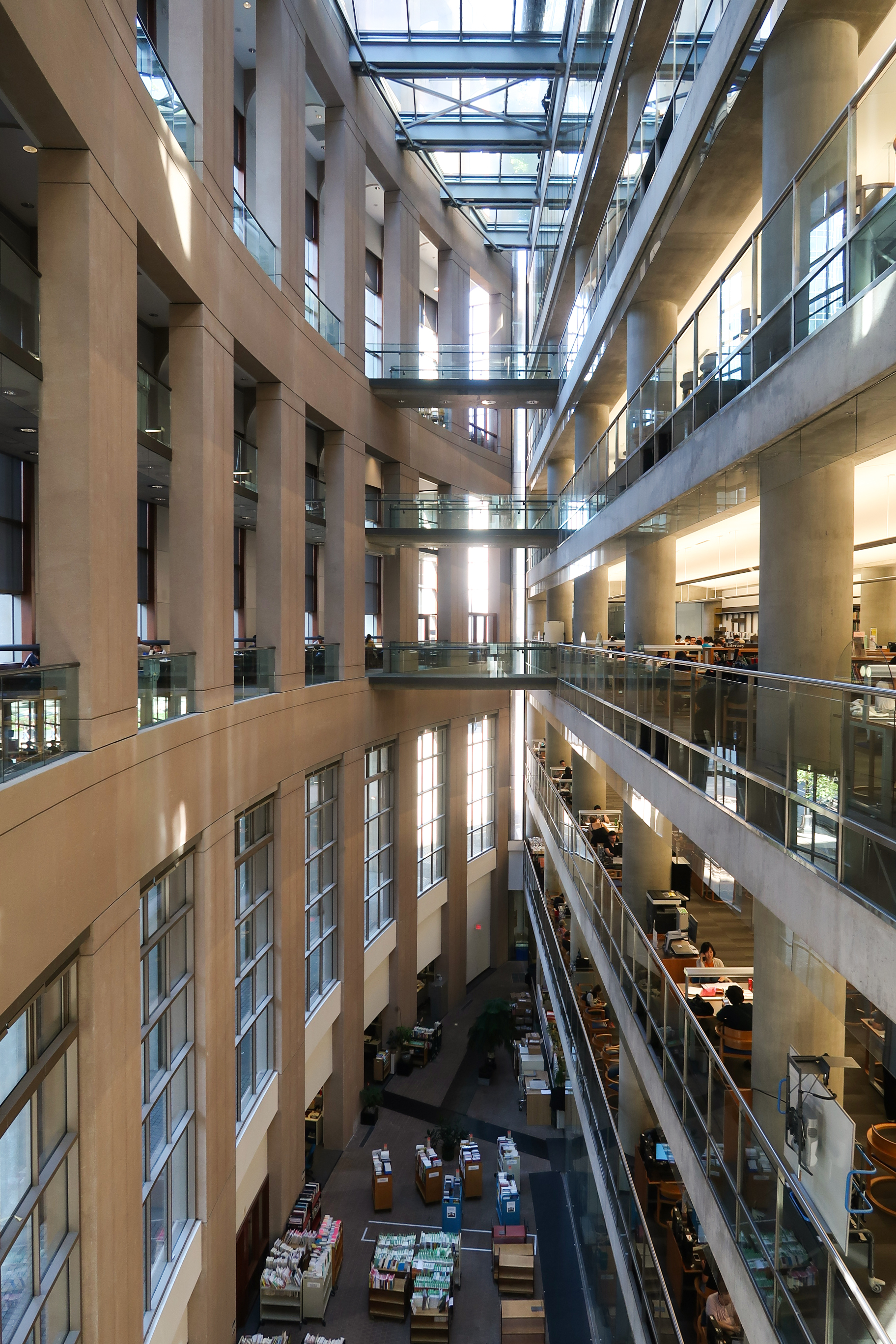
Overview of library interior

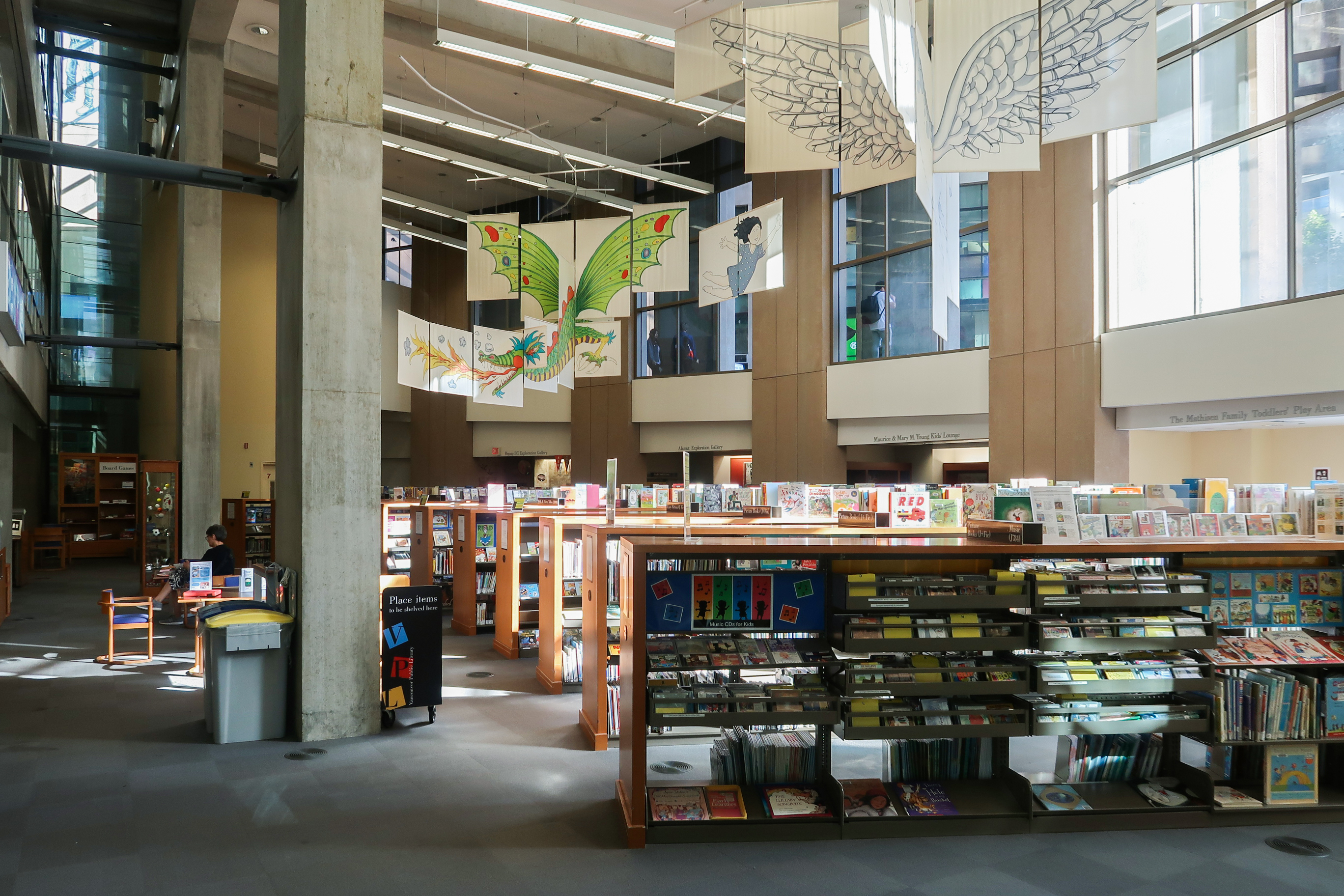
Level 1 (Children's Library)

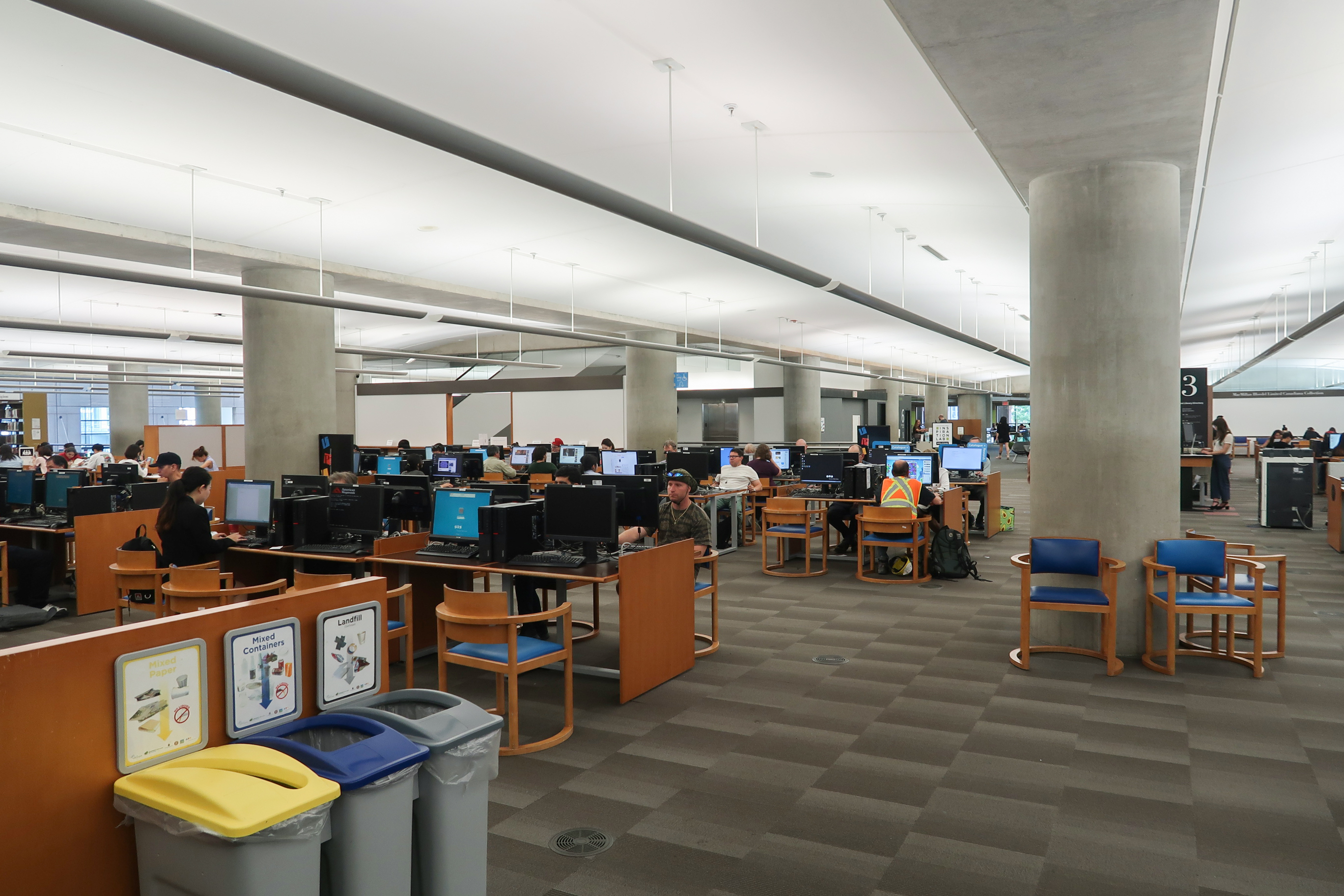
Level 3 (Computer Lab)

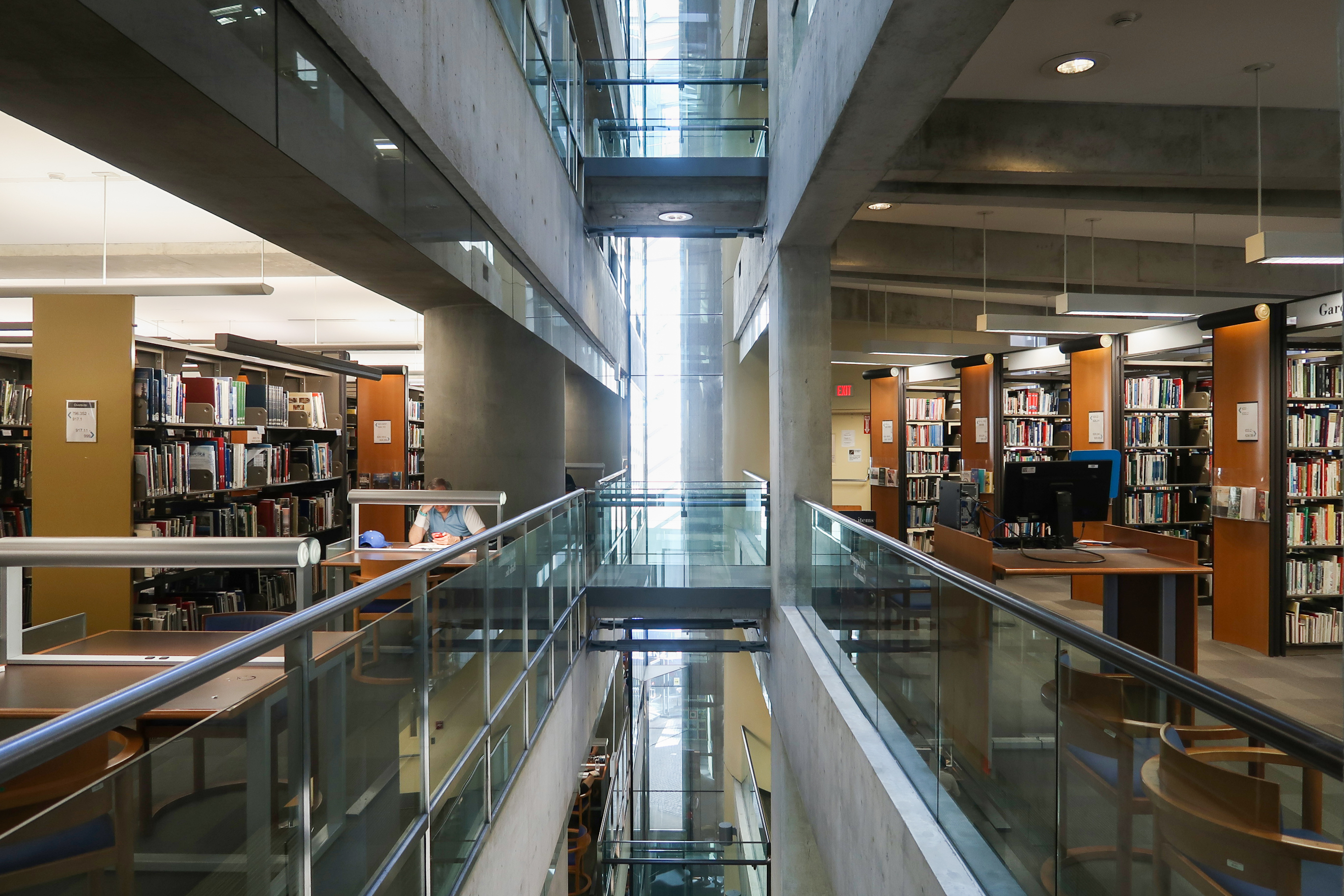
Level 4 (Oversize Collection, Audio & Video Collection)

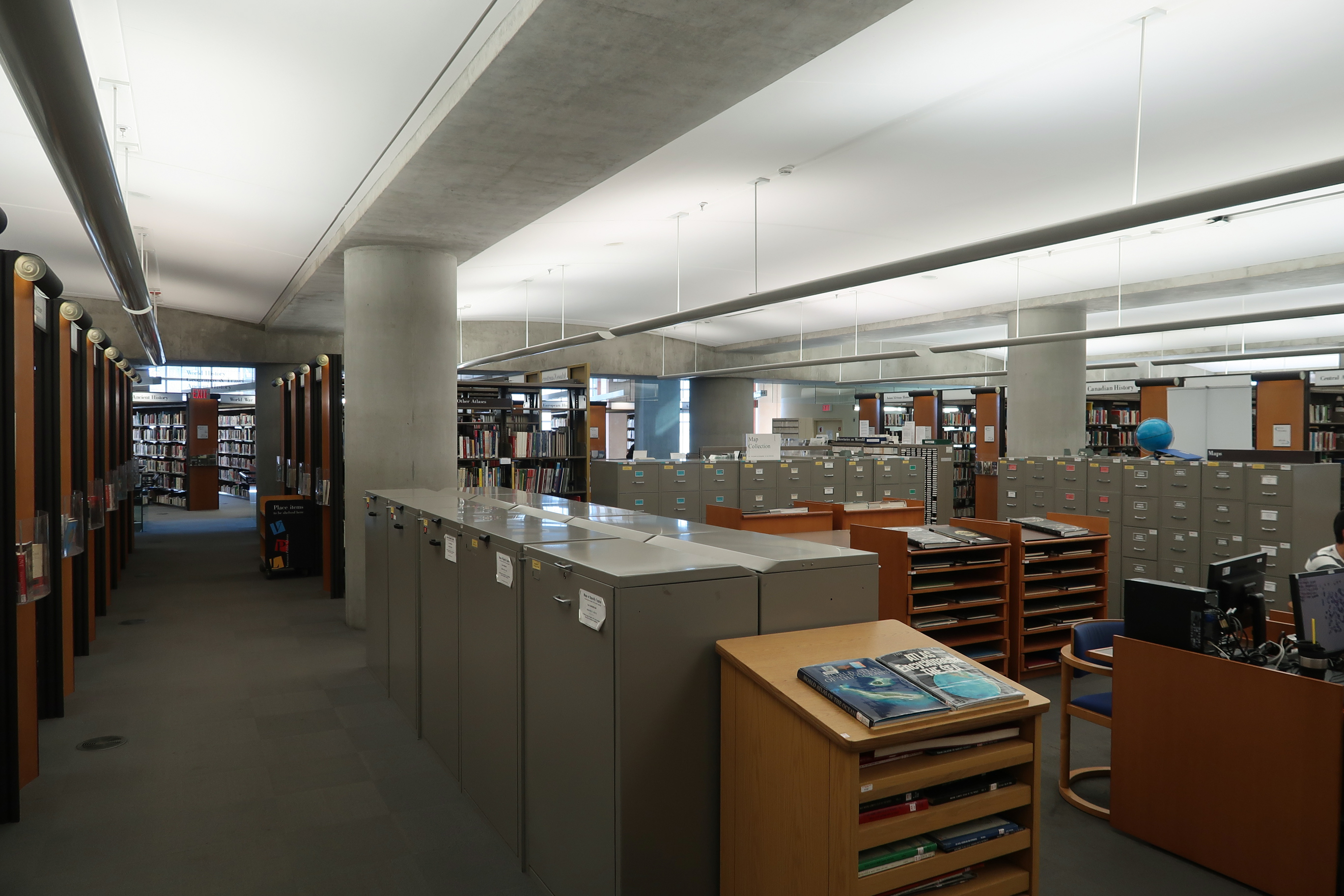
Level 6 (History Section)

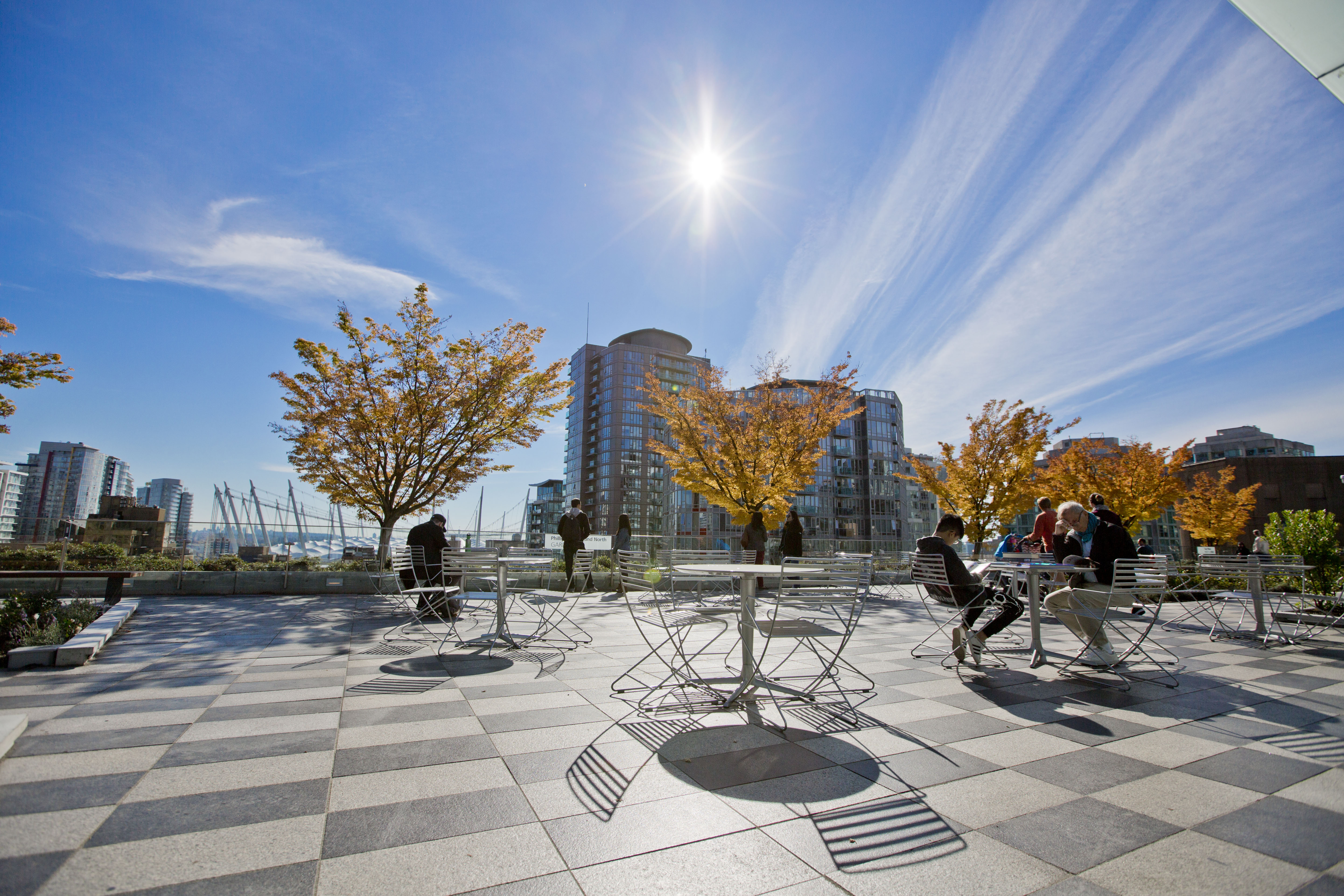
Roof garden

== See also ==
- List of Carnegie libraries in Canada
