= Robert Waite Douglas =

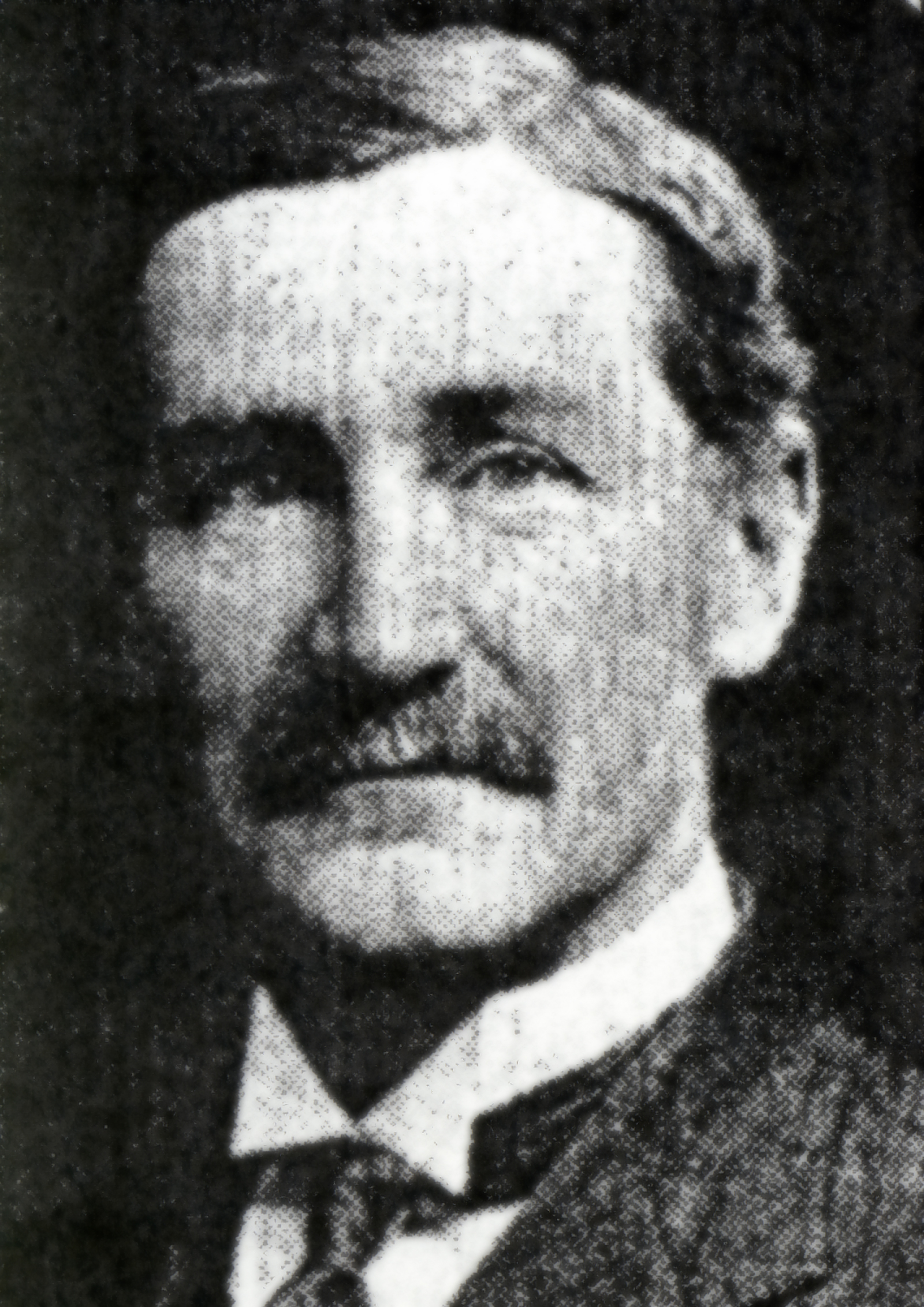
- Robert Waite Douglas circa 1920
- Born: July 15, 1854; New Durham, Canada West
- Died: January 9, 1931 (aged 76); Los Angeles, California, US
- Resting place: San Gabriel Cemetery, San Gabriel, California, U.S.
- Occupations: Editor, librarian

Robert Waite Douglas (July 15, 1854 – January 9, 1931), known professionally as R. W. Douglas, was a Canadian librarian, bibliophile, editor, literary agent, author, and public speaker who served as Vancouver, British Columbia's chief librarian from 1911 to 1924 and as the first president of the British Columbia Library Association. Under his direction, the Vancouver Public Library grew greatly in size, its circulation increased and a number of rare books were added to its collection as he worked to make the Vancouver Library one of the "finest libraries on the continent."

== Early life ==
Douglas was born in 1854 in New Durham, Ontario, the son of Alex and Elizabeth Douglas. He developed a love for reading at a young age. After he had consumed the available reading material at his family's home, he spent his spare time hunting muskrats for pelts which he sold to buy books.

He received a high school education in nearby Brant, Ontario. Intending to matriculate at the University of Toronto, Douglas pursued further coursework under private tutors.

In 1874, Douglas married Williamina Whyman, whose family had recently emigrated from Kent, England. Williamina died 2 years later, leaving Douglas with 2 young daughters to care for. In 1877, Douglas married Williamina's half-sister, Eleanor Sara Follett. Together, they had 4 more daughters and 1 son.

== Career ==
=== Bookseller ===
Instead of continuing his education at the University of Toronto as planned, Douglas took a position with a bookseller in Toronto, Ontario.

Alfred Piddington, owner of one of the largest book establishments in Toronto, hired Douglas to manage his bookstore. In 1883, Piddington sold his business to Douglas, who created the company R. W. Douglas and Co. Douglas became a noted bookseller in Toronto. Specializing in "rare and curious books, stationery, fancy goods, and toys," his inventory included approximately 75,000 books including works in "every department of literature." His bibliography of Canadian books, Bibliotheca Canadensis, which was circulated in the United States, was used by dealers in old and rare books.

Around 1889, Douglas sold his business to Risser & Company. Following an extended trip to England, Douglas moved to New York City to join Brentano's bookshop. As a Brentano's representative, he travelled extensively and visited hundreds of libraries in the United States and Canada.

=== Author ===
While in Toronto, Douglas began contributing stories to magazines and papers, such as The Canadian Monthly. He was awarded a prize for the best short story submission to Truth magazine.

In 1921, Douglas wrote to author L. M. Montgomery, commending her for "visualizing the soul of the Canadian people in the war" and for accurately portraying the "storm and stress of home life during those anxious days" in her recent book, Rilla of Ingleside. Montgomery noted in her journal that Douglas’ comments pleased her and were the "first competent testimony" that she had been successful in capturing the essence of that time period in her book.

A member of the British Columbia section of the Canadian Authors Association, Douglas served as vice-chairman.

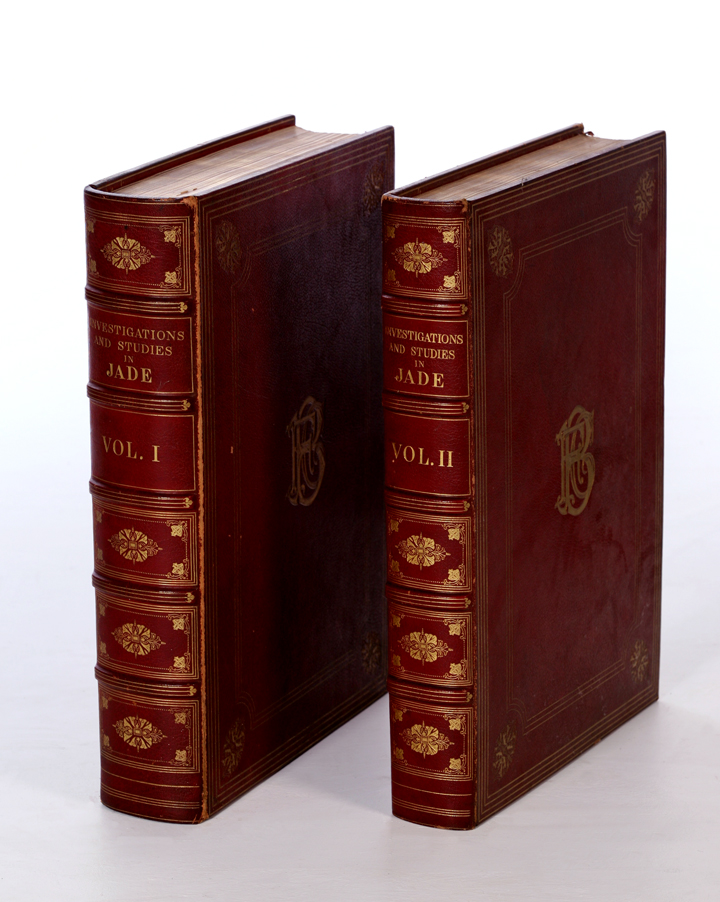
Investigations and Studies in Jade

=== Editor ===
Douglas became a literary adviser to the New Amsterdam Book Company, a large New York City publishing house. He was appointed editor of their series of books published under the name Commonwealth Library and he contributed an introduction to each volume. The Commonwealth Library books were offered at a low price and were designed to be carried "in the pocket."

In 1901, Douglas' Love Songs of Scotland was published. Designed as a companion volume to Albert Lamartine's Love Songs from France, it contained works selected and edited by Douglas from Burns, Tannahil, Scott, Ramsay and others.

After the death of Heber R. Bishop in 1902, Douglas assisted in editing Bishop's partially completed Investigations and Studies in Jade, a two-volume set which documented Bishop's extensive jade collection that had been donated to New York's Metropolitan Museum of Art. Douglas spent 3 years completing the work. Of the 100 copies printed, Douglas helped secure 3 copies for Canadian institutions: the Toronto Public Library, the University of Toronto, and McGill University in Montreal.

=== Literary Agent ===
Douglas later became an agent for E.P. Dutton & Company and Little, Brown & Company, American publishing firms.

=== Librarian ===
In 1911, Douglas accepted the position of City Librarian at the Vancouver Public Library (then Carnegie Library) in Vancouver, British Columbia. Shortly after his arrival, he established a children's reading room and initiated Saturday readings in the park for children. Four branch libraries were opened in June 1912. By 1914, an additional five branches had been opened.

With the approval of the library's board, Douglas returned to the East Coast in 1913 to purchase several thousand rare, "unusual," and valuable books as well as artwork for the library. Douglas also donated 250 books from his personal collection. Under his direction, the library grew in size and its circulation continued to increase.

Toward the end of his career, Douglas faced criticism from the board for his management of the library. Douglas contended that American libraries received more funds per capita than were allocated by the board to the Vancouver Public Library. Douglas submitted his letter of resignation in 1924.

==== Public Speaker ====
As chief librarian, Douglas was a frequent lecturer on literary topics. In 1911, Douglas addressed the convention of the Pacific Northwest Library Association on the topic of "Book Selection for Public Libraries."

In 1913, Douglas delivered an address, which was subsequently published, to benefit St. Paul's Hospital, entitled "How Books May Help You."

To foster the love of good literature within the Vancouver community and to help provide a means to enjoy it, Douglas offered free weekly lectures at the library on a wide range of poets and writers.

==== British Columbia Library Association ====
In September 1911, the British Columbia Library Association was founded by Douglas and several of his colleagues. The association's purpose was to advocate for the passage of public library legislation and the extension of library services throughout the province. Douglas served as its first president. The British Columbia Library Association was the driving force behind the passage of British Columbia's 1919 Act for the Establishment and Maintenance of Public Libraries.

== Death ==
Douglas died in Los Angeles, California on January 9, 1931, and is buried with his wife, Eleanor, at San Gabriel Cemetery, in San Gabriel, California.
