= Francis R. Appleton =

American lawyer (1854–1929)

Francis Randall Appleton
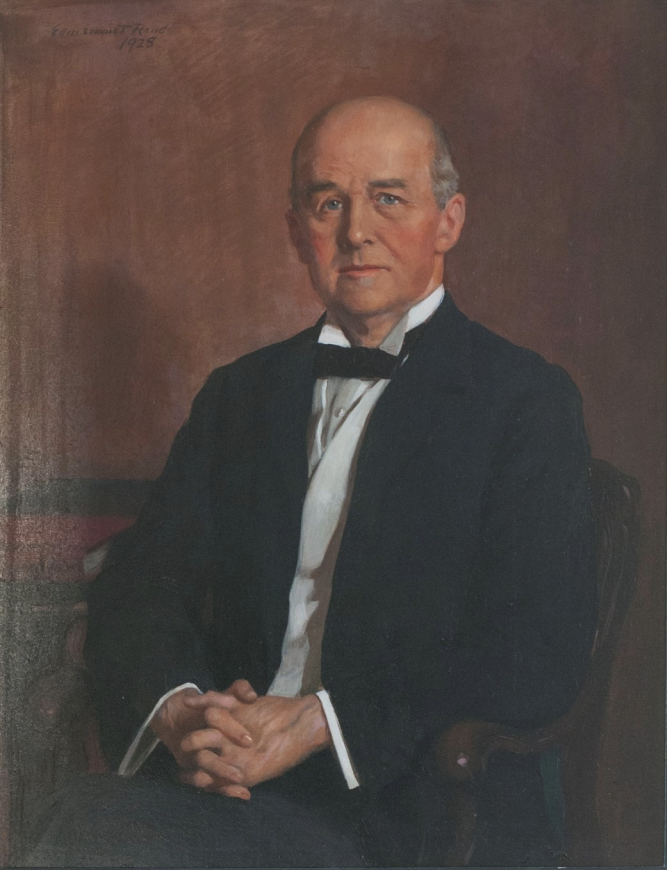
- Francis R. Appleton painted by Ellen Emmet Rand in 1925
- Born: August 5, 1854; Lenox, United States
- Died: January 2, 1929 (aged 74); Ipswich, Massachusetts, United States
- Education: Harvard College; Columbia Law School
- Spouse: Fanny Lanier (m. 1884)
- Children: 5
- Relatives: James Appleton (grandfather)

Francis Randall Appleton (August 5, 1854 – January 2, 1929) was an American lawyer and prominent New York society man during the Gilded Age.

== Early life ==
Francis Randall Appleton was born on August 5, 1854, in Lenox, Massachusetts. He was the eldest son born to Daniel Fuller Appleton (1826–1904), and Julia Randall (1827–1886). His siblings included Randolph Morgan Appleton (1862–1940), and James Waldingfield Appleton (1867–1942). After his mother's death in 1886, his father married Susan Cowles, daughter of the Rev. John P. Cowles, in 1889.

His paternal grandfather was Brig. Gen. James Appleton (1785–1862), an abolitionist, early supporter of temperance, and politician from Maine. His maternal grandfather was Nicholas P. Randall.

He was educated at private schools and prepared for college at Phillips Academy in Andover, Massachusetts. He graduated from Harvard College in 1875, and Columbia Law School in 1877.

== Career ==
In 1877, he was admitted to the bar in New York. Following his admission to the Bar, he practiced as a lawyer for several years in New York City. From 1884 until his retirement in 1910, he was a member of the firm of Robbins & Appleton, which was founded by his father and were the New York agents for the Waltham Watch Company.

=== Society life ===
Francis and his wife were included on Ward McAllister's list of New York's social elite during the Gilded Age, known as "Four Hundred", purported to be an index of New York's best families, published in The New York Times

Appleton owned a home in New York, that he used during the Winter, and a home in Ipswich, which he used in the summer. The Ipswich home, Appleton Farms, was owned and operated by the Appleton family continuously since its founding in 1638. He was a member of the Society of Colonial Wars, and was an overseer of Harvard College during 1903–1909. He was a member of the Republican Party and served as president of the Harvard Club of New York from 1916 to 1919.

== Personal life ==
On October 7, 1884, Appleton was married to Fanny Lanier (1864–1958), in Lenox, Mass. She was a daughter of Sarah Egleston and Charles D. Lanier (1837–1926), a close friend of Pierpont Morgan. She was a granddaughter of banker James Lanier and a great-granddaughter of Major General John Paterson who was on George Washington's staff during the American Revolutionary War. Together, they were the parents of five children:

- Francis Randall Appleton, Jr. (1885–1974), who married Joan Mary Egleston (1912–2006) in 1935.
- Charles Lanier Appleton (1886–1921), who died unmarried.
- Ruth Appleton (1891–1943), who married William Greenough Wendell (1888–1967) in 1914. They divorced in 1938.
- Alice A. Appleton (1894–1987), who married Clarence Leonard Hay (1884–1969), son of U.S. Secretary of State John Hay, in 1914. His sister, Helen Hay, was married to Payne Whitney in 1902.
- James Appleton (1899–1915), who died young after a long illness.

Appleton died on January 2, 1929. His widow died 29 years later in 1958.
