= Winslow, Lanier & Co. =

Defunct New York–based investment firm

Winslow, Lanier & Co. was a New York–based investment firm founded by Indiana financier James Franklin Doughty Lanier and Richard Winslow in 1849. It was an early source of financing of railways in the United States, selling railroad securities to private investors in the United States and Europe. In the 1880s, the firm operated under the stewardship of J. F. D. Lanier's youngest son Charles D. Lanier (1837-1926), a close friend of Pierpont Morgan with whom he joined on numerous railroad financings such as the Chicago, Burlington and Quincy Railroad in 1877, the Columbus, Hocking Valley & Toledo Railway in 1881 and the Saint Paul and Pacific Railroad in 1884. One of its largest financings was a $40 million bond offering for the New York Central in 1880, co-managed with Drexel, Morgan & Co. and August Belmont & Co. In the 1880s, the firm also provided financing to Thomas Edison's development of the electric light.
