= John R. Cravens =

American politician

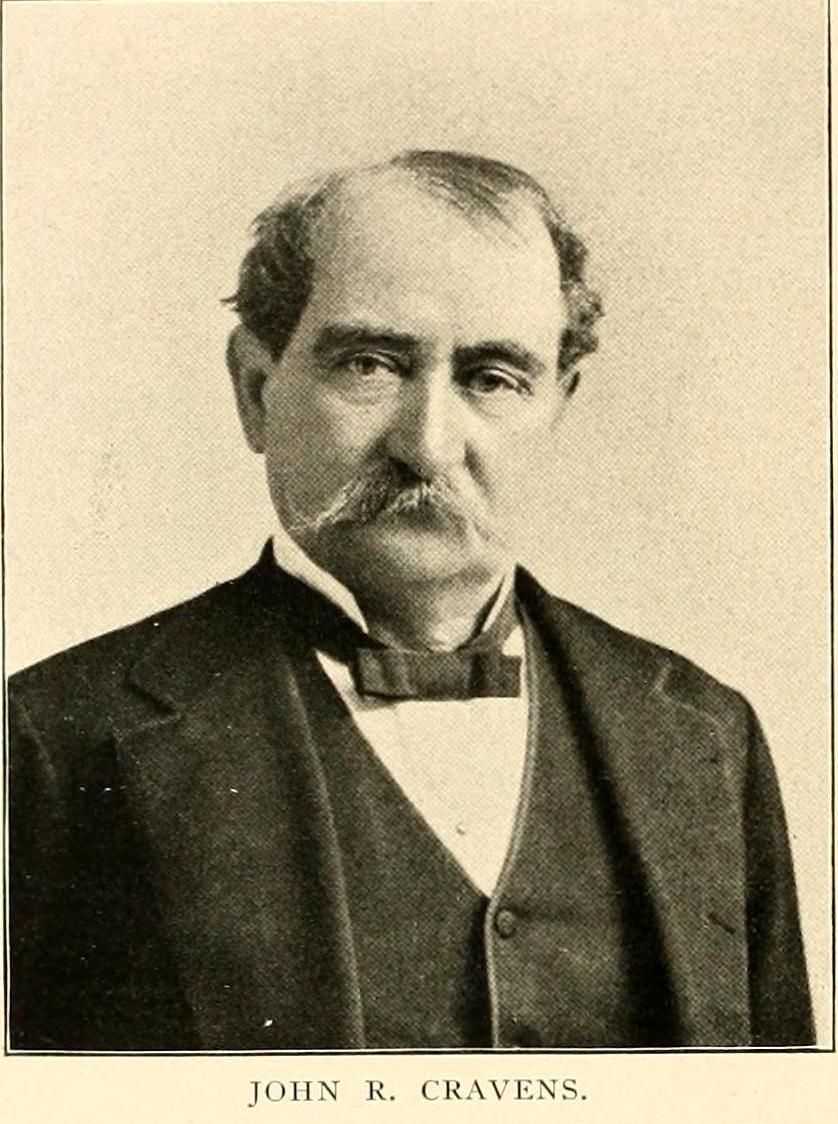

Lieutenant Governor of Indiana
- In office January 16, 1861 – October 9, 1863
- Governor: Oliver P. Morton
- Preceded by: Oliver P. Morton
- Succeeded by: Paris C. Dunning

Personal details
- Born: November 22, 1819 Madison, Indiana, U.S.
- Died: March 26, 1899 (aged 79) Madison, Indiana, U.S.
- Party: Republican
- Education: Indiana University (BA) & (MA)

Military service
- Allegiance: United States
- Branch/service: Union Army
- Battles/wars: American Civil War

John Robert Cravens (1819–1899) was a politician from the U.S. state of Indiana. Between 1861 and 1863 he served as acting Lieutenant Governor of Indiana.

== Early life and education ==
John Robert Cravens was born November 22, 1819, in Madison, Indiana, the son of Robert and Sarah Grover Paul Cravens. His maternal grandfather John Paul founded the city of Madison, Indiana. Cravens graduated from Indiana University in 1840 with a bachelor's degree and obtained a master's degree at an unknown date. He read law in Madison in the office of Joseph G. Marshall.

== Marriage and family ==
Cravens married Drusilla Lanier on February 1, 1844. They had 12 children with 11 of the children living to adulthood. The children were John, Robert, James, Alexander, William, Elizabeth, Joseph, Mary, Drusilla, Margaret (died in infancy), and Franklin.

== Career ==
Cravens was involved in milling with W. W. Page Sr. for several years until their investments burned to the ground. He was then elected president of the Madison & Indianapolis Railway Company and the Shelbyville & Columbus railway. Cravens remained in the office until the companies were reorganized, and he voluntarily retired. He then served for a short time as an editor and proprietor of the "Madison Banner", a Whig newspaper.

Cravens served in the Indiana Senate from 1854 to 1862 and 1866 to 1870. He was the Presiding Officer, Senate President Pro Tempore from 1860 to 1862 in the Indiana Senate. In 1861 Governor Henry S. Lane resigned from his office to accept a seat in the U.S. Senate. His Lieutenant Governor Oliver P. Morton followed him as new Governor of Indiana. According to the state constitution the now vacant position of the Lieutenant Governor was filled by the President Pro Tempore of the State Senate, John Cravens. He served in this position between January 16, 1861, and October 9, 1863, when he resigned. Afterwards he served as an officer in the Union Army during the last years of the American Civil War.

Cravens also served in Madison, Indiana, as a school trustee for a number of terms and was a trustee of the State University and Hanover College.

== Death ==
Cravens died on March 26, 1899, at his home, Fairmount, in Madison, Indiana.

Political offices
Preceded by Oliver P. Morton	Lieutenant Governor of Indiana; 1861–1863	Succeeded by Paris C. Dunning
