= Émile-Jean Sulpis =

French engraver and designer

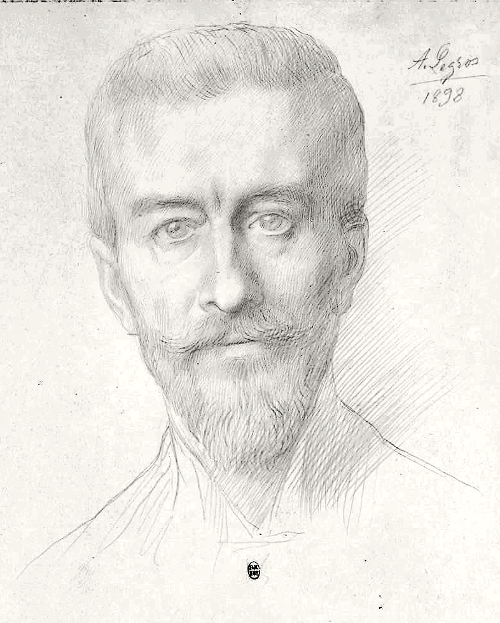
Émile-Jean Sulpis, by Alphonse Legros (1898)

Émile-Jean Sulpis (22 May 1856, Paris - 31 December 1942, Paris) was a French engraver and designer.

== Biography ==
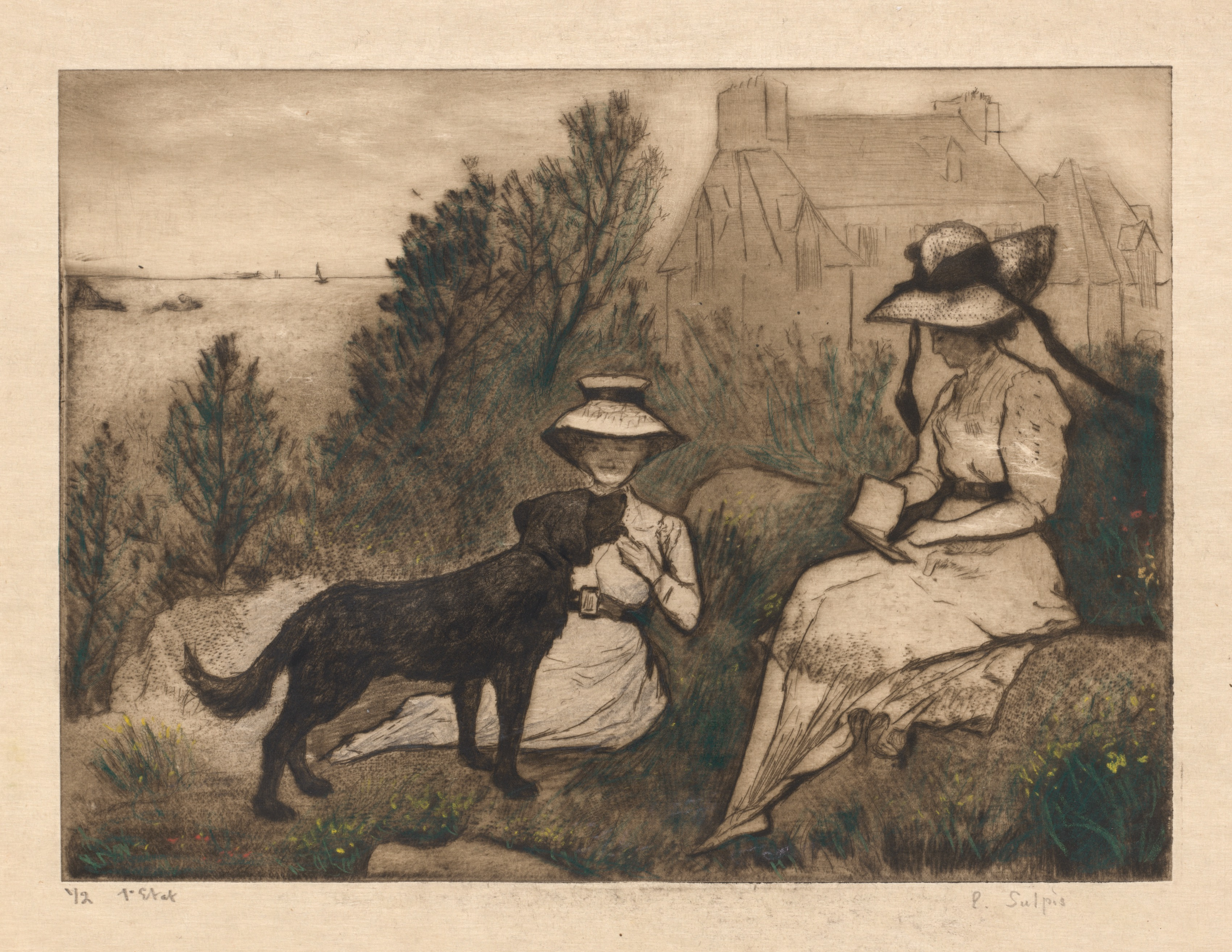
In the Garden

His father was the architectural engraver, Jean-Joseph Sulpis, with whom he is often confused. After studies at home, he entered the École Estienne, where his primary instructors were Alexandre Cabanel and Louis-Pierre Henriquel-Dupont. He would later become a teacher there.

His first showing was at the Salon in 1880. He would be a regular exhibitor there, and was awarded a first-class medal in 1894. Meanwhile, he won the Prix de Rome in 1884, and was at the Villa Medici from 1885 to 1888.

He obtained the Grand Prize at the Exposition Universelle in 1900. That same year, he was named a Knight in the Legion of Honor. In 1908, he participated in the Franco-British Exhibition in London, where he presented "Wisdom Overcoming the Vices", after a painting by Andrea Mantegna in the Louvre. Although he did original work, during his lifetime he was primarily known for his interpretations of the Renaissance masters who, in addition to Mantegna, included Dürer, Michelangelo, Jan van Eyck and Bruegel (the Elder).

In 1911, he retired from his position at the École Etienne, and was replaced by Mathurin Méheut, professor of watercolors at the École Boulle. Shortly after, he was elected to the Académie des Beaux-Arts, where he took Seat #1 for engraving, succeeding Léopold Flameng (deceased). He would occupy that seat for thirty-one years, until his own death at the age of eighty-six.

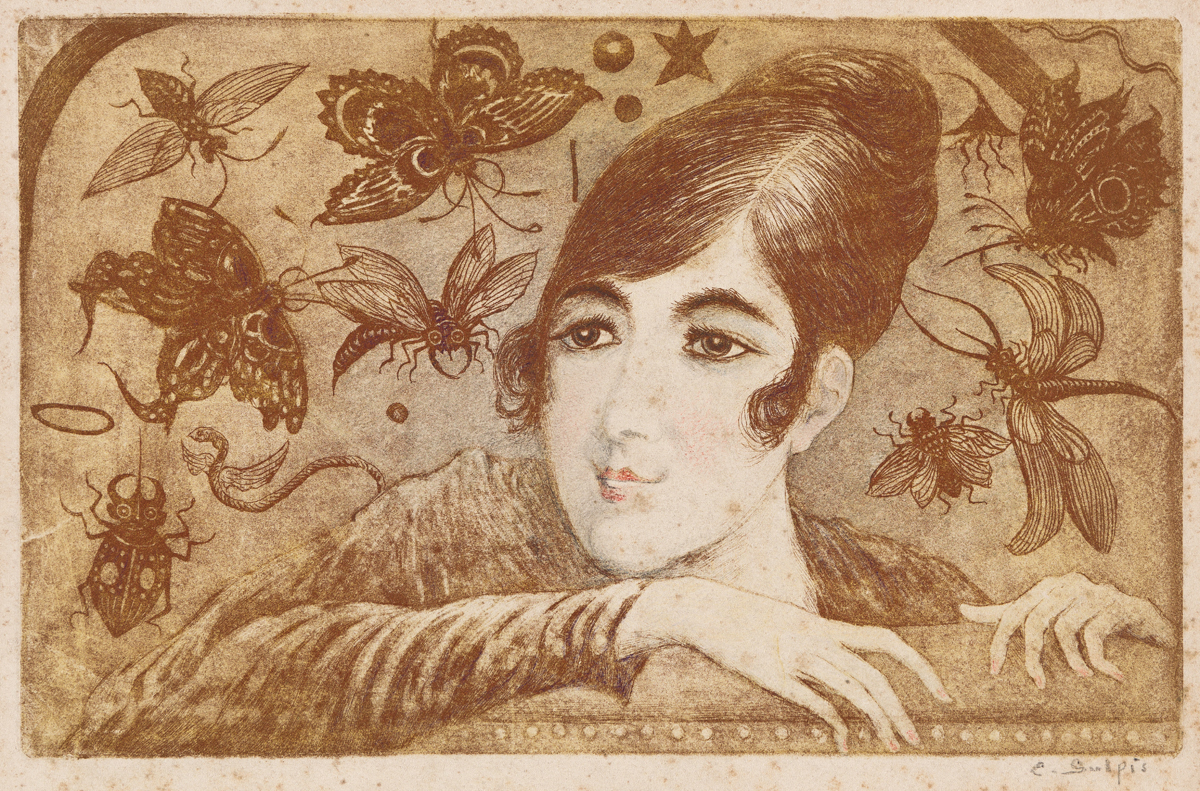
Untitled, from a collection of etchings featuring women
