= Ferncliff =

Ferncliff may refer to one of the following places in the United States:

- Ferncliff, Bainbridge Island, Washington
- Ferncliff Camp & Conference Center, a Presbyterian facility located in Pulaski County, Arkansas
- Ferncliff Cemetery
- Ferncliff Farm, formerly an estate of the Astor family
- Ferncliff Forest, a nature preserve that was once part of the Astor family's Ferncliff Farm estate
- Ferncliff Peninsula Natural Area
