= Susan Ridgway Willing =

American socialite

Susan Ridgway Willing Lawrance
- Born: Susan Ridgway Willing; August 2, 1865; Newport, Rhode Island, U.S.
- Died: May 2, 1933 (aged 67); Paris, France
- Spouse: Francis Cooper Lawrance Jr. (m. 1899; died 1904)
- Children: Frances Alice Willing Lawrance, Princess Poniatowski
- Relatives: John Rhea Barton Willing (brother); Ava Lowle Willing (sister); Vincent Astor (nephew); Ava Alice Muriel Astor (niece); John Rhea Barton (grandfather); Charles Lanier Lawrance (stepson)

Susan Ridgway Willing Lawrance (August 2, 1865 – May 2, 1933) was an American socialite who was prominent in New York society during the Gilded Age.

== Early life ==
Willing was born on August 2, 1865, in Newport, Rhode Island. She was the eldest child of Edward Shippen Willing (1822–1906) and Alice Caroline (née Barton) Willing (1833–1903). Her siblings included John Rhea Barton Willing, who did not marry, and Ava Lowle Willing, who was married to John Jacob Astor IV until their divorce in 1910, and, thereafter, to Thomas Lister, 4th Baron Ribblesdale.

Her maternal grandfather was the wealthy Dr. John Rhea Barton, an orthopedic surgeon best remembered for describing Barton's fracture. Her maternal grandmother, Ann Fries (née Frazer) Barton, died in 1837 and his grandfather remarried to Willing's namesake, heiress Susanna Ridgway Rotch, the daughter of merchant Jacob Ridgway. Her grand-uncle, Dr. William P.C. Barton, was also a renowned doctor and surgeon. Willing's father, the son of Richard Willing, was the paternal grandson of Thomas Willing, who served as Mayor of Philadelphia and the first president of First Bank of the United States, and the great-grandson of Charles Willing, also a Mayor of Philadelphia.

== Society life ==
Ava Lowel Willing and Susan Ridgway Willing, married to Frank Cooper Lawrance Jr., 1899

In 1892, Willing, along with her brother Barton and sister Ava, was included in Ward McAllister's "Four Hundred", purported to be an index of New York's best families, published in The New York Times. Willing and her siblings inherited the approximately $1,000,000 estate left by her father upon his death in 1906. Upon her unmarried brother's death in 1913, Susan and her sister Ava inherited the bulk of his estate.

== Personal life ==
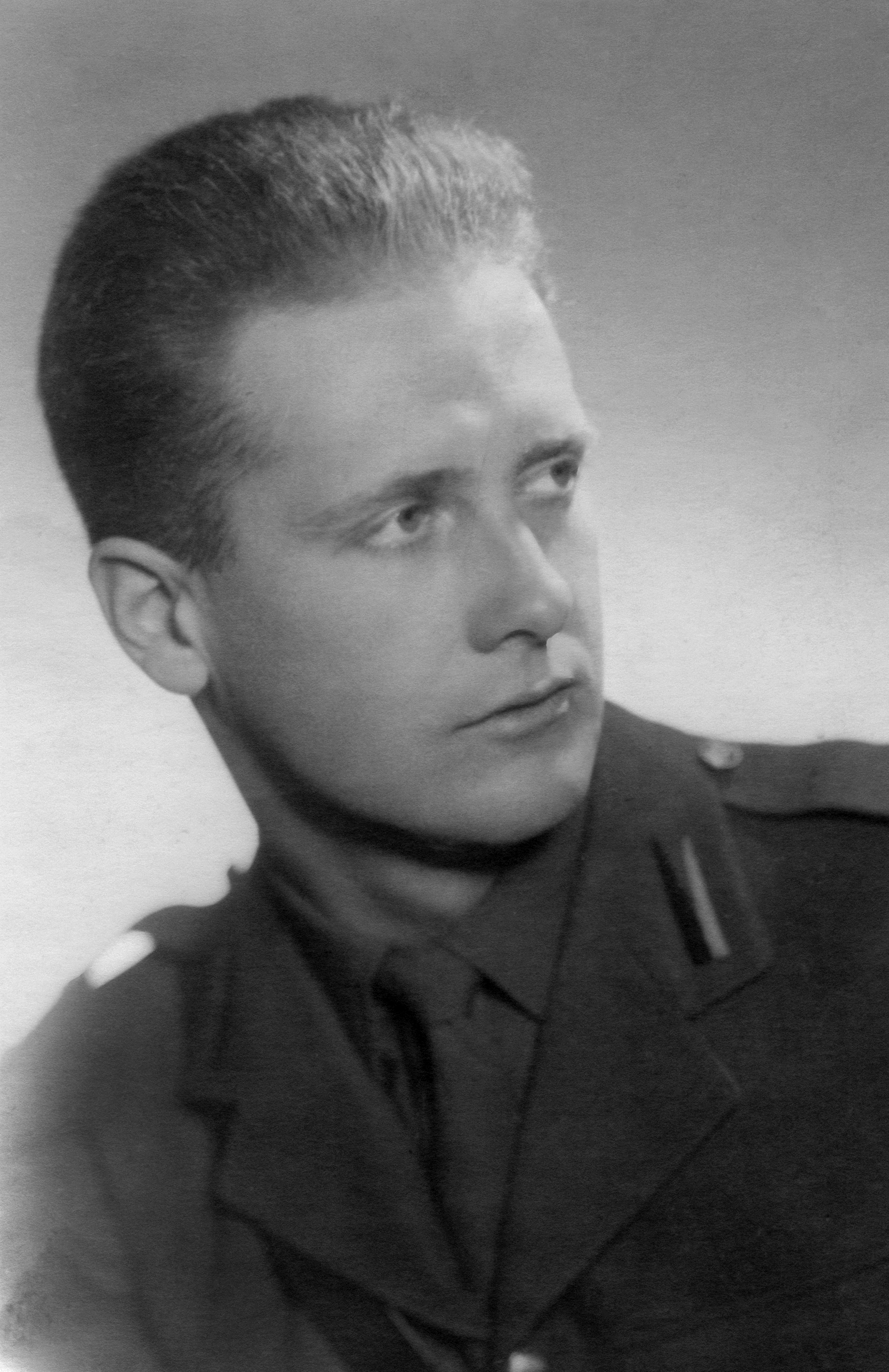
Susan's grandson, Prince Marie-André Poniatowski (1921–1945)

On November 3, 1899, Willing was married to Francis Cooper Lawrance Jr. (1858–1904) at Trinity Church in Newport, Rhode Island. At the wedding, Susan was walked down the aisle by her father while the St. Cecilia Quartet sang the bridal chorus from Lohengrin; Winthrop Rutherfurd was the best man. Lawrance, a Yale graduate and lawyer, was the widower of Sarah Eggleston Lanier (a daughter of Charles D. Lanier) and the father of Charles Lanier Lawrance (1882–1950) and Kitty Lanier Lawrance (1893-1936). Francis' sister, Frances Margaret Lawrance, was married to George Venables-Vernon, 7th Baron Vernon. Following their marriage, they bought a large home in Newport. Just five years after their marriage, forty-six year old Francis died in Pau, Pyrénées-Atlantiques, France on March 18, 1904. Before his death, they were the parents of:

- Frances Alice Willing Lawrance (1901–1989), who married Prince Andrzej "Andre" Poniatowski (1899–1977) of the House of Poniatowski in 1919. His father was Prince André Poniatowski (himself a son of Prince Stanisław August Poniatowski) and his mother was the former Elizabeth Sperry, a Stockton flour mill heiress.

After her husband's death, she moved to Paris with her daughter and her step-children were looked after by their paternal grandfather.

Susan, who lived at 23 rue Octave-Feuillet in Paris, died on May 2, 1933, in Paris, France. She was buried at the American Cathedral in Paris. In her will, she left her estate to her daughter and grandson. Her daughter received all of her jewelry, personal effects, a life estate in a trust of $250,000, a remainder interest in a $40,000 trust and the residuary estate.

=== Descendants ===
Through her daughter Frances, she was the grandmother of Marie-André Poniatowski (1921–1945) and François Poniatowski (1922-2008) and Constance Poniatowski (1925-2007), Marie-André a soldier who died during the World War II.

Through her stepson Charles, she was the step-grandmother of Emily Lawrance (1911–2004), who married author Joseph S. Frelinghuysen Jr., and Francis Cooper Lawrance (1916–2004). In 1915, her stepdaughter Kitty married W. Averell Harriman, who later became the Governor of New York. They divorced in 1928 after having two children together.
