= John Rhea Barton =

American orthopedic surgeon (1794-1871)

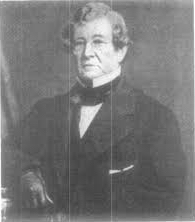
- Born: April 1, 1794; Lancaster, Pennsylvania, U.S.
- Died: January 1, 1871 (aged 76); Philadelphia, Pennsylvania, U.S.
- Resting place: Laurel Hill Cemetery, Philadelphia, Pennsylvania, U.S.
- Education: Pennsylvania Hospital
- Known for: Barton's fracture
- Spouses: Ann Fries Frazer; Susanna Ridgway Rotch
- Children: Alice Bell Barton
- Parent(s): William Barton; Elizabeth Rhea
- Relatives: John R. B. Willing (grandson); Susan R. Willing (granddaughter); Ava Willing (granddaughter); Benjamin Smith Barton (uncle)

John Rhea Barton (April 1794 – January 1, 1871) was an American orthopedic surgeon remembered for describing Barton's fracture.

== Early life ==
Barton was born in Lancaster, Pennsylvania in April 1794. He was the son of Elizabeth (née Rhea) Barton (b. 1759) and William Barton (1754–1817), a lawyer who designed the Great Seal of the United States. Among his siblings was older brother was William Paul Crillon Barton, the medical botanist, physician, professor, naval surgeon, and botanical illustrator. His uncle, Benjamin Smith Barton, was an eminent medical botanist and vice-president of the American Philosophical Society.

Barton graduated from the School of Medicine (now known as the Perelman School of Medicine) at the University of Pennsylvania in 1818 and started teaching there soon after.

== Career ==
He became surgeon at the Philadelphia Almshouse, working for Philip Syng Physick, and returned to the Pennsylvania Hospital as surgeon in 1823.

He was said to be ambidextrous, and did not move around once positioned for an operation. He originated the osteotomy for joint ankylosis, performing a femoral osteotomy between the greater and lesser trochanters; in 1826 he performed a hip osteotomy in seven minutes.

He is also known for the Barton bandage, a figure-of-eight bandage to support the jaw, and Barton forceps, curved obstetric forceps.

== Personal life ==
Barton was married to Ann Fries Frazer (1807–1837). Ann was the daughter of Robert Frazer, the District Attorney for Delaware County, and granddaughter of Gen. Persifor Frazer. In Philadelphia, the Bartons resided at 512 South Broad Street. Together, they were the parents of:

- Alice Bell Barton (1833–1903), who married Edward Shippen Willing (1822–1906), grandson of Thomas Willing, who served as Mayor of Philadelphia and the first president of First Bank of the United States, and the great-grandson of Charles Willing, also a Mayor of Philadelphia.

After his first wife's death, Barton remarried to heiress Susanna Ridgway Rotch, the daughter of merchant Jacob Ridgway.

Barton died on January 1, 1871, in Philadelphia. He was buried at Laurel Hill Cemetery in Philadelphia.

=== Descendants ===
Through his daughter Alice, he was the grandfather of John Rhea Barton Willing, who did not marry; Susan Ridgway Willing, who married Francis Cooper Lawrance Jr.; and Ava Lowle Willing, who was married to John Jacob Astor IV (son of William B. Astor, Jr. and Caroline Schermerhorn Astor) until 1910, and, thereafter, to Thomas Lister, 4th Baron Ribblesdale.

=== Legacy ===
In 1877, his widow Susan Ridgley Barton endowed "The John Rhea Barton Professorship of Surgery," at the University of Pennsylvania School of Medicine, the first endowed chair in surgery in the U.S.
