= John Rhea Barton Willing =

American socialite and violin collector (1864-1913)

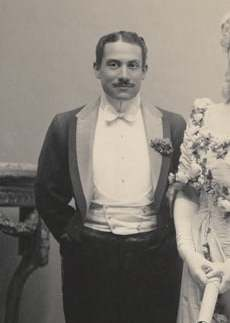
- Willing in 1905
- Born: December 21, 1864; Philadelphia, Pennsylvania, U.S.
- Died: September 2, 1913 (aged 48); Philadelphia, Pennsylvania, U.S.
- Resting place: Laurel Hill Cemetery, Philadelphia, Pennsylvania, U.S.
- Education: University of Pennsylvania; Christ Church, Oxford
- Relatives: Susan Ridgway Willing (sister); Ava Lowle Willing (sister); Vincent Astor (nephew); Ava Alice Muriel Astor (niece); John Rhea Barton (grandfather)

John Rhea Barton Willing (December 21, 1864 – September 2, 1913) was an American socialite and violin collector who was prominent in New York and Philadelphia society during the Gilded Age.

== Early life ==
Willing was born in Philadelphia on December 21, 1864. He was the only surviving son of Edward Shippen Willing and Alice Caroline (née Barton) Willing. His siblings included Susan Ridgway Willing, who married Francis C. Lawrance Jr.; Edward Shippen Willing Jr. who died at age six; and Ava Lowle Willing who was married to John Jacob Astor IV and Thomas Lister, 4th Baron Ribblesdale.

His maternal grandfather, and namesake, was Dr. John Rhea Barton, an orthopedic surgeon known for describing Barton's fracture. His paternal great-grandfather was Thomas Willing, mayor of Philadelphia and the first president of First Bank of the United States.

Willing entered the University of Pennsylvania in 1881 and graduated with an A.B. degree in 1885. There, he was a member of the Fraternity of Delta Psi (St. Anthony Hall). He graduated from Christ Church, Oxford in 1886.

== Career ==
In 1892, Willing was included in Ward McAllister's The Four Hundred purported to be an index of New York's best families, published in The New York Times. Willing moved in the "highest social circles" and was considered an accomplished athlete. He was a founding member of the Philadelphia Fencing and Sparring Club.

He collected art, including a renowned copy of the Henry Inman portrait of John Marshall, Chief Justice of the United States. He also made and collected violins, including several instruments considered the finest known. After several years of prominence in society in New York, Philadelphia and Newport, around 1893 he "gave up the usual social gayeties" to travel around the United States and Europe "in search of violins and violin lore. His passion for music and for the violin especially soon grew until he gave most of his time to its indulgence."

He died from sepsis brought on by diphtheria at Jefferson Hospital in Philadelphia in 1913 at the age of 48. He was buried at Laurel Hill Cemetery in Philadelphia.

== Personal life ==
Willing occupied 511 South Broad Street in Philadelphia, which was directly across the street from the home of his grandfather, John Rhea Barton, where his mother grew up. Willing did not marry and had no children. He left the bulk of his estate to his sisters. In his will, he left a Stradivarius violin to his longtime friend, A. Lanfear Norrie, who predeceased him.
