= Mount Rutsen =

Mountain in New York, United States

- Location within New York Adirondack Park Location within the United States

Highest point
- Elevation: 335 feet (102 m)
- Coordinates: 41°57′24″N 73°55′37″W

Geography
- Location: Dutchess County, New York, U.S.
- Topo map: USGS Kingston East

Mount Rutsen is a mountain in New York. It is located in the 200-acre (0.81 km^{2}) Ferncliff Forest, west-northwest of Rhinebeck in Dutchess County. The Mount Rutsen (Ferncliff) Fire Tower is located at the summit.

== History ==
On Mount Rutsen an old stone observation tower was built by the Astors. A second tower was built for the United States Coast and Geodetic Survey to help with map-making. Finally, the second tower was built during World War II by the United States Army Corps of Engineers as a watch tower. This enclosed tower contained a telephone as well as utilities for full-time occupation so that enemy planes could be spotted. This tower was particularly useful in watching out for planes attempting to attack President Roosevelt's home and those approaching New York City. After the war, the tower became a popular attraction and was purely recreational. In 2006, the tower was deemed unsafe and was replaced in 2007 by the current observation tower.
