= Ava Lowle Willing =

American socialite (1868–1958)

The Right Honourable The Lady Ribblesdale
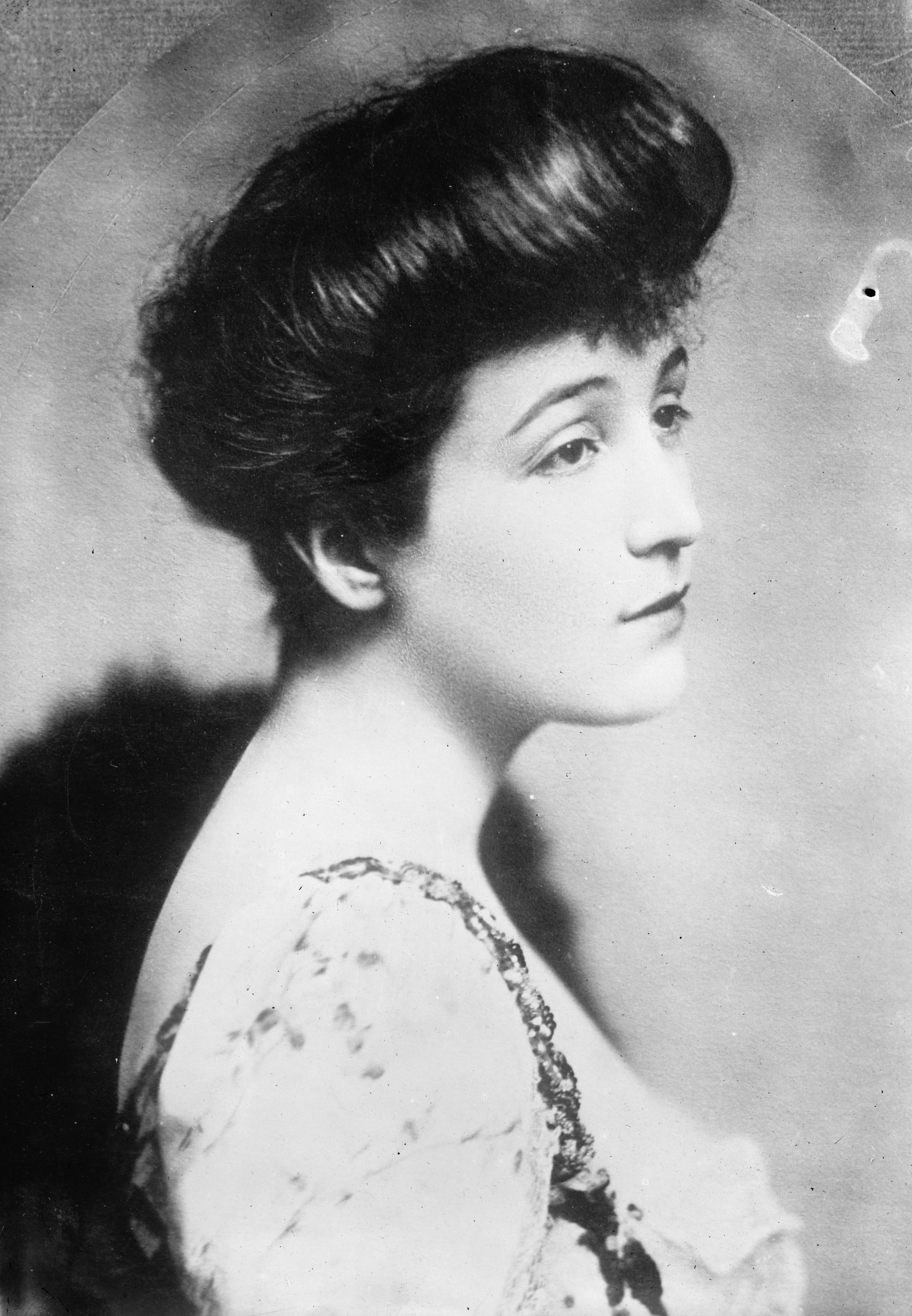
- Willing c. 1911
- Born: Ava Lowle Willing; September 15, 1868; Newport, Rhode Island, U.S.
- Died: June 9, 1958 (aged 89); New York City, New York, U.S.
- Burial place: Locust Valley Cemetery, Locust Valley, New York, U.S.
- Spouses: John Jacob Astor IV (m. 1891; div. 1909) Thomas Lister, 4th Baron Ribblesdale (m. 1919; died 1925)
- Children: William Vincent Astor; Ava Alice Muriel Astor
- Relatives: Susan Ridgway Willing (sister); John Rhea Barton Willing (brother); Prince Ivan Obolensky (grandson)

Ava Lowle Lister, Baroness Ribblesdale (née Willing, later Astor; September 15, 1868 – June 9, 1958) was an American socialite. She was the first wife of John Jacob Astor IV and later married Thomas Lister, 4th Baron Ribblesdale.

== Early life ==
Ava Lowle Willing was born on September 15, 1868, in Newport, Rhode Island, to Edward Shippen Willing (1822–1906) and Alice Caroline Barton (1833–1903). She had one older sister and two older brothers: (1) Susan Ridgway Willing (1862–1940) who married on November 3, 1899, Francis C. Lawrance Jr. (1858–1904), they had one daughter; (2) John Rhea Barton Willing (1864–1913) who died from pneumonia; and (3) Edward Shippen Willing Jr. (1867–1873) who died at age six.

== Personal life ==
=== First marriage ===
On February 17, 1891, she married Colonel John Jacob "Jack" Astor IV (1864–1912), son of William Backhouse Astor Jr. (1829–1892) and Caroline Webster "Lina" Schermerhorn (1830–1908), at her parents' mansion at 510 South Broad Street in Philadelphia, Pennsylvania. They went on a 5-week honeymoon in Europe. The newlywed couple was given, among many lavish gifts, a furnished townhouse on Fifth Avenue in New York City. Though the marriage was tumultuous, the Astors had two children:

- William Vincent Astor (November 15, 1891 – February 3, 1959)
- Ava Alice Muriel Astor (July 7, 1902 – July 19, 1956)

The family lived in their New York townhouse at 840 Fifth Avenue, their 2,000 acre country estate, Ferncliff in Rhinebeck, New York, and Beechwood, their Newport, Rhode Island, mansion. By 1896, Mrs. Ava Astor had become socially active in England. She had a country estate near the capital, Regent Lodge, Regent's Park, and a townhouse on Grosvenor Square in Mayfair, London.

In 1909, after returning from England, Ava sued Jack for divorce on November 19, and four months later on March 5, 1910, the State of New York decreed in her favor. She received a $10 million (equivalent to $345,536,000 in 2025) settlement. Their son lived with his father before leaving to attend Harvard University, while Ava got custody of their seven-year-old daughter. While Vincent was in his second year at Harvard, Jack was on the maiden voyage of the RMS Titanic, and became one of the casualties while returning from his honeymoon with his new bride, Madeleine Talmage Force. This event left young Vincent as one of the wealthiest men in the United States.

=== Second marriage ===
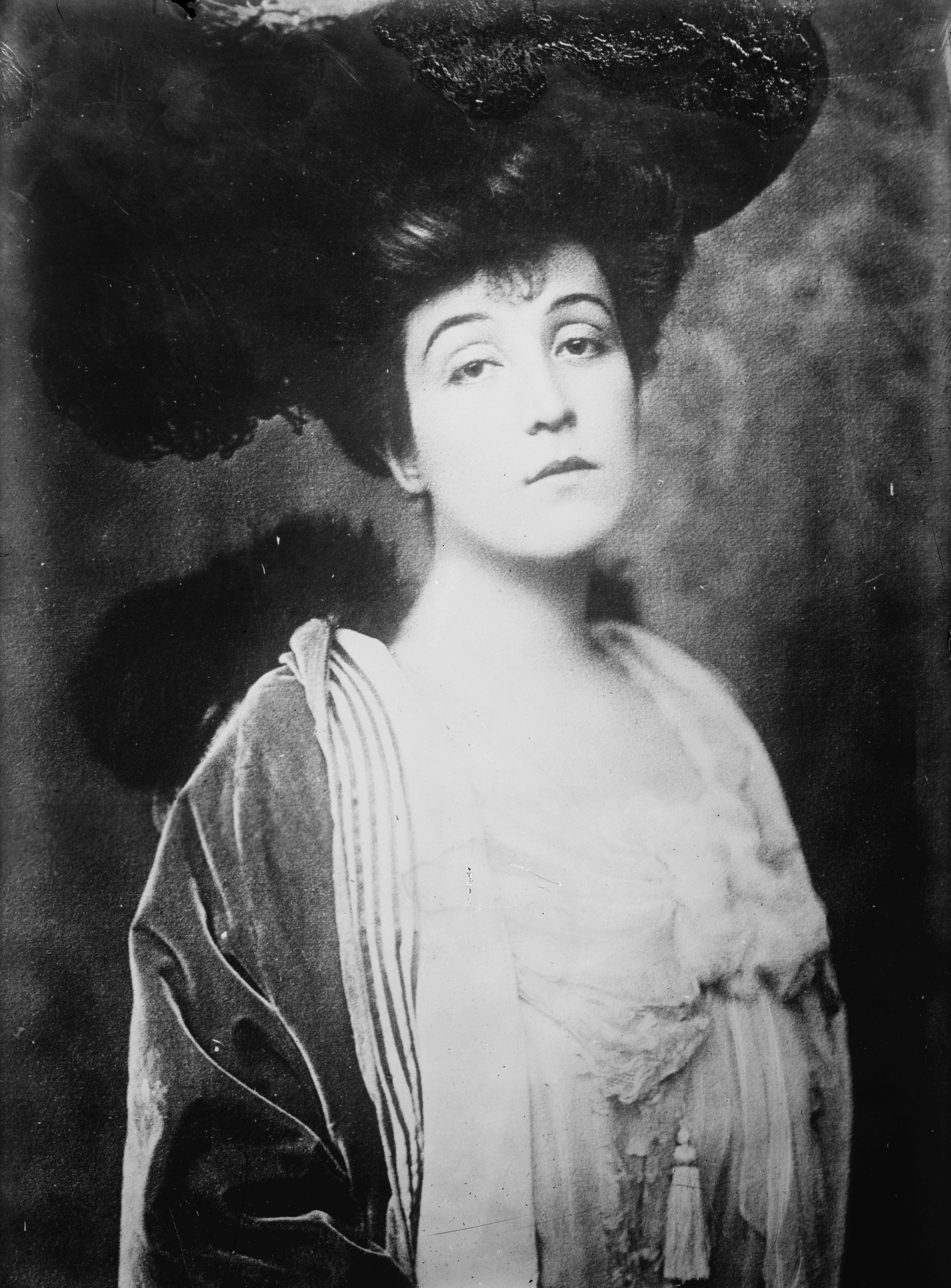
Photo circa 1911

In September 1911, Ava and her daughter moved to England. They lived in her townhouse on Grosvenor Square in Mayfair, London (from October–April) and her country estate, Regents Lodge in Regents Park (from May–September).

When World War I broke out, Ava became involved with the American Women's War Relief Fund and she served as the group's vice-president.

On June 3, 1919, Ava married Thomas Lister, 4th Baron Ribblesdale at St Mary's, Bryanston Square in London and she was known as Lady Ribblesdale. Lister died six years later on October 21, 1925, at their townhouse on Grosvenor Square in Mayfair, London. They had no children together and after Baron Ribblesdale's death, she did not remarry. He was buried in the Lister vault at St Mary the Virgin Churchyard in Gisburn, Lancashire.

In June 1940, she returned to the United States on the liner SS President Roosevelt as a war refugee, reclaimed her American citizenship, and became known as Mrs. Ava Willing Ribblesdale.

=== Death ===
On June 9, 1958, Ava died in her apartment at 720 Park Avenue in Manhattan, New York. Ava is buried at Locust Valley Cemetery, in Locust Valley, New York. She left a token bequest of $25,000 to her son, Vincent, but the bulk of her $3,000,000 estate was left to her daughter Ava Alice's four children: Prince Ivan Sergeyevich Obolensky, Princess Sylvia Sergeyevna Obolensky, Romana von Hofmannsthal, and Emily Sophia Harding.

== See also ==
- Astor family
