= James Woodhouse (chemist) =

American surgeon and chemist (1770–1809)

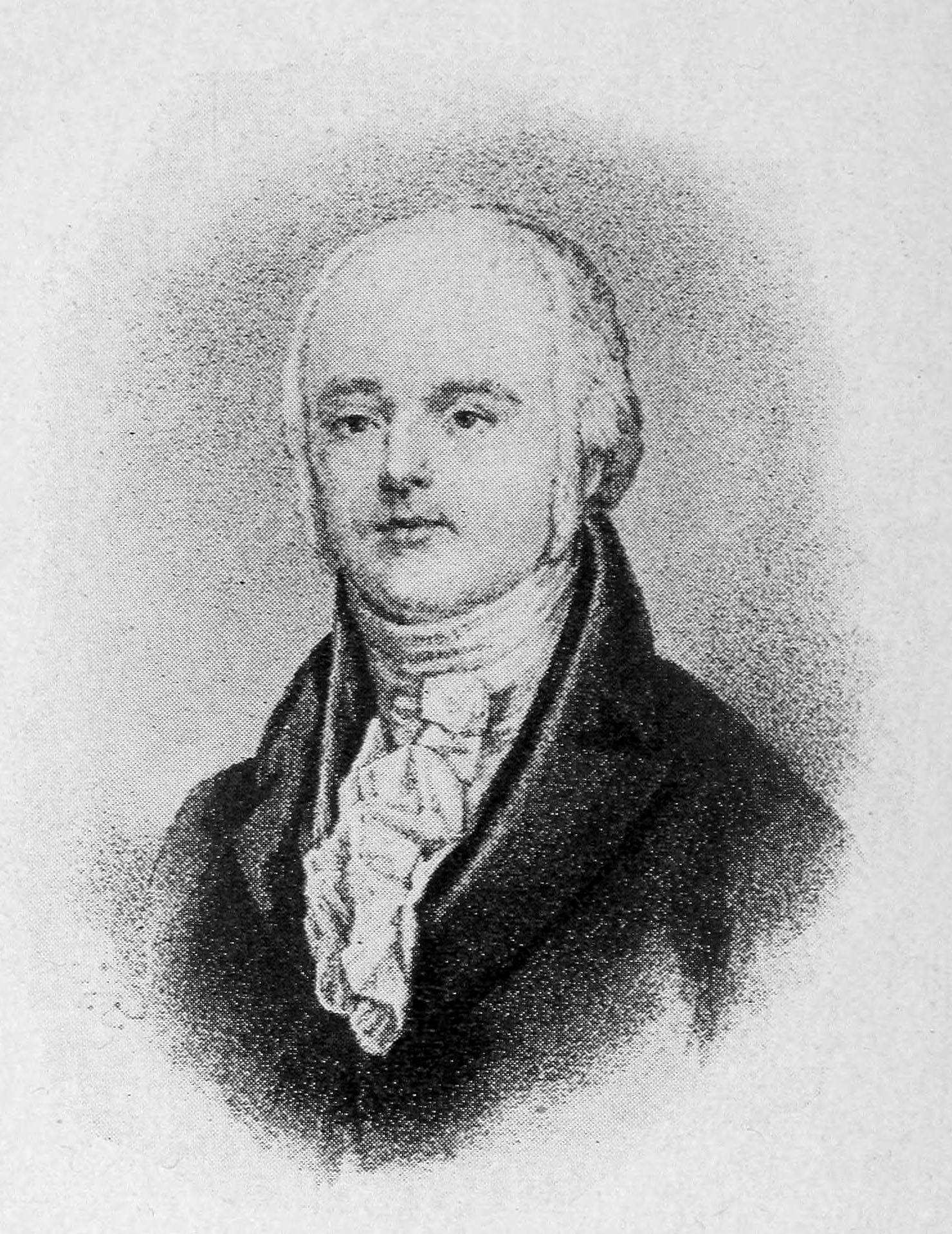
- Born: November 17, 1770; Philadelphia, Pennsylvania
- Died: June 4, 1809 (aged 38); Philadelphia, Pennsylvania
- Resting place: Saint Peter's Episcopal Churchyard
- Education: University of Pennsylvania (A.B., 1787) Perelman School of Medicine (M.D. 1792)
- Scientific career
- Fields: chemistry, medicine
- Doctoral advisor: Benjamin Rush
- Doctoral students: William P. C. Barton
- Other notable students: Benjamin Silliman Robert Hare

Signature
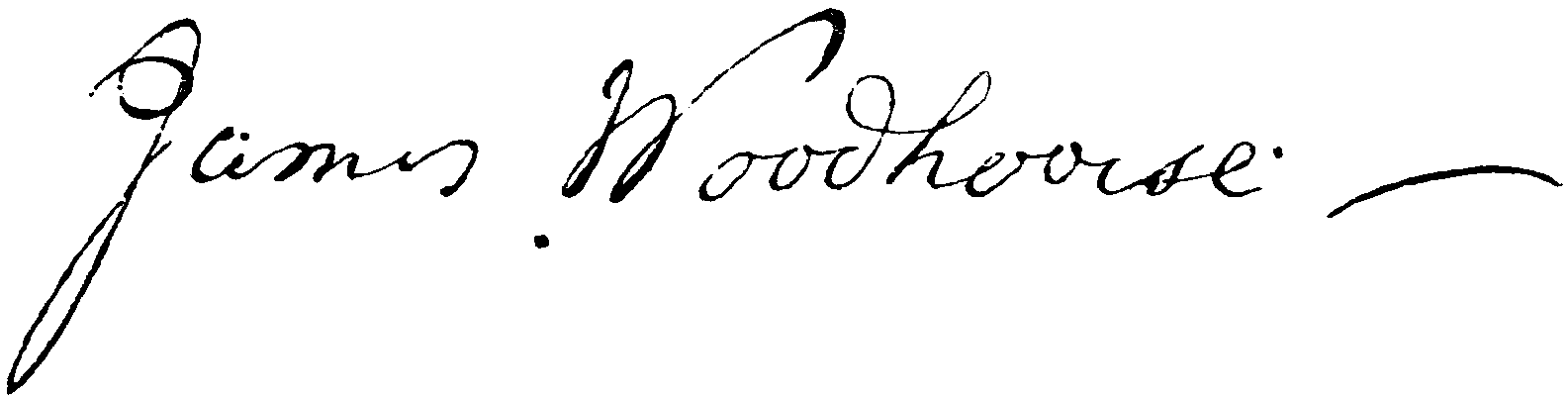

James Woodhouse (17 November 1770 in Philadelphia – 4 June 1809 in Philadelphia) was an American surgeon and chemist.

== Biography ==
He was the son of English emigrants to the British America. He graduated from the University of Pennsylvania in 1787, and from its medical department in 1792. In 1791 he served as a surgeon in General Arthur St. Clair's expedition against the Native American in the North West Territory. When Joseph Priestley declined to accept the chair of chemistry at the University of Pennsylvania in 1795, Woodhouse received the appointment, which he held until his death.

He is said to have been the first to demonstrate the superiority of the Lehigh anthracite coal in Northampton County, Pennsylvania, over the bituminous coals of Virginia for intensity and regularity of heating power. Similarly, some scholars have suggested Woodhouse may have been the first to discover carbon monoxide. Incidentally, carbon monoxide has been suspected to have been a factor in his death.

At age 26, circa 1796, Woodhouse demonstrated the role of oxygen in aerobic respiration in oxidation of carbonaceous matter in blood which further led him to reject phlogiston theory. In 1802, Woodhouse visited Humphry Davy in London and returned to the University of Pennsylvania School of Medicine to begin reproducing experiments with nitrous oxide that had occurred at the Pneumatic Institution, which would later be the subject for the dissertation of his student, William P. C. Barton.

He also studied potassium and identified a novel isolation method in 1808, identification of basalt, starch and bread making. Furthermore, he studied botany and described aquatic respiration of certain marine specimen, and described industrial purification for large batches of camphor.

He was a member of the American Philosophical Society, and contributed to its transactions, to Samuel L. Mitchell's Medical Repository, and to John R. Coxe's Medical Museum.

== Publications ==
- Dissertation on the Chemical and Medical Properties of the Persimmon-Tree (1792)
- Observations on the Combinations of Acids, Bitters, and Astringents (1793)
- Answer to Dr. J. Priestley's Considerations on the Doctrine of Phlogiston and the Decomposition of Water (1794)
- Young Chemist's Pocket-Companion (1797)
- Experiments and Observations in the Vegetation of Plants (1802)

He edited:

- Parkinson, Chemical Pocket-Book (Philadelphia, 1802)
- Chaptal, Elements of Chemistry (4th ed., 2 vols., 1807)
