= Ferncliff Farm =

19th-century estate in Rhinebeck, New York, U.S.

Coordinates: 41.944°N 73.936°W

Ferncliff Farm (or Ferncliff) was an estate established in the mid-19th century by William Backhouse Astor Jr. (1829–1892) in Rhinebeck, New York, United States..

Not far from his mother's estate of Rokeby, where he had spent summers, Ferncliff was a working farm with dairy and poultry operations, as well as stables where he bred horses. In 1902, his son and heir, John Jacob Astor IV, commissioned architect Stanford White to design a large sports pavilion (called the "Ferncliff Casino"), which included one of the first indoor pools in the U.S. The sports pavilion was later converted into a residence (called "Astor Courts") for his son, Vincent Astor.

After the death of Vincent Astor, the 2,800-acre estate was broken up. Some parcels (such as the gatehouse, staff quarters, teahouse and dairy barns) became private homes. Two hundred acres were donated for the founding of the Ferncliff Forest nature preserve. An additional donation of land led to the establishment of a nursing home and rehabilitation center on the former estate property.

== Background ==
William Backhouse Astor Jr. was the son of William Backhouse Astor Sr. (1792–1875) and his wife, Margaret Rebecca Armstrong (1800–1872). His mother was the daughter of Senator John Armstrong Jr. and Alida Livingston Armstrong, and she had grown up at the Armstrong estate (La Bergerie) at Barrytown in Dutchess County, New York.

William Jr. was born in 1829. His parents purchased his mother's childhood home from her widowed father in 1836. Margaret renamed the estate Rokeby, as the area around the Mudder Kill reminded her of the glen in Sir Walter Scott's poem of that name. Rokeby became the family's summer home. Upon the death of William Sr. in 1875, Rokeby passed to Margaret Ward Chanler, daughter of William Jr.'s late sister Emily.

== History ==
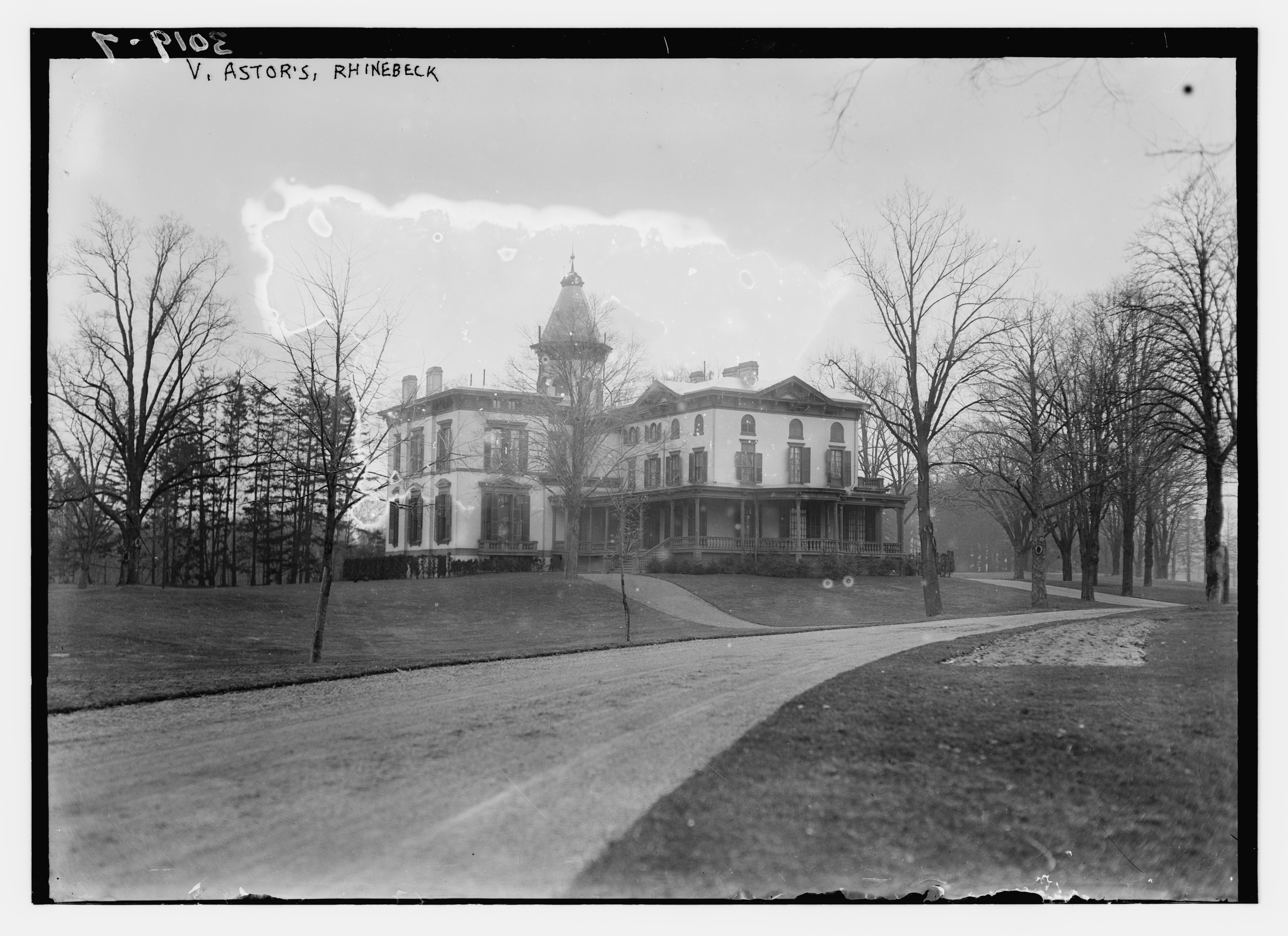
William Backhouse Astor Jr.'s Ferncliff mansion, shown c. 1910 and demolished during the 1940s

The area that became Ferncliff was first inhabited by the Wawyachtonoc, a tribe of the Mahican confederation, known locally as the Sepasco Indians, after Lake Sepasco. By the early 1800s, the land was occupied by farms.

Around 1853, William Jr. purchased several small farms a few miles south of Rokeby. He then established Ferncliff Farm, where he built an Italianate mansion overlooking the Hudson River on River Road in Rhinebeck. He continued to purchase adjoining properties, and the estate eventually had a mile and a half of Hudson River frontage. At Ferncliff, he bred racing and trotting horses. His son, John Jacob Astor IV, was born at Ferncliff in 1864. Upon the death of William Jr. in 1892, John Jacob IV inherited the Ferncliff property.

Thomas H. Suckley ("Sook-lee") was the son of George and Catherine Rutsen Suckley . His father was a wealthy merchant in New York City, while Thomas became a property developer in Manhattan. His mother, Catherine, was the daughter of John Rutsen, whose maternal grandfather was Gilbert Livingston, son of Robert Livingston the Elder, Lord of Livingston Manor. Suckley inherited from his mother 125 acres of land at Mt. Rutsen, on the north of the village of Rhinebeck. In 1876, he donated the land at Mt. Rutsen to the New York Methodist Conference to establish a retirement community for ministers. By 1900, the farm that supported the retreat was failing, and the Methodist Conference sold 106 acres to John Jacob Astor IV. Apart from operating a working dairy and poultry farm, Astor maintained his father's stables, but switched to breeding hackney and carriage horses.

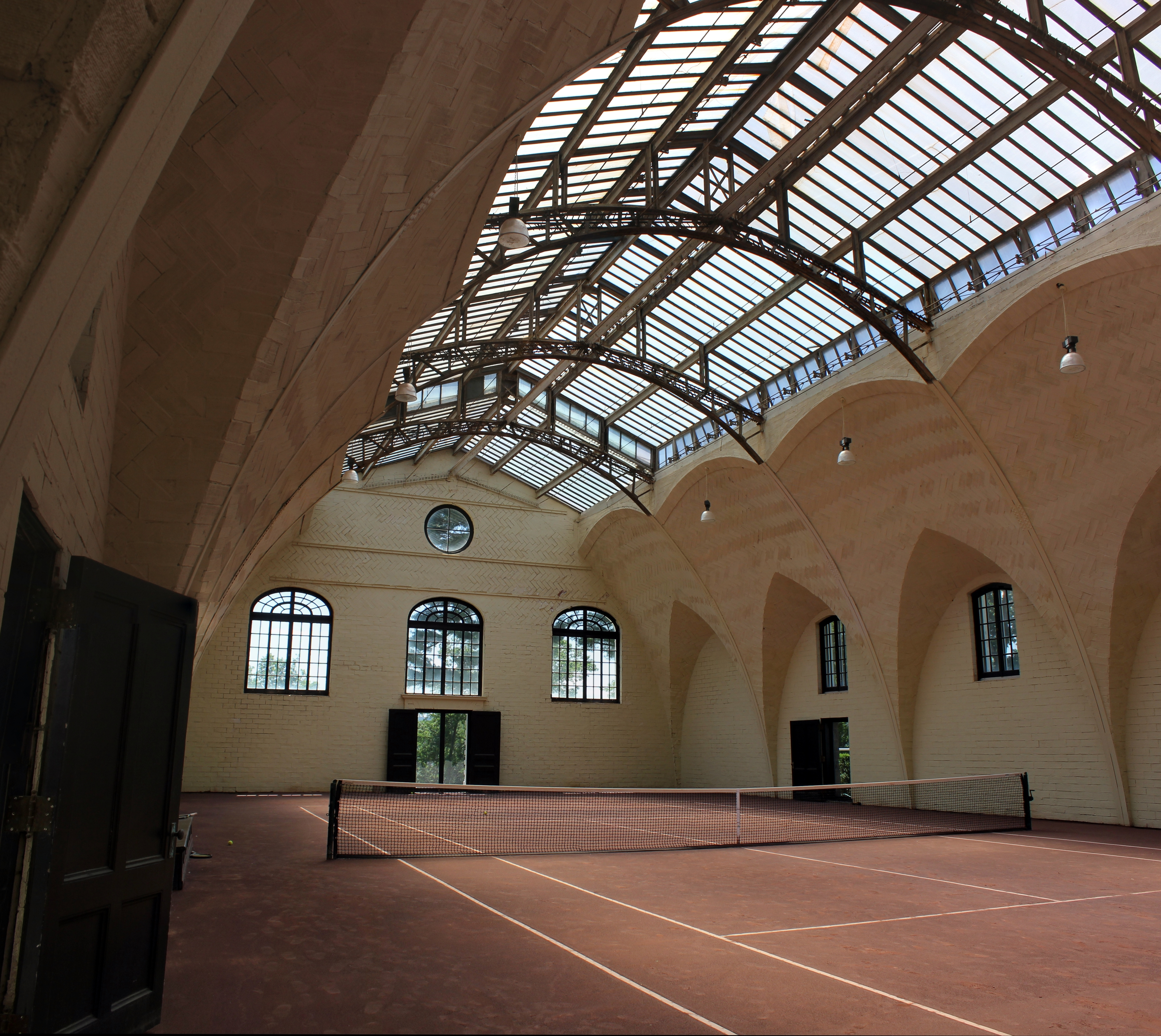
The indoor tennis court

In 1902, John Jacob IV commissioned White, of McKim, Mead & White, to design the Ferncliff Casino (the term "casino" referring to a sports pavilion) for entertaining guests. (It was also known as "Tennis House".) The Beaux-Arts–style building was completed 1904. It included indoor tennis and squash courts, a bowling alley, an indoor swimming pool, a shooting range, guestrooms and was close to a nearby boathouse on the river. Having completed work on the sports pavilion, White then started work on improvements to the mansion.

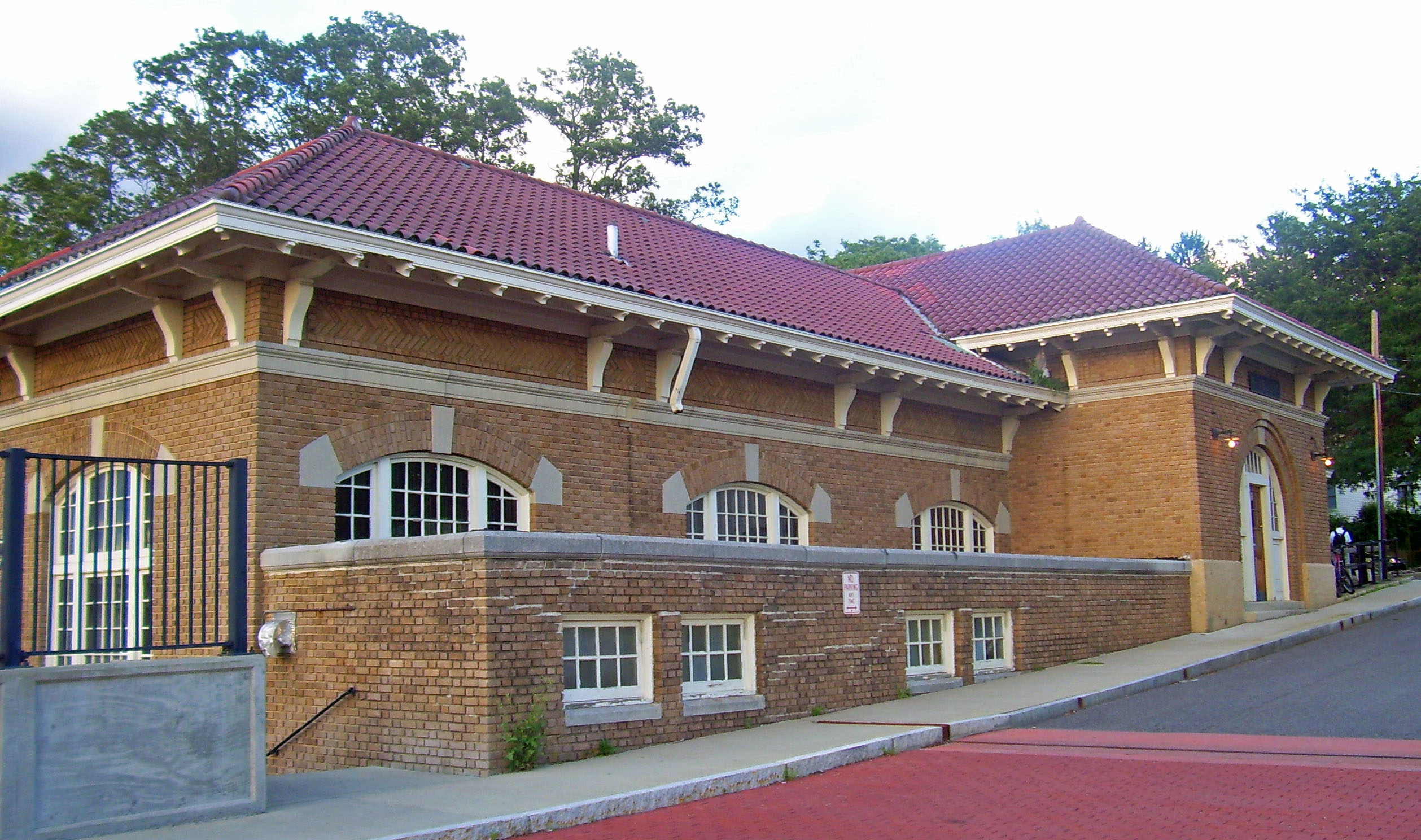
Rhinecliff train station building

In the early 20th century, a railroad station was built at Rhinecliff, reportedly due to the influence of John Jacob IV, a major stockholder in the New York Central Railroad. It is a contributing property to the Hudson River Historic District. There was, in addition, a small private station at Fernwood on the so-called "Hucklebush" Line between Rhinecliff and Hartford, Connecticut, whose telegraph station was designated "A".

By the time of John Jacob IV's death in the sinking of the Titanic in 1912, the Ferncliff estate had grown to 2,800 acres of apple orchards, cattle and dairy operations, and gardens. The property passed to his elder son, Vincent Astor. In 1926, Vincent's sister, Ava, married Serge Obolensky. Vincent gave her "Marienruh", the former Ehlers estate at Clifton Point and a mansion designed by Mott B. Schmidt.

During the 1940s, the mansion originally built by William Jr. was demolished. It was replaced in 1948 with a neoclassical brick folly called the "teahouse", to which the Astors would resort by miniature railroad. The Ferncliff Casino sports pavilion was renovated and converted into a 22,697 sq ft (2,108.6 m^{2}) residence. It was renamed "Astor Courts", the name White used. The squash courts were converted to a library.

=== Recent decades ===
After Vincent Astor's death in 1959, Ferncliff was split into several portions. Some parcels were sold, while others were the subject of large charitable donations:

- In 1964, Vincent Astor's widow, Brooke Astor, donated about 190 acres at Mt. Rusten to the Rhinebeck chapter of Rotary International for a forest preserve and game refuge, with the stipulation that it must remain "forever wild". The property was later transferred to Ferncliff Forest, Inc., a non-profit organization.
- About 1963, Mrs. Astor indicated that she wished to donate the property to Catholic Charities of the Archdiocese of New York. Astor Courts (189 River Road) became a nursing home run by the Carmelite Sisters for the Aged and Infirm. The original home was established in 1965. A new, more-modern facility elsewhere on the property off River Road was completed in 1973. During the time that Ferncliff Nursing Home was operated by the Carmelites, it served over 328 elderly residents and employed over 425 people. Ferncliff Nursing Home continues to operate on a remaining thirty-six acres, now under Archcare, the healthcare agency of the Archdiocese of New York. Around 2004, the Astor Courts site returned to private ownership. It was purchased and restored by real-estate developer Arthur Seelbinder and his wife, television producer Kathleen Hammer. In 2010, the wedding of Chelsea Clinton and Marc Mezvinsky was held there.
- A Greek Revival farmhouse (167 River Road), which once housed members of the estate staff, is now a private home.
- In 2000, the "teahouse" (195 River Road) was expanded and converted into a private residence. In 2013, it was purchased and renovated by businessman Robert Duffy.
- Photographer Annie Leibovitz purchased 220 acres that included the dairy barns completed in 1917, which she subsequently renovated.
- The gatehouse designed by Louis Augustus Ehlers marked the entrance to William Jr.'s mansion. It is now a private home.
- After Ava Astor Obolensky's death in 1956, the Marienruh property was used as a Christian youth camp, a home for unwed mothers, a drug-rehababilitation center, and an events space. It was privately purchased in 2010 and underwent restoration.

== See also ==
- Gilded Age
- List of Gilded Age mansions
