= William P. C. Barton =

American surgeon and scientist (1786–1856)

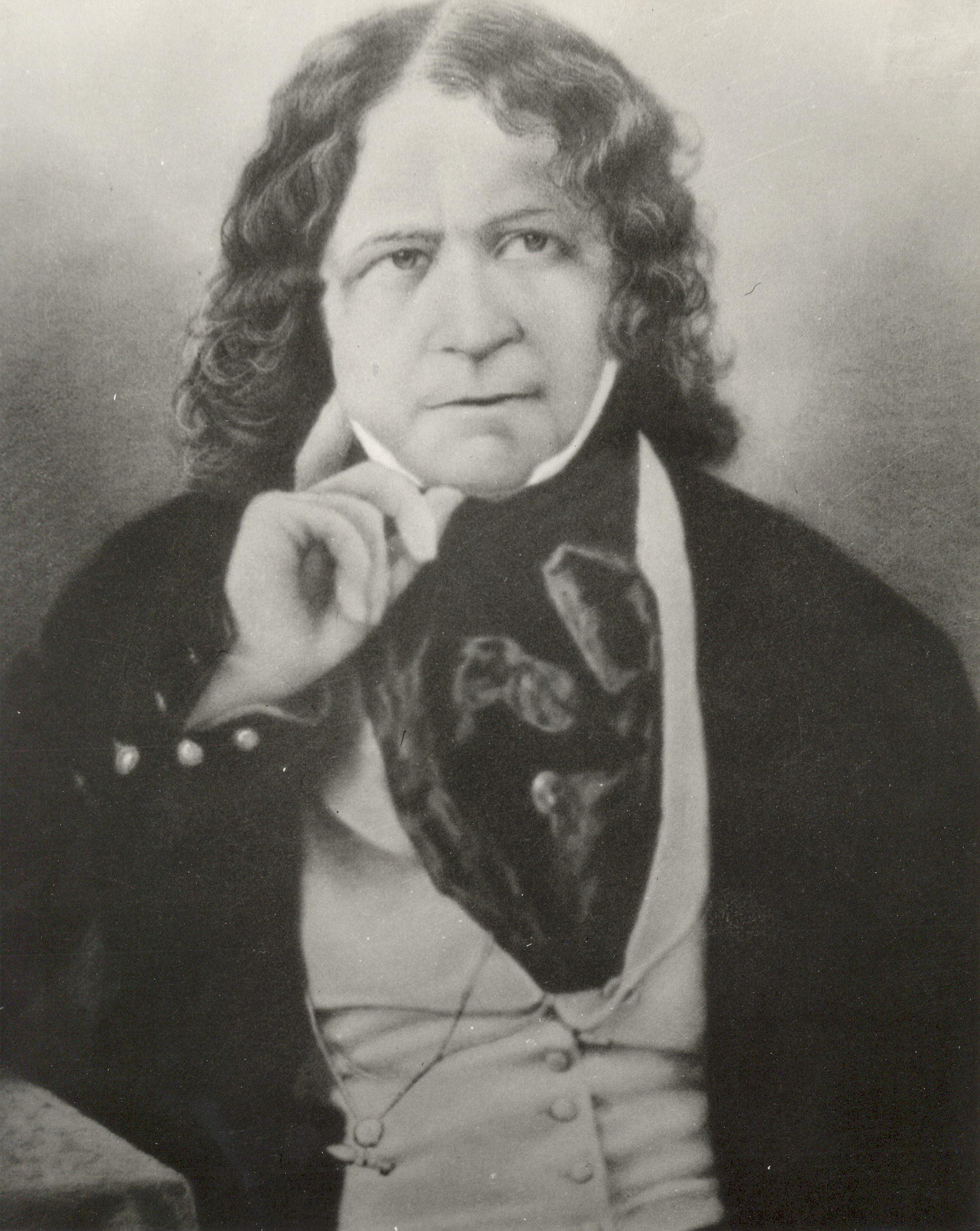
- Born: November 17, 1786; Philadelphia, Pennsylvania
- Died: March 27, 1856 (aged 69); Philadelphia, Pennsylvania
- Resting place: Laurel Hill Cemetery
- Occupations: botanical illustrator, university teacher, physician, botanist, surgeon, scientific collector

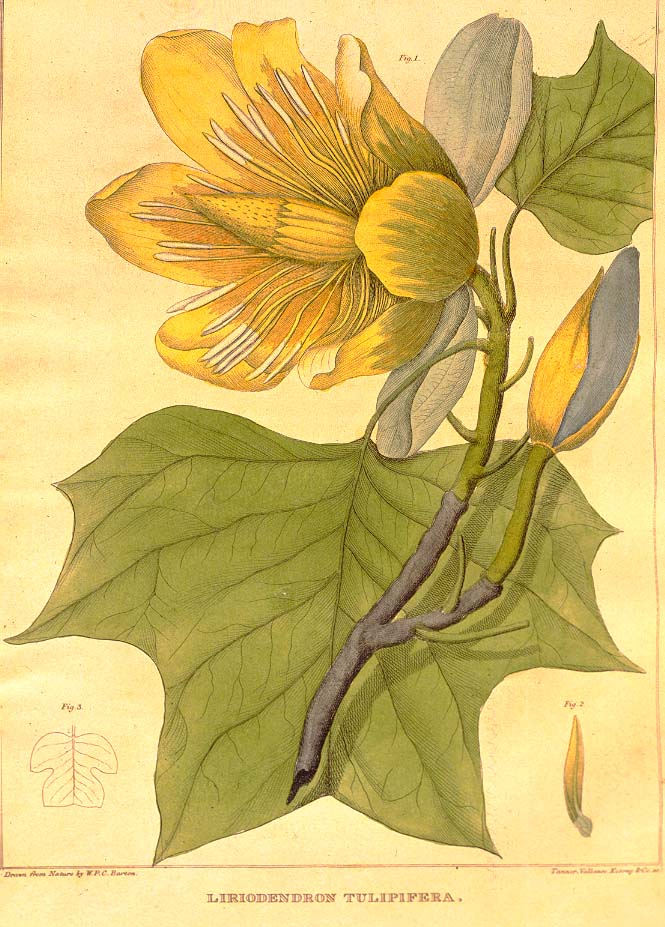
Liriodendron tulipifera by William Barton

William Paul Crillon Barton (November 17, 1786 – March 27, 1856), was a medical botanist, medical doctor, professor, naval surgeon, and botanical illustrator.

== Biography ==
Barton was born on November 17, 1786, in Philadelphia, Pennsylvania. His father William Barton, a lawyer, was the designer of the Great Seal of the United States. His uncle, Benjamin Smith Barton (1766–1815) was an eminent medical botanist and vice-president of the American Philosophical Society. In 1813, the younger Barton was also elected a member of the American Philosophical Society.

=== Education ===
As was customary for the era, Barton pursued a classical education at Princeton University, graduating with a Bachelor of Arts degree in 1805. The curriculum included Aristotelian logic, and study of the Greek and Latin languages. While he was at Princeton, each member of his class assumed the name of some celebrated man. The one he chose was Count Paul Crillon, and the initials P. C. were retained by him the rest of his life. Barton began studying medicine at the University of Pennsylvania School of Medicine in 1805 under his uncle, Benjamin Smith Barton, who was a renowned botanist and author of the first American text book on botanical science. In these years of study, William Barton's interest in botany and the natural sciences grew into a lifelong passion.

Barton was also a student of James Woodhouse who had visited Humphry Davy in London in 1802 regarding nitrous oxide and returned to School of Medicine attempting to replicate experiments that took place at the Pneumatic Institution. In 1808, upon publication of A Dissertation on Chymical Properties and Exhilarating Effects of Nitrous Oxide Gas and Its Application to Pneumatick Medicine, Barton received his medical degree from the University of Pennsylvania. Complete with an illustration of a giddy man breathing in “laughing gas” from a sheep's bladder, the treatise had great impact on scientific thought when nitrous oxide experiments were “generally derided as extravagant and imaginary.”

=== U.S. Naval Surgeon ===
At the age of 23, Barton chose to enter the U.S. Navy as a surgeon. He received his commission on April 10, 1809, and less than week later commissioned the famous Thomas Sully to paint his portrait for a sum of $50. This painting, now in the Wilstach Collection at the Philadelphia Museum of Art, shows a young Barton in uniform – a blue coat with gold braid, and hands gloved. Barton wrote, “I was overwhelmed with the difficulties I had to encounter in the performance of professional duties, where every species of inconvenience and disadvantage that can be imagined was opposed to the exertions of the surgeon.” Ultimately, Barton was not one to accept inadequacies, but rather to fight for reform.

Barton fought to tighten the controls of shipboard medical supplies. He called for the introduction of lemons and limes aboard Navy ships long before the U.S. Navy accepted the importance of an antiscorbutic treatment for vitamin C deficiency or scurvy. Barton went as far as to send a bottle of lime juice to the Secretary of the Navy Paul Hamilton with the instructions to drink it in the form of lemonade. His outspoken manner angered many of his colleagues. Barton, of necessity, became familiar with the administration of hospitals.

In February, 1811, Congress passed an act establishing naval hospitals. Secretary of the Navy Paul Hamilton later asked Barton to compose a set of regulations for governing these hospitals. Barton was well aware of the shortcomings in Navy medical care. Shipboard facilities were primitive, and there were no permanent hospitals ashore, only temporary facilities in Navy yards.

Barton began by drafting rules for governing naval hospitals. In 1812, the Navy Department submitted them to Congress. "Each hospital accommodating at least one hundred men should maintain a staff including a surgeon, who must be a college or university graduate; two surgeon's mates; a steward; a matron; a wardmaster; four permanent nurses; and a variety of servants." Not satisfied with the hastily drafted suggestions, Barton expanded his theories in a treatise published in 1814.

He was the first to promote the idea of employing female nurses in the U.S. Navy. He described the "matron's characteristics: she should be "discreet ... reputable ... capable ... neat, cleanly, and tidy in her dress, and urbane and tender in her deportment." She would supervise the nurses and other attendants as well as those working in the laundry, larder, and kitchen, but her main function was to ensure that patients were clean, well-fed, and comfortable.

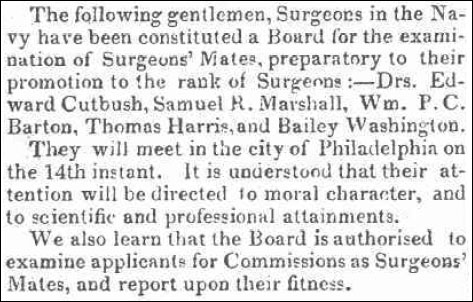
William Barton serves on naval board, June 11, 1824

By 1824, Barton served on the first board to examine candidates for the Navy's medical service. The intent of the board was to examine Surgeon's Mates, "preparatory to their promotion to the rank of Surgeons." The board was also authorized to examine applicants for Commissions as Surgeons' Mates and report upon their fitness.

In 1830 he became the commanding officer at Naval Hospital Norfolk, VA. He was involved in the development of the Philadelphia Naval Hospital when it was located in the Naval Asylum. Today, this gothic structure, that also served as the first home of the U.S. Naval Academy, stands in Grays Ferry.

President John Tyler appointed Barton to the office of first head of the Bureau of Medicine and Surgery on September 2, 1842. (The post of Navy Surgeon General was created in March 1871). His time as Chief clerk was active, but short. Among his recommendations were the adoption of a supply table so that drugs and medical supplies could be properly procured and accounted for; the abolition of a venereal fee; uniform standards for recruits; higher professional standards for Navy physicians; standardizations and administrations of naval hospitals; and strict control over the use of liquor on board ships. He was a vehement prohibitionist, and had a “liquor circular” pasted on boxes of whisky identifying the contents as medical supplies which required stringent accounting, a step which was not popular in the fleet.

=== Treatise on U.S. Navy hospitals ===
His A Treatise Containing a Plan for the Internal Organization and Government of Marine Hospitals in the United States: Together with A Scheme for Amending and Systematizing the Medical Department of the United States Navy (1814) contained recommendations of reform for the already new Navy hospital system. He urged that U.S. Navy hospitals should be modeled after British medical facilities. One of his many recommendations recommended that all hospital property should be marked “U.S. Naval Hospital” to prevent theft. The mere fact of the book having achieved a second edition three years later, is an indication of the estimation in which it was held. It contained a fund of information collected from various sources, both at home and abroad, and revealed an originality of thought and expression which stamped its author as far in advance of the times.

=== Pennsylvania academics ===
On the death of his uncle Benjamin Smith Barton in 1815, William Barton became professor of botany at the University of Pennsylvania, and for years much of Barton's time was dedicated to the teaching of Materia Medica, or medical botany, at the University of Pennsylvania School of Medicine and Thomas Jefferson Medical College. One of his prominent students was Dr. Samuel D. Gross, later immortalized in the Thomas Eakins painting The Gross Clinic (1876). Gross portrayed his old teacher as a colorful character in a speech delivered to Alumni Association of Thomas Jefferson Medical College on March 11, 1871.

From 1828 to 1829, Barton also served as the Dean of Jefferson Medical College. He was a fellow of the college of physicians in Philadelphia, president of the Linnaean Society, and a member of the American Philosophical Society, and other scientific societies.

=== Personal life ===
His brother was John Rhea Barton (1796–1871), the originator of corrective osteotomy for joint ankylosis. He invented both the "Barton bandage" (a figure eight bandage that provides support below and anterior to the lower jaw), and Barton forceps (obstetrical forceps with one fixed, curved blade and lunged anterior blade for application to a high transverse position of the head). The Barton Collection at Boston Public Library is named after Benjamin Smith Barton's son Thomas Pennant Barton (1803–1869), who was William Barton's first cousin. It comprises one of largest and most valuable Shakespeare collections in the world.

Barton was married to Esther Sergeant the grand daughter of David Rittenhouse, the great American astronomer and President of the American Philosophical Society. Esther Barton allegedly colored many of Dr. Barton's botanical drawings in his A Flora of North America, but a search for documentation was not unsuccessful. The colored plates in Flora that were engraved by Cornelius Tiebout (using what Barton called "the new style of engraving" and "the French method") can be viewed online.

He died on March 27, 1856, in Philadelphia, Pennsylvania.

== Bibliography ==
- A Dissertation on Chymical Properties and Exhilarating Effects of Nitrous Oxide Gas and Its Application to Pneumatick Medicine Philadelphia: Lorenzo Pres, 1808: xiii–v.
- A Treatise Containing a Plan for the Internal Organization and Government of Marine Hospitals in the United States: Together with A Scheme for Amending and Systematizing the Medical Department of the United States Navy 1st ed. Philadelphia; Privately printed, 1814.
- Vegetable Materia Medica of the United States (1817)
- Compedium Florae Philadelphicae (1818)
- A Flora of North America (vol. 1, 1821; vol. 2, 1822; vol. 3, 1823)
- Hints for Medical Officers Cruising in the West Indies (1830)
- A Polemical Remonstrance Against the Project of Creating the New Office of Surgeon General in the Navy of the United States (1838)

== Miscellaneous ==
The Philadelphia Botanical Club publishes a journal named after Dr. Barton called the Bartonia. The publication publishes articles about original research in plant systematics, plant ecology, and plant conservation biology.
