= Robert Duffy (businessman) =

American businessman

- Born: October 14, 1954 (age 71); Butler, Pennsylvania, United States
- Occupation: Fashion executive
- Known for: Work with Marc Jacobs
- Spouses: Alex Cespedes (m. 2010; div. 2012) Connor Dodd (m. 2015)
- Children: 2

Robert Duffy (born October 14, 1954) is an American businessman. He is the co-founder of the fashion label Marc Jacobs as well as the Marc by Marc Jacobs diffusion line. Both Marc Jacobs and the Marc by Marc Jacobs collections included women's ready-to-wear, men's ready-to-wear, children's ready-to-wear, and accessories for all divisions.

Duffy started the BookMarc store in early 2007. Duffy & Jacobs formed a partnership with LVMH in 1997 and Duffy acted as Design Studio Director for Louis Vuitton from 1998 to 2013.

== Early life and career ==
Duffy was born on October 14, 1954, in Butler, Pennsylvania and spent his early life in Pennsylvania and Cape Cod, Massachusetts.

Robert Duffy started his career at Bergdorf Goodman in their buying office in 1978. In 1983 he founded the company Sketchbook with Ruben Thomas. As a young executive, after viewing Marc Jacobs’ designs during a fashion show at Parsons School of Design, Duffy hired Jacobs as the designer at Sketchbook. In 1984, Duffy renamed the company Marc Jacobs International, and Marc became an equal partner. Interviewed by Vogue about their business model, Duffy said, "I never opened a store where there is fashion. In SoHo (New York), there was nothing but a garage there when we opened. People thought I was crazy... Opening Marc by Marc was very big. Marc's love is the collection line. I always wanted the company to be broad and wanted to reach out to a lot of people. It was difficult to convince people that it was necessary - to be a luxury brand but be all price points. But I knew I could do it and I'm proud we did it"

Duffy had various titles at Marc Jacobs International from 1984 to 2013 including Founder, chairman, Co-chairman, and President. In 1997 Duffy and Jacobs formed a partnership with LVMH. Duffy retained his titles at Marc Jacobs and was named Design Studio Director at Louis Vuitton from 1998 to 2013. LVMH acquired 20% ownership of the Marc Jacobs trademark at the time while Duffy and Jacobs retained 40% each.

In Summer 2013, there were 285 Marc Jacobs retail stores (including Marc by Marc Jacobs & Marc Jacobs Collection, and BookMarc stores) in 80 countries. Duffy opened the first high-end retail stores on Bleecker Street in New York.

In 2013 Robert Duffy stepped back from his day-to-day responsibilities at Marc Jacobs International to raise his young children. Duffy is currently Founder and Deputy Chairman of Marc Jacobs International and remains a substantial stockholder in Marc Jacobs International.

== Charities ==
In 1997 Duffy was diagnosed with metastatic melanoma. Duffy started the "Protect the Skin You're In" cancer research project benefiting the NYU Langone Medical Center. Over the years, he recruited celebrities and models to pose nude for t-shirts to raise money and awareness of melanoma. Celebrities who posed include Miley Cyrus, Eva Mendes, Milla Jovovich, Kate Upton, Victoria Beckham, Heidi Klum, Julian Moore, Hilary Swank, Christy Turlington and Naomi Campbell.

Duffy supports numerous charities including New York University Cancer Center, the Hetrick-Martin Institute/Harvey Milk School, the Human Rights Campaign, amfAR, New York State land trusts & preservation organizations, The Rhinebeck Science Foundation, and the Provincetown Art Association and Museum.

Duffy has received awards from the American Cancer Society, New York University Langone Medical Center, Aid for AIDS, Elizabeth Glaser Pediatric AIDS Foundation, Designers Against AIDS, amFAR, the Human Rights Campaign, and the Hetrick-Martin Institute/Harvey Milk School.

== Personal life ==
In 2013, Duffy purchased and restored Rhinebeck's Astor Tea House, a 40-acre estate on the Hudson River. This home and his other homes in Paris, Savannah, Georgia, Cape Cod, and New York's Greenwich Village have been featured in various publications.

Duffy married Alex Cespedes, a native of Paraguay working in real estate, in Provincetown, Massachusetts on April 20, 2010. In August 2011 they adopted a baby girl named Victoria, before divorcing a year later. On June 20, 2015, he married Connor Dodd at his farm in Rhinebeck. By January 2016 Duffy was in the process of adopting a second child, Caldwell.
