= Ferncliff Peninsula Natural Area =

Peninsula in Ohiopyle State Park, Pennsylvania, U.S.

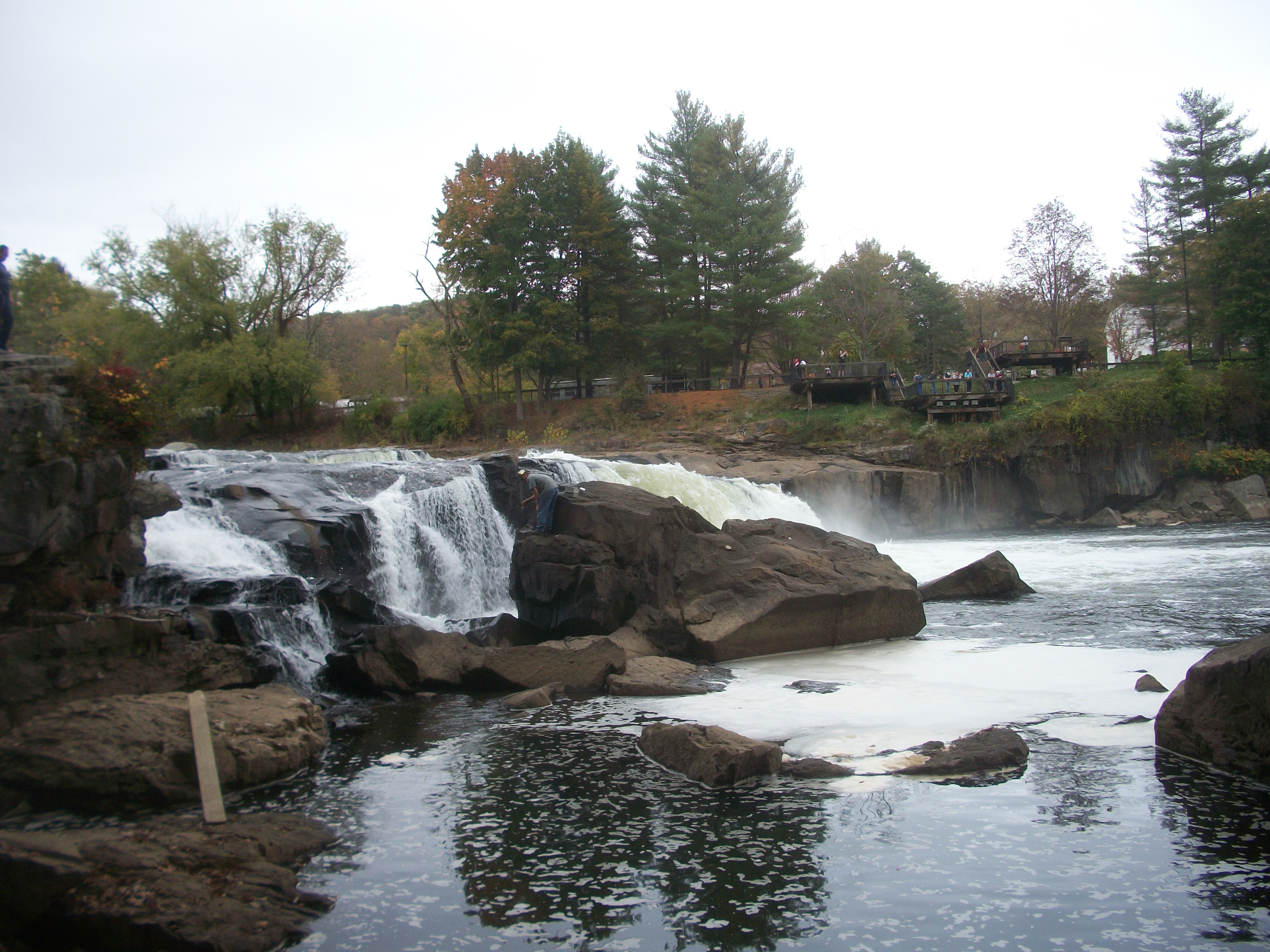
- Ohiopyle Falls from Ferncliff Peninsula

- Location within Pennsylvania
- Location: Fayette County, Pennsylvania
- Nearest city: Ohiopyle
- Coordinates: 39.86756°N 79.49823°W
- Area: 100 acres (40 ha)

U.S. National Natural Landmark
- Designated: 1973

Ferncliff Peninsula Natural Area is a 100-acre (40 ha) peninsula with a unique habitat with many rare and unusual, for Pennsylvania, plants. It is part of Ohiopyle State Park, near Ohiopyle, Pennsylvania. It was designated a National Natural Landmark in November 1973 and was named a State Park Natural Area in 1992. These acts will prevent all further development in the peninsula area.

== Description ==
The peninsula is created by a meander in the Youghiogheny River which flows north into Pennsylvania from West Virginia and Maryland carrying seeds from that region. The warmer microclimate inside the river gorge allows these plants to survive. It is a good example of a late successional forest in the Allegheny Mountains.

The edge of Ferncliff Peninsula Natural Area is rimmed with a 2 mile loop hiking trail of moderate difficulty that features prehistoric plant fossils along the eastern edge near Ohiopyle Falls.
