= Broad Street Historic District (Philadelphia) =

Historic district in Pennsylvania, United States

- U.S. National Register of Historic Places
- U.S. Historic district
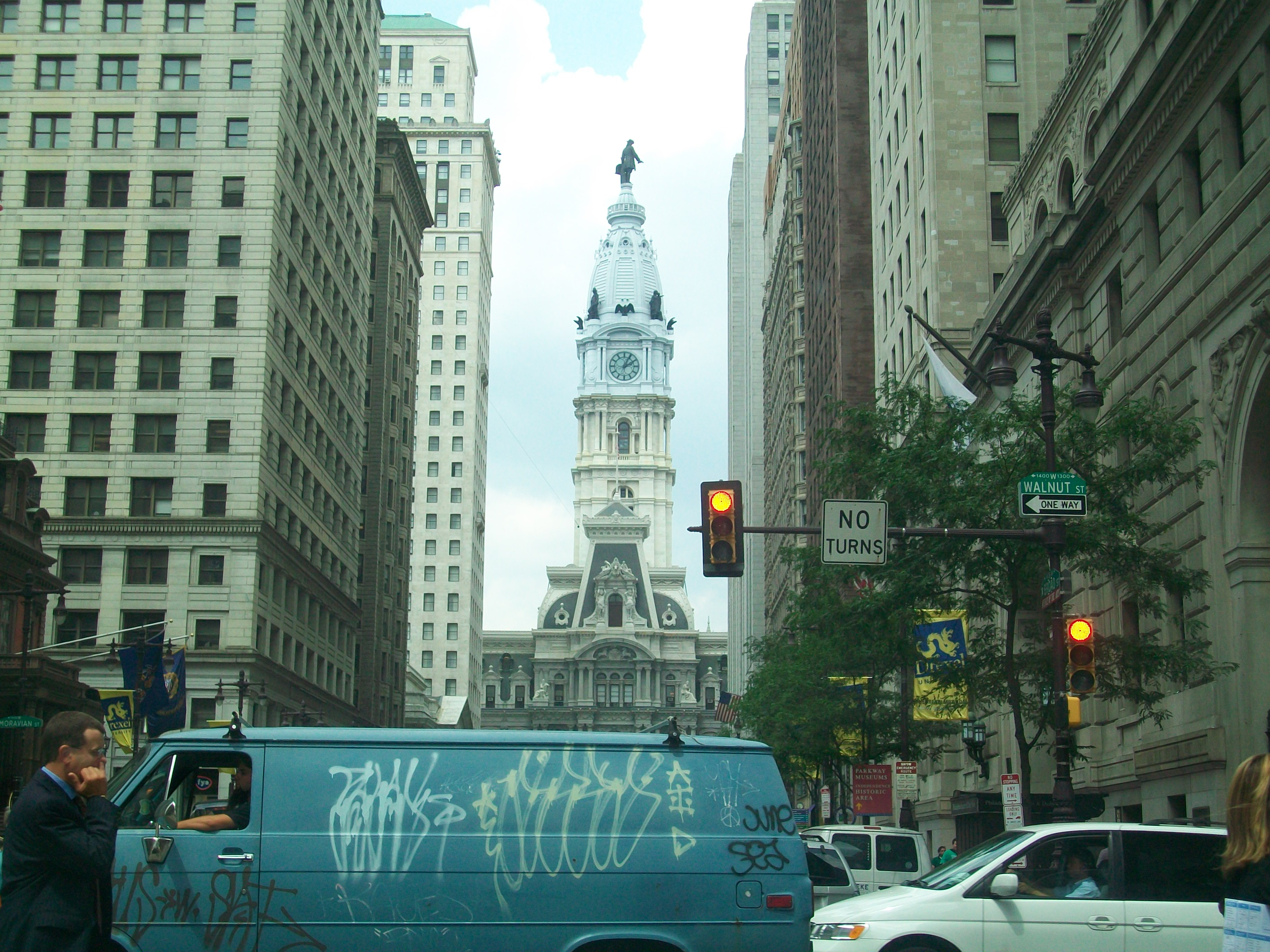
- Philadelphia City Hall from South Broad Street

- Location within Philadelphia Location within Pennsylvania Location within the United States
- Location: Roughly bounded by Juniper, Cherry, 15th, and Pine Sts., Philadelphia, Pennsylvania
- Coordinates: 39°57′3″N 75°9′51″W
- Area: 58 acres (23 ha)
- Architect: Multiple
- Architectural style: Late Victorian, Beaux Arts, Modern Movement
- NRHP reference No.: 84003529
- Added to NRHP: April 6, 1984

The Broad Street Historic District is a historic district in Center City, Philadelphia, Pennsylvania, United States. It is bounded roughly by Juniper, Cherry, 15th, and Pine Streets, covering an area about one block on either side of Broad Street.

The district was listed on the National Register of Historic Places in 1984.

== Contributing properties ==
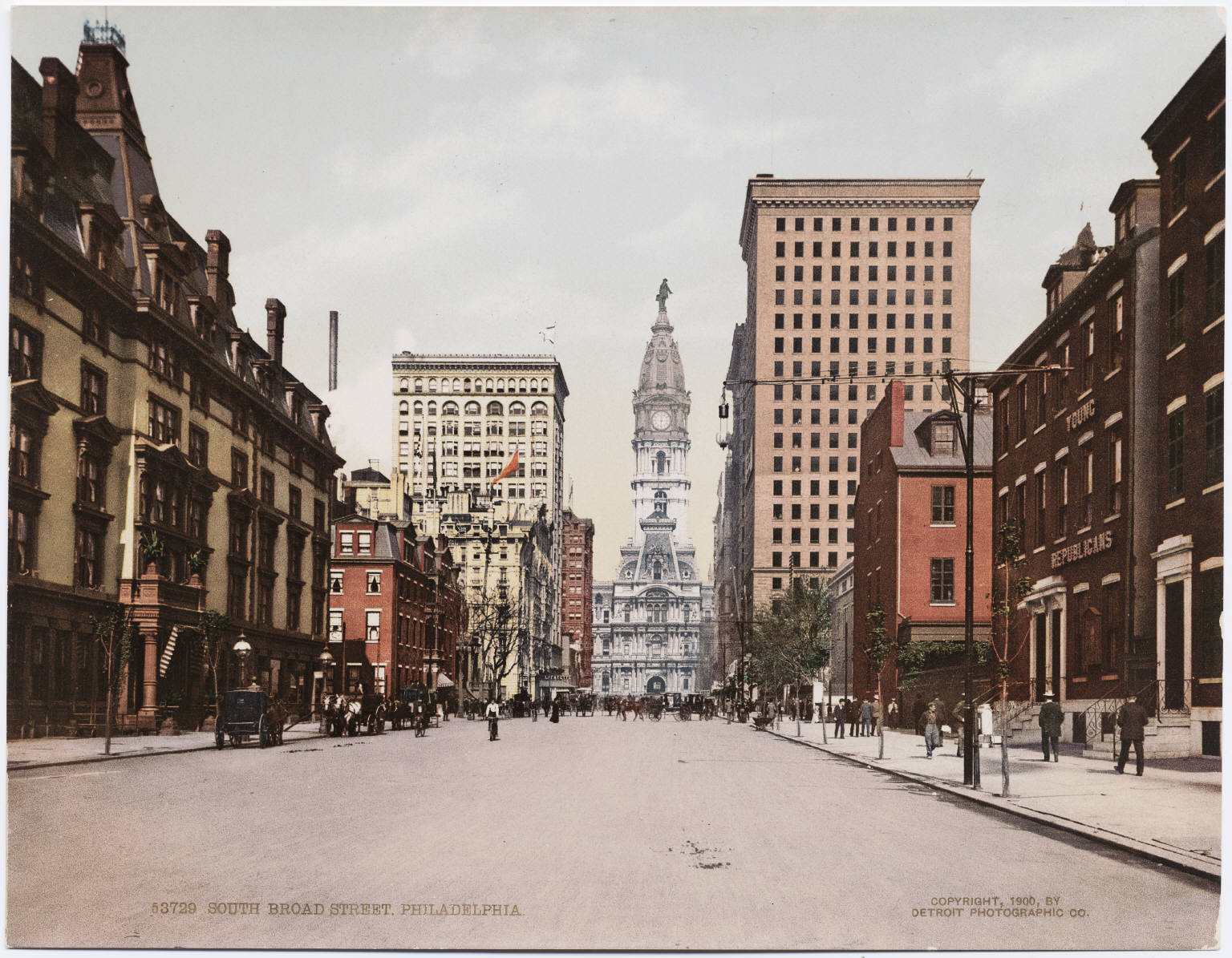
Broad Street, c. 1900

- Academy of Music (Philadelphia)
- Land Title Building
- Masonic Temple
- Pennsylvania Academy of the Fine Arts
- Philadelphia City Hall
- Philadelphia National Bank Building
- Philadelphia Stock Exchange
- Philadelphia College of Art
- Union League of Philadelphia

== See also ==
- Broad Street (Philadelphia)
