= Barton's fracture =

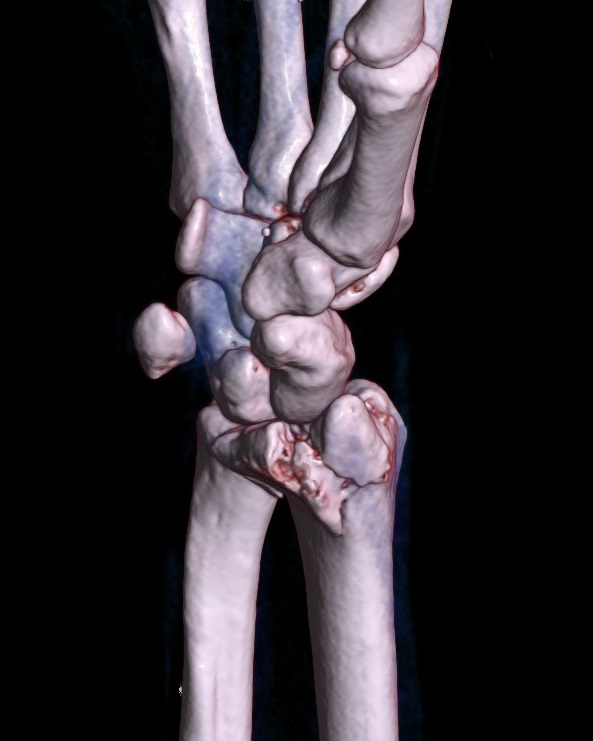
- A palmar Barton's fracture of the right wrist, as shown on a 3D-rendered CT scan
- Specialty: Orthopedic

A Barton's fracture is a type of wrist injury where there is a broken bone associated with a dislocated bone in the wrist, typically occurring after falling on top of a bent wrist. It is an intra-articular fracture of the distal radius with dislocation of the radiocarpal joint.

There exist two types of Barton's fracture – dorsal and palmar, the latter being more common. The Barton's fracture is caused by a fall on an extended and pronated wrist increasing carpal compression force on the dorsal rim. Intra-articular component distinguishes this fracture from a Smith's or a Colles' fracture. Treatment of this fracture is usually done by open reduction and internal fixation with a plate and screws, but occasionally the fracture can be treated conservatively.

== Causes ==
The most common causes of Barton's Fracture differ depending on the patient population. The majority of Barton fractures in children and young adults are caused by sports and motor vehicle accidents. The most common cause of this is a direct, traumatic wrist injury. 70% of Barton's fracture cases are caused by young male workers or motorcycle riders. However, decreased bone density caused by osteoporosis means that less force is required to cause this injury in the elderly, particularly women. As a result, most of these fractures are caused by a fall while standing.

== Eponym ==
It is named after John Rhea Barton (1794–1871), an American surgeon who first described this in 1838.

== Additional images ==
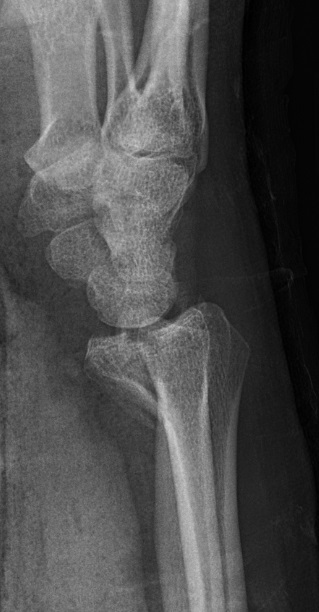
Lateral projectional radiograph of the same fracture
