= John Jacob Astor IV =

American businessman and Titanic passenger (1864–1912)

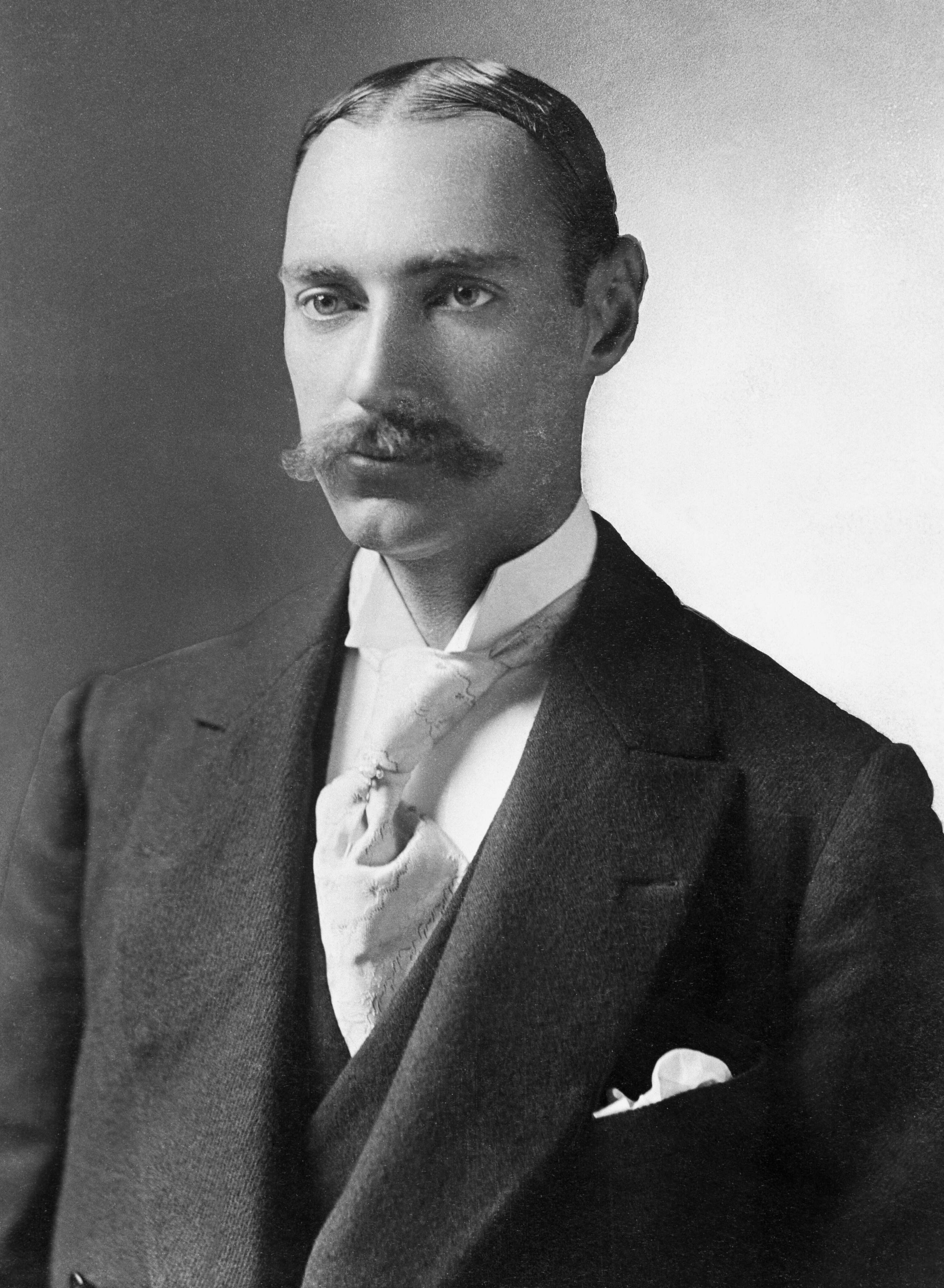
- Astor in 1895
- Born: July 13, 1864; Rhinebeck, New York, U.S.
- Died: April 15, 1912 (aged 47); North Atlantic Ocean
- Cause of death: Sinking of the Titanic
- Burial place: Trinity Church Cemetery; New York City, U.S.
- Education: St Paul's School; Harvard University
- Occupation: Business magnate
- Spouses: Ava Lowle Willing (m. 1891; div. 1910); Madeleine Talmage Force (m. 1911)
- Children: William Vincent Astor; Ava Alice Muriel Astor; John Jacob Astor VI
- Parent(s): William Backhouse Astor Jr. Caroline Webster "Lina" Schermerhorn
- Relatives: Astor family; Livingston family
- Military career
- Allegiance: United States
- Branch: New York State National Guard; United States Army
- Service years: 1894–1896 (Guard); 1898 (U.S. Volunteers)
- Rank: Colonel; Brevet Colonel
- Units: Staff of Governor Levi P. Morton; Fifth Army Corps
- Conflicts: Spanish–American War; Siege of Santiago
- Awards: Spanish Campaign Medal

John Jacob Astor IV (July 13, 1864 – April 15, 1912) was an American business magnate, real estate developer, and investor who was a member of the Astor family and also the Livingston family. A writer, as well as a lieutenant colonel in the Spanish–American War, he was among the most prominent American passengers aboard RMS Titanic and perished along with 1,495 others when the ship sank on her maiden voyage. Astor was the richest passenger aboard the RMS Titanic and was thought to be among the richest people in the world at that time, with a net worth of roughly $87 million (equivalent to $3.0 billion in 2026) when he died.

== Early life, education, and family ==
John Jacob Astor IV was born on July 13, 1864, at his parents' country estate of Ferncliff in Rhinebeck, New York. He was the youngest of five children and only son of William Backhouse Astor Jr., a businessman, collector, and racehorse breeder/owner, and Caroline Webster "Lina" Schermerhorn, a Dutch-American socialite. His four elder sisters were Emily, Helen, Charlotte, and Carrie.

John was a great-grandson of German–American fur-trader John Jacob Astor and Sarah Cox Todd, whose fortune made the Astor family one of the wealthiest in the United States. Astor's paternal grandfather William Backhouse Astor Sr. was a prominent real estate businessman. Through his paternal grandmother, Margaret Alida Rebecca Armstrong, Astor was also a great-grandson of Senator John Armstrong Jr. and Alida Livingston of the Livingston family. His maternal grandparents were Abraham Schermerhorn, a wealthy merchant, and socialite Helen Van Courtlandt White. His sister Helen's husband was diplomat James Roosevelt "Rosey" Roosevelt, half-brother of President Franklin Delano Roosevelt of the Roosevelt family. Another sister, named Carrie, was a noted philanthropist and the wife of Marshall Orme Wilson (brother of banker Richard Thornton Wilson Jr. and socialite Grace (née Wilson) Vanderbilt). Astor was also a first cousin of William Waldorf Astor, 1st Viscount Astor, with whom his mother had a notorious feud resulting in William's removal to England.

Astor attended St Paul's School in Concord, New Hampshire, and later attended Harvard College. He went by the name "Jack". His ungainly appearance and the perception that he was an aimless dilettante led one newspaper to give him the name "Jack Ass-tor".

== Career ==
Among Astor's accomplishments was A Journey in Other Worlds (1894), a science-fiction novel about life in the year 2000 on the planets Saturn and Jupiter. He also patented several inventions, including a bicycle brake in 1898, a "vibratory disintegrator" used to produce gas from peat moss, and a pneumatic road-improver, and he helped develop a turbine engine.

Like generations of Astors before him, he also made millions in real estate. In 1897, Astor built the Astoria Hotel, "the world's most luxurious hotel", in New York City, adjoining the Waldorf Hotel owned by Astor's cousin and rival, William. The complex became known as the Waldorf-Astoria Hotel. The Waldorf-Astoria would later be the host location to the U.S. inquiries into the sinking of the RMS Titanic, on which Astor died.

=== Military service ===
Astor Battery on parade, January 1899

From 1894 to 1896, he was a colonel on the military staff of New York Governor Levi P. Morton. Shortly after the outbreak of the Spanish–American War in 1898, Astor personally financed a volunteer artillery unit known as the "Astor Battery", which served in the Philippines. In May 1898, Astor was appointed a lieutenant colonel in the U.S. Volunteers and served as an officer on the staff of Major General William Shafter in Cuba, during the Santiago Campaign. He was later given a brevet (war/temporary promotion) to colonel in recognition of his services. He was mustered out of the Volunteer Army in November 1898.

During the war, he allowed his yacht Nourmahal to be used by the U.S. government. He appeared in the films President McKinley's Inspection of Camp Wikoff (1898) and Col. John Jacob Astor, Staff and Veterans of the Spanish–American War (1899). As a result of his military service, Astor was entitled to the Spanish Campaign Medal. After the war, Astor was often referred to as "Colonel Astor."

Astor was a member of several military and hereditary societies. He was an early member of the New York Society of Colonial Wars and was assigned membership number 138. He was also a member of the Military Order of Foreign Wars, Society of the Army of Santiago de Cuba, and the Society of the American Wars of the United States.

== Personal life ==
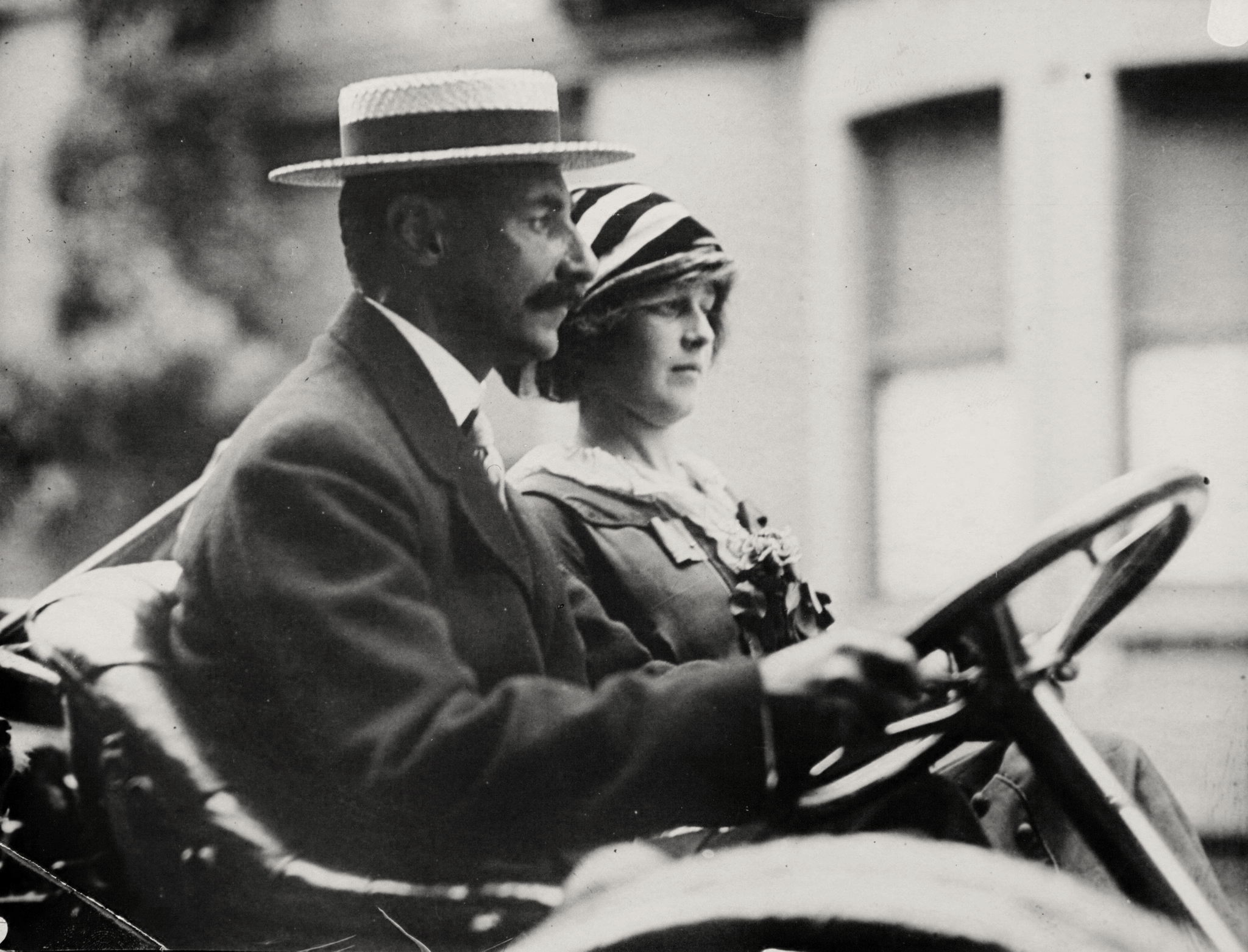
Astor and his second wife Madeleine Talmage Force

On February 17, 1891, Astor married socialite Ava Lowle Willing, a daughter of Edward Shipped Willing. The marriage produced two children:

- William Vincent Astor (November 15, 1891 – February 3, 1959)
- Ava Alice Muriel Astor (July 7, 1902 – July 19, 1956)

Astor and Willing divorced in November 1909. Compounding the scandal of their divorce was Astor's announcement that he would remarry. On September 9, 1911, the 47-year-old Astor married 18-year-old socialite Madeleine Talmage Force, the sister of real estate businesswoman and socialite Katherine Emmons Force, and daughter of William Hurlbut Force and Katherine Arvilla Talmage. Astor and Force were married in his mother's ballroom at Beechwood, the family's Newport, Rhode Island, mansion. There was also much controversy over their 29-year age difference. Their marriage produced one child, who was born during the months following Astor's death:

- John Jacob Astor VI (August 14, 1912 – June 26, 1992)

Astor's son by his first wife, Vincent Astor, reportedly despised his new stepmother; despite this Vincent served as best man at his father's wedding.

The couple took an extended honeymoon in Europe and Egypt to wait for the gossip to calm down. Among the few Americans who did not spurn him at this time was Margaret Brown, later fictionalized as The Unsinkable Molly Brown. She accompanied the Astors to Egypt and France. After receiving a call to return to the United States, Brown accompanied the couple back home aboard RMS Titanic.

=== Residence ===
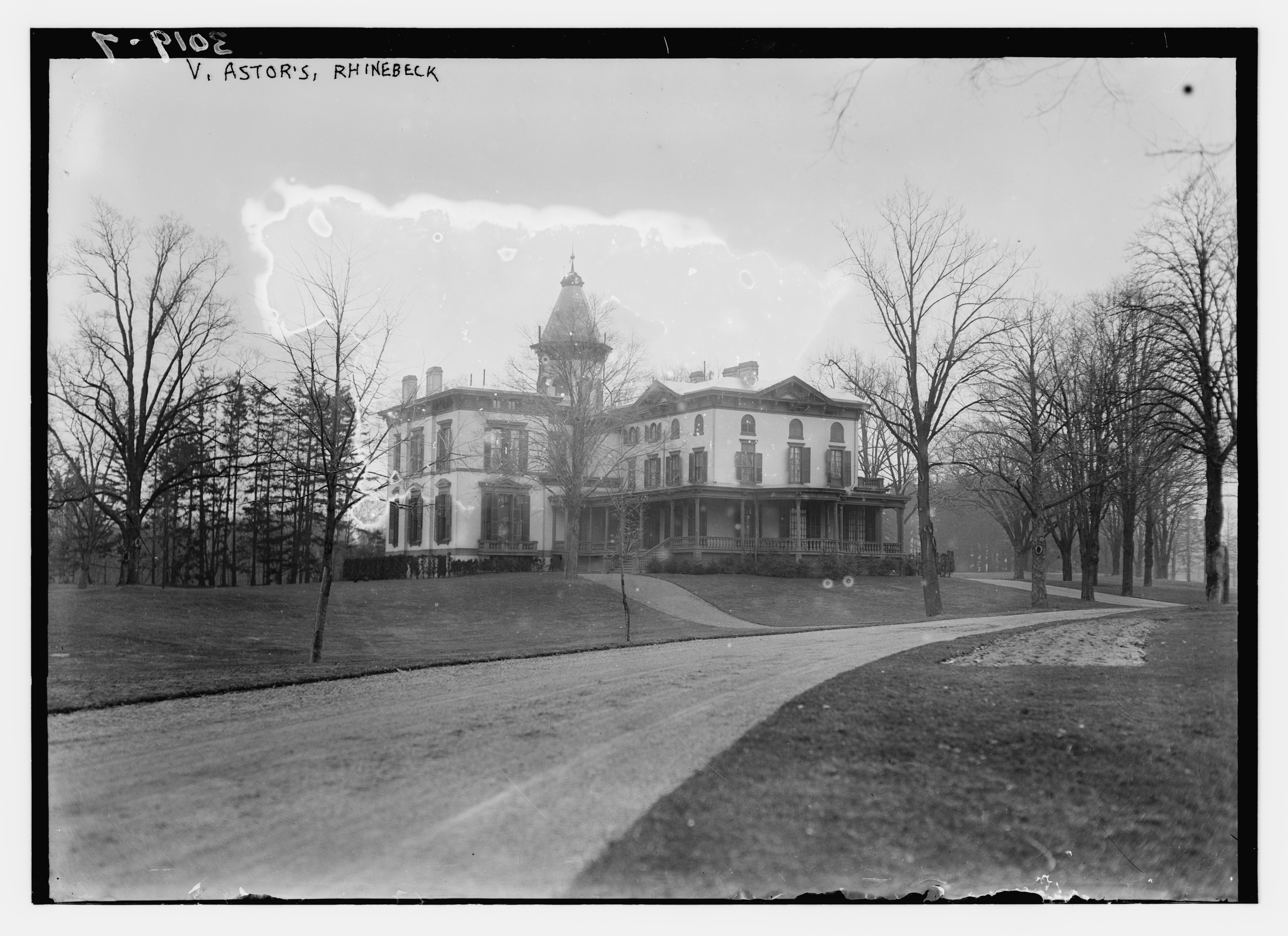
Ferncliff, the Astor family's country estate in Rhinebeck, New York

Astor's country estate, Ferncliff, was north of the town center in Rhinebeck, New York, with 1 1/2 miles (2.5 kilometers) of Hudson River frontage in the picturesque Lower Hudson River Valley. The land had been purchased piecemeal by his father during the mid 19th century. Astor was born there.

His father's Italianate mansion of 1864 was partly rebuilt in 1904 to designs by Stanford White of McKim, Mead & White. The house retained its conservative exterior, and a separate sports pavilion in the Louis XVI style was built. This was Stanford White's last project before he died.

The "Ferncliff Casino" sports pavilion (later called "Astor Courts") reportedly housed the first residential indoor swimming pool in the U.S., an indoor tennis court with vaulting of Guastavino tile, two squash courts, and guest bedrooms. On the lower level, there was a bowling alley and a shooting range.

The estate was reduced to 50 acres (200,000 m^{2}) and was renamed "Astor Courts", eventually becoming a wedding venue.

=== Pastimes ===
Astor was an avid yachtsman. Not only did he participate in many regattas but he also offered trophies for sailing races. In 1898, after the long-running Goelet Cup for yacht races in Newport had been discontinued, Astor offered new prizes to the New York Yacht Club where he was a member. They were called the Astor Cups.

== Titanic ==
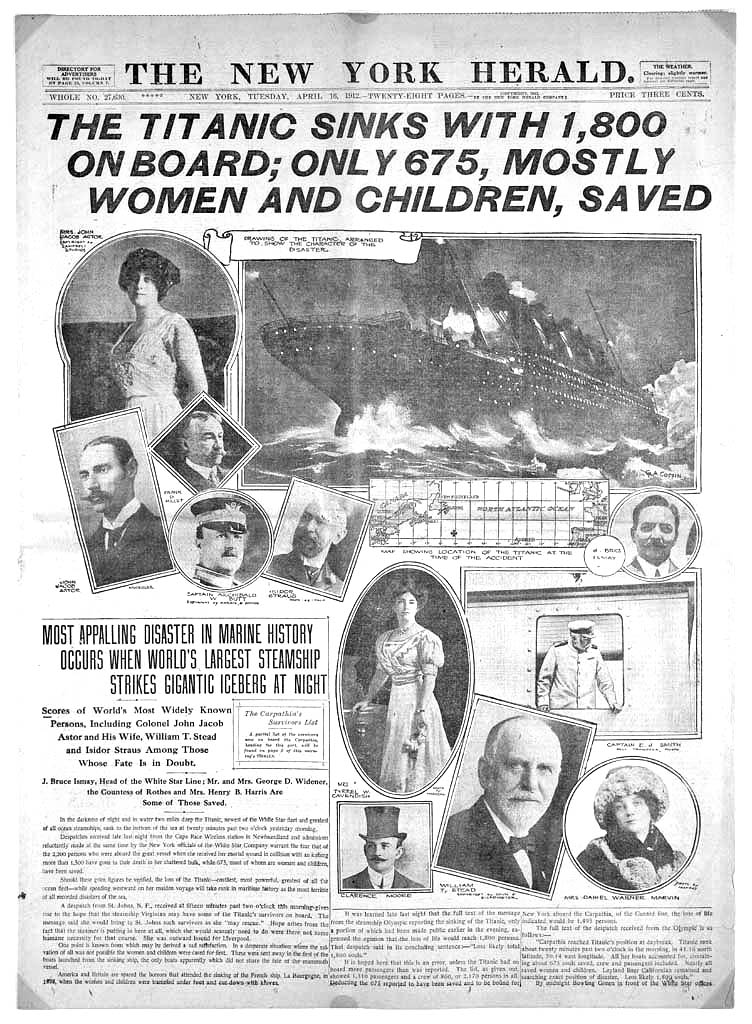
The New York Herald report of the sinking of Titanic. Most reports featured the Astors in the headlines.

While traveling, Madeleine Force Astor became pregnant. Wanting the child born in the U.S., the Astors boarded Titanic on her maiden voyage to New York. They embarked in Cherbourg, France via the SS Nomadic, in first class and were the wealthiest passengers aboard. Accompanying the Astors were Astor's valet, Victor Robbins; Mrs. Astor's maid, Rosalie Bidois; and her nurse, Caroline Louise Endres. They also took their pet dog, an Airedale Terrier named Kitty. The Astors were deeply fond of their dog and had come close to losing her on a previous trip when she went missing in Egypt. Kitty did not survive the sinking. They had met up with Margaret "Molly" Brown traveling through Egypt. According to Edith Rosenbaum, Astor pointed out some vital statistics of the ship, and said, "She's unsinkable, a modern shipbuilding miracle."

On April 14, when Captain Edward J. Smith attended a large dinner party in B Deck restaurant, Salon Steward Thomas Whiteley stated that Smith "talked and joked with Mr Astor. Shortly after Titanic hit the iceberg, Isaac Frauenthal saw Astor approach Captain Smith and tell him, "Captain, my wife is not in good health. She has gone to bed, and I don't want to get her up unless it is absolutely necessary. What is the situation?" Smith advised Astor to awaken his wife, as they might have to take to the boats. Astor "never changed expression...thanked the Captain courteously and walked rapidly, but composedly away". Astor informed his wife of the collision but told her the damage did not appear to be serious. He and his wife and other passengers talked about the collision with the iceberg. Some time later, as the ship's lifeboats were being manned, Astor remained unperturbed; he and his wife played with the mechanical horses in the gymnasium. At some point Astor is thought to have sliced open the lining of an extra lifebelt with a pen knife to show his wife its contents, either to prove they were not of use or to reassure her that they were. He even declared: "We are safer here than in that little boat."

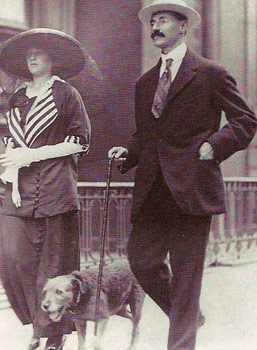
Astor with his wife, Madeleine Force Astor, and their Airedale, Kitty

At boat No. 7, Astor and his wife were about to board when Astor drew back and pulled his wife back with him. Someone said something to Astor, but it is unknown what was said. On A Deck, Lily May Peel saw Astor smoking a cigarette with Jacques Futrelle. When Second Officer Charles Lightoller later arrived on A Deck to finish loading Lifeboat 4, Astor helped his wife, with her maid and nurse, into it. He then asked if he might join his wife because she was in "a delicate condition;" however, Lightoller told him men were not to be allowed to board until all the women and children had been loaded. Astor did not protest, and simply kissed his wife, telling her that he would follow in another boat. According to Titanic passenger Archibald Gracie IV, who also helped Astor's wife into the boat:

She was lifted up through the window, and her husband helped her on the other side, and when she got in, her husband was on one side of this window and I was on the other side, at the next window. I heard Mr Astor ask the second officer whether he would not be allowed to go aboard this boat to protect his wife. He said, "No, sir, no man is allowed on this boat or any of the boats until the ladies are off." Mr. Astor then said (something to the effect of) "Well, tell me the number of this boat so I may find her afterwards" and was told "Number 4."

A news article posted in the Chicago Record Herald tells of Astor placing his wife into the final lifeboat then ordering Ida Sophia Hippach and her 17-year-old daughter Jean Gertrude to take the final two places before the boat was lowered away. 11-year old Master Elias Nicola-Yarred and his 14-year-old sister Jamilia also made it to the boat, stating that Astor turned to help other passengers into the boat, including Yarred and his sister. After Lifeboat 4 was lowered at 1:55 am, Astor is said to have stood with John B. Thayer, Harry Elkins Widener and Arthur Ryerson, waving. Titanic sank at 2:20 a.m, on April 15. Madeleine Force Astor, her nurse, and her maid survived. Colonel John Jacob Astor, his valet, Victor Robbins, Kitty and Futrelle perished.

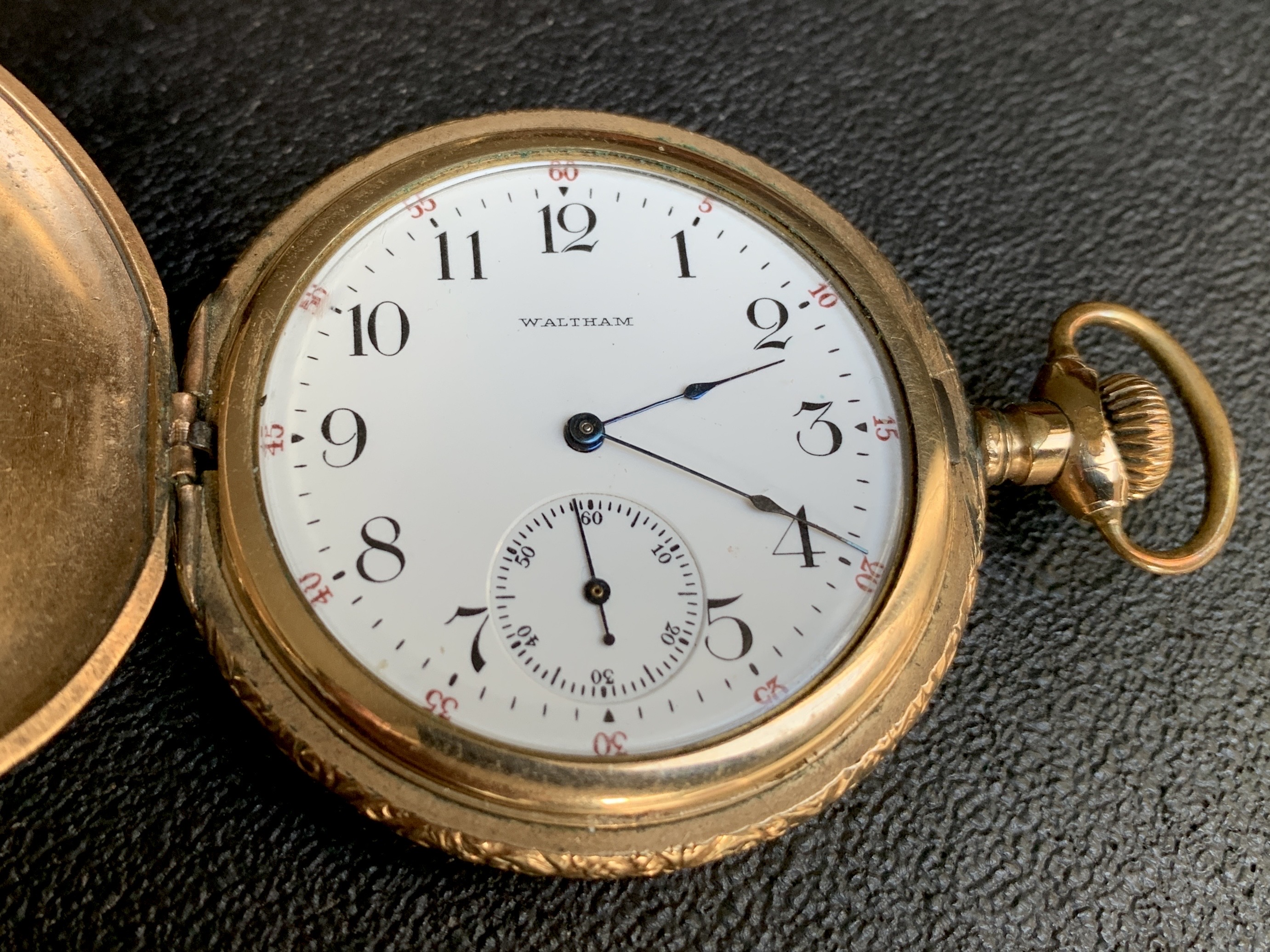
Gold Waltham pocket watch similar to the one Astor wore aboard RMS Titanic

In the aftermath, ships were sent out to retrieve the bodies from the site of the sinking; of the 1,517 passengers and crew who perished in the sinking, only 333 bodies were ever recovered. Astor's body was recovered on April 22 by the cable ship Mackay-Bennett. Astor was identified by the initials sewn on the label of his jacket. Among the items found on him was a gold pocket watch, which his son Vincent claimed and wore the rest of his life. It was later reported that "in 1935, Vincent gave the watch as a christening gift to the infant son of William Dobbyn IV, John Jacob Astor's executive secretary". The pocket watch was sold for £1.175 million at auction on April 27, 2024.

NO. 124 – MALE – ESTIMATED AGE 50 – LIGHT HAIR & MOUSTACHE.

CLOTHING – Blue serge suit; blue handkerchief with "A.V."; belt with gold buckle; brown boots with red rubber soles; brown flannel shirt; "J.J.A." on back of collar.

EFFECTS – Gold watch; cuff links, gold with diamond; diamond ring with three stones; £225 in English notes; $2440 in notes; £5 in gold; 7s. in silver; 5 ten franc pieces; gold pencil; pocketbook.

FIRST CLASS. NAME- J.J. ASTOR IV

In his memoir, Gracie claimed that he heard Astor's body was in a crushed condition; this led to popular belief that Astor may have been one of the swimmers killed by the first funnel falling from the ship. This is disputed by John Snow, an undertaker aboard the ship, who said that the body was in an 'excellent state of preservation', and Captain Richard Roberts, the commander of Astor's yacht, who said that apart from some slight discolouration by water, Astor's features were unharmed. Gerald Ross, an electrician on the Mackay-Bennett, reported that Astor's "face was swollen, one jaw was injured." Author Tim Maltin writes that Astor's jaw injury was relatively slight and could have been caused by his lifebelt, if he jumped from the Titanic, or by other drowning passengers or debris as the ship sank. Among the more dubious accounts, Dr. Washington Dodge says he saw Astor standing with Archibald Butt near the bridge as the ship went down. Dodge's account is highly unlikely, as his lifeboat was more than 0.5 miles (0.80 km) away from the ship at the time it sank. Survivor Philip Mock was quoted as claiming to have seen Astor in the water clinging to a raft with W. T. Stead. "Their feet became frozen," said Mock, "and they were forced to release their hold. Both were drowned."

Astor was buried in Trinity Church Cemetery in Manhattan, New York City. Four months after Titanic sank, Madeleine Astor gave birth to his second son, John Jacob "Jakey" Astor VI.

== Estate ==
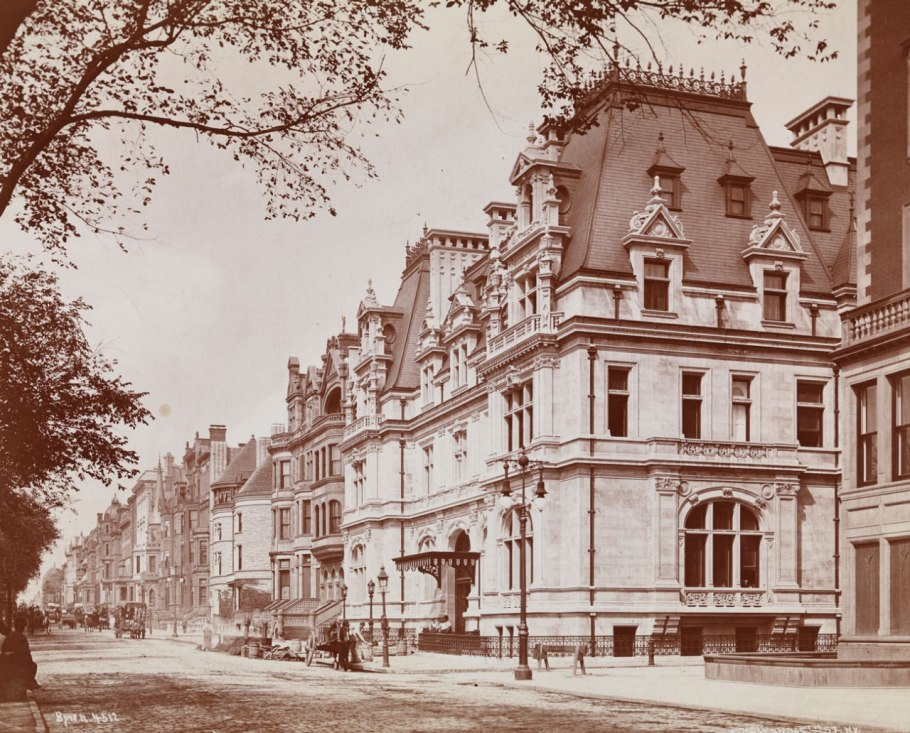
840 Fifth Avenue in Manhattan

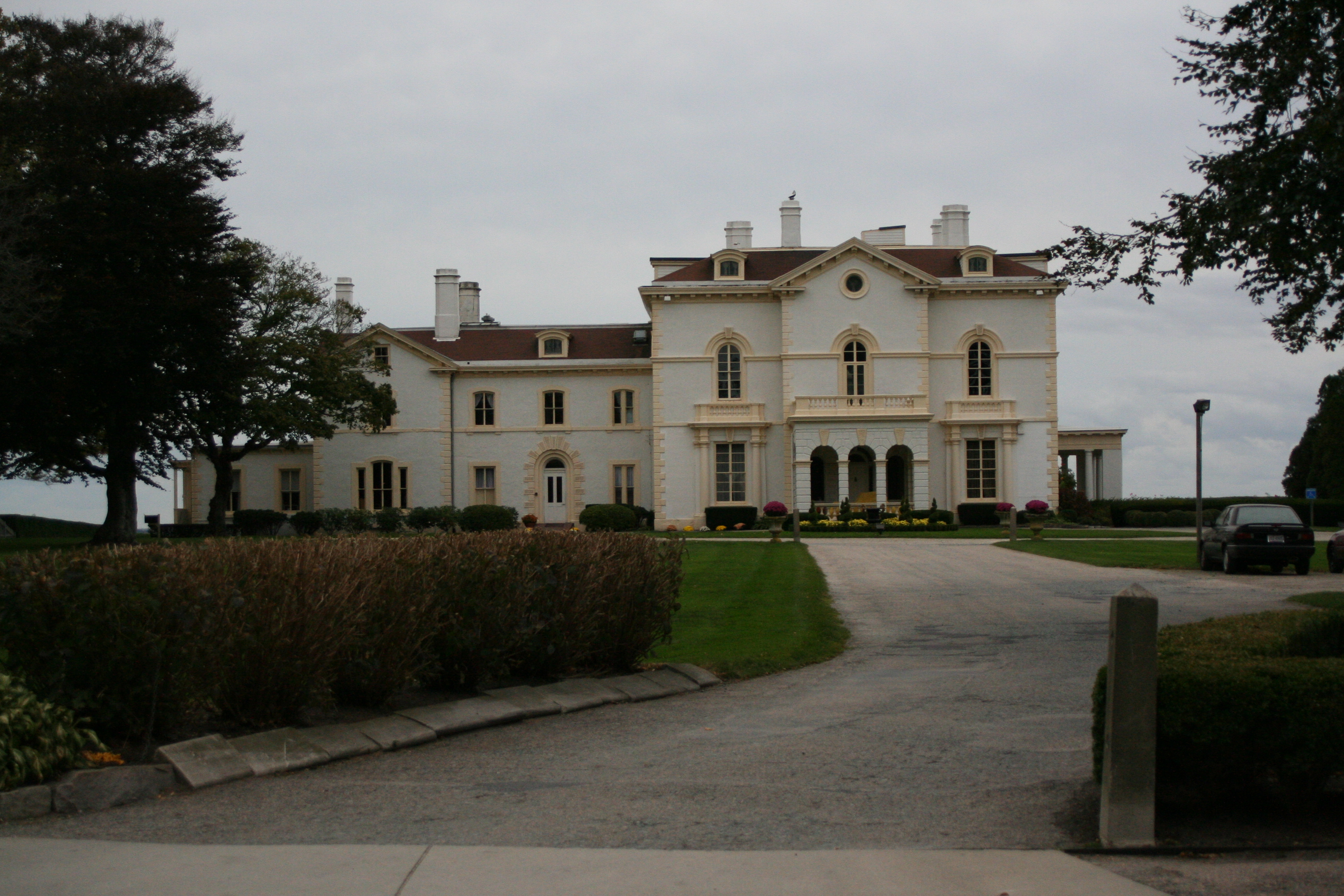
Beechwood, the Astors' summer home in Newport, Rhode Island

Astor left $69 million of his $85 million estate (US$2.84 billion in 2025) to Vincent. This value included his Ferncliff country estate in Rhinebeck, New York, and his yacht, the Noma.

To Madeleine Force Astor, he left $100,000 (US$3.34 million in 2025) as an outright bequest, as well as a $5 million trust fund (US$167 million in 2025) from which she was provided an income. Additionally, she was given the use of his New York City mansion (840 Fifth Avenue in Manhattan) and all its furnishings, his Newport mansion (Beechwood) and all its furnishings, the pick of whichever luxury limousine she wanted from his collection, and five of his prized horses—as long as she did not remarry.

His daughter Ava (who lived with her mother, also named Ava) received a $10 million trust fund (US$334 million in 2025). Upon turning 21, John Jacob VI inherited the $3 million trust fund Astor had set aside for him (US$100 million in 2025).

== Portrayals ==
On screen, Astor has been portrayed by:

- Karl Schönböck (1943) Titanic
- William Johnstone (1953) Titanic
- Gordon Mills (1955) You Are There: The Sinking of the Titanic (TV episode, 22 May 1955)
- Peter Pagan (1956) Kraft Television Theatre: A Night to Remember
- David Janssen (1979) S.O.S. Titanic (TV movie)
- Scott Hylands (1996) Titanic (miniseries)
- Eric Braeden (1997) Titanic
- Federico Zambrano (2003) Ghosts of the Abyss (documentary)
- Miles Richardson (2012) Titanic; TV series/3 episodes)
- Astor was portrayed by his great-grandson Gregory Todd Astor in an April 2012 production of the Broadway musical Titanic.
- Brittany Daley (2022) Titanic 666

== Sources ==
- Fitch, Tad; Layton, J. Kent; Wormstedt, Bill (2012). On A Sea of Glass: The Life & Loss of the R.M.S. Titanic. Amberley Books. ISBN 978-1848689275.
