= Ferncliff Forest =

Old-growth forest in New York, US

Coordinates: 41.956°N 73.925°W

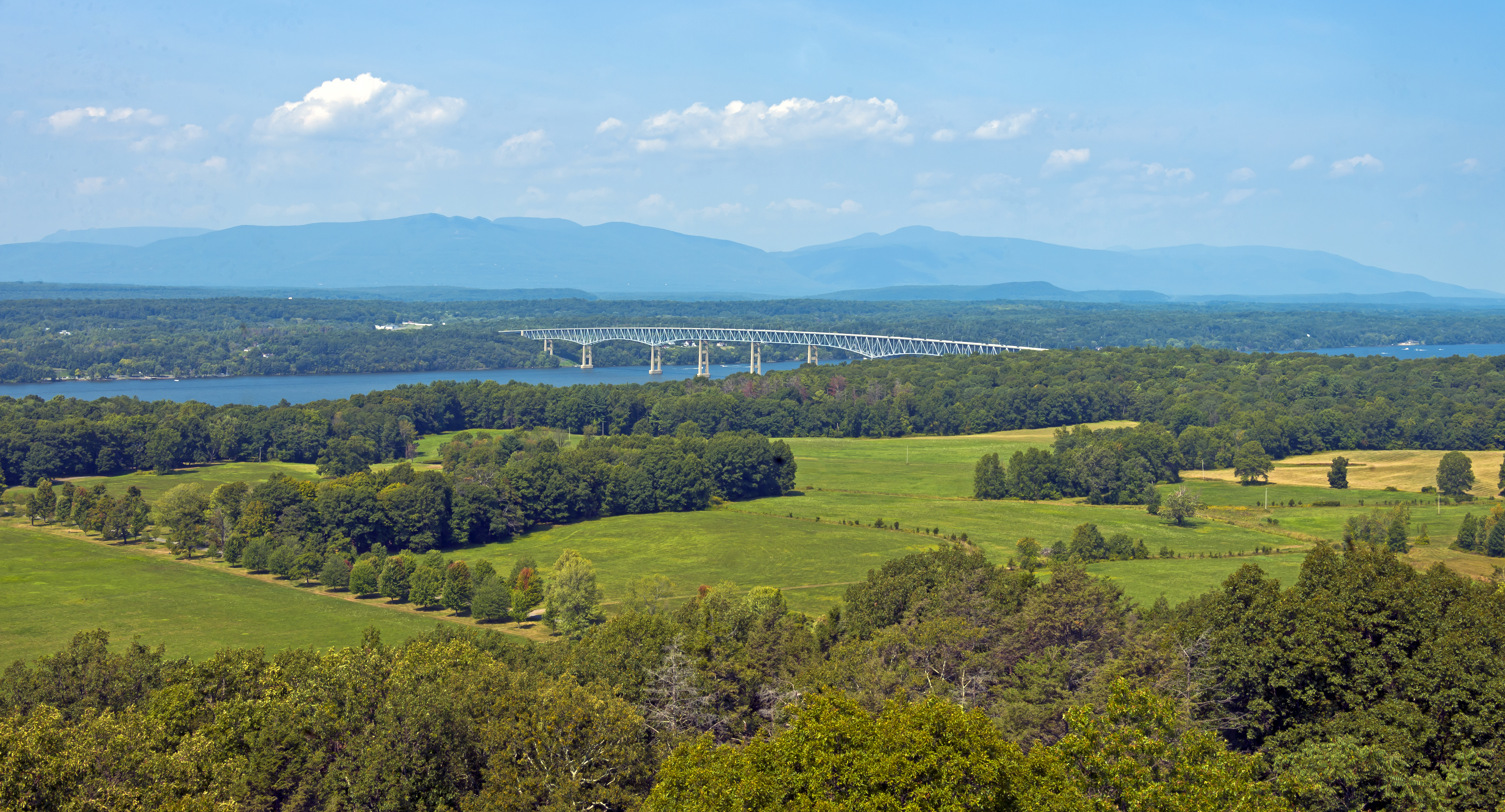
View of the Catskill Escarpment, the Kingston–Rhinecliff Bridge and the Hudson River from a tower at the Ferncliff Forest preserve

Ferncliff Forest is a 200-acre (0.81 km^{2}) old-growth forest preserve of deciduous and hemlock trees located in Rhinebeck, a town in the northern part of Dutchess County, New York, US. The property had been bought in 1900 by John Jacob Astor IV and remained in the Astor family until 1964, when it was donated as a forest preserve and game refuge.

The preserve is maintained by a private nonprofit organization. Observation towers on the property were used for map-making, surveillance for President Franklin Delano Roosevelt's home during World War II, and recreational sight-seeing. Visitors can camp and hike the four miles (6.4 km) of trails free-of-charge.

The most recently built observation tower in Ferncliff Forest measures 80 feet (24 m) tall, with 109 steps. It was erected in 2007, the first since 1941 in New York. In 1942, during World War II, the observation towers in Ferncliff Forest were manned by soldiers from the United States Army Air Forces 24 hours a day. The newest tower was constructed as a gift to the community for recreational purposes including hiking and mountain biking with an intricate trail system.

== History ==
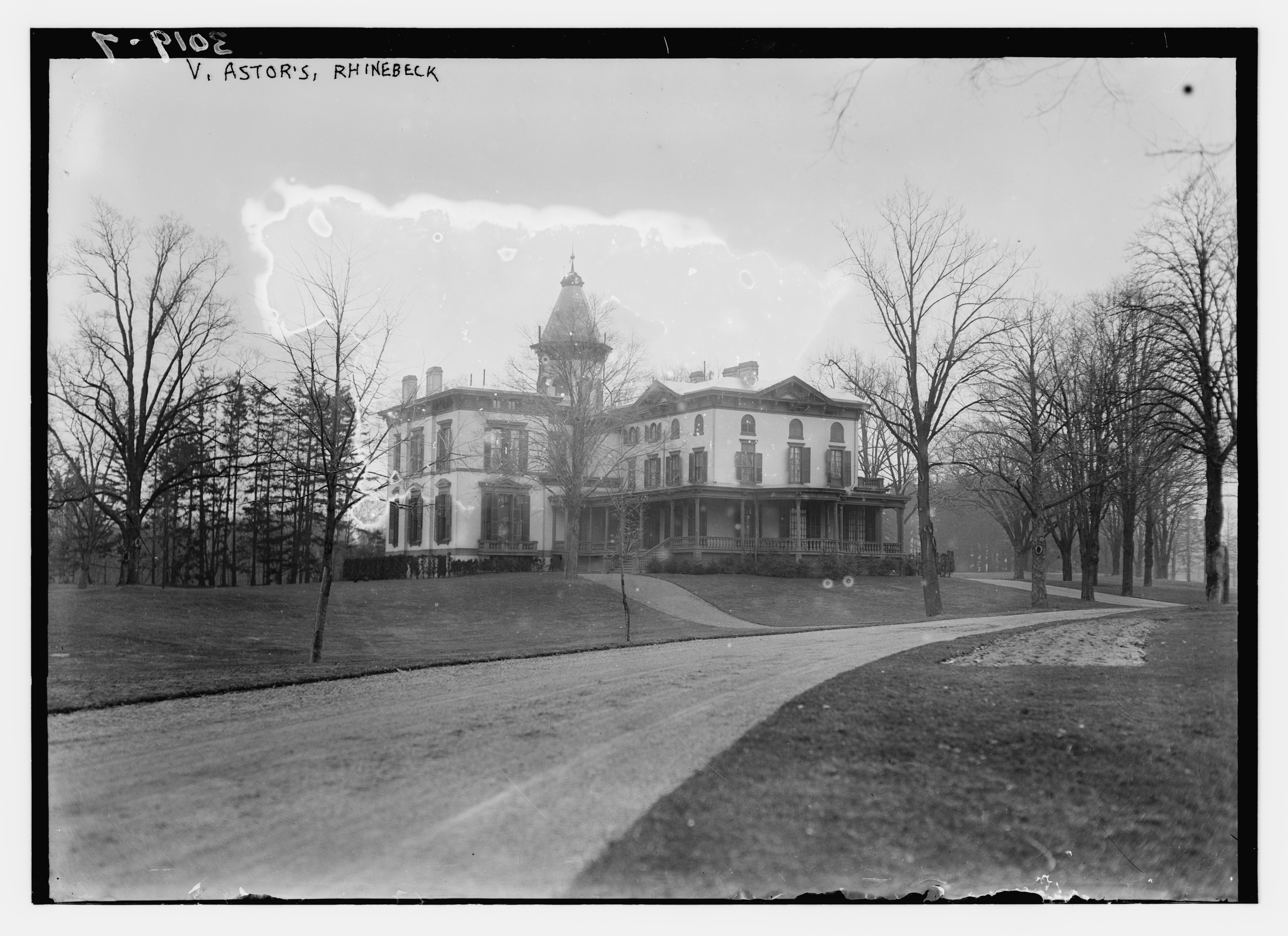
The Astor family's Ferncliff mansion, shown c. 1910 and demolished during the 1940s

Before the establishment of Ferncliff Forest, individual farms made up the landscape of the Hudson River's east bank. In 1853, William Backhouse Astor Jr. purchased several of these farms. His mother, Margaret Rebecca Armstrong, had grown up a few miles north of this area, at Rokeby. A neighboring property of 125 acres (0.51 km^{2}) was owned by Thomas Suckley and hosted a farm colony. This property was later donated to the Methodist Church as a retreat for members of the clergy, becoming known as the "Mount Rutsen" farm colony.

When the farm colony was failing in 1900, 106 acres (43 ha) were sold to John Jacob Astor IV for $5,500, adding to the property that he already owned. After Astor's death on the Titanic in 1912, his Ferncliff Farm property was inherited by his elder son, Vincent Astor, who continued to expand the property by purchasing adjacent land. By 1940, Vincent Astor owned 2,800 acres (11 km^{2}) reaching down to the Hudson River.

After the death of Vincent Astor in 1959, Ferncliff Farm was left to his third wife, Brooke Astor. In 1963, she was asked by the Rhinebeck Rotary club's president, Homer Staley Sr., to donate the "Mount Rutsen" part of Ferncliff Farm's remaining land to the club as a forest preserve and game refuge. She made the donation in 1964, with the stipulation that the land remain "forever wild".

In 1972, the Rhinebeck Rotary club formed a 501(c)(3) organization named Ferncliff Forest, Inc. This nonprofit organization is controlled by a board of directors and relies completely on donations for funding, which was a wish of its founder, Homer Staley Sr.

=== The towers ===
At the highest point of Ferncliff Forest, 350 feet (107 m) above sea level, an old stone observation tower was built by the Astors. Finally, the second tower was built during World War II by the United States Army Corps of Engineers for the United States Coast and Geodetic Survey to help with map-making and as a watch tower. This enclosed tower contained a telephone as well as utilities for full-time occupation so that enemy planes could be spotted. This tower was particularly useful in watching out for planes attempting to attack President Roosevelt's home and those approaching New York City. After the war, the tower became a popular attraction and was purely recreational. In 2006, the tower was deemed unsafe, and it was replaced in 2007 by the current observation tower.

=== Recent developments ===
Ferncliff Forest was featured in The New York Times in a 2008 article about scenic views of the Hudson Valley, along with four other locations along the river.

In 2010, restoration efforts began to clean and improve the health of a 100-year-old pond in the forest. Weeds had made the pond uninhabitable for fish. Previous projects had cost Ferncliff over $200,000, and in 2014, the park began another round of weed removal in the pond. Workers had dug out a 1.5-acre (0.61 ha) area to place the weeds, to be turned into a field as part of the preserve.

In November 2015, an annual 5 km race benefited Ferncliff Forest, raising money for maintaining the preserve. The first race, known as the "Turkey Trot", occurred in 2008. The route begins at Northern Dutchess Hospital in Rhinebeck and ends at the forest.

== See also ==
- Catskill Mountains
- Forest Preserve (New York)
