= Romuleon =

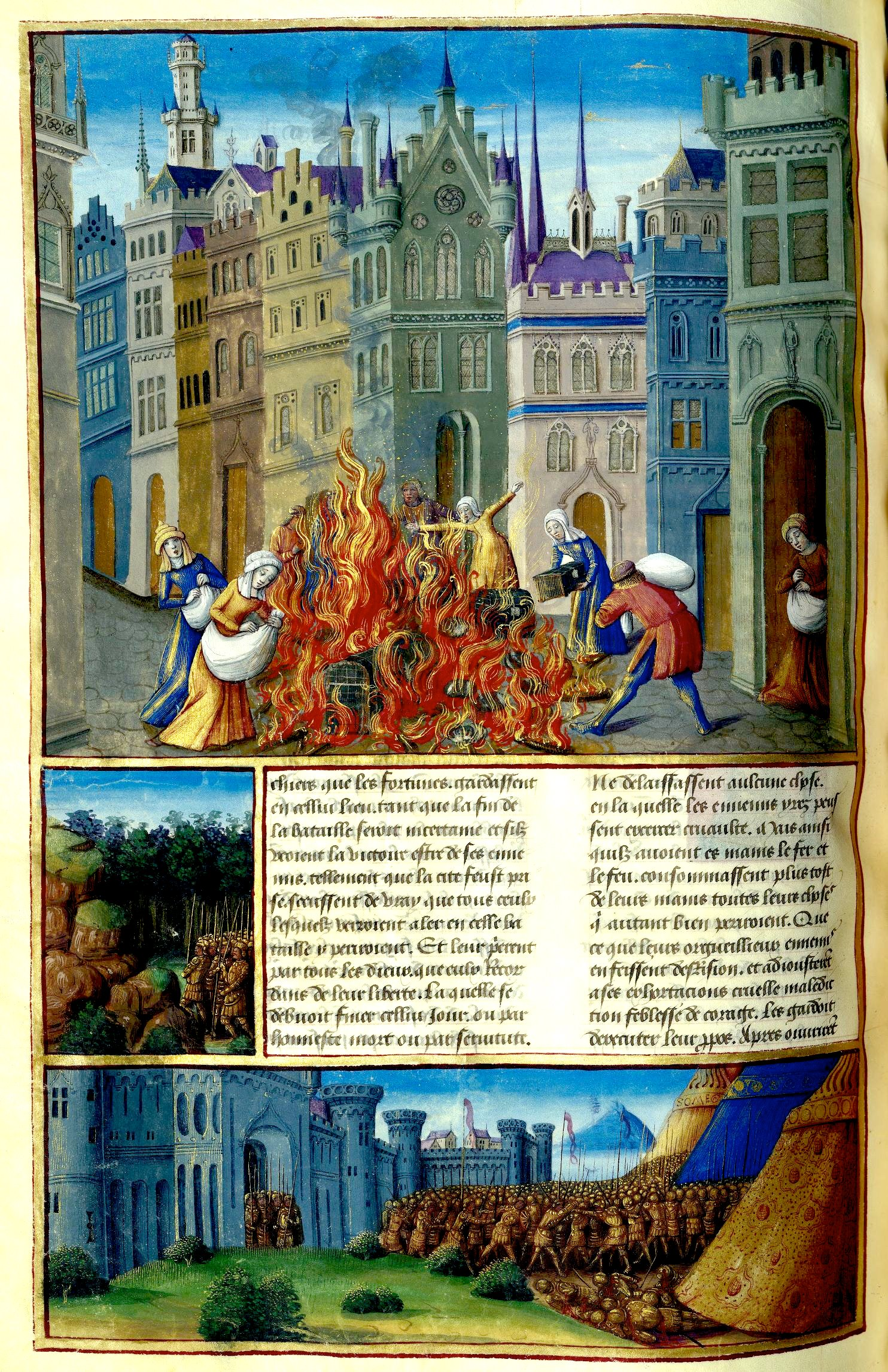
Depiction of the Battle Of Astapa in the Romuleon

The Romuleon was a Latin work describing the history of Rome, compiled by Benvenuto da Imola in the mid-fourteenth century from a number of earlier texts.

It was later translated into French by two separate writers:

- The Romuléon of Jean Miélot, made in 1460 for Philip the Good.
- The Romuléon of Sébastien Mamerot, made in 1466 for Louis de Laval, seigneur de Châtillon.

A second Latin version was produced by Adamo Montaldo in the 1490s.

Mamerot's translation was published in a modern edition in 2000.
