= Jugon =

Jugon may refer to:

- Jugon-les-Lacs, a commune in Brittany
- Jugon-les-Lacs, a delegated commune in Brittany
- Jugon, Japanese name of the Pokémon Dewgong
