= George Venables-Vernon, 5th Baron Vernon =

British politician

The Right Honourable The Lord Vernon
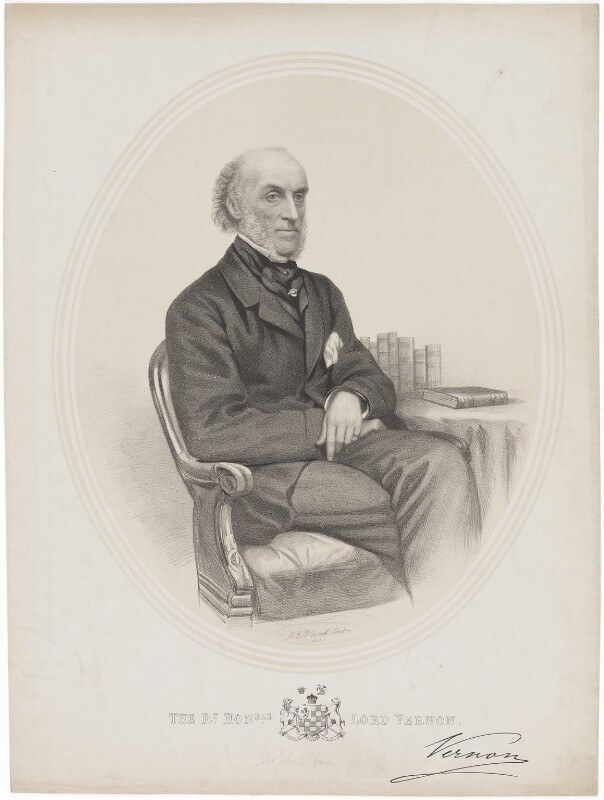
- 1861 lithograph of Vernon

Personal details
- Born: 22 June 1803 Stapleford Hall, Nottinghamshire
- Died: 31 May 1866 (aged 62) Sudbury Hall
- Spouse: Isabella Caroline
- Children: 5, including William Warren
- Parent(s): George Charles Vernon; Frances Maria Warren

George John Warren Venables-Vernon, 5th Baron Vernon (22 June 1803 – 31 May 1866), was a British politician. He was one of the last members of parliament for Derbyshire and the first for South Derbyshire. Vernon had a lifetime enthusiasm for Italian literature, particularly Dante after visiting Italy as a child. Vernon county is named after him in Australia.

== Early life and education ==
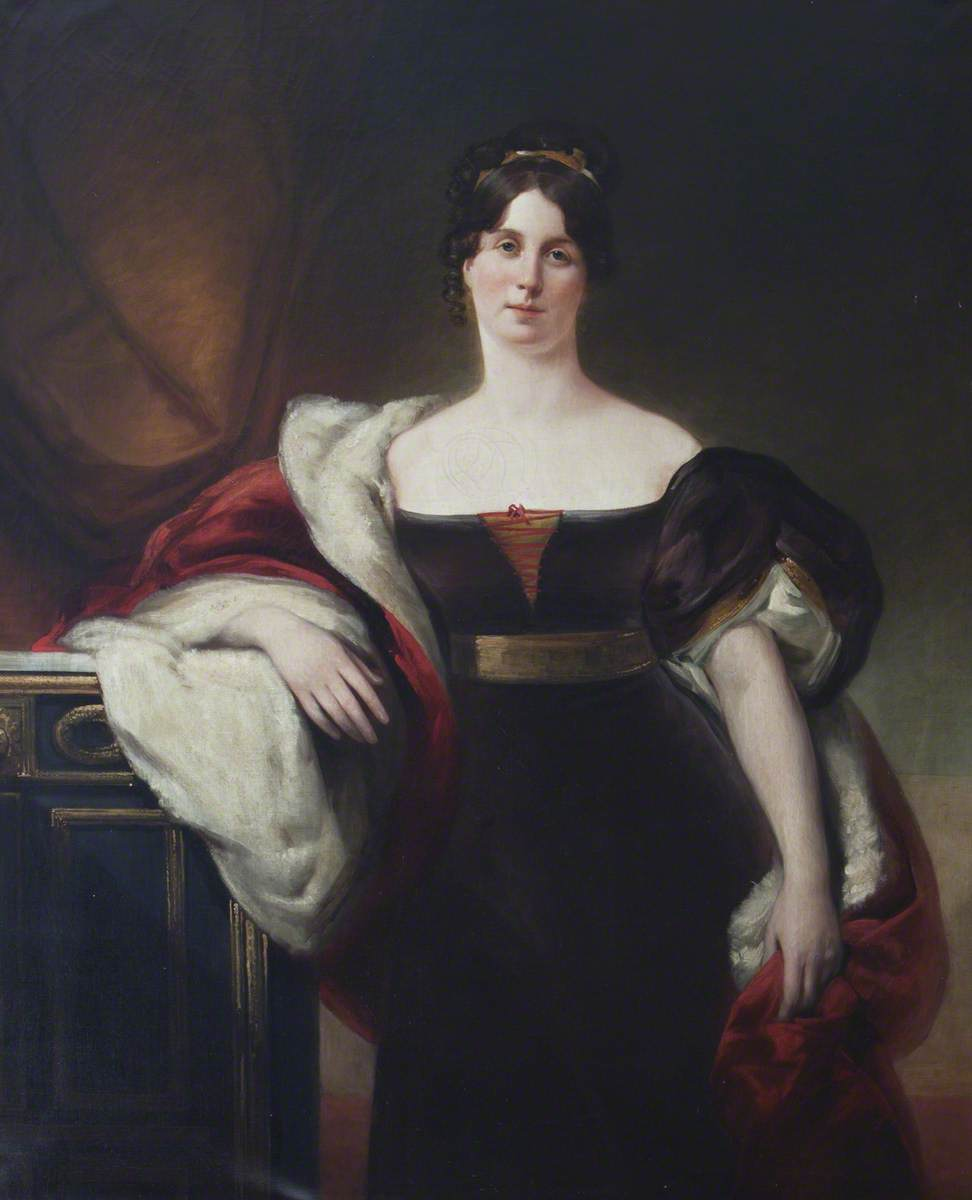
Portrait of his mother, Frances Maria Warren, between c. 1820 and c. 1830

Vernon was born at Stapleford Hall in Nottinghamshire, the only son of George Charles Venables-Vernon, 4th Baron Vernon (1779–1835) of Sudbury, Derbyshire, and Frances Maria Warren, only daughter of Admiral Sir John Borlase Warren. Sir Richard Vernon, Speaker of the House of Commons from 1425 to 1426, was an ancestor. He was educated at Eton College and Christ Church, Oxford.

== Career ==
Vernon was commissioned as Captain of the Burton-on-Trent Troop of the Staffordshire Yeomanry on 5 June 1830. In October 1832 he rushed up from London when he heard that his Troop had been called out to Derby, where serious rioting had occurred. He resigned his commission in 1839.

He was an expert rifle-shot and an energetic supporter of the Volunteer movement for which he raised the 2nd (Sudbury) Derbyshire Rifle Volunteer Corps of two companies on 16 March 1860.

=== Politics ===
Vernon entered public life in 1831, as Member of Parliament for Derbyshire. As a result of the passing of the Reform Bill in 1832 (which Vernon supported) the parliamentary seat for Derbyshire was divided in two, and he became MP for the southern part. He continued in the House of Commons until 1835, when he succeeded his father as Baron Vernon and entered the House of Lords. In 1837, he exchanged his patronymic surname Venables-Vernon for that of Warren, in compliance with the will of Viscountess Bulkeley, but his children born before 1839 retained their original surname.

=== Italy ===
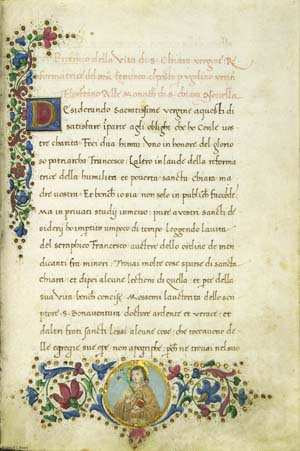
One of the many manuscripts obtained for the Baron's collection. This one is by Ugolino Verno, from 1496.

As a youth, Vernon was taken to Italy, and later returned to live in Florence, where he studied the Italian language and history. His whole life was devoted to Dante, to whom he erected a noble literary monument. With the advice and help of friends and collaborators, he printed (though not for sale) some then unedited texts and two important works. The first of these was Le prime quattro Edizioni della Divina Commedia letteralmente ristampate, London, 1858, a careful reprint of the first editions of Dante's Divine Comedy, edited by Sir Anthony Panizzi with a learned preface. This was followed by a remarkable publication, L' Inferno di Dante Alighieri disposto in ordine grammaticale e corredato di brevi dichiarazioni di G. G. Warren, Lord Vernon, London, 1858–1865, 3 vols. folio, of which only a limited number of copies were issued for private circulation.

The latter work was described by Henry Clark Barlow as one "which, for utility of purpose, comprehensiveness of design, and costly execution, has never been equalled in any country." Some of the most distinguished artists and men of letters in Italy were occupied for twenty years in its preparation. The first volume includes the text of the Inferno with many unpublished documents; and the third volume, which appeared after Lord Vernon's death, contains 112 original engravings of incidents in the Inferno, views of towns, castles, and other localities mentioned therein, as well as portraits, paintings, plans, and historical monuments illustrating the history of the fourteenth century.

=== Membership ===
Vernon was a socio correspondent of the Accademia della Crusca, and was a member of many other literary societies. He was also created Cavaliere di San Maurizio e Lazzaro in May 1865, in recognition of his labours on behalf of the national poet.

== Personal life ==
Vernon married twice. On 30 October 1824, he married his first wife, Isabella Caroline, daughter of Cuthbert Ellison of Hebburn, Durham, who bore him two sons and three daughters:

- Hon. Caroline Maria Warren Venables-Vernon (1826–1918), married the Rev. Frederick Anson, canon of Windsor and rector of Sudbury
- Augustus Henry Warren Venables-Vernon (1829–1883), succeeded as 6th Baron Vernon
- Hon. Adelaide Louisa Warren Venables-Vernon (1831–1913), married Admiral Sir Reginald Macdonald
- Hon. William John Borlase Warren Venables-Vernon (1834–1919), married Agnes Lucy Boileau, daughter of John Boileau, 1st Baronet.
- Hon. Louisa Warren Venables-Vernon (1838–1898), married the Rev. Thomas Parry Garnier

He remarried on 14 December 1859, to his cousin, Frances Emma Maria, only daughter of the Rev. Brooke Boothby, who survived him but was childless.

During his prolonged visits to Italy and Florence, Lord Vernon initiated a relationship with a young girl by the name of Louise Charlotte Anette Lavoignat who bore him four daughters: Maria Louise born 1843, Vittoria Alice born 1845, Heloise Tommasine born 1846 and Georgina Jeanne Margheret, married Augusto Agostini in Geneve on 26 November 1853. Georgina bore two sons: Corradina-Eugenia-Nelly, born in Cairo, and Paolo Alberto Raoul, born in Nizza, 25 March 1865.

After a long illness, Vernon died at Sudbury Hall, the family seat, near Derby, on 31 May 1866 aged 62.

== Publications ==
An engraved portrait of Vernon is in the album of his Inferno. Besides the two works above mentioned, he also printed :

- L'Inferno, secondo il testo di B. Lombardi con ordine e schiarimento per uso dei forestieri di L. V., Florence, 1841, 8vo (only the first seven cantos; a foreshadowing of his great work on the 'Inferno').
- Petri Allegherii super Dantis ipsius genitoris comoediam commentarium, Florence, 1846, 8vo (edited by Vincenzo Nannucci).
- Chiose sopra Dante, testo inedito, ora per la prima volta pubblicato, Florence, 1846, 8vo (commonly known as II falso Boccaccio).
- II Febusso e Breusso, poema ora per la prima volta pubblicato, Florence, 1847, 8vo (a romanzo cavalleresco).
- Chiose alia Cantica dell' Inferno di Dante Allighieri attribuite a Jacopo suo figlio, Florence, 1848, 8vo.
- Comento alia cantica di Dante Allighieri di autore anonimo, Florence, 1848, 8vo (the oldest commentary on the Inferno in existence, probably written about 1328). He had intended to print the famous Latin commentary of Benvenuto da Imola, delivered as public lectures at Bologna about 1375; but this work was carried out by his second son, William Warren Vernon, in 1887, 5 vols. 4to, under the editorship of Sir J. P. Lacaita.

== See also ==
- The Divine Comedy

Parliament of the United Kingdom
Preceded by Francis Mundy; Lord George Cavendish	Member of Parliament for Derbyshire; 1831–1832; With: Lord George Cavendish	Constituency abolished
New constituency	Member of Parliament for South Derbyshire; 1832–1835; With: Lord Waterpark	Succeeded by Sir George Harpur Crewe; Sir Roger Gresley
Peerage of Great Britain
Preceded by George Charles Venables-Vernon	Baron Vernon; 1835–1866	Succeeded by Augustus Henry Venables-Vernon
