= Anne-Marie Orveillon =

Café owner who saved Jewish boys during the Holocaust

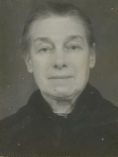
- Anne-Marie Orveillon, circa 1942
- Born: Anne-Marie Gouvary; January 29, 1888
- Died: August 30, 1964 (aged 76)

Anne-Marie Orveillon (née Gouvary, January 29, 1888 – August 30, 1964) was a Breton and French activist who saved two Jewish boys during the Holocaust. She was posthumously recognized as one of the Righteous Among the Nations.

== Biography ==
Not much is known of her early life. She married a man named Orveillon. She owned a café and grocery store in Jugon Les Lacs in Brittany. Her niece Geneviève lived with her.

Two Jewish boys, Roland and Gérard Moryoussef, who had been born in Algeria, fled Paris and ended up in Jugon Les Lacs, where Orveillon sheltered them beginning in October 1941. Their mother and elder brother were deported to and murdered in Auschwitz. They lived with an aunt briefly, but returned to Orveillon's house and café, where they lived until the liberation of Paris in August 1944; while they lived with Orveillon, the boys were integrated and educated while keeping their names.

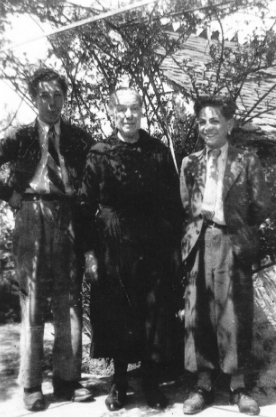
Orveillon with Roland (left) and Gérard Moryoussef (right), who she hid during the Holocaust.

The honor of belonging to the Righteous Among the Nations was bestowed upon her in 2009, and her name is recorded on the wall of the just in the garden. Her name is also included on the Wall of the Righteous at the Mémorial de la Shoah in Paris.
