= Romuléon (Miélot) =

15th-century history of Rome by Jean Miélot

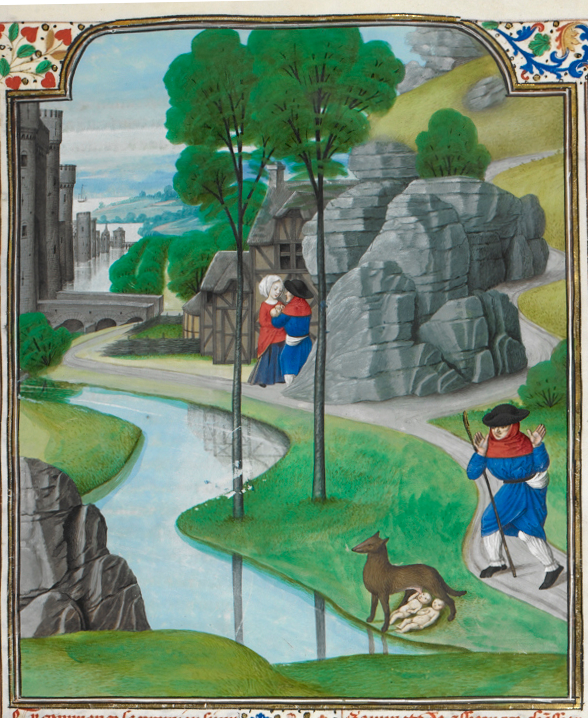
Romulus and Remus depicted at the start of Book I (BL Royal MS 19 E v)

The Romuléon is a fifteenth-century French text by Jean Miélot, telling the history of Rome from its legendary foundation by Romulus and Remus up to the emperor Constantine.

== Origins ==
The Romuléon was translated into French beginning in 1460 by Jean Miélot, an author in the service of Philip the Good, Duke of Burgundy. Miélot was assigned the role ‘de translater, escrier et historier les livres de Monseigneur’ (‘to translate, write out and "historiate" (either to narrate or adorn) the books of my Lord,’ i.e., the duke). His Latin source was a work, also called the Romuleon, compiled in Florence between 1361 and 1364, by Benvenuto da Imola. The preface of this Latin work states that the compilation was taken up at the request of Gomez Albornoz, the governor of Bologna. This source in turn was based on a number of classical texts, including Livy's Ab Urbe Condita and the Lives of Suetonius. Miélot's translation should not be confused with a second French Romuléon translation, undertaken by Sébastien Mamerot in 1466.

== Manuscripts ==
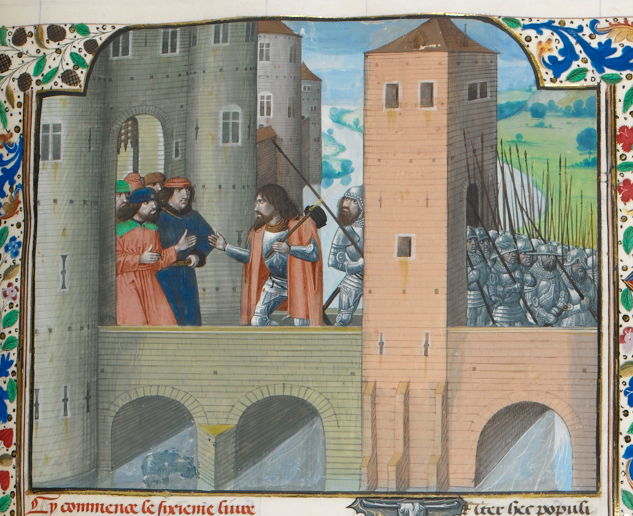
Scipio Africanus leaving Rome with his army (BL Royal MS 19 E v)

The Romuléon is extant in seven manuscripts (one incomplete), all of them illuminated:

- Besançon, Bibliothèque Municipale, MS 850: Owned by Philip the Good, who purchased it in 1467.
- Brussels, Bibliothèque Royale, MS 9055: Owned by Anthony of Burgundy, the illegitimate son of Philip the Good, the manuscript was produced by the scribe David Aubert in 1468.
- Brussels, Bibliothèque Royal, MSS 10173-4: Owned by Jean de Wavrin.
- Florence, Biblioteca Medicea Laurenziana, MSS Med. Pal. 1561, 1562: Dated 1464, the scribe is David Aubert, and the manuscript's illustrations have been attributed to Loyset Liédet It was likely owned by Philip the Good.
- London, British Library, Royal MS 19. E. v: Commissioned for Edward IV. While the hand is very similar to that of David Aubert, it was not written by him.
- Niort, Bibliothèque Municipale, Rés. G 2 F (olim MS 25): Incomplete; many of its miniatures have been detached and are held in other collections.
- Turin, Biblioteca nazionale Universitaria, MSS L.I.41, L.I.42: Owned by Louis, Seigneur de Gruuthuyse (Louis de Bruges).

The largest interest in the Miélot Romuléon was in the circle that had first prompted its translation, surrounding Philip the Good in the 1460s and early 1470s, and five out of the six remaining complete copies originate in this circle. The copy made for Edward IV (London, BL Royal 19. E. v) is therefore an outlier, being produced a decade later. It is part of a larger acquisition of manuscripts from the Netherlands that Edward made at this time, over the course of only a very few years, c. 1479–1480. Edward may have become interested in owning a copy of Romuléon as part of a program of imitation of Louis de Gruuthuse, whom he visited in 1470. Indeed, we know that Louis owned a copy, since it is one of those now extant, presently residing in Turin. Edward's acquisition of the Romuléon was, furthermore, part of a wider interest in texts on history and, in particular, Roman history.

== Sources ==
- Cast, David (1974). "Aurispa, Petrarch, and Lucian: An Aspect of Renaissance Translation". Renaissance Quarterly. 27 (2): 157–73. doi:10.2307/2860568. JSTOR 2860568.
- Duval, Frederic (2000). "Introduction". In Frederic Duval (ed.). Le Romuleon en François. Geneva: Librairie Droz S. A. pp. xi–lviii. ISBN 2600004173.
- Kekewich, Margaret (1971). "Edward IV, William Caxton, and Literary Patronage in Yorkist England". The Modern Language Review. 66 (3): 481–87. doi:10.2307/3723166. JSTOR 3723166.
- McKendrick, Scot (1994). "The Romuléon and the Manuscripts of Edward IV". In Nicholas Rogers (ed.). England in the Fifteenth Century: Proceedings of the 1992 Harlaxton Symposium. Harlaxton Medieval Studies. Geneva: Librairie Droz S. A. pp. 149–69. ISBN 1871615674.
