= Passages d'outremer =

Medieval French chronicle

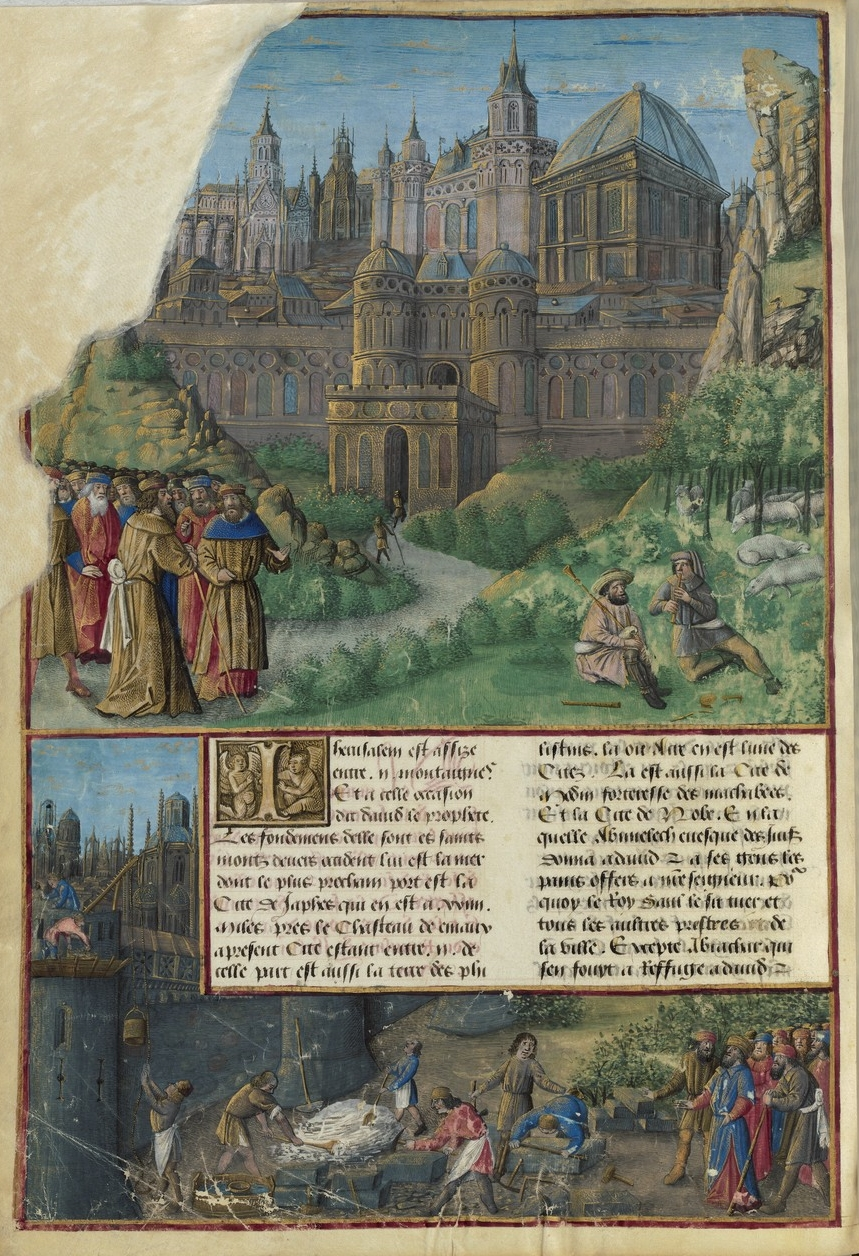
A page from BnF fr. 5594, a copy of the Passages d'outremer, depicting the city of Jerusalem

The Passages d'outremer is a chronicle of the crusades written in Middle French by Sébastien Mamerot in 1473–1474. Drawing freely on legendary material, it covers the wars between Catholics and Muslims from the time of Charlemagne until 1462.

Mamerot was the chaplain of Louis de Laval-Châtillon, governor of Genoa, who commissioned the Passages. It is divided into 88 chapters and covers 272 folios in manuscript. Its full title is Passages fais oultre mer par les François contre les Turcqs et autres Sarrazins et Mores oultre marins ('Passages made overseas by the Franks against the Turks and other overseas Saracens and Moors').

The Passages d'outremer is conserved in three 15th-century manuscripts, all today in the Bibliothèque nationale de France (BnF), numbers fr. 5594, fr. 2626 and fr. 4769. A partial edition was printed at Paris by Michel Le Noir in 1518 under the title Les passaiges d'Oultremer faitz par les Françoys. The manuscript BnF fr. 5594 is a masterpiece of manuscript illumination by Jean Colombe, containing 66 full-page miniatures. It was finished after 1488, since it contains a copy of a letter from the Ottoman sultan Bayezid II to King Charles VIII of France dated to that year.

== Editions ==
- Mamerot, Sébastien (2016). Thierry Delcourt; Fabrice Masanès; Danielle Quéruel (eds.). A Chronicle of the Crusades: The Expeditions to Outremer. An Unabridged, Annotated Edition with a Commentary. Translated by Mary Lawson; Chris Miller. Taschen.

== Bibliography ==
- Duval, Frédéric (1998). "Sébastien Mamerot". Romania. 116 (463–464): 461–491. doi:10.3406/roma.1998.1475.
- Gorgievski, Sandra (2014). "Imaginaires du paysage méditerranéen dans un traité historique des croisades: Les Passages d'Outremer de Sébastien Mamerot (XV^{e} s.)". Babel: Littératures plurielles. 30: 35–64.
- Jacob, Marie; Delcourt, Thierry (2009). "Les passages d'outremer, un chef-d'oeuvre de l'enluminure française du XVe siècle". Médiathèque numérique de l'INP.
- Lapina, Elizabeth (2019). "Crusader Chronicles". In Anthony Bale (ed.). The Cambridge Companion to the Literature of the Crusades. Cambridge University Press. pp. 11–24.
