= John Boileau =

British baronet and archaeologist (1794–1869)

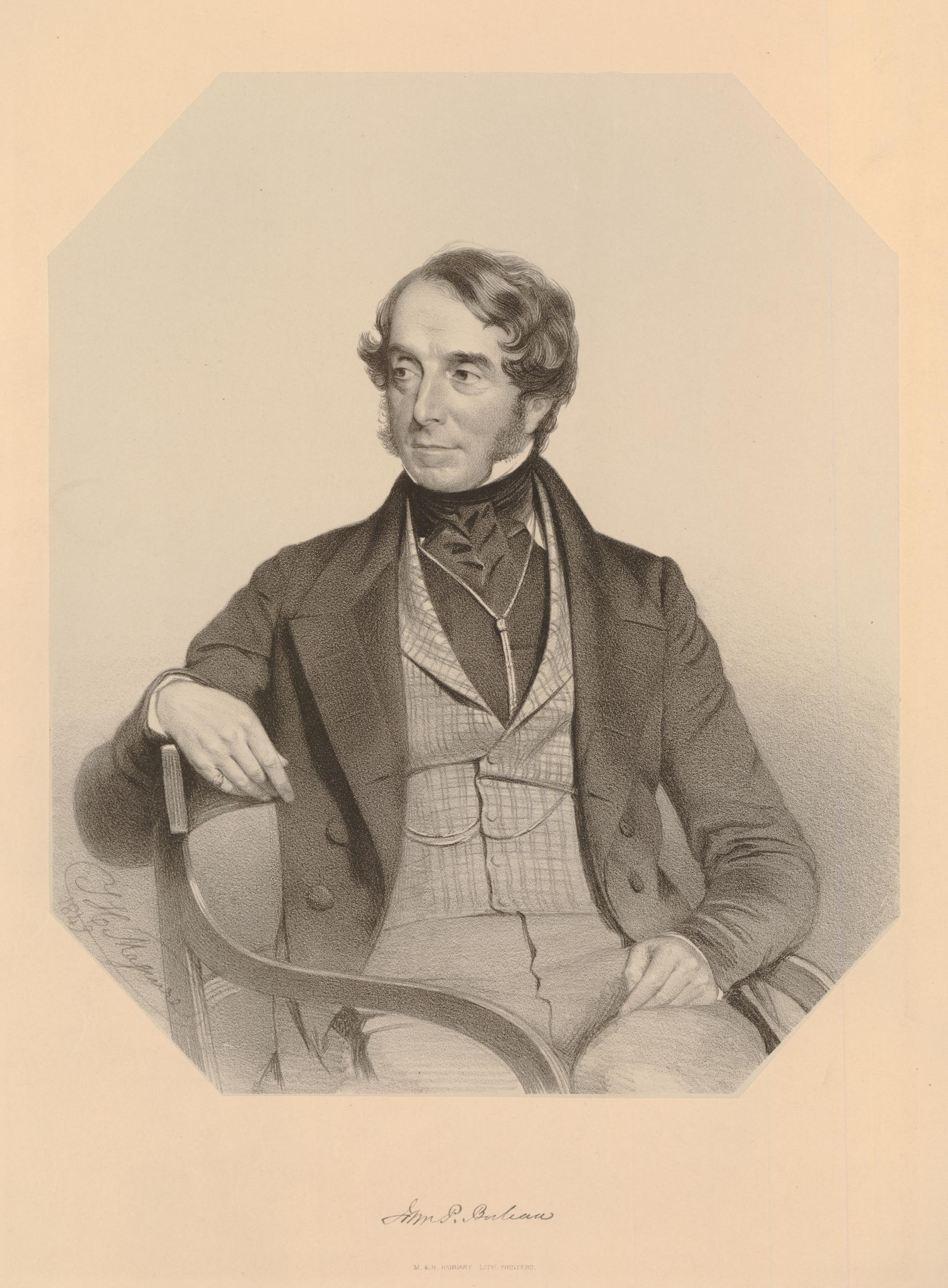
John Boileau, 1849

Sir John Peter Boileau, 1st Baronet FRS, DL, JP (2 September 1794 – 9 March 1869) was a British baronet and archaeologist. Born in London and educated at Eton College and Merton College, Oxford, he served briefly in the British Army before purchasing an estate at Ketteringham in Norfolk. Created a baronet in 1838, he became a fellow of the Royal Society in 1843 and served as High Sheriff of Norfolk in 1844. He was active in numerous learned societies, serving as president of the Norfolk and Norwich Archaeological Society and as vice-president of the Society of Antiquaries of London, the Zoological Society of London, the Royal Statistical Society, the Royal Institution, and the British Science Association, among others. He died at Torquay on 9 March 1869.

== Early life ==
Born in Hertford Street in London's district Mayfair, he was the eldest son of John Peter Boileau and his wife Henrietta Pollen, the eldest daughter of John Pollen. His family claimed descendancy of Étienne Boileau, one of the first known provosts of Paris. He was educated at Eton College and went then to Merton College, Oxford. In 1813, Boileau joined the British Army and was commissioned as 2nd lieutenant into the Rifle Corps, which his uncle Coote Manningham had established. After four years service, he was put on halfpay in 1817. He bought an estate in Ketteringham in 1836, which he later expanded with a Gothic hall.

== Career ==
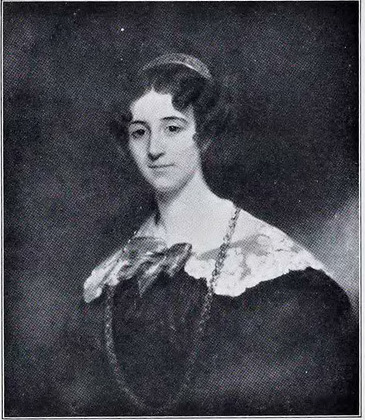
Lady Catherine Boileau, portrait by Margaret Carpenter

In 1838, Boileau was created a baronet, of Tacolnestone Hall, in the County of Norfolk. He was elected a fellow of the Royal Society in 1843 and was appointed High Sheriff of Norfolk in 1844. When one year later the Norfolk and Norwich Archaeological Society was founded, Boileau was nominated one of its vice-presidents until 1849, after which he became the Society's president. He joined the Society of Antiquaries of London in 1852 and by the recommendation of Philip Stanhope, 5th Earl Stanhope, he was chosen a vice-president in 1858, a post he occupied for seven years with only a break in 1863. Boileau was additionally vice-president of the Zoological Society of London and of the Royal Statistical Society. He served in the same capacity for the Institute of Archaeology and for the Royal Society of Arts. Boileau further held a fellowship in the Geological Society of London and was vice-president of the Royal Institution as well as the British Science Association. He represented Norfolk both as a deputy lieutenant as well as a justice of the peace.

== Personal life ==
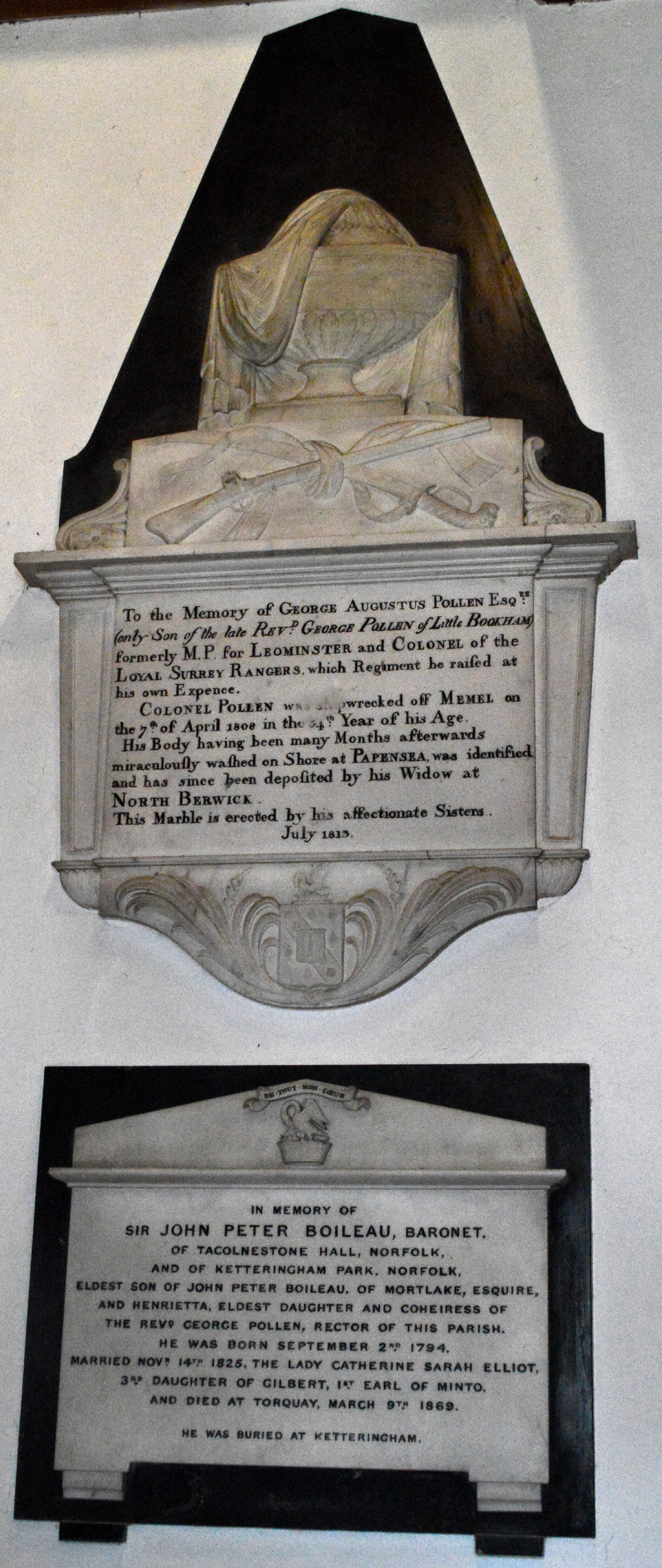
Memorial, All Saints, Little Bookham

In 1825, he married Lady Catherine Sarah Elliot-Murray-Kynynmound, the third daughter of Gilbert Elliot-Murray-Kynynmound, 1st Earl of Minto and Anna Maria Amyand (a daughter of Sir George Amyand, 1st Baronet). They had four sons and five daughters. Their children were:

- Anna Maria Boileau (1826–1897), who married Rev. William Gurney, son of Daniel Gurney and Lady Harriett Hary (daughter of William Hay, 17th Earl of Erroll). They had issue.
- John Elliot Boileau (1827–1861), who died unmarried.
- Caroline Mary Boileau (c. 1829–1877), who died unmarried.
- Sir Francis George Boileau, 2nd Baronet
- Edmund William Pollen Boileau (1831–1883), who married Bridget Walsh and had issue.
- Agnes Lucy Boileau (c. 1833–1881), who married Hon. William John Borlase Warren Venables-Vernon, son of George Venables-Vernon, 5th Baron Vernon.
- Lt. Charles Augustus Penrhyn Boileau (1835–1855)
- Mary Georgina Boileau (1836–1910), who died unmarried.
- Theressa Anna Catherine Boileau (c. 1840–1872), who died unmarried.

His wife died in 1862 and Boileau survived her until 1869, having suffered from chronic bronchitis in his last years. Sir John died on 9 March 1869 at Torquay and was buried in the family's vault in Ketteringham. His oldest son John having predeceased him in 1861, he was succeeded in the baronetcy by his second son Francis.

=== Descendants ===
Through his daughter Agnes, he was a grandfather of Reginald Venables-Vernon.

Baronetage of the United Kingdom
New creation	Baronet (of Tacolnestone Hall); 1838 – 1869	Succeeded by Francis Boileau
