= Jean Colombe =

French painter and illuminator (c. 1430 – c. 1493)

- Born: c. 1430; Bourges, Kingdom of France
- Died: c. 1493 (aged 62–63); Bourges, Kingdom of France
- Notable work: Les Très Riches Heures du duc de Berry
- Patrons: Louis de Laval, Charles I, Duke of Savoy, Charlotte of Savoy

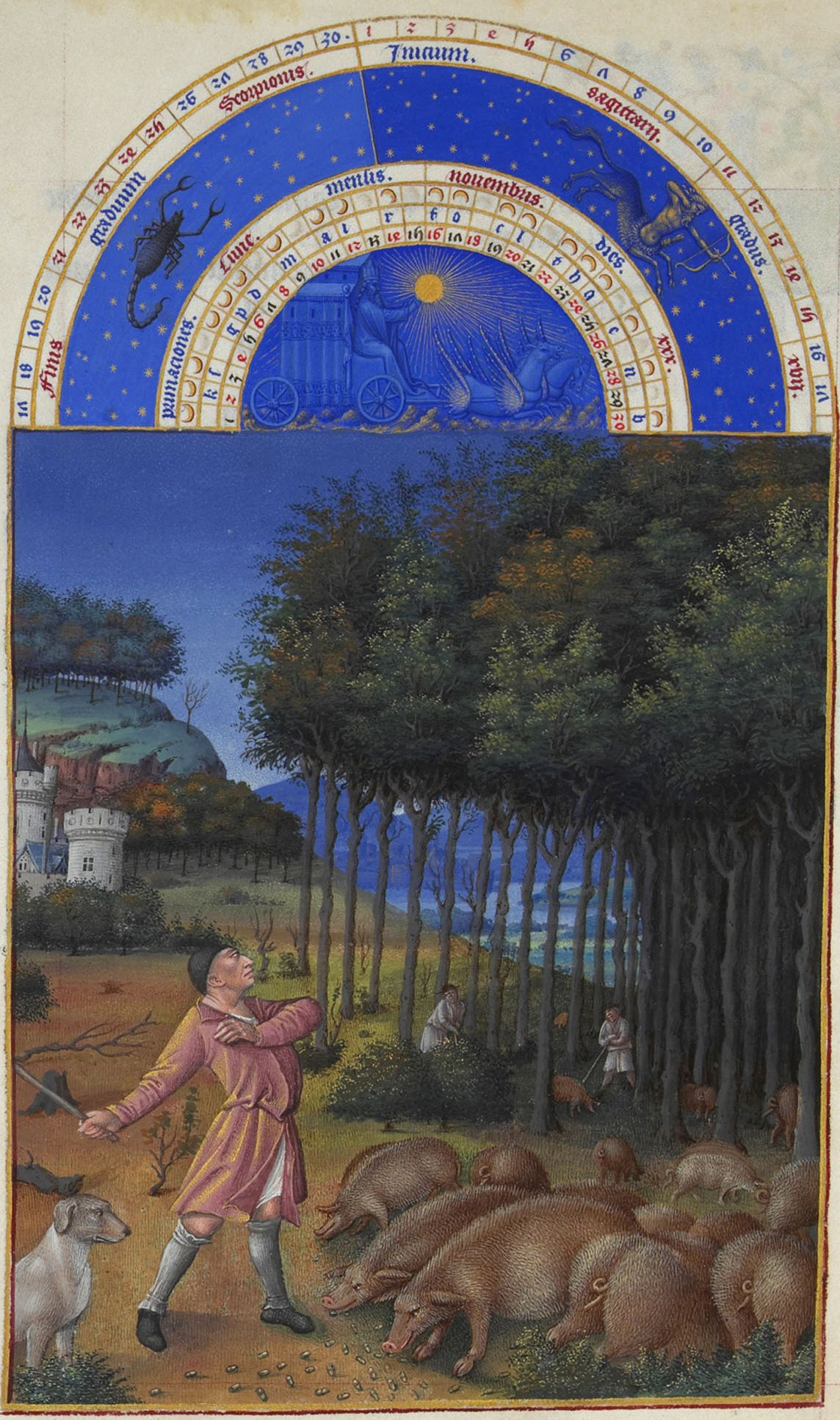
Les Très Riches Heures du duc de Berry, November

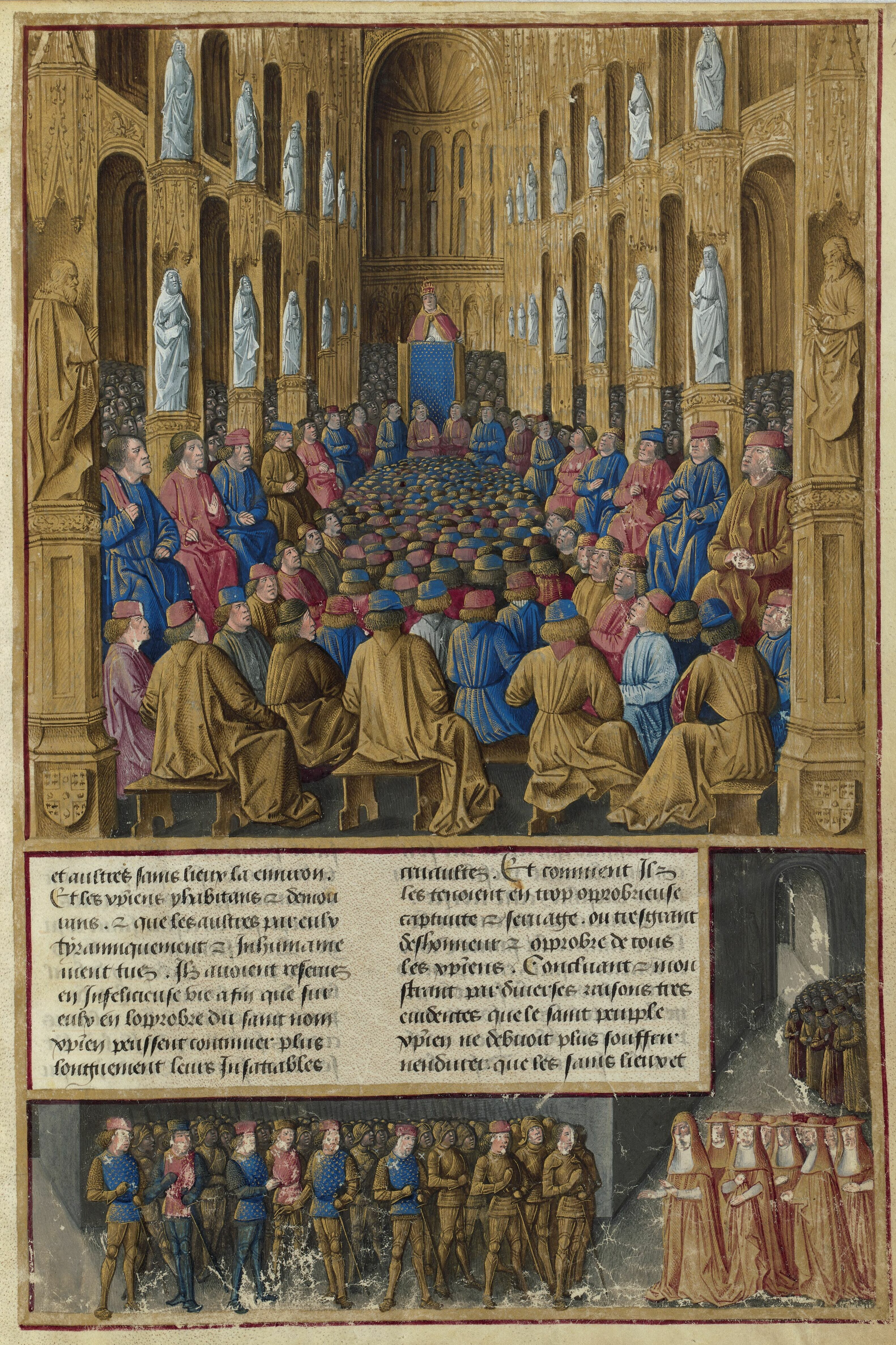
The Council of Clermont from the Passages d'outremer

Jean Colombe (Latin: Ioannes Colombus; c. 1430 – c. 1493) was a French miniature painter and illuminator of manuscripts. He is best known for his work in Très Riches Heures du Duc de Berry. He was a son of Philippe Colombe and his wife Guillemette and thus the brother of the sculptor Michel Colombe.

== Work ==
In 1470–1472, Colombe created the miniatures of the Heures de Louis de Laval; around 1475, he illuminated the crusader chronicles, Les Passages d'oultre mer du noble Godefroy de Bouillon, du bon roy Saint Loys et de plusieurs vertueux princes, by Sébastien Mamerot. Both works had been commissioned by Louis de Laval. Between 1485 and 1490, Jean Colombe completed the decoration of the Très Riches Heures which had been left unfinished in 1416. He executed the image for the month of November (below the zodiac arch), completed the Limbourg brothers’ design for September, and retouched other images.
