= William Warren Vernon =

British noble and Dante scholar (1834–1919)

The Honourable William Warren Vernon
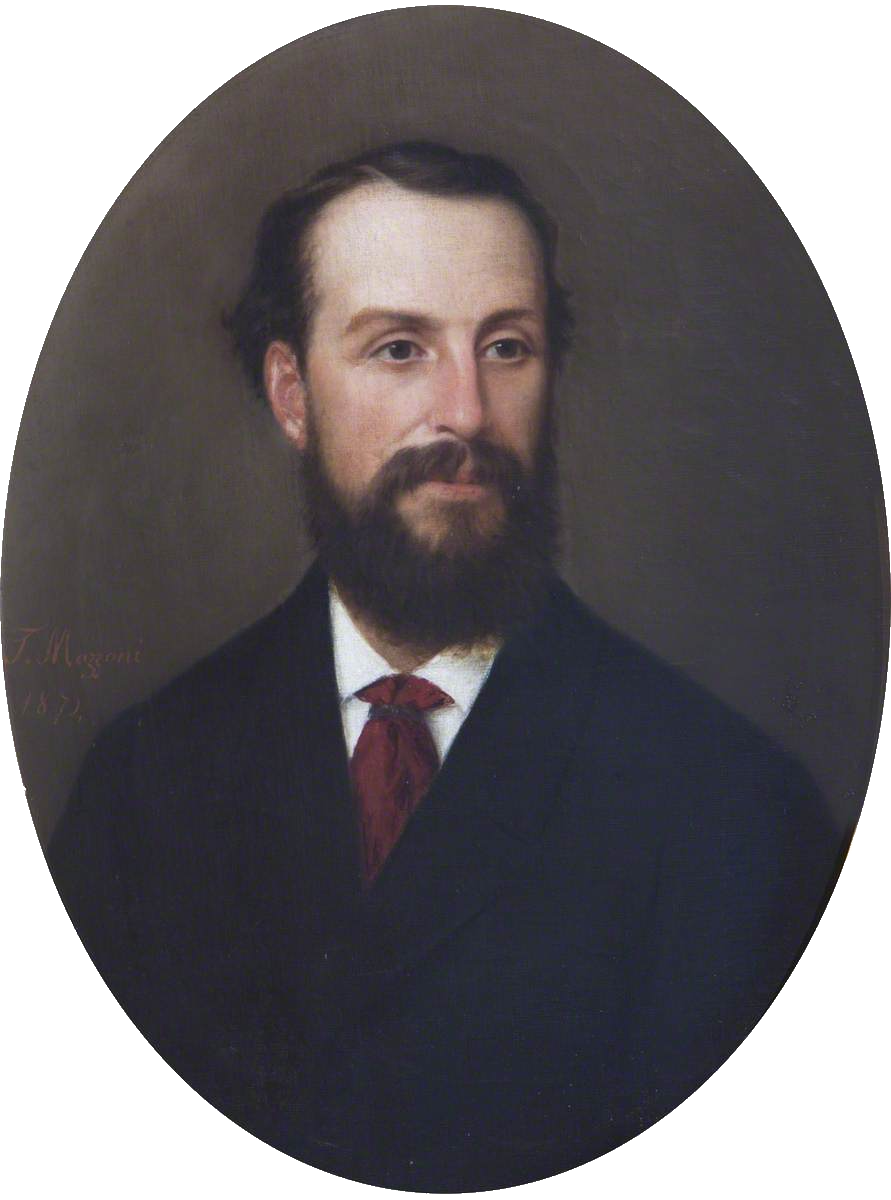

Personal details
- Born: William John Borlase-Warren-Venables-Vernon; 1834
- Died: 12 November 1919 (aged 84–85) London, United Kingdom
- Spouses: Agnes Lucy Boileau (m. 1855; died 1881); Annie Georgiana Eyre (m. 1884)
- Parent: George Venables-Vernon, 5th Baron Vernon (father)
- Education: Eton College; Christ Church, Oxford
- Awards: Knight of the Order of St. Olav

William John Borlase-Warren-Venables-Vernon (1834 – 12 November 1919) was a British Dante scholar. He was mostly known for publishing previously unpublished works, being the first to publish Benvenuto Rambaldi da Imola's commentary on Dante's Divine Comedy.

== Early life and education ==
Vernon was born in 1834. He spent some time in Italy with his father, George Venables-Vernon, before moving back to England to attend Eton College. He then attended Christ Church, Oxford as a commoner, but left in 1855 to get married before he could finish his degree. He returned to finish it twenty years later.

== Works ==
In 1887, Vernon published Rambaldi da Imola's Latin commentary on Dante's Divine Comedy. The commentary was originally written around 1390, and had previously remained unpublished.

In 1917, Vernon published an autobiography titled Recollections of Seventy-Two Years.

== Personal life ==
Vernon was a Freemason who married Agnes Lucy Boileau, daughter of John Boileau, 1st Baronet.

== Awards and honours ==
- Member of the Accademia della Crusca
- Gold medal from Queen Margherita
- Junior Grand Warden of England
