= Dolo, Côtes-d'Armor =

Dolo Doloù
- Part of Jugon-les-Lacs
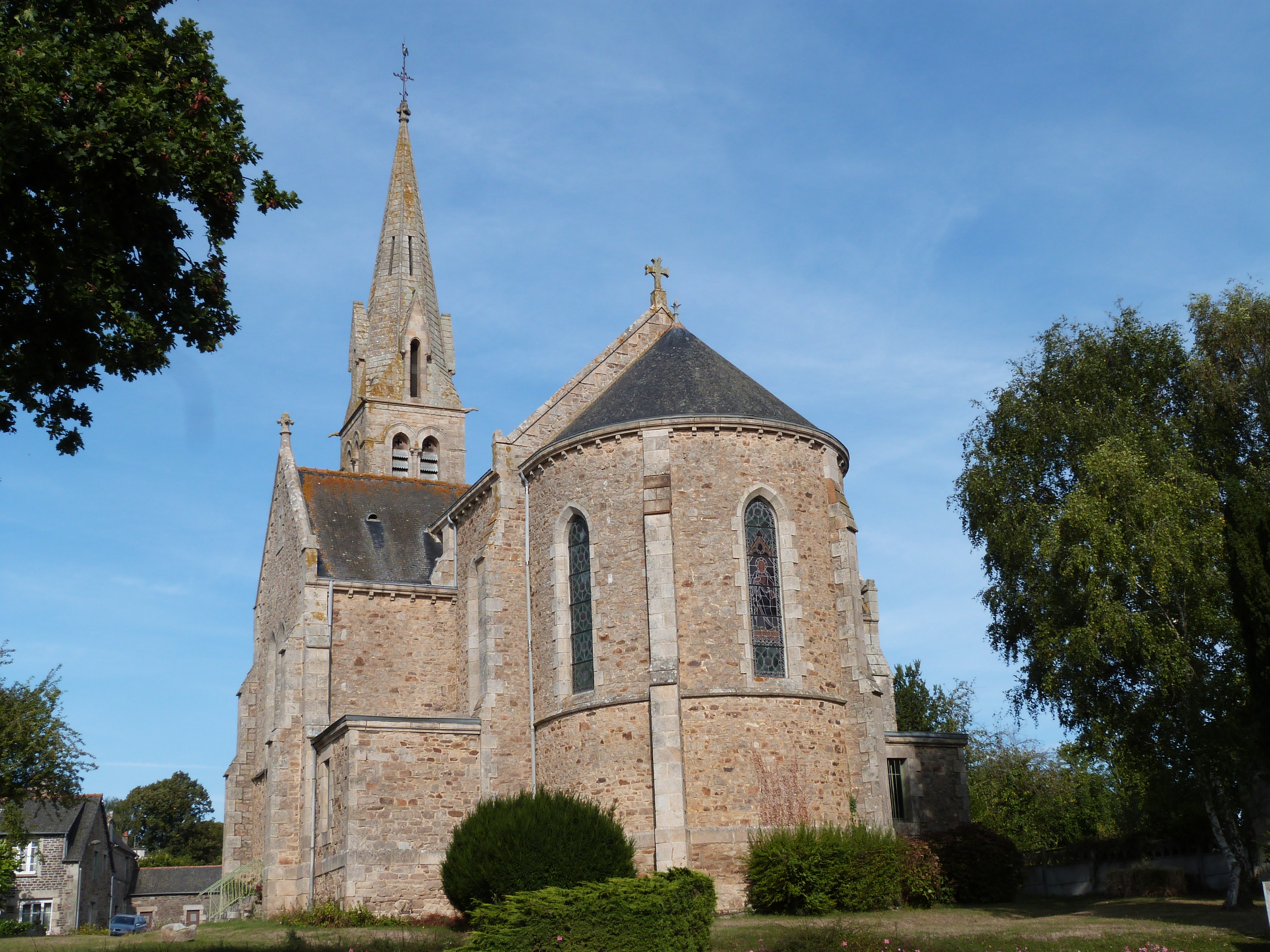

- Coat of arms
- Location of Dolo
- Location within France Location within Brittany
- Coordinates: 48°23′05″N 2°19′42″W
- Country: France
- Region: Brittany
- Department: Côtes-d'Armor
- Arrondissement: Dinan
- Canton: Plénée-Jugon
- Commune: Jugon-les-Lacs
- Area^{1}: 11.88 km^{2} (4.59 sq mi)
- Highest elevation: 94 m (308 ft)
- Lowest elevation: 27 m (89 ft)
- Population (2022): 706
  - Density: 59.4/km^{2} (154/sq mi)
- Time zone: UTC+01:00 (CET)
  - Summer (DST): UTC+02:00 (CEST)
- Postal code: 22270
- ^{1} French Land Register data, which excludes lakes, ponds, glaciers > 1 km^{2} (0.386 sq mi or 247 acres) and river estuaries.

Dolo (French pronunciation: [dɔlo]; Breton: Doloù; Gallo: Doloe) is a former commune in the Côtes-d'Armor department of Brittany in northwestern France. On 1 January 2016, it was merged into the new commune Jugon-les-Lacs - Commune nouvelle, which was renamed Jugon-les-Lacs effective 2024.

The Arguenon river flows through the commune.

== Population ==
Inhabitants of Dolo are called dulcinéens in French.

Historical population
Year	Pop.	±% p.a.
1962	431	—
1968	513	+2.95%
1975	518	+0.14%
1982	480	−1.08%
1990	467	−0.34%
1999	426	−1.02%
2006	513	+2.69%
2022	706	+2.02%
Source: EHESS and INSEE

== See also ==
- Communes of the Côtes-d'Armor department
