= Sébastien Mamerot =

French clergyman

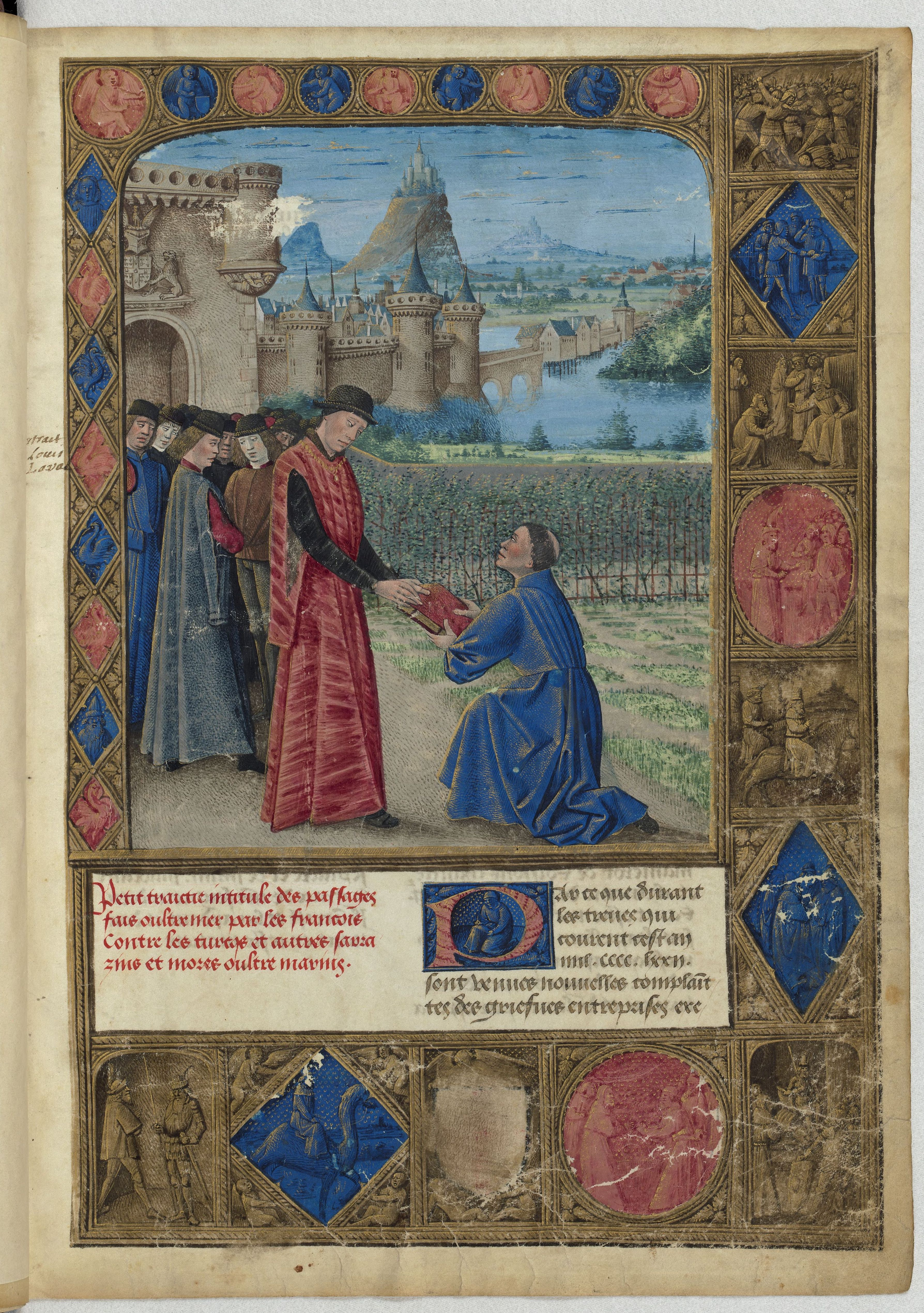
Sébastien Mamerot presenting Passages d'outremer to Louis de Laval

Sébastien Mamerot (between c. 1418 and 1440 – 1490) was a French clergyman, scholar, novelist, and translator.

== Biography ==
Originally from Soissons, Mamerot served as clergyman and secretary to Louis de Laval, governor of Dauphiné (1448–1458), Champagne (1465–1472) and Touraine (1483–1484), protégé and adviser to King Louis XI.

In 1460, he became chaplain. From July 1472 to August 1478, he was a canon and cantor at the Collegiate Church of Saint-Étienne in Troyes.

In 1466, he wrote Romuléon, based on translating the original Romuleon, a work commissioned by Louis de Laval.

In 1472, Louis de Laval asked his clergyman and secretary, Mamerot, to write a chronicle of the Crusades. That work, entitled Passages d'outremer, was a collection of various stories, from the legendary conquest of Jerusalem by Charlemagne to the Battle of Nicopolis in 1396 and Siege of Constantinople (1394–1402). Later on, another text was added to the beginning of the manuscript, a French translation of a letter written by Sultan Bayezid II to King Charles VIII, which was sent from Constantinople on July 4, 1488.

In 1488, based on his own impressions of a trip to the Levant, he compiled the Compendieuse Description de la Terre de Promision.

== Works ==
- Cronicques martiniennes (Martinian Chronicles) (1458), translation and extension of Martin of Opava's universal chronicle written in 1277, which presents the history of popes and emperors.
- Histoire des neuf preus et des neuf preues (1460), a continuation of the Nine Worthies.
- Romuléon (1466), translation into French of the Latin Romuleon by Benvenuto Rambaldi da Imola, a collection of stories about the history of Rome.
- Les trois grands (before 1472), a humanist tract comparing the three "greats", Alexander, Pompey and Charlemagne.
- L'ordre des règnes et régnons de France (19 April 1474), a list of French kings and queens.
- Passages faiz oultre mer par les François contre les Turcqs et autres Sarrazins et Mores oultre marins (Overseas campaigns of the French against the Turks, Saracens and Moors), usually known simply as the Passages d'outremer (circa 1474–1475), illustrated manuscript, which contains 66 miniatures, made by Jean Colombe.
- Compendieuse description de la terre de promision (A Brief Description of the Promised Land) (1488), written following the results of the author's pilgrimage to the Holy Land.

== Bibliography ==
- Delcourt, Thierry; Quéruel, Danielle; Masanès, Fabrice, eds. (2009). Sébastien Mamerot, Les passages d'outremer: A Chronicle of the Crusades. Taschen.
- Duval, Frédéric (1998). "Sébastien Mamerot". Romania. 116 (463–464): 461–491.
- Duval, Frédéric (2001). Le "Romuleon" en françois: Traduction de Sébastien Mamerot (in French). Librairie Droz. ISBN 2600004807.
- Kia-Choon, Kevin Teo (2010). "Mamerot, Sébastien". In Graeme Dunphy (ed.). Encyclopedia of the Medieval Chronicle. Vol. 2: J–Z. Brill. p. 1064.
- Ross, D. J. A. (1986). "Les Trois Grands: A New MS and the Identity of the Author". Medium Aevum. 55: 261–266.
