= Jugon-les-Lacs =

- Commune
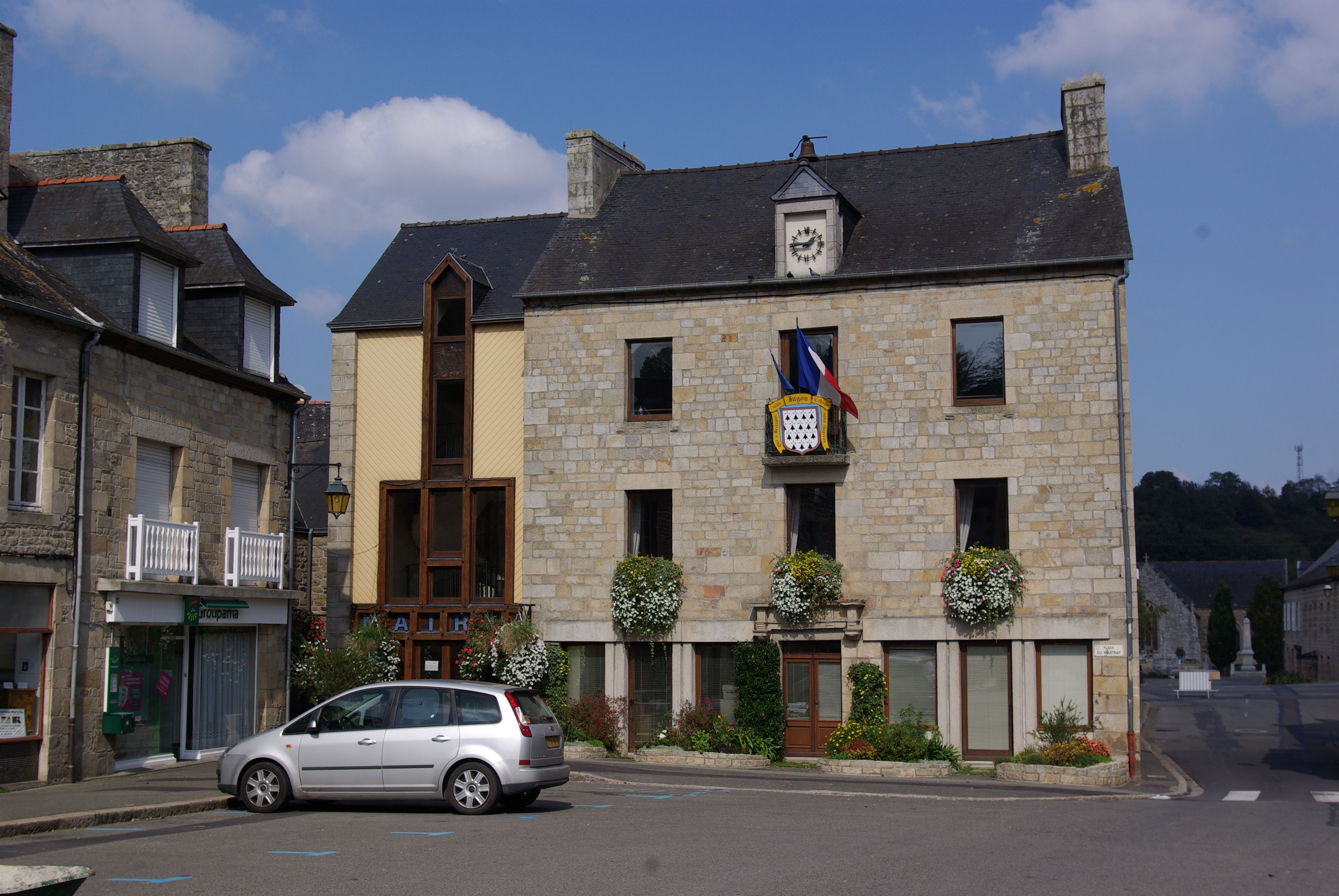
- The town hall in Jugon-les-Lacs

- Coat of arms
- Location of Jugon-les-Lacs
- Location within France Location within Brittany
- Coordinates: 48°24′32″N 2°19′19″W
- Country: France
- Region: Brittany
- Department: Côtes-d'Armor
- Arrondissement: Saint-Brieuc
- Canton: Plénée-Jugon
- Intercommunality: CA Lamballe Terre et Mer

Government
  - Mayor (2020–2026): Eric Moisan
- Area^{1}: 38.03 km^{2} (14.68 sq mi)
- Population (2023): 2,541
  - Density: 66.82/km^{2} (173.1/sq mi)
- Time zone: UTC+01:00 (CET)
  - Summer (DST): UTC+02:00 (CEST)
- INSEE/Postal code: 22084 /22270
- ^{1} French Land Register data, which excludes lakes, ponds, glaciers > 1 km^{2} (0.386 sq mi or 247 acres) and river estuaries.

Jugon-les-Lacs (French pronunciation: [ʒyɡɔ̃ le lak]; before 2024: Jugon-les-Lacs - Commune nouvelle, literally Jugon-les-Lacs New Commune; Breton: Lanyugon-Kumun-Nevez) is a commune in the Côtes-d'Armor department of western France. The municipality was established on 1 January 2016 and consists of the former communes of Jugon-les-Lacs and Dolo.

The commune is listed as a Village étape.

== Population ==
Population data refer to the commune in its geography as of January 2025.

Historical population
Year	Pop.	±% p.a.
1968	1,930	—
1975	1,810	−0.91%
1982	1,831	+0.16%
1990	1,750	−0.56%
1999	1,774	+0.15%
2007	2,129	+2.31%
2012	2,470	+3.02%
2017	2,493	+0.19%
2023	2,541	+0.32%
Source: INSEE

== See also ==
- Communes of the Côtes-d'Armor department
