= Benvenuto Rambaldi da Imola =

Italian scholar and historian (1330–1388)

Benvenuto Rambaldi da Imola, or simply and perhaps more accurately Benvenuto da Imola (Latin: Benevenutus Imolensis; 1330 – 1388), was an Italian scholar and historian, a lecturer at Bologna. He is now best known for his commentary on Dante's Divine Comedy.

== Life ==
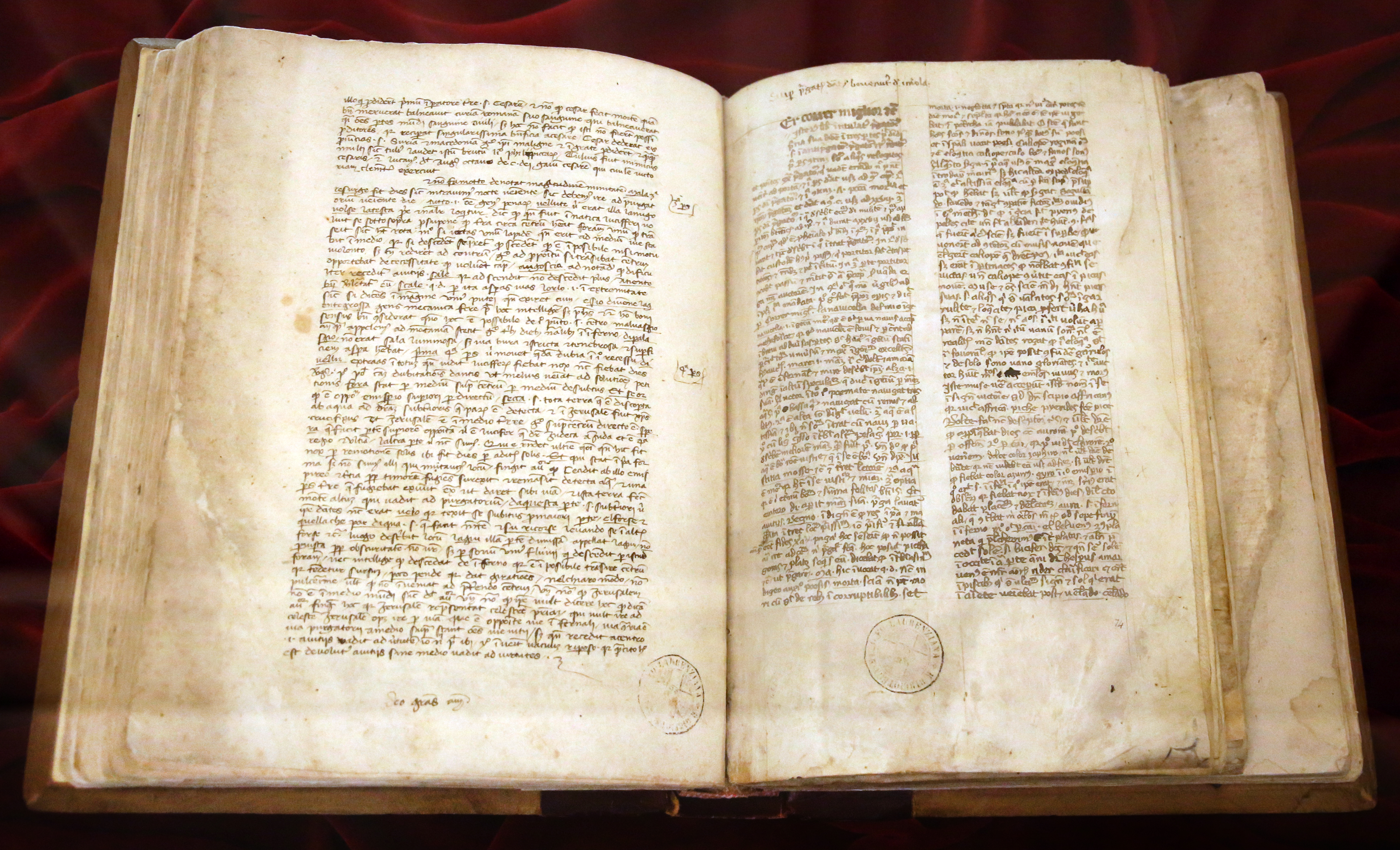
Comentum super Dantis Aldigherii Comoediam, 1381 (BML, Ashburnham 839)

He was born in Imola, into a family of legal officers. In 1361–2 he was working for Gómez Albornoz, governor of Bologna and nephew of Cardinal Egidio Albornoz.

In 1365 he went on a diplomatic mission on behalf of the city, to Avignon and Pope Urban V. At the time members of the Alidosi family dominated Imola, and other citizens looked to the papacy for a change. The petition brought by Benvenuto and others failed; the local political situation at home caused him to move on without returning, going to Bologna, where he made a living as a teacher. He was made the subject of accusations of indecency there, which may have been connected to lectures on the Inferno; on the other hand, Benvenuto himself had made accusations to the papal legate in Bologna of improper teacher-student relationships of others. While previously in Bologna he may have lectured officially, and did teach some classical authors, his later lectures were in a private house, that of the grammarian Giovanni de Soncino.

In 1373 he visited Florence and there heard Boccaccio lecture on Dante. From 1375 he was based in Ferrara. There he had the protection of Niccolò II d'Este, Marquis of Ferrara, whom he had met in Avignon.

== Works ==
An early humanist, he still wrote in medieval Latin. His commentary on Dante was known as the Comentum super Dantis Aligherii comoediam. Charles Eliot Norton considered that Benvenuto's commentary on Dante had "a value beyond that of any of the other fourteenth-century commentators". Modern scholars highly regard Benvenuto's glosses for providing precise contemporary context on the regional nobility of Romagna and the Bolognese countryside mentioned by Dante, including the Malatesta of Rimini, the local Alidosi faction, and the Biancuzzi family of Pier da Medicina. It exists in three versions: one published in 1875, one from his time in Ferrara, and a third published in 1887 by William Warren Vernon (edited by James Philip Lacaita). The second (Ferrara) version is a source for his theory that the Divine Comedy combines the three genres of comedy, tragedy and satire. It influenced Juan de Mena, in particular, via Giovanni da Serravalle who had heard Benvenuto teach. Benvenuto acknowledged influence himself from the tradition of Averroes and Hermannus Alemannus, as well as Boccaccio.

Other works were:

- Romuleon, a Latin compendium of Roman history. It was an extensive compilation in ten books, made in the period 1361–4 for Gómez Albornoz. At the end of the 15th century it was rewritten by Adamo Montaldo. It covered the history from the foundation of Rome to Constantine the Great.

This work is not connected to the Gesta Romanorum, but sometimes went under the title De Gestis Romanorum, or in its French version Des fai(t)s des Romains. It circulated in a small number of manuscripts of high quality; the first French translation (1460) was by Jean Miélot, for Philip the Good and it was transcribed by David Aubert. Another followed in 1466 by Sébastien Mamerot, for Louis de Laval, seigneur de Châtillon. Six manuscripts of Miélot's Romuléon are known.

- A commentary on Virgil's Eclogues (Bucolics) and Georgics. Benvenuto was critical of the Aeneid commentary of Ciones de Magnali (known as Zono). He also disapproved of the classical commentary of Servius.
- Commentaries on Lucan, Valerius Maximus, and the tragedies of Seneca the Younger;
- Augustalis libellus, a work on Roman emperors, with scope from Julius Caesar to the Holy Roman Emperor Wenceslas.

He also wrote on Petrarch's Carmen Bucolicum.
