= Louis de Laval =

French nobleman

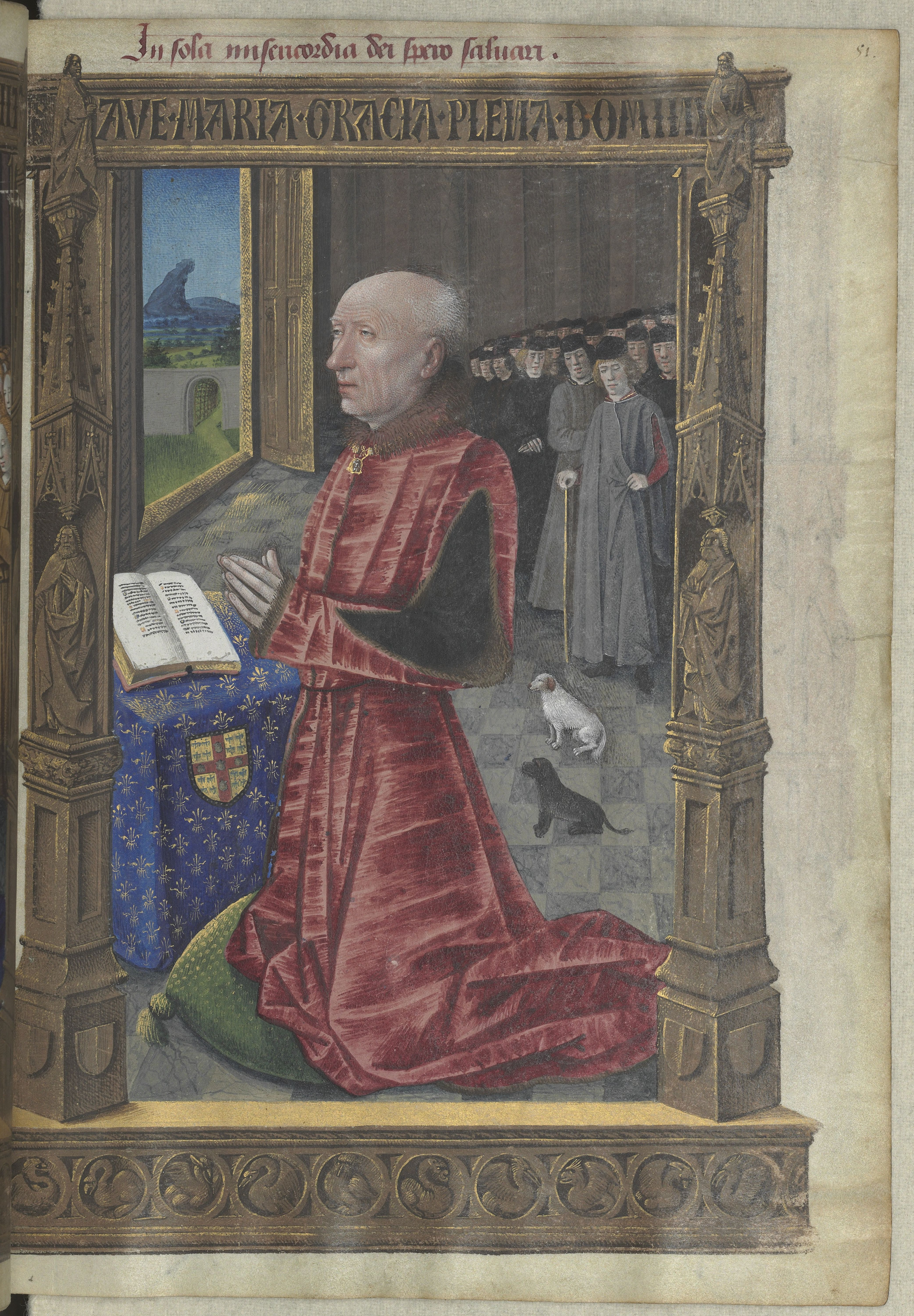
Louis praying, from the Heures de Louis de Laval

Louis de Laval (1411 – 21 August 1489) was a French nobleman, soldier, politician and bibliophile.

== Life ==
A member of the House of Laval, Louis was born in 1411. He was the third son of the Baroness Anne de Laval and Baron Guy XIII. He inherited the lordship of Châtillon-en-Vendelais in the barony of Vitré. He also acquired the castle of Comper and the lordship of Frinandour.

When his elder brothers, Count Guy XIV de Laval and André de Lohéac, joined Joan of Arc's campaign in 1429, Louis stayed home with their mother. In 1431, he was made captain of Jugon by Duke John V of Brittany. He later served Duke Peter II and the Constable Arthur de Richemont. According to Guillaume Gruel, he was one of Richemont's squires at his second wedding to Jeanne II d'Albret in 1442. He was a permanent member of Richemont's company between 1443 and 1445.

Afterwards, Louis sought advancement at the royal court. King Charles VII appointed him governor of the Dauphiné in 1448 and of French-occupied Genoa in 1461. He was in Genoa when Louis XI succeeded Charles on the throne. When the War of the Public Weal broke out in 1465, he remained loyal to the crown. On 4 August 1465, he was named governor of Champagne. In a letter to the city of Reims, the king praised Louis as "a man of great conduct, wise and expert in warfare and other things."

On 18 May 1466, Louis XI appointed Louis Grand Maître des Eaux et Forêts du Roi, with the power to appoint and dismiss all officials under him. On 21 May 1483, however, the king limited his powers. Although he spent his career in royal service in various parts of France, Louis still frequently joined his elder brother for hunts on his Breton estates. Thomas Basin relates a story of how Louis attempted to put him in his debt by intervening on Thomas's behalf without being asked. Thomas calls him a "generous and powerful lord".

Louis and his brother André were among the original twelve knights of the Order of Saint Michael, created by Louis XI on 1 August 1469. In 1483, Louis was appointed governor of Touraine. He maintained a pro-French attitude throughout the Mad War of 1485–1488 and, in one of his final letters, dated 16 October 1488, urged Charles VIII to marry the Breton heiress, Anne of Brittany, thereby uniting the duchy with the crown.

Louis died at Laval on 21 August 1489 and was buried there in the church of Saint-Tugdual.

== Bibliophily ==
Louis's coat of arms, from his book of hours

Nine manuscripts from Louis's library are now in the Bibliothèque nationale de France. Six of these he acquired and three he had commissioned. The six are:

- MS fr. 316, a copy from c. 1373 of Le Miroir historial, Jean de Vignay's French translation of Vincent of Beauvais's Speculum historiale
- MS fr. 409, a 14th-century French religious miscellany, including homilies on the Nativity and the conversion of Paul; Le mariage de Nostre-Dame; La passion de Nostre Seigneur Jhesu Crist; La vie de Magdaleine; Lamentation Notre Dame; and Laurent d'Orléans's La somme le roi
- MS fr. 2651, a historical collection from 1442 containing the first book of Jean Froissart's Chronicles, the Grande Chronique de Normandie and the treaty of Guérande (1380)
- MS fr. 2652, a copy of the second book of Froissart's Chronicles
- MS fr. 2653, a copy of the third book of Froissart's Chronicles
- MS fr. 2654, a copy of the fourth book of Froissart's Chronicles

Louis's chaplain Sébastien Mamerot translated many texts from Latin into French for his patron. Louis commissioned from him a translation and continuation of the universal history of Martin of Opava. The resulting Cronicques martiniennes, now MS fr. 9684, was presented in 1458. Louis also commissioned him to write a history of the Crusades, which became the Passages d'outremer. The presentation copy from 1474 or 1475, now MS fr. 5594, was illustrated by Jean Colombe and possibly Jean de Montluçon. Around 1480, Colombe illustrated a book of hours for Louis, now known as the Heures de Louis de Laval (MS lat. 920). It follows the use of Rome and contains three illustrations of Louis's coat of arms and three portraits. In his will, Louis left his book of hours to Anne of France, duchess of Bourbon.

== Bibliography ==
- Booton, Diane E. (2010). Manuscripts, Market and the Transition to Print in Late Medieval Brittany. Ashgate.
- Couffon, René (1967). "Le cénotaphe du connétable de Clisson à Josselin". Bulletin Monumental. 125 (2): 167–175.
- Duval, Frédéric (2001). La traduction du "Romuleon" par Sébastien Mamerot: étude sur la diffusion de l'histoire romaine en langue vernaculaire à la fin du Moyen Âge. Librairie Droz.
- Lapina, Elizabeth (2019). "Crusader Chronicles". In Anthony Bale (ed.). The Cambridge Companion to the Literature of the Crusades. Cambridge University Press. pp. 11–24.
- Lewis, P. S. (2002). "Note on the Fifteenth-Century Grande Chronique de Normandie". Nottingham Medieval Studies. 46: 185–198. doi:10.1484/j.nms.3.341.
- Walsby, Malcolm (2007). The Counts of Laval: Culture, Patronage and Religion in Fifteenth- and Sixteenth-Century France. Ashgate.
- Trévédy, Julien (1909). Les Bretons compagnons du connétable de Richemont. Lafolye Frères.
