= Jugon-les-Lacs (delegated commune) =

Jugon-les-Lacs Lanyugon
- Part of Jugon-les-Lacs
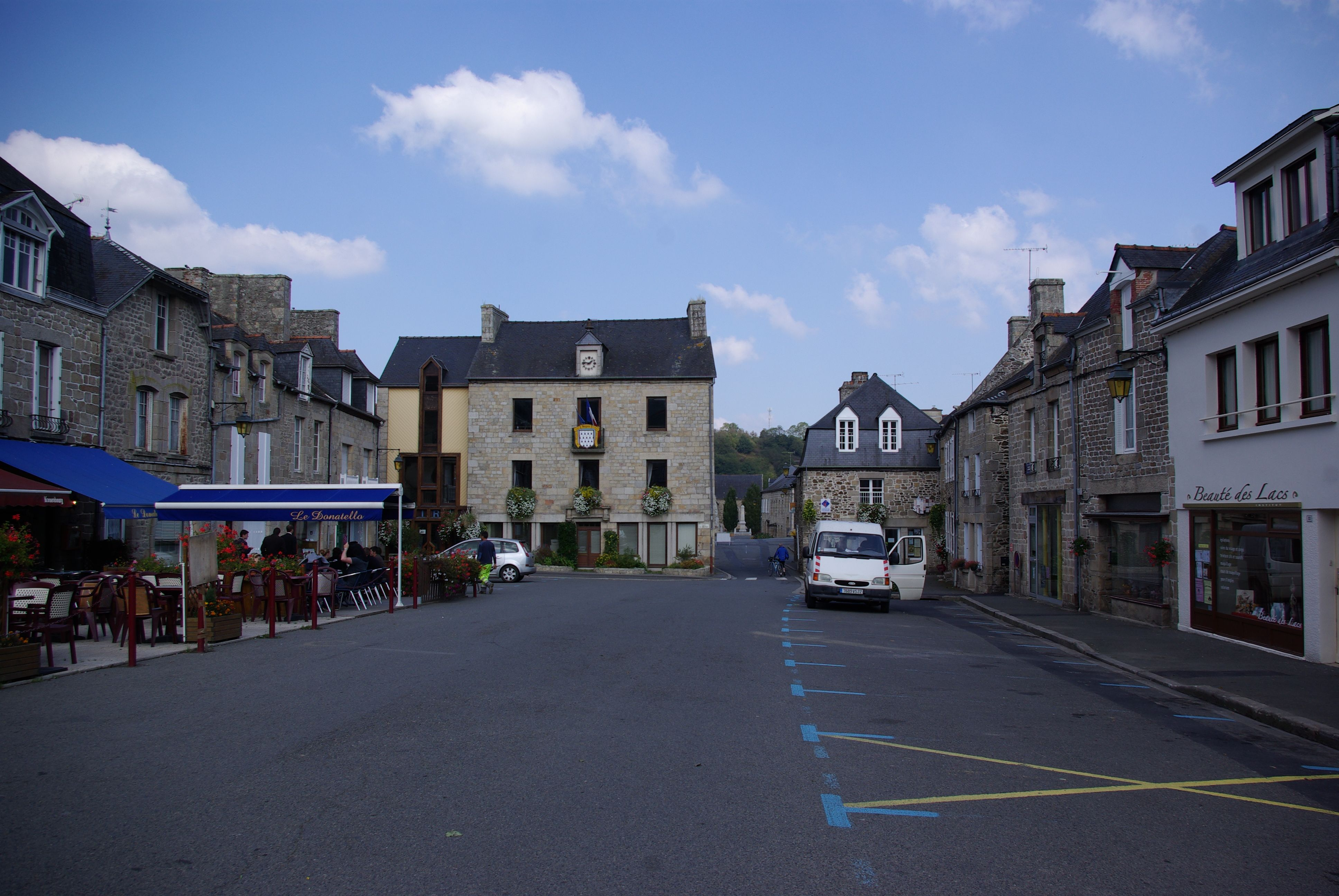

- Coat of arms
- Location of Jugon-les-Lacs
- Location within France Location within Brittany
- Coordinates: 48°24′36″N 2°19′15″W
- Country: France
- Region: Brittany
- Department: Côtes-d'Armor
- Arrondissement: Dinan
- Canton: Plénée-Jugon
- Commune: Jugon-les-Lacs
- Area^{1}: 26.15 km^{2} (10.10 sq mi)
- Highest elevation: 116 m (381 ft)
- Lowest elevation: 17 m (56 ft)
- Population (2022): 1,822
  - Density: 69.67/km^{2} (180.5/sq mi)
- Time zone: UTC+01:00 (CET)
  - Summer (DST): UTC+02:00 (CEST)
- Postal code: 22270
- ^{1} French Land Register data, which excludes lakes, ponds, glaciers > 1 km^{2} (0.386 sq mi or 247 acres) and river estuaries.

Jugon-les-Lacs (French pronunciation: [ʒyɡɔ̃ le lak]; Breton: Lanyugon; Gallo: Jugon) is a former commune in the Côtes-d'Armor department of Brittany in northwestern France. It was created in 1973 by the merger of the former communes Jugon, Lescouët-Jugon and Saint-Igneuc. On 1 January 2016, it was merged into the new commune Jugon-les-Lacs - Commune nouvelle, which was renamed Jugon-les-Lacs effective 2024.

The Arguenon river flows through the commune. The Arguenon's flow has been measured in Jugon-les-Lacs since 1972 at station J1103010 L'Arguenon, at an altitude of 31 metres (102 ft) with a catchment area of 104 kilometres (64.62 mi).

== Population ==
People from Jugon-les-Lacs are known in French as jugonnais.

Historical population
Year	Pop.	±% p.a.
1975	1,292	—
1982	1,351	+0.64%
1990	1,283	−0.64%
1999	1,348	+0.55%
2006	1,504	+1.58%
2022	1,822	+1.21%
Source: EHESS and INSEE

== See also ==
- Communes of the Côtes-d'Armor department
